= List of New Zealand by-elections =

By-elections in New Zealand

By-elections in New Zealand occur to fill vacant seats in the House of Representatives. The death, resignation, or expulsion of a sitting electorate MP can cause a by-election. (Note that list MPs do not have geographic districts for the purpose of provoking by-elections – if a list MP's seat becomes vacant, the next person on his or her party's list fills the position.) Historically, by-elections were often caused by general elections being declared void.

== Background ==
Under the Electoral Act 1993, a by-election need not take place if a general election will occur within six months of an electorate seat becoming vacant, although confirmation by a resolution supported by at least 75% of MPs is required. In 1996 the general election date was brought forward slightly, to 12 October, to avoid a by-election after the resignation of Michael Laws. Twice, in 1943 and 1969, by-elections were avoided after the deaths in election years of Paraire Karaka Paikea and Ralph Hanan by passing special acts, the By-election Postponement Act 1943 and the By-election Postponement Act 1969.

In recent years by-elections have not occurred particularly frequently – only one in the 2002–2005 parliamentary term, and none in the 1999–2002 or 2005–2008 terms. This is because most MPs who retire mid-term (e.g. Labour MPs Jim Sutton and Michael Cullen) were List MPs, so are simply replaced by the next member below them on their party list (unless that person is already an electorate MP, or does not agree). Some MPs have entered Parliament when two or more people above them on the list have declined, sometimes after pressure from their party: in 2008 Dail Jones (New Zealand First) and Russel Norman (Green); and in 2011 Louisa Wall (Labour) after five above her on the list declined.

Historically, however, they have taken place considerably more frequently – the 2nd Parliament of 1856–1860, for example, saw 33 by-elections and four supplementary elections, despite the House of Representatives originally having just 37 seats (increasing to 41 seats during the parliamentary term).

In the past it was not uncommon for an MP who died in office to be replaced with an immediate family member such as a brother, wife (see widow's succession), or son. This resulted in the election of the first woman MP Elizabeth McCombs (who was in turn succeeded by her son Terry McCombs), the first woman National MP Mary Grigg, and the first woman Māori MP Iriaka Rātana; all of whom took over their husband's seat. This practice has however fallen out of favour since the mid-seventies with the election of John Kirk to his late father's seat being the last occasion this happened at a by-election.

Mary Grigg was elected unopposed, and Wood notes that the 1942 Mid-Canterbury by-election is an extreme case where the election was gazetted without date of election, and four different dates are available from reputable sources: Official Year-book, Parliamentary Record, Journals of the House and J Boston.

Twelve Prime Ministers first came to parliament via by-elections: Julius Vogel, Harry Atkinson, Robert Stout, John Ballance, William Hall-Jones, William Massey, Peter Fraser, Keith Holyoake, Walter Nash, Bill Rowling, David Lange and Geoffrey Palmer. Six Prime Ministers (William Fox, Henry Sewell, Edward Stafford, George Grey, Joseph Ward and Jacinda Ardern) have won by-elections later in their parliamentary careers, while Labour leaders Harry Holland and David Shearer were also first elected via a by-election.

Some minor party founders have also launched their parties by resigning from a major party and their seat, then contesting it for their new party. Party founders who have done this include Matiu Rata and Tariana Turia. Both resigned from Labour to form Māori parties. In 1980 Rata was unsuccessful in retaking his Northern Maori electorate for his newly formed Mana Motuhake party, but in 2004 Turia successfully reclaimed Te Tai Hauauru for the Māori Party. In addition, Winston Peters resigned from National and his parliamentary seat in 1993, retaking the seat as an independent and going on to form the New Zealand First party. In these circumstances, by-elections are seen as a legitimisation of the MP's rejection of his or her old party. In addition, they provide vital publicity and something of a mandate for the new party.

By-elections for the party in government in the two-party era due to a resignation were sometimes an opportunity for party supporters to abstain or to vote against the government if they disapprove of their party's policies, without endangering the government. Bruce Beetham entered parliament for Social Credit at the 1978 Rangitikei by-election, as did Gary Knapp in the 1980 East Coast Bays by-election. In the 1994 Selwyn by-election National retained the seat, but the Alliance candidate came second, perhaps held by votes from disaffected Labour voters for the Alliance candidate. The 1926 Eden by-election was won by Labour who became the official opposition, helped by a split over the Reform candidate selection.

== Pre-party era ==
By-election and electorate		Date	Incumbent	Reason	Winner
=== 1st Parliament (1853–1855) ===
1854	Town of Nelson	19 June	William Travers	Resignation	Samuel Stephens
1854	Waimea	21 June	William Cautley	Resignation	William Travers
1854	City of Auckland	4 August	Thomas Bartley	Resignation	William Brown
=== 2nd Parliament (1855–1860) ===
1856	Motueka and Massacre Bay	17 May	Charles Parker	Resignation	Herbert Curtis
1856	Christchurch Country	14 October	Dingley Brittin	Resignation	John Ollivier
1856	Grey and Bell	14 October	Charles Brown	Resignation	John Lewthwaite
1856	Town of Christchurch	18 November	Henry Sewell	Resignation	Richard Packer
1856	Hutt	27 November	Alfred Ludlam	Resignation	Samuel Revans
1858	City of Auckland	27 April	John Logan Campbell	Resignation	Thomas Forsaith
1858	Pensioner Settlements	29 April	Joseph Greenwood	Resignation	Jermyn Symonds
1858	Southern Division	8 May	Charles Taylor	Resignation	Theodore Haultain
1858	Grey and Bell	17 May	John Lewthwaite	Resignation	Charles Brown
1858	Waimea	21 May	Charles Elliott	Resignation	David Monro
1858	Wairau	21 May	William Wells	Resignation	Frederick Weld
1858	Town of Lyttelton	28 May	James FitzGerald	Resignation	Crosbie Ward
1858	Akaroa	31 May	John Cuff	Resignation	William Moorhouse
1858	Dunedin Country	16 June	John Cargill	Resignation	John Taylor
1858	Wairarapa and Hawke's Bay	22 July	J. Valentine Smith	Resignation	James Ferguson
1858	City of Wellington	27 July	Isaac Featherston; William Fitzherbert	Resignations	Isaac Featherston; William Rhodes
1858	Wellington Country	29 July	Dudley Ward	Resignation	Alfred Brandon
1858	Hutt	31 July	Dillon Bell; Samuel Revans	Resignations	Alfred Renall; William Fitzherbert
1859	Town of Dunedin	14 January	James Macandrew	Resignation	James Macandrew
==== Supplementary election, 1859 ====
Cheviot		18 December			Edward Jollie
Marsden		29 November			James Farmer
Wairarapa		7 November			Charles Carter
Wallace		30 November			Dillon Bell
By-election	Electorate	Date	Incumbent	Reason	Winner
==== 2nd Parliament (continued) ====
1859	Waimea	26 December	William Travers	Resignation	Fedor Kelling
1860	Town of Christchurch	18 January	Richard Packer	Resignation	Henry Sewell
1860 (1st)	Suburbs of Auckland	25 January	Walter Brodie	Resignation	Theophilus Heale
1860	Dunedin Country	28 March	William Cargill	Resignation	Thomas Gillies
1860 (1st)	Christchurch Country	2 April	John Ollivier	Resignation	Isaac Cookson
1860	City of Auckland	5 April	Thomas Beckham	Resignation	Archibald Clark
1860 (2nd)	Suburbs of Auckland	5 April	Frederick Merriman	Resignation	Joseph Hargreaves
1860	Omata	16 April	Alfred East	Resignation	James Richmond
1860 (2nd)	Christchurch Country	21 April	John Hall	Resignation	Charles Hunter Brown
1860	County of Hawke	26 April	James Ferguson	Resignation	Thomas Fitzgerald
1860	Northern Division	23 May	Thomas Henderson	Resignation	Thomas Henderson
1860	Grey and Bell	28 May	Charles Brown	Resignation	Thomas King
1860 (3rd)	Suburbs of Auckland	4 August	Joseph Hargreaves	Resignation	John Logan Campbell
=== 3rd Parliament (1861–1865) ===
1861	Grey and Bell	20 June	William King	Death	Harry Atkinson
1861	Suburbs of Nelson	20 June	James Wemyss	Resignation	William Wells
1861	Napier	1 July	Henry Stark	Resignation	William Colenso
1861	Wanganui	5 July	Henry Harrison	Resignation	Henry Harrison
1862 (1st)	City of Dunedin	17 March	Thomas Dick	Resignation	Thomas Dick
1862	Town of New Plymouth	5 May	William Richmond	Resignation	Isaac Watt
1862 (2nd)	City of Dunedin	30 May	Edward McGlashan	Resignation	John Richardson
1862	Ellesmere	9 June	Thomas Rowley	Resignation	James FitzGerald
1862	Avon	11 June	Alfred Creyke	Resignation	William Thomson
1862	Heathcote	12 June	George Hall	Resignation	William Moorhouse
1862	City of Auckland West	14 June	Josiah Firth	Resignation	James Williamson
1862	Bruce	31 July	Charles Kettle	Death	Edward Cargill
1862 (3rd)	City of Dunedin	15 November	John Richardson	Resignation	James Paterson
1862	Hampden	4 December	Thomas Fraser	Absence	John Jones
==== Supplementary election, 1863 ====
Dunedin and Suburbs North		28 March 1863			John Richardson
Dunedin and Suburbs South		6 April 1863			William Reynolds
Gold Fields		14 April 1863			William Baldwin; George Brodie
By-election	Electorate	Date	Incumbent	Reason	Winner
==== 3rd Parliament (continued) ====
1863	Dunedin and Suburbs South	20 June	James Paterson	Resignation	James Paterson
1863	Hampden	2 July	John Jones	Resignation	Frederick Wayne
1863	Kaiapoi	2 September	Isaac Cookson	Resignation	Robert Wilkin
1863	Dunedin and Suburbs North	3 September	Thomas Dick	Resignation	Julius Vogel
1863	Town of New Plymouth	9 October	Isaac Watt	Resignation	Henry Turton
1863	Heathcote	28 October	William Moorhouse	Resignation	Alfred Cox
1863	Akaroa	30 October	Augustus White	Resignation	Lancelot Walker
1864	Franklin	13 October	Marmaduke Nixon	Death (KIA)	Theodore Haultain
1864	Town of New Plymouth	18 November	Henry Turton	Resignation	Charles Brown
1864	Waimea	29 November	Alfred Saunders	Resignation	John Miles
1865 (1st)	Bruce	8 April	Thomas Gillies	Resignation	Arthur Burns
1865	Raglan	19 April	Charles Taylor	Resignation	William Buckland
1865	Parnell	20 April	Reader Wood	Resignation	Robert Creighton
1865	Town of New Plymouth	19 May	Charles Brown	Resignation	Henry Sewell
1865	Gold Fields	29 May	William Baldwin	Resignation	Charles Haughton
1865	Rangitiki	10 July	William Fox	Resignation	Robert Pharazyn
1865	Omata	18 July	James Richmond	Appointed to Legislative Council	Francis Gledhill
1865 (2nd)	Bruce	26 July	Edward Cargill	Resignation	James Macandrew
1865	Wairarapa	29 July	Charles Carter	Resignation	Henry Bunny
=== 4th Parliament (1866–1870) ===
1866	Mount Herbert	27 July	William Moorhouse	Chose to represent Westland	Thomas Potts
1866	Port Chalmers	15 December	Thomas Dick	Resignation	Thomas Dick
1867	City of Dunedin	19 January	William Reynolds	Resignation	William Reynolds
1867	City of Christchurch	13 February	James FitzGerald	Resignation	William Travers
1867	Avon	11 March	Crosbie Ward	Resignation	William Reeves
1867	City of Auckland West	25 April	James Williamson	Resignation	Patrick Dignan
1867	Manuherikia	27 April	William Baldwin	Resignation	David Mervyn
1867	Wanganui	27 April	John Bryce	Resignation	Henry Harrison
1867	Town of New Plymouth	29 April	John Richardson	Resignation	Harry Atkinson
1867	Raglan	4 June	Joseph Newman	Resignation	James Farmer
1867	Parnell	5 June	Frederick Whitaker	Resignation	Charles Heaphy
1867	Port Chalmers	15 June	Thomas Dick	Resignation	David Main
1867	Waimea	28 June	Arthur Oliver	Resignation	Edward Baigent
1867	Lyttelton	1 July	Edward Hargreaves	Resignation	George Macfarlan
1867	Northern Division	1 July	Thomas Henderson	Resignation	Thomas Macfarlane
1867	Kaiapoi	5 July	Joseph Beswick	Resignation	John Studholme
1867	Picton	25 July	Arthur Beauchamp	Resignation	William Adams
1867	Pensioner Settlements	5 August	Paul de Quincey	Resignation	John Kerr
1867	Ashley	7 August	Lancelot Walker	Resignation	Henry Tancred
1868	Omata	7 February	Arthur Atkinson	Resignation	Charles Brown
1868	Collingwood	18 March	Andrew Richmond	Resignation	Arthur Collins
1868	Westland Boroughs	3 April	William Moorhouse	Resignation	William Harrison
==== Supplementary election, 1868 ====
Westland North		9 April 1868			Timothy Gallagher
Westland South		6 April 1868			Edmund Barff
==== First Māori elections ====
Eastern Maori		15 April 1868			Tāreha Te Moananui
Northern Maori		15 April 1868			Frederick Russell
Southern Maori		20 June 1868			John Patterson
Western Maori		1 May 1868			Mete Kīngi Paetahi
By-election	Electorate	Date	Incumbent	Reason	Winner
==== 4th Parliament (continued) ====
1868	Avon	8 June	William Reeves	Resignation	William Rolleston
1868	Picton	11 June	William Adams	Resignation	Courtney Kenny
1868	Rangitiki	22 June	William Watt	Resignation	William Fox
1868	Franklin	2 July	Robert Graham	Resignation	William Swan
1868	Waikouaiti	27 July	William Murison	Resignation	Robert Mitchell
1868	Lyttelton	2 November	George Macfarlan	Death	John Peacock
1868	Timaru	20 November	Alfred Cox	Resignation	Edward Stafford
1868	City of Nelson	24 December	Edward Stafford	Resignation	Nathaniel Edwards
1869	Marsden	25 January	Francis Hull	Resignation	John Munro
1869	Roslyn	12 February	George Hepburn	Resignation	Henry Driver
1869	City of Dunedin	5 March	James Paterson	Resignation	Thomas Birch
1869	Northern Division	15 March	James O'Neill	Resignation	Harry Farnall
1869	Newton	19 March	George Graham	Resignation	Robert Creighton
1869	Waikouaiti	27 April	Robert Mitchell	Resignation	Francis Rich
1869	Town of New Plymouth	28 April	Harry Atkinson	Resignation	Thomas Kelly
1869 (1st)	Wallace	30 April	Alexander McNeill	Resignation	Cuthbert Cowan
1869	Oamaru	25 May	Robert Campbell	Resignation	Charles Graham
1869	Taieri	19 June	Donald Reid	Resignation	Henry Howorth
1869 (2nd)	Wallace	17 September	Cuthbert Cowan	Resignation	George Webster
1870	Bruce	21 March	John Cargill	Resignation	James Brown
1870	Mongonui	30 March	Thomas Ball	Resignation	Thomas Gillies
1870	Caversham	25 April	Arthur John Burns	Resignation	James McIndoe
1870	Omata	27 April	Charles Brown	Resignation	Frederic Carrington
1870	Parnell	12 May	Charles Heaphy	Resignation	Reader Wood
1870	Riverton	18 May	Donald Hankinson	Resignation	Lauchlan McGillivray
1870	Westland North	2 July	Timothy Gallagher	Resignation	Thomas Kynnersley
1870	City of Christchurch	12 August	William Travers	Resignation	William Moorhouse
=== 5th Parliament (1871–1875) ===
1871	City of Auckland West	1 September	John Williamson	Election Invalid	John Williamson
1871	Roslyn	12 September	Henry Driver	Resignation	Edward McGlashan
1872	Wairau	19 February	William Henry Eyes	Resignation	Arthur Seymour
1872	Waikato	1 March	James McPherson	Resignation	William Jackson
1872	Wakatipu	13 March	Charles Edward Haughton	Resignation	Bendix Hallenstein
1872	Rodney	16 March	Harry Farnall	Resignation	John Sheehan
1872	City of Nelson	27 May	Martin Lightband	Resignation	David Luckie
1872	Waikouaiti	12 June	George McLean	Resignation	David Monro
1872	Coleridge	23 July	John Karslake	Resignation	William Bluett
1872	Heathcote	30 July	John Hall	Resignation	John Wilson
1872	Caversham	28 August	Richard Cantrell	Resignation	William Tolmie
1872	Egmont	3 October	William Gisborne	Resignation	Harry Atkinson
1873	Suburbs of Nelson	14 May	Ralph Richardson	Resignation	Andrew Richmond
1873	Lyttelton	19 May	John Peacock	Resignation	Henry Webb
1873	Invercargill	22 May	William Henderson Calder	Resignation	John Cuthbertson
1873	Waikouaiti	23 July	David Monro	Resignation	John Lillie Gillies
1873	Mongonui and Bay of Islands	24 July	John McLeod	Resignation	John Williams
1873	Wakatipu	19 August	Bendix Hallenstein	Resignation	Vincent Pyke
1873	Collingwood	9 December	Arthur Collins	Resignation	William Gibbs
1874	Franklin	9 April	Archibald Clark	Resignation	Joseph May
1874 (1st)	Akaroa	20 April	Robert Rhodes	Resignation	William Montgomery
1874	City of Dunedin	23 April	John Bathgate	Resignation	Nathaniel Wales
1874	Waitemata	3 August	Thomas Henderson	Resignation	Gustav von der Heyde
1874 (2nd)	Akaroa	10 August	William Montgomery	Election invalid	William Montgomery
1874	Waitemata	16 September	Gustav von der Heyde	unseated on petition	Gustav von der Heyde
1875	Kaiapoi	22 January	John Studholme	Resignation	Charles Bowen
1875 (1st)	City of Auckland West	27 March	Thomas Gillies	Appointed to Supreme Court	George Grey
1875 (2nd)	City of Auckland West	14 April	John Williamson	Death	Patrick Dignan
1875	Rangitikei	24 April	William Fox	Resignation	John Ballance
1875	Waikouaiti	3 May	John Lillie Gillies	Resignation	George McLean
1875	Wairau	21 June	Arthur Seymour	Resignation	Joseph Ward
1875	Wallace	6 August	George Webster	Death	Christopher Basstian
1875	Caversham	20 August	William Tolmie	Death	Robert Stout
=== 6th Parliament (1876–1879) ===
1876	City of Auckland West	25 July	George Grey	Resignation	Benjamin Tonks
1876	Wanganui	27 September	Julius Vogel	Resignation	William Fox
1877	Napier	15 February	Donald McLean	Death	Fred Sutton
1877	City of Wellington	27 March	Edward Pearce	Resignation	William Travers
1877	Totara	30 April	George Henry Tribe	Death	William Gisborne
1877	City of Auckland West	2 May	Benjamin Tonks	Resignation	James Wallis
1877	Wairarapa	3 July	John Andrew	Resignation	George Beetham
1878	City of Wellington	18 February	William Travers	Resignation	George Elliott Barton
1878	Parnell	20 February	Reader Wood	Resignation	Frederick Moss
1878	Timaru	8 April	Edward Stafford	Resignation	Richard Turnbull
1878	Port Chalmers	12 April	William Reynolds	Resignation	James Green
1878	Franklin	20 May	Hugh Lusk	Resignation	Richard Hobbs
1878	Cheviot	21 May	Leonard Harper	Resignation	Alfred Saunders
1878	Grey Valley	22 May	Martin Kennedy	Resignation	Richard Reeves
1878	Hokitika	26 June	Charles Button	Resignation	Seymour Thorne George
1878	City of Dunedin	3 July	William Larnach	Resignation	Richard Oliver
1878	Taieri	11 July	Donald Reid	Resignation	William Cutten
1878	Invercargill	17 July	George Lumsden	Resignation	Henry Feldwick
1878	Waipa	24 July	Alfred Cox	Resignation	Edward Graham McMinn
1878	Roslyn	29 July	Arthur John Burns	Resignation	Henry Driver
1879	Gladstone	3 January	Frederick Teschemaker	Death	John Studholme
1879	Mataura	15 January	William Wood	Resignation	James Shanks
1879	City of Nelson	6 February	John Sharp	Resignation	Acton Adams
1879	City of Auckland West	4 March	Patrick Dignan	Resignation	David Goldie
1879	Coleridge	8 May	Cathcart Wason	Resignation	George Hart
1879	Hutt	2 July	William Fitzherbert	Resignation	Henry Jackson
1879	Eastern Maori	7 July	Karaitiana Takamoana	Death	Henare Tomoana
1879	Southern Maori	7 July	Hōri Kerei Taiaroa	Resignation	Ihaia Tainui
1879	City of Dunedin	15 July	Robert Stout	Resignation	William Downie Stewart
=== 7th Parliament (1879–1881) ===
1880	Rangitikei	8 May	William Jarvis Willis	Resignation	William Fox
1880	Waitaki	16 June	Thomas William Hislop	Resignation	George Jones
1880	Waikaia	21 September	George Ireland	Death	Horace Bastings
1881	Suburbs of Nelson	11 January	Andrew Richmond	Death	Arthur Collins
1881	Southern Maori	1 March	Ihaia Tainui	Resignation	Hōri Kerei Taiaroa
1881	City of Nelson	7 June	Acton Adams	Resignation	Henry Levestam
1881	Grey Valley	16 June	Edward Masters	Resignation	Thomas S. Weston
=== 8th Parliament (1882–1884) ===
1882	Franklin North	9 June	Benjamin Harris	Election declared void	Benjamin Harris
1882	Wakanui	16 June	Cathcart Wason	Election declared void	Joseph Ivess
1882	Stanmore	11 July	Walter Pilliet	Election declared void	Walter Pilliet
1883	Peninsula	22 January	James Seaton	Death	William Larnach
1883	Selwyn	6 April	John Hall	Resignation	Edward Lee
1883	Inangahua	14 May	Thomas S. Weston	Resignation	Edward Shaw
1883	Bruce	29 June	James Rutherford	Death	James McDonald
1884	Selwyn	15 February	Edward Lee	Death	Edward Wakefield
1884	Thorndon	13 May	William Levin	Resignation	Alfred Newman
1884	Kaiapoi	16 May	Isaac Wilson	Resignation	Edward Richardson
1884	East Coast	16 June	Allan McDonald	Resignation	Samuel Locke
=== 9th Parliament (1884–1887) ===
1885	Oamaru	20 May	Samuel Shrimski	Resignation	Thomas William Hislop
1885 (1st)	Tauranga	22 May	George Morris	Resignation	John Sheehan
1885	Waimea	3 June	Joseph Shephard	Resignation	John Kerr
1885	Southern Maori	10 June	Hōri Kerei Taiaroa	Resignation	Tame Parata
1885	Wakanui	6 July	John Grigg	Resignation	Joseph Ivess
1885 (2nd)	Tauranga	11 July	John Sheehan	Death	Lawrence Grace
1885	Bruce	5 August	Robert Gillies	Resignation	Donald Reid
1886	Sydenham	12 May	William White	Resignation	Richard Taylor
1886	Dunedin Central	19 October	James Bradshaw	Death	Thomas Bracken
1886	Waitemata	11 December	William Hurst	Death	Richard Monk
1886	Western Maori	23 December	Te Puke Te Ao	Death	Hoani Taipua
1887	Heathcote	8 February	John Coster	Death	Frederic Jones
1887	Port Chalmers	6 April	James Macandrew	Death	James Mills
1887	Te Aro	15 April	Charles Johnston	Resignation	Francis Fraser
1887	Northern Maori	9 May	Ihaka Hakuene	Death	Wi Katene
1887	Avon	1 June	Leonard Harper	Resignation	Edwin Blake
=== 10th Parliament (1887–1890) ===
1888	Ashley	25 July	William Pearson	Death	John Verrall
1889	Lincoln	16 January	Arthur O'Callaghan	Resignation	Alfred Saunders
1889	City of Nelson	3 April	Henry Levestam	Death	Joseph Harkness
1889	Christchurch North	19 June	Julius Vogel	Resignation	Edward Humphreys
1889	Oamaru	30 September	Thomas William Hislop	Resignation	Thomas William Hislop
1889	Waipa	21 November	William Jackson	Death	John Bryce
1889	East Coast	13 December	Andrew Graham	Resignation	Alexander Creighton Arthur
1890	Timaru	18 August	Richard Turnbull	Death	William Hall-Jones

== Liberal Party era ==
Key

Liberal Conservative Independent Liberal Liberal–Labour Independent

Electorate and by-election		Date	Incumbent	Cause	Winner
=== 11th Parliament (1891–1893) ===
Northern Maori	1891	7 February	Sydney Taiwhanga	Death	Eparaima Te Mutu Kapa
Egmont	1891	17 February	Harry Atkinson	Appointed to Legislative Council	Felix McGuire
Newton	1891	31 March	David Goldie	Resignation	Sir George Grey
Te Aroha	1891	9 July	William Allen	Disallowed on petition	William Fraser
Waikato	1891	6 October	John Bryce	Resignation	Edward Lake
City of Christchurch	1891	9 October	Westby Perceval	Appointed Agent General	Ebenezer Sandford
City of Wellington	1892	15 January	Kennedy Macdonald	Resignation	William McLean
Bruce	1892	4 May	James Thomson	Resignation	James Allen
Rangitikei	1892	8 July	Douglas Macarthur	Death	Robert Bruce
Inangahua	1893	8 June	Richard Reeves	Bankruptcy	Sir Robert Stout
Wanganui	1893	9 June	John Ballance	Death	Archibald Willis
Thames	1893	26 July	Alfred Cadman	Resignation	James McGowan
City of Auckland	1893	4 August	William Rees	Resignation	Alfred Cadman
=== 12th Parliament (1894–1896) ===
Waitemata	1894	9 April	Richard Monk	Election declared invalid	William Massey
Tuapeka	1894	9 July	Vincent Pyke	Death	William Larnach
City of Auckland	1895	24 July	Sir George Grey	Resignation	Thomas Thompson
City of Christchurch	1896	13 February	William Pember Reeves	Appointed Agent-General	Charles Lewis
=== 13th Parliament (1897–1899) ===
Suburbs of Wellington	1897	23 April	Thomas Wilford	Election declared void	Charles Wilson
Awarua	1897	5 August	Sir Joseph Ward	Bankruptcy	Sir Joseph Ward
City of Dunedin	1897	13 October	Henry Fish	Death	Alexander Sligo
City of Wellington	1898	9 March	Sir Robert Stout	Resignation	John Duthie
Mataura	1898	26 May	George Richardson	Bankruptcy	Robert McNab
Tuapeka	1898	2 November	William Larnach	Death	Charles Rawlins
City of Wellington	1899	25 July	John Hutcheson	Resignation	John Hutcheson
=== 14th Parliament (1900–1902) ===
Otaki	1900	6 January	Henry Augustus Field	Death	William Hughes Field
City of Auckland	1900	27 April	William Crowther	Death	Joseph Witheford
Waihemo	1900	18 July	John McKenzie	Resignation	Thomas Mackenzie
Northern Maori	1901	9 January	Hōne Heke Ngāpua	Bankruptcy	Hōne Heke Ngāpua
City of Christchurch	1901	18 July	Charles Lewis	Resignation	George Smith
Patea	July 1901	18 July	George Hutchison	Resignation	Frederick Haselden
Patea	November 1901	6 November	Frederick Haselden	Election voided on petition	Frederick Haselden
Caversham	1901	19 December	Arthur Morrison	Death	Thomas Sidey
=== 15th Parliament (1903–1905) ===
Pahiatua	1904	28 July	John O'Meara	Death	Bill Hawkins
City of Wellington	1905	6 April	George Fisher	Death	Frank Fisher
=== 16th Parliament (1906–1908) ===
Westland	1906	13 July	Richard Seddon	Death	Tom Seddon
Manukau	1906	6 December	Matthew Kirkbride	Death	Frederic Lang
Taranaki	1907	4 May	Edward Smith	Death	Henry Okey
Tuapeka	1908	5 June	James Bennet	Death	William Chapple
=== 17th Parliament (1909–1911) ===
Thames	1909	4 February	James McGowan	Appointed to Legislative Council	Edmund Taylor
Northern Maori	1909	20 March	Hone Heke Ngapua	Death	Peter Buck
Rangitikei	1909	16 September	Arthur Remington	Death	Robert Smith
Auckland East	1910	16 June	Frederick Baume	Death	Arthur Myers
Christchurch North	1911	17 August	Tommy Taylor	Death	Leonard Isitt

== Multi-party era ==
Key

Liberal	Reform	Social Democrat	Independent
Labour	Country Party	Independent Labour	United	Ratana

Electorate and by-election		Date	Incumbent	Cause	Winner
=== 18th Parliament (1912–1914) ===
Egmont	1912	17 September	Thomas Mackenzie	Resignation	Charles Wilkinson
Grey	1913	17 & 24 July	Arthur Guinness	Death	Paddy Webb
Lyttelton	1913	9 & 16 December	George Laurenson	Death	James McCombs
=== 19th Parliament (1915–1919) ===
Dunedin Central	1915	3 February	Charles Statham	Resignation	Charles Statham
Bay of Islands	1915	8 June	Vernon Reed	Election declared void	William Stewart
Taumarunui	1915	15 June	William Jennings	Election declared void	William Jennings
Pahiatua	1916	17 August	James Escott	Death	Harold Smith
Hawke's Bay	1917	8 March	Robert McNab	Death	John Findlay
Bay of Islands	1917	17 March	William Stewart	Resignation	Vernon Reed
Grey	1917	24 November	Paddy Webb	Resignation	Paddy Webb
Wellington North	1918	12 February	Alexander Herdman	Resignation	John Luke
Southern Maori	1918	21 February	Taare Parata	Death	Hopere Uru
Grey	1918	29 May	Paddy Webb	Imprisonment	Harry Holland
Wellington Central	1918	3 October	Robert Fletcher	Death	Peter Fraser
Taranaki	1918	10 October	Henry Okey	Death	Sydney Smith
Palmerston	1918	19 December	David Buick	Death	Jimmy Nash
Wellington South	1918	19 December	Alfred Hindmarsh	Death	Bob Semple
=== 20th Parliament (1920–1922) ===
Bruce	1920	14 April	James Allen	Resignation	John Edie
Stratford	1920	6 May	Robert Masters	Election declared void	Robert Masters
Bay of Plenty	1920	30 September	William MacDonald	Death	Kenneth Williams
Patea	1921	13 April	Walter Powdrell	Death	Edwin Dixon
Auckland East	1921	2 November	Arthur Myers	Resignation	Clutha Mackenzie
Southern Maori	1922	25 January	Hopere Uru	Death	Henare Uru
Dunedin North	1922	21 June	Edward Kellett	Death	Jim Munro
=== 21st Parliament (1923–1925) ===
Tauranga	1923	28 March	William Herries	Death	Charles Macmillan
Oamaru	1923	1 May	John MacPherson	Election declared void	John Macpherson
Franklin	1925	17 June	William Massey	Death	Ewen McLennan
=== 22nd Parliament (1926–1928) ===
Eden	1926	15 April	James Parr	Appointed High Commissioner, UK	Rex Mason
Raglan	1927	29 September	Richard Bollard	Death	Lee Martin
=== 23rd Parliament (1929–1931) ===
Bay of Islands	1929	10 April	Harold Rushworth	Election declared void	Harold Rushworth
Hutt	1929	18 December	Thomas Wilford	Resignation	Walter Nash
Parnell	1930	7 May	Harry Jenkins	Resignation	Bill Endean
Invercargill	1930	13 August	Sir Joseph Ward	Death	Vincent Ward
Waipawa	1930	8 October	Sir George Hunter	Death	Albert Jull
Western Maori	1930	8 October	Sir Māui Pōmare	Death	Taite Te Tomo
Hauraki	1931	27 May	Arthur Hall	Death	Walter Massey
=== 24th Parliament (1932–1935) ===
Southern Maori	1932	3 August	Tuiti Makitānara	Death	Eruera Tirikātene
Motueka	1932	1 December	George Black	Death	Keith Holyoake
Lyttelton	1933	13 September	James McCombs	Death	Elizabeth McCombs
Buller	1933	22 November	Harry Holland	Death	Paddy Webb
Lyttelton	1935	24 July	Elizabeth McCombs	Death	Terry McCombs
=== 25th Parliament (1936–1938) ===
Manukau	1936	30 September	Bill Jordan	Appointed High Commissioner, UK	Arthur Osborne

== Two-party era (1938–1996) ==
Key

Labour National Independent Social Credit

Electorate and by-election		Date	Incumbent	Cause	Winner
=== 26th Parliament (1939–1943) ===
Christchurch South	1939	3 June	Ted Howard	Death	Robert Macfarlane
Auckland West	1940	18 May	Michael Joseph Savage	Death	Peter Carr
Waipawa	1940	16 November	Albert Jull	Death	Cyril Harker
Waitemata	1941	19 July	Jack Lyon	Death	Mary Dreaver
Bay of Plenty	1941	13 December	Gordon Hultquist	Death	Bill Sullivan
Mid-Canterbury	1942	27 January	Arthur Grigg	Death	Mary Grigg
Hauraki	1942	7 February	John Allen	Death	Andy Sutherland
Temuka	1942	7 February	Thomas Burnett	Death	Jack Acland
Christchurch East	1943	6 February	Tim Armstrong	Death	Mabel Howard
Northern Maori	1943	19 June	Paraire Karaka Paikea	Death	(by-election postponed by legislation)
=== 27th Parliament (1943–1946) ===
Awarua	1944	28 October	James Hargest	Death	George Herron
Western Maori	1945	10 February	Toko Ratana	Death	Matiu Ratana
Hamilton	1945	26 May	Frank Findlay	Death	Hilda Ross
Dunedin North	1945	21 July	Jim Munro	Death	Robert Walls
Raglan	1946	5 March	Robert Coulter	Death	Hallyburton Johnstone
=== 28th Parliament (1946–1949) ===
Avon	1947	28 May	Dan Sullivan	Death	Jock Mathison
Mount Albert	1947	24 September	Arthur Richards	Death	Warren Freer
Westland	1947	3 December	James O'Brien	Death	Jim Kent
=== 29th Parliament (1950–1951) ===
Brooklyn	1951	17 February	Peter Fraser	Death	Arnold Nordmeyer
=== 30th Parliament (1951–1954) ===
Dunedin North	1953	12 December	Robert Walls	Death	Ethel McMillan
Onehunga	1953	19 December	Arthur Osborne	Death	Hugh Watt
Onslow	1954	7 July	Harry Combs	Death	Henry May
Patea	1954	31 July	William Sheat	Resignation	William Sheat
=== 31st Parliament (1955–1957) ===
Riccarton	1956	27 October	Angus McLagan	Death	Mick Connelly
Bay of Plenty	1957	6 April	Bill Sullivan	Resignation	Percy Allen
=== 32nd Parliament (1958–1960) ===
Hamilton	1959	2 May	Dame Hilda Ross	Death	Lance Adams-Schneider
=== 33rd Parliament (1961–1963) ===
Hurunui	1961	10 June	William Gillespie	Death	Lorrie Pickering
Waitaki	1962	10 March	Thomas Hayman	Death	Allan Dick
Buller	1962	7 July	Jerry Skinner	Death	Bill Rowling
Timaru	1962	21 July	Clyde Carr	Resignation	Sir Basil Arthur
Otahuhu	1963	16 March	James Deas	Death	Bob Tizard
Northern Maori	1963	16 March	Tapihana Paikea	Death	Matiu Rata
Grey Lynn	1963	18 May	Fred Hackett	Death	Reginald Keeling
=== 34th Parliament (1964–1966) ===
There were no by-elections during the term of the 34th Parliament.
=== 35th Parliament (1967–1969) ===
Southern Maori	1967	11 March	Sir Eruera Tirikātene	Death	Whetu Tirikatene-Sullivan
Fendalton	1967	15 April	Harry Lake	Death	Eric Holland
Petone	1967	15 April	Michael Moohan	Death	Fraser Colman
Eastern Maori	1967	12 August	Puti Tipene Watene	Death	Paraone Reweti
Palmerston North	1967	2 December	Bill Brown	Death	Joe Walding
Hutt	1968	3 August	Sir Walter Nash	Death	Trevor Young
=== 36th Parliament (1970–1972) ===
Marlborough	1970	21 February	Tom Shand	Death	Ian Brooks
=== 37th Parliament (1973–1975) ===
Sydenham	1974	2 November	Norman Kirk	Death	John Kirk
=== 38th Parliament (1976–1978) ===
Nelson	1976	28 February	Sir Stanley Whitehead	Death	Mel Courtney
Mangere	1977	26 March	Colin Moyle	Resignation	David Lange
Pahiatua	1977	30 April	Sir Keith Holyoake	Appointed as Governor-General	John Falloon
Rangitikei	1978	18 February	Sir Roy Jack	Death	Bruce Beetham
=== 39th Parliament (1979–1981) ===
Christchurch Central	1979	18 August	Bruce Barclay	Death	Geoffrey Palmer
Northern Maori	1980	7 June	Matiu Rata	Resignation	Bruce Gregory
Onehunga	1980	7 June	Frank Rogers	Death	Fred Gerbic
East Coast Bays	1980	6 September	Frank Gill	Appointed as Ambassador to US	Gary Knapp
=== 40th Parliament (1982–1984) ===
There were no by-elections during the term of the 40th Parliament.
=== 41st Parliament (1984–1987) ===
Timaru	1985	15 June	Sir Basil Arthur	Death	Maurice McTigue
=== 42nd Parliament (1987–1990) ===
There were no by-elections during the term of the 42nd Parliament.
=== 43rd Parliament (1990–1993) ===
Tamaki	1992	15 February	Sir Robert Muldoon	Resignation	Clem Simich
Wellington Central	1992	12 December	Fran Wilde	Election as Mayor of Wellington	Chris Laidlaw
Tauranga	1993	17 April	Winston Peters	Resignation	Winston Peters
=== 44th Parliament (1993–1996) ===
Selwyn	1994	13 August	Ruth Richardson	Resignation	David Carter

== MMP era (1996–present) ==
Key

National Labour Māori Party Independent Mana NZ First

Electorate and by-election		Date	Incumbent	Cause	Winner
=== 45th Parliament (1996–1999) ===
Taranaki-King Country	1998	2 May	Jim Bolger	Resignation; appointed ambassador to Washington	Shane Ardern
=== 46th Parliament (1999–2002) ===
There were no by-elections during the term of the 46th Parliament.
=== 47th Parliament (2002–2005) ===
Te Tai Hauauru	2004	10 July	Tariana Turia	Resignation	Tariana Turia
=== 48th Parliament (2005–2008) ===
There were no by-elections during the term of the 48th Parliament.
=== 49th Parliament (2008–2011) ===
Mount Albert	2009	13 June	Helen Clark	Resignation; appointed to the UNDP	David Shearer
Mana	2010	20 November	Winnie Laban	Resignation	Kris Faafoi
Botany	2011	5 March	Pansy Wong	Resignation	Jami-Lee Ross
Te Tai Tokerau	2011	25 June	Hone Harawira	Resignation; established the Mana Movement	Hone Harawira
=== 50th Parliament (2011–2014) ===
Ikaroa-Rāwhiti	2013	29 June	Parekura Horomia	Death	Meka Whaitiri
Christchurch East	2013	30 November	Lianne Dalziel	Resignation; elected Mayor of Christchurch	Poto Williams
=== 51st Parliament (2014–2017) ===
Northland	2015	28 March	Mike Sabin	Resignation	Winston Peters
Mount Roskill	2016	3 December	Phil Goff	Resignation; elected Mayor of Auckland	Michael Wood
Mount Albert	2017	25 February	David Shearer	Resignation; appointed to head the United Nations Mission in South Sudan	Jacinda Ardern
=== 52nd Parliament (2017–2020) ===
Northcote	2018	9 June	Jonathan Coleman	Resignation	Dan Bidois
=== 53rd Parliament (2020–2023) ===
Tauranga	2022	18 June	Simon Bridges	Resignation	Sam Uffindell
Hamilton West	2022	10 December	Gaurav Sharma	Resignation	Tama Potaka
=== 54th Parliament (2023–present) ===
Port Waikato	2023	25 November	n/a	Death of candidate after close of nominations	Andrew Bayly
Tāmaki Makaurau	2025	6 September	Takutai Tarsh Kemp	Death	Oriini Kaipara

== See also ==
- Elections in New Zealand

== Bibliography ==
- Scholefield, Guy (1950) [First published in 1913]. New Zealand Parliamentary Record, 1840–1949 (3rd ed.). Wellington: Govt. Printer.
