= Richard Cantrell =

New Zealand politician

New Zealand Parliament
Years	Term	Electorate	Party
1871–1872	5th	Caversham	Independent

Richard Seaward Cantrell (1825 – 11 August 1872) was a 19th-century Member of Parliament from Dunedin, New Zealand.

Cantrell was born in England in 1825. He arrived in Dunedin in 1858 and took over the Commercial Hotel in December of that year.

Cantrell was one of four candidates in the 1866 election in the Caversham electorate, coming second but being decisively beaten by Arthur John Burns. Burns resigned after four years but Cantrell did not stand in the resulting 1870 Caversham by-election. The by-election was won by James McIndoe and at the 1871 election, Cantrell defeated McIndoe. On 27 March 1871, Cantrell was one of five candidates for the Otago Provincial Council, also for the Caversham electorate. He comfortably won this election.

Cantrell represented the (parliamentary) Caversham electorate until 1872, when he resigned due to ill health. He sent his resignation from Dunedin by mail on 1 August and while the resignation was read out by the speaker on 6 August, it took effect on 31 July (i.e. the day prior to sending it; presumably the date shown on the letter). He had also resigned from the provincial council, but as the council was out of session (the 30th session had finished on 31 May), the resignation could not be processed and his representation ended with his death.

At the provincial council, three candidates contested the resulting by-election on 15 August: Robert Stout (149 votes), Henry Fish (110 votes), and Richard Henry Leary (90 votes), with Stout thus elected. Cantrell's parliamentary resignation caused the 1872 Caversham by-election, which was held on 28 August and won by William Tolmie. Cantrell did not live to see either by-election; he died on 11 August aged 47 years. As captain of a volunteer unit (South District Rifles), he received a military funeral. He was survived by a family of six sons and two daughters.

New Zealand Parliament
Preceded by James McIndoe	Member of Parliament for Caversham; 1871–1872	Succeeded by William Tolmie
