= 1893 New Zealand general election =

1893 general election
- 28 November (general) & 20 December (Māori) 1893

All 74 seats in the New Zealand House of Representatives 38 seats were needed for a majority
- Turnout: 75.3%
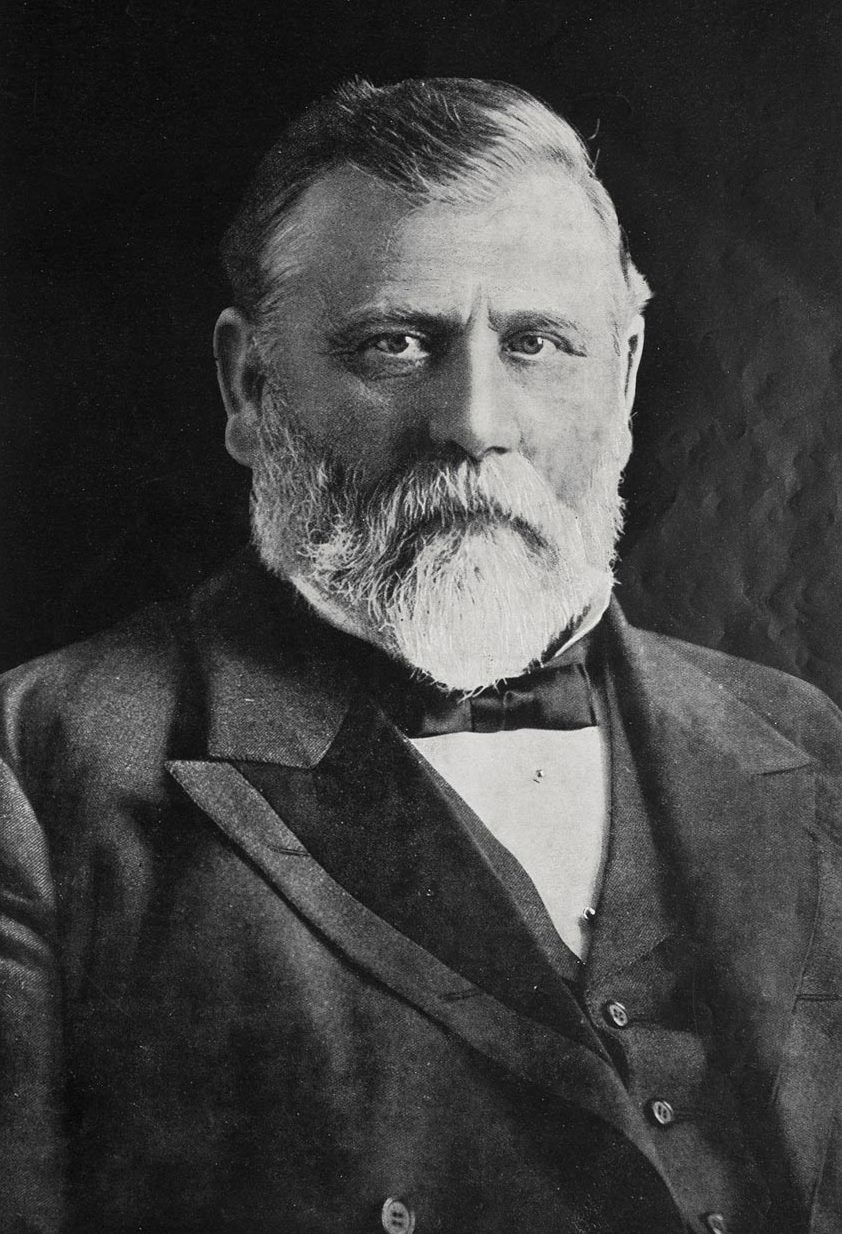

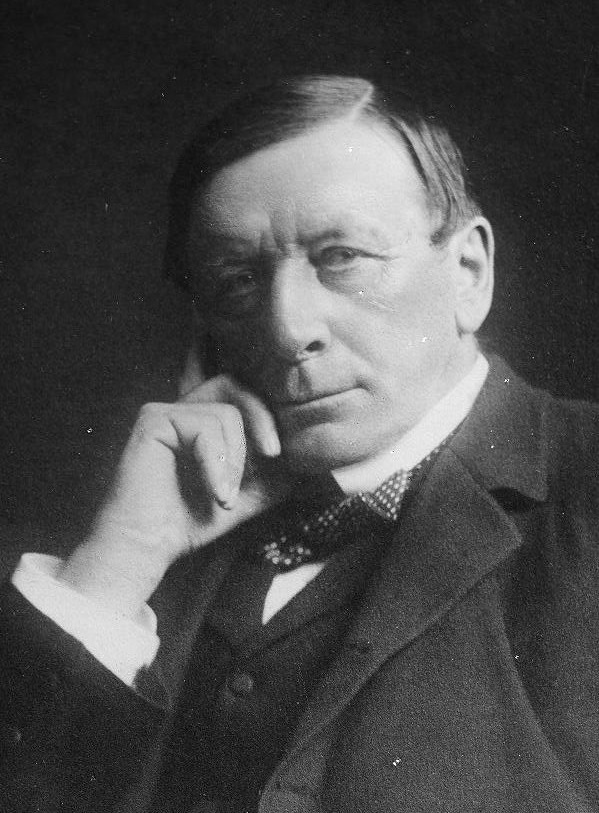
| | First party | Second party |
|---|---|---|
| Leader | Richard Seddon | William Rolleston |
| Party | Liberal | Conservative |
| Leader since | 28 April 1893 | 31 August 1891 |
| Leader's seat | Westland | Halswell (lost seat) |
| Last election | 40 seats, 56.1% | 25 seats, 28.9% |
| Seats won | 51 | 13 |
| Seat change | ▲11 | ▼12 |
| Popular vote | 175,814 | 74,482 |
| Percentage | 57.8% | 24.5% |
| Swing | ▲1.7% | ▼4.5% |
- Results of the election.
Premier before election
Richard Seddon
Liberal
Subsequent Premier
Richard Seddon
Liberal

The 1893 New Zealand general election was held on 28 November and 20 December in the European and Māori electorates, respectively, to elect 74 MPs to the 12th session of the New Zealand Parliament. The election was won by the Liberal Party, and Richard Seddon became prime minister.

1893 was the year universal suffrage was granted to women over 21 (including Māori), plural registration was abolished, plural voting for Māori property-owners was abolished, and only those whose descent was exactly half Māori were allowed to choose whether to vote in European or Māori electorates. Women's suffrage was the most consequential change.

== 1892 electoral redistribution ==
The previous electoral redistribution was undertaken in 1890 for the 1890 election. The 1891 New Zealand census was the first to automatically trigger an electoral redistribution, which was undertaken in 1892. The population drift to the North Island resulted in the transfer of one electorate from the south to the north. Only three electorates remained with unaltered boundaries: Thames, Wairarapa, and Timaru. 14 new electorates were established, and of those, eight electorates were established for the first time: Bay of Plenty, Otaki, Pareora, Patea, Riccarton, Waiapu, Waimea-Sounds, and Wellington Suburbs. The remaining six electorates had existed before, and they were re-established for the 12th Parliament: Caversham, Chalmers, Lyttelton, Rangitata, Waihemo, and Waipa.

== Women's suffrage ==
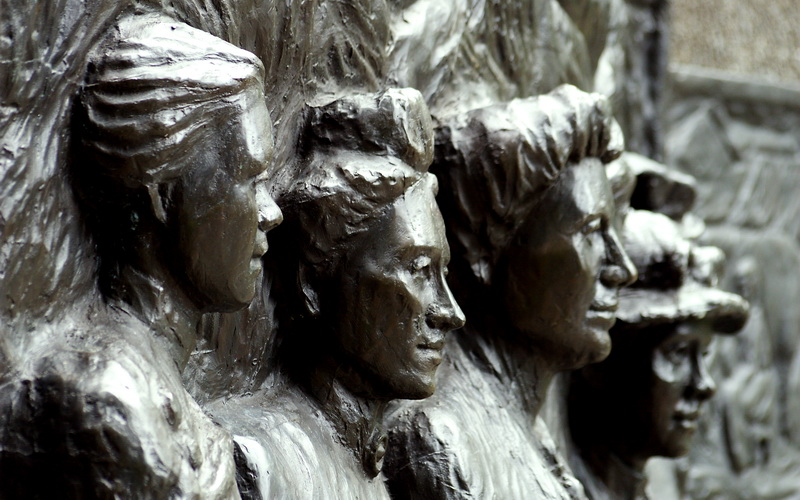
Kate Sheppard National Memorial in Christchurch adjacent to Our City. The figures shown from left to right are Amey Daldy, Kate Sheppard, Ada Wells and Harriet Morison

By far the most notable change for the 1893 election was that the Electoral Act, 1893, extended the franchise to all women (including Māori) aged 21 and over. Women's suffrage was granted after about two decades of campaigning by women such as Kate Sheppard and Mary Ann Müller and organisations such as the New Zealand branch of the Women's Christian Temperance Union led by Anne Ward. Of countries at present independent, New Zealand was the first to give women the vote in modern times. John Hall, a Conservative politician and former premier, received most of the credit for pushing the legislation through Parliament; he is the only male who has his name inscribed on the Kate Sheppard National Memorial. There were only 10 weeks between the passage of the legislation and the election, and the Woman's Christian Temperance Union (WCTU) set about to enrol as many women as possible.

The bill had passed under the Liberal government which generally advocated social and political reform, but only due to a combination of personality issues and political accident. Seddon opposed it (unlike many other Liberals) because many women supported prohibition. He had expected to stop the bill in the upper house, but found that one more vote was needed. Thomas Kelly, a new Liberal Party councillor had left himself paired in favour of the measure, but Seddon obtained his consent by wire to change his vote. Seddon's manipulation so incensed two opposition councillors, William Reynolds and Edward Stevens that they changed sides and voted for the bill, which was passed by 20 votes to 18 so giving the vote to women. Both the Liberals and the Conservatives subsequently claimed credit for sponsoring the enfranchisement of women and both sought to acquire women's votes, although the Liberals benefitted more.

== The election ==
The 1893 election was held on Tuesday, 28 November in the general electorates, and on Wednesday, 20 December in the Māori electorates to elect a total of 74 MPs to the 12th Parliament.

A total number of 302,997 (75.3%) voters turned out to vote. 65% of all eligible New Zealand women voted in the 1893 election. In 3 seats there was only one candidate. 31 and 39 electorates were in the North Island and South Island, respectively, plus the 4 Māori electorates.

== Results ==
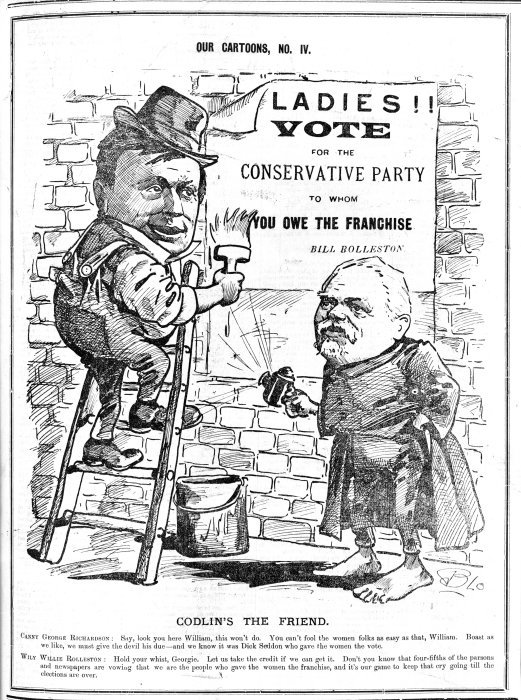
An 1893 cartoon depicting William Rolleston urging women to vote for the Conservative Party to whom they "owe the franchise".

=== Party totals ===
The following table gives party strengths and vote distribution according to Wilson (1985), who records Maori representatives as Independents prior to the 1905 election.

Election results
| Party | Candidates | Total votes | Percentage | Seats won | Change |
|---|---|---|---|---|---|
| Liberal | 103 | 175,814 | 57.80% | 51 | +11 |
| Conservative | 55 | 74,482 | 24.49% | 13 | -12 |
| Independent | 49 | 53,880 | 17.71% | 10 | +1 |
| Total | 207 | 302,997 | | 74 | |

=== Votes summary ===
Popular Vote
| Liberal and Liberal-Labour | 57.80% |
| Conservative | 24.49% |
| Independents | 17.71% |

Parliament seats
| Liberal | 68.91% |
| Conservative | 17.58% |
| Independents | 13.51% |

=== Electorate results ===
The following is a table of electorate results by electorate. Key

Liberal Conservative Liberal–Labour Independent Liberal Independent

Electorate results for the 1893 New Zealand general election
| Electorate | Incumbent | Winner | Majority | Runner up |
|---|---|---|---|---|
General electorates
| Ashburton | Edward George Wright | John McLachlan | 26 | Cathcart Wason |
| Ashley | Richard Meredith | | 590 | David Duncan Macfarlane |
| Auckland, City of | John Shera | George Grey | 2,233 | Thomas Tudehope (Note: Majority is difference in votes to fourth candidate) |
| Auckland, City of | Thomas Thompson | William Crowther | 438 | Thomas Tudehope |
| Auckland, City of | Alfred Cadman | Charles Button | 68 | Thomas Tudehope |
| Avon | Edwin Blake | William Tanner | 653 | George McIntyre |
| Awarua | Joseph Ward | | Uncontested | |
| Bay of Islands | Robert Houston | | 231 | James Trounsen |
| Bay of Plenty | New electorate | William Kelly | 209 | Henry Burton |
| Bruce | James Allen | | Uncontested | |
| Buller | Eugene O'Conor | Roderick McKenzie | 213 | Eugene O'Conor |
| Caversham | New electorate | Arthur Morrison | 136 | William Barron |
| Chalmers | New electorate | John A. Millar | 119 | Edmund Allen |
| Christchurch, City of | William Pember Reeves | | 1,848 | Ebenezer Sandford (Note: Majority is difference in votes to fourth candidate) |
| Christchurch, City of | Ebenezer Sandford | George Smith | 916 | Ebenezer Sandford |
| Christchurch, City of | Richard Molesworth Taylor | William Collins | 281 | Ebenezer Sandford |
| Clutha | Thomas Mackenzie | | 832 | James Burgh |
| Dunedin, City of | David Pinkerton | | 1,294 | Henry Fish (Note: Majority is difference in votes to fourth candidate) |
| Dunedin, City of | Henry Fish | William Earnshaw | 589 | Henry Fish |
| Dunedin, City of | William Hutchison | | 294 | Henry Fish |
| Eden | Edwin Mitchelson | | 1,161 | Malcolm Niccol |
| Egmont | Felix McGuire | | 135 | Benjamin Robbins |
| Ellesmere | John Hall | William Montgomery | 293 | William Rolleston |
| Franklin | Ebenezer Hamlin | Benjamin Harris | 89 | William Massey |
| Grey | Arthur Guinness | | 1,723 | Richard Nancarrow |
| Hawke's Bay | William Russell | | 70 | Charles William Reardon |
| Inangahua | Robert Stout | Patrick O'Regan | 204 | William Goodwin Collings |
| Invercargill | James Whyte Kelly | | 1,242 | Joseph Hatch |
| Kaiapoi | Richard Moore | David Buddo | 87 | Richard Moore |
| Lyttelton | New electorate | John Joyce | 1,041 | Edwin Blake |
| Manukau | Frank Buckland | Maurice O'Rorke | 252 | Frank Buckland |
| Marsden | Robert Thompson (Note: Robert Thompson was an independent in the previous Parliament) | | 1,010 | James Harrison |
| Masterton | Alexander Hogg | | 1,228 | Joseph Harkness |
| Mataura | George Richardson | Robert McNab | 119 | George Richardson |
| Napier | George Swan | Samuel Carnell | 520 | George Swan |
| Nelson | Joseph Harkness | John Graham | 279 | Richmond Hursthouse |
| New Plymouth | Edward Smith | | 491 | Robert Trimble |
| Oamaru | Tom Duncan | | 416 | PB Fraser |
| Otaki | New electorate | James Wilson | 195 | Donald Fraser |
| Palmerston | James Wilson | Frederick Pirani | 203 | George Matthew Snelson |
| Pareora | New electorate | Frederick Flatman | 217 | Arthur Rhodes |
| Parnell | Frank Lawry | | 334 | William Shepherd Allen |
| Patea | New electorate | George Hutchison | 673 | William Cowern |
| Rangitata | New electorate | William Maslin | 67 | Edward George Wright |
| Rangitikei | Robert Bruce | Jack Stevens | 176 | Frank Lethbridge |
| Riccarton | New electorate | George Russell | 106 | William Boag |
| Selwyn | Alfred Saunders | | 232 | Thomas Hamilton Anson |
| Taieri | Walter Carncross | | 76 | John Buckland |
| Thames | James McGowan | | 311 | Edmund Taylor |
| Timaru | William Hall-Jones | | 407 | Edward George Kerr |
| Tuapeka | Hugh Valentine | Vincent Pyke | 340 | Charles Rawlins |
| Waihemo | New electorate | John McKenzie | 324 | Scobie Mackenzie |
| Waiapu | New electorate | James Carroll | 497 | Cecil de Lautour |
| Waikato | Edward Lake | Alfred Cadman | 75 | Isaac Coates |
| Waikouaiti | James Green | | 510 | George J. Bruce |
| Waimea-Sounds | New electorate | Charlie Mills | 333 | H Everett |
| Waipa | New electorate | Frederic Lang | 989 | Gerald Peacock |
| Waipawa | William Smith | Charles Hall | 378 | George Hunter |
| Wairarapa | Wally Buchanan | | 690 | George Augustus Fairbrother |
| Wairau | Lindsay Buick | | 322 | William Sinclair |
| Waitaki | John McKenzie | William Steward | 1,062 | Thomas Paterson |
| Waitemata | Jackson Palmer | Richard Monk | 239 | Jackson Palmer |
| Wakatipu | Thomas Fergus | William Fraser | 326 | John O'Meara |
| Wallace | James Mackintosh | | 433 | Henry Hirst |
| Wanganui | Archibald Willis | | 197 | Gilbert Carson |
| Wellington, City of | John Duthie | | | Kennedy Macdonald |
| Wellington, City of | George Fisher | Francis Bell | | Kennedy Macdonald |
| Wellington, City of | William McLean | Sir Robert Stout | | Kennedy Macdonald |
| Wellington Suburbs | New electorate | Alfred Newman | 124 | Thomas Wilford |
| Westland | Richard Seddon | | Uncontested | |
Māori electorates (Note: The affiliation of many of the Māori candidates is unknown or uncertain)
| Eastern Maori | James Carroll | Wi Pere | 1,399 | Hoani Paraone Tunuiarangi |
| Northern Maori | Eparaima Te Mutu Kapa | Hone Heke Ngapua | 507 | Eparaima Te Mutu Kapa |
| Southern Maori | Tame Parata | | 185 | Teoti Pita Mutu |
| Western Maori | Hoani Taipua | Ropata Te Ao | 90 | Pepene Eketone |

Table footnotes:
