= 1872 Waikato by-election =

New Zealand by-election

The 1872 Waikato by-election was a by-election held on 1 March 1872 in the Waikato electorate in the Waikato region of New Zealand during the 5th New Zealand Parliament.

The by-election was caused by the resignation of the incumbent MP James McPherson on 20 December 1871.

The by-election was won by Major William Jackson. He was unopposed.

The election was delayed as the principal polling place was moved from Ngāruawāhia to Hamilton.
