= Caversham (New Zealand electorate) =

Caversham was a parliamentary electorate in the city of Dunedin in the Otago region of New Zealand, from 1866 to 1908.

== Population centres ==
In the 1865 electoral redistribution, the House of Representatives focussed its review of electorates to South Island electorates only, as the Otago gold rush had caused significant population growth, and a redistribution of the existing population. Fifteen additional South Island electorates were created, including Caversham, and the number of Members of Parliament was increased by 13 to 70. The Caversham electorate covered an area similar to the former Dunedin and Suburbs South electorate. Settlements located in the electorate were the Dunedin suburb of Caversham, and Macandrew Bay, Broad Bay, and Portobello.

== History ==
Caversham was first established in 1866 and abolished in 1890. It was recreated in 1893 and abolished again in 1908.

Arthur John Burns was the first representative, elected at the 1866 general election for the 4th New Zealand Parliament. He resigned before the end of the term in 1870. James McIndoe won the subsequent 1870 by-election, held on 25 April. He was defeated at the 1871 general election by Richard Cantrell. Cantrell resigned in the following year, and the subsequent 1872 by-election was won by William Tolmie. Before the end of the term, Tolmie died on 8 August 1875. The 20 August 1875 by-election was won by Robert Stout, who contested the City of Dunedin electorate a few months later at the 1875–76. James Seaton was successful in Caversham at that election, but he retired in 1879. William Barron represented the electorate from the 1879 general election until the seat was first abolished in 1890.

When the seat was recreated for the 1893 general election, Arthur Morrison was the successful candidate. He represented the electorate until he died on 21 November 1901. Thomas Sidey won the 1901 by-election and held the seat until it was abolished in 1908, when he was elected for the Dunedin South electorate instead.

=== Members of Parliament ===
Caversham was represented by nine Members of Parliament.

Key

Independent Liberal–Labour Liberal

Election	Winner
1866 election	Arthur John Burns
1870 by-election	James McIndoe
1871 election	Richard Cantrell
1872 by-election	William Tolmie
1875 by-election	Robert Stout
1875 election	James Seaton
1879 election	William Barron
1881 election	William Barron
1884 election	William Barron
1887 election	William Barron
(Electorate abolished 1890–1893)
1893 election	Arthur Morrison
1896 election	Arthur Morrison
1899 election	Arthur Morrison
1901 by-election	Thomas Sidey
1902 election	Thomas Sidey
1905 election	Thomas Sidey
(Electorate abolished 1908)

== Election results ==
=== 1901 by-election ===
1901 Caversham by-election
Party	Candidate	Votes	%	±%
Liberal	Thomas Sidey	1,620	35.58	
Liberal–Labour	William Earnshaw	1,515	33.27	
Labour	Patrick Hally	1,120	24.59	
Independent	Harry Bedford	149	3.27	
Conservative	William Henry Warren	122	2.67	−35.32
Independent	John James Meikle	27	0.59	
Majority		105	2.30	
Turnout		4,553		−59

=== 1899 election ===
1899 general election: Caversham
Party	Candidate	Votes	%	±%
Liberal–Labour	Arthur Morrison	2,860	62.01	
Conservative	William Henry Warren	1,752	37.99	
Majority		1,108	24.02	
Turnout		4,612	74.98	
Registered electors		6,151		

=== 1893 election ===
1893 general election: Caversham
Party	Candidate	Votes	%	±%
Liberal–Labour	Arthur Morrison	1,335	51.70	
Independent	William Barron	1,199	46.44	
Conservative	George Munro	48	1.86	
Majority		136	5.27	
Turnout		2,582	73.79	
Registered electors		3,499		

=== 1875 by-election ===
1875 Caversham by-election
Party	Candidate	Votes	%	±%
Independent	Robert Stout	232	52.37	
Independent	William Larnach	211	47.63	
Majority		11	4.74	
Turnout		443		

=== 1872 by-election ===
1872 Caversham by-election
Party	Candidate	Votes	%	±%
Independent	William Tolmie	217	58.65	
Independent	William Cutten	152	41.08	
Independent	James Crowe Richmond	1	0.27	
Turnout		370		
Majority		65	17.57	

=== 1871 election ===
1871 general election: Caversham
Party	Candidate	Votes	%	±%
Independent	Richard Cantrell	165	55.00	
Independent	James McIndoe	107	35.67	−26.99
Independent	James Gardner Scott	28	9.33	
Majority		58	19.33	
Turnout		300	44.38	
Registered electors		676		

=== 1870 by-election ===
1870 Caversham by-election
Party	Candidate	Votes	%	±%
Independent	James McIndoe	146	62.66	
Independent	William Cutten	71	30.47	
Independent	John Graham	16	6.87	
Independent	William Robertson	9	3.86	
Turnout		349		
Majority		39	11.17	

=== 1866 election ===
1866 general election: Caversham
Party	Candidate	Votes	%	±%
Independent	Arthur John Burns	88	48.62	
Independent	Richard Cantrell	47	25.97	
Independent	William Robertson	43	23.76	
Independent	James Gordon Stuart Grant	3	1.66	
Majority		41	22.65	
Turnout		181	43.51	
Registered electors		416		
