= 1872 Caversham by-election =

New Zealand by-election

The 1872 Caversham by-election was a by-election held on 28 August 1872 in the Caversham electorate in the Otago region of New Zealand during the 5th New Zealand Parliament.

The by-election was caused by the resignation of the incumbent Richard Cantrell, on 31 July 1872.

The by-election was won by William Tolmie. His opponent William Cutten had also stood in the 1870 Caversham by-election. James Crowe Richmond was nominated but withdrew before the election; he received one vote.

== Results ==
1872 Caversham by-election
| Party | Candidate | Votes | % | ±% |
|---|---|---|---|---|
| Independent | William Tolmie | 217 | 58.65 | |
| Independent | William Cutten | 152 | 41.08 | |
| Independent | James Crowe Richmond | 1 | 0.27 | |
| Turnout | | 370 | | |
| Majority | | 65 | 17.57 | |

There were five polling booths. Tolmie won at four of them, and Cutten had a majority at the Andersons Bay booth.

| | Tolmie | Cutten | Richmond |
|---|---|---|---|
| Caversham | 85 | 66 | 1 |
| Green Island | 45 | 28 | 0 |
| Andersons Bay | 36 | 51 | 0 |
| North Harbour | 12 | 0 | 0 |
| Portobello | 39 | 7 | 0 |
| | 217 | 152 | 1 |
