= William Tolmie =

William Tolmie may refer to:

- William Tolmie (politician), (1833–1875) New Zealand politician
- William Fraser Tolmie, Scottish-born Hudson's Bay Company agent
