= 1878 Taieri by-election =

New Zealand by-election

The 1878 Taieri by-election was a by-election held on 11 July 1878 during the 6th New Zealand Parliament in the electorate of Taieri in Otago.

The by-election was caused by the resignation of the incumbent MP Donald Reid on 6 June 1878.

The by-election was won by William Cutten.

== Results ==
The following table gives the election result:

1878 Taieri by-election
Party	Candidate	Votes	%	±%
Independent	William Cutten	234	33.86	
Independent	William Snow	232	33.57	
Independent	Mr Barron	225	32.56	
Majority		2	0.29	
Turnout		691		
