= 1901 Caversham by-election =

New Zealand by-election

- 19 December 1901
- Turnout: 4,553
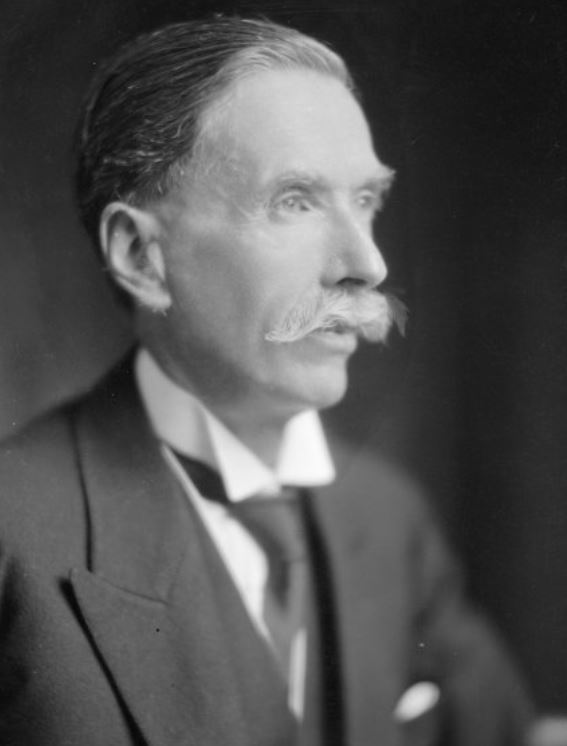

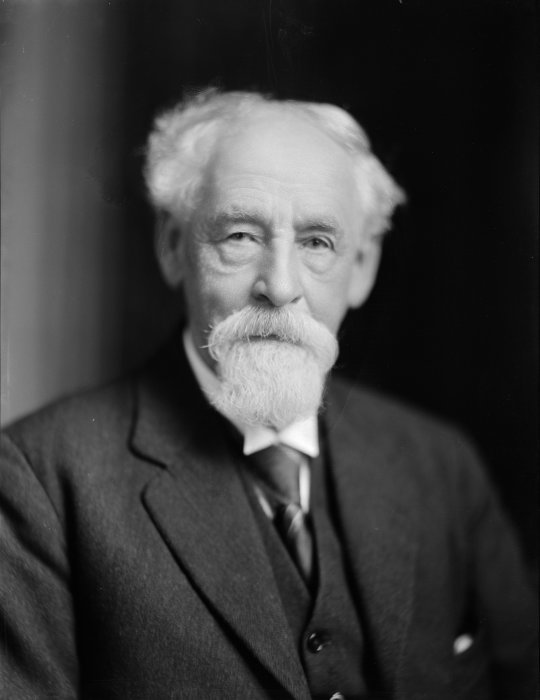

Candidate	Thomas Sidey	William Earnshaw	Patrick Hally
Party	Liberal	Liberal–Labour	Labour
Popular vote	1,620	1,515	1,120
Percentage	35.58	33.27	24.59
Member before election
Arthur Morrison
Liberal–Labour
Elected Member
Thomas Sidey
Liberal

The 1901 Caversham by-election was a by-election in the New Zealand electorate of Caversham, an urban seat in Dunedin at the south-east of the South Island.

== Background ==
The by-election was held on 19 December 1901, and was precipitated by the death of sitting MP, Arthur Morrison. The seat was won by fellow Liberal Thomas Sidey.

There was a large crowd at the declaration of the results, the crowd was rather rowdy and many rotten eggs were thrown at runner-up William Earnshaw.

== Results ==
The following table gives the election results:

1901 Caversham by-election
Party	Candidate	Votes	%	±%
Liberal	Thomas Sidey	1,620	35.58	
Liberal–Labour	William Earnshaw	1,515	33.27	
Labour	Patrick Hally	1,120	24.59	
Independent	Harry Bedford	149	3.27	
Conservative	William Henry Warren	122	2.67	−35.32
Independent	John James Meikle	27	0.59	
Majority		105	2.30	
Turnout		4,553		−59
