= 1871 Roslyn by-election =

New Zealand by-election

The 1871 Roslyn by-election was a by-election for the electorate of Roslyn in Dunedin on 12 September 1871 during the 5th New Zealand Parliament.

The by-election resulted from the resignation of the previous member Henry Driver on 15 August 1871.

The by-election was won by Edward McGlashan. Five candidates contested the by-election.

== Results ==
The following table gives the election results:

1871 Roslyn by-election
Party	Candidate	Votes	%	±%
Independent	Edward McGlashan	240	54.67	
Independent	William Cutten	147	33.49	
Independent	John Cargill	52	11.85	
Independent	John Graham	13	2.96	
Independent	James McIndoe	6	1.37	
Majority		93	21.18	
Turnout		439		
