= Pareora (electorate) =

Pareora was a former parliamentary electorate in the Canterbury region of New Zealand for one electoral term in the 19th century.

== Population centres ==
In the 1892 electoral redistribution, population shift to the North Island required the transfer of one seat from the South Island to the north. The resulting ripple effect saw every electorate established in 1890 have its boundaries altered, and eight electorates were established for the first time, including Pareora.

== History ==
Pareora existed from 1893 to 1896, when it temporarily replaced the Geraldine electorate.

The electorate was represented by one Member of Parliament, Frederick Flatman for that period. He defeated the former Geraldine MP Arthur Rhodes for the electorate in the 28 November 1893 general election by 1594 to 1377 votes. Flatman served until the end of the parliamentary term in 1896 and successfully contested the Geraldine electorate in that subsequent election.

== Election results ==
Key

Liberal

Election	Winner
1893 election	Frederick Flatman
