= John James Meikle =

John James Meikle (c. 1845 – 25 November 1937) was a New Zealand farmer and litigant.

He was born in Linlithgow, West Lothian, Scotland in c. 1845 and arrived in New Zealand in early 1870. On the evidence brought by a private detective who received a sizeable reward and despite a character reference by former prime minister, Sir Robert Stout, Meikle was convicted of sheep stealing and served five years in prison. After some years of collecting evidence, Meikle laid a charge of perjury against the private detective, who was sent to prison for four years. Meikle petitioned parliament for £10,000 compensation and after a lengthy debate, he was awarded £500 in 1897, which covered about 10% of his costs. Meikle continued his campaign to fully clear his name, but two Supreme Court judges assigned to the case took a dim view. Meikle died in 1937 a "bitter and broken" man. His case was "one of the most remarkable cases" in New Zealand's legal history. He was buried at Dunedin Southern Cemetery.

Meikle contested the 1901 Caversham by-election. Of six candidates, he came last with just 0.59% of the vote.
