= 5th New Zealand Parliament =

Term of the Parliament of New Zealand from 1871 to 1875

5th Parliament of New Zealand
←	4th Parliament	6th Parliament	→

Overview
- Legislative body: New Zealand Parliament
- Term: 14 August 1871 – 21 October 1875
- Election: 1871 New Zealand general election
- Government: Third Fox ministry (until 1872); Third Stafford ministry (1872); Waterhouse ministry (1872–1873); Fourth Fox ministry (1873); First Vogel ministry (1873–1875); Pollen ministry (from 1875)

House of Representatives
- Members: 78
- Speaker of the House: Dillon Bell
- Premier: Julius Vogel — 8 April 1873 – 6 July 1875; William Fox — 3 March 1873 – 8 April 1873 Edward Stafford — 10 September 1872 – 11 October 1872; William Fox — until 10 September 1872

Legislative Council
- Members: 45 (at start); 44 (at end)
- Speaker of the Council: John Richardson
- Premier: Daniel Pollen — from 6 July 1875 George Waterhouse — 11 October 1872 – 3 March 1873

Sovereign
- Monarch: HM Victoria
- Governor: HE The Marquess of Normanby — HE Rt. Hon. Sir James Fergusson from 14 June 1873 until 3 December 1874 — HE Rt. Hon Sir George Bowen until 19 March 1873

The 5th New Zealand Parliament was a term of the New Zealand Parliament. Elections for this term were held in 68 European electorates between 14 January and 23 February 1871. Elections in the four Māori electorates were held on 1 and 15 January 1871. A total of 78 MPs were elected. Parliament was prorogued in December 1875. During the term of this Parliament, six Ministries were in power.

== Sessions ==
The fifth Parliament opened on 14 August 1871, following the 1871 general election. It sat for five sessions, and was prorogued on 6 December 1875.

Session	Opened	Adjouned
first	14 August 1871	16 November 1871
second	16 July 1872	25 October 1872
third	15 July 1873	3 October 1873
fourth	3 July 1874	31 August 1874
fifth	20 July 1875	21 October 1875

== Historical context ==
Political parties had not been established yet; this only happened after the 1890 election. Anyone attempting to form an administration thus had to win support directly from individual MPs. This made first forming, and then retaining a government difficult and challenging.

== Ministries ==
Since June 1869, the third Fox Ministry was in power, led by Premier William Fox. On 10 September 1872, the third Stafford Ministry was formed, which lasted 13 months. This was followed by the Waterhouse Ministry, from 11 October 1872 to 3 March 1873. The fourth Fox Ministry was short lived, from 3 March 1873 to 8 April 1873. The first Vogel Ministry was in power from 8 April 1873 to 6 July 1875. It was succeeded by the Pollen Ministry, which lasted into the term of the sixth Parliament.

== Initial composition of the fifth Parliament ==
78 seats were created across the electorates. 68 European electorates and 4 Māori electorates were defined by the Representation Act 1870. Six of the general electorates had two representatives, the rest were single member electorates. Hence, 78 MPs were elected.

This compares to 61 electorates used in the previous general election in 1866, and 65 electorates after the Māori electorates were created in 1867. Electorates that were first formed for the 1871 elections were East Coast, Eden, Rodney, Thames, Waikato, Waitemata, Egmont, Manawatu, Buller, Grey Valley, Christchurch East, Christchurch West, Hokitika, Totara, Dunstan, Mount Ida, Tuapeka, Waitaki, Waikaia, and Wakatipu.

Member	Electorate	Province	MP's term	Election date
Robert Rhodes	Akaroa	Canterbury	First	26 January
John Evans Brown	Ashley	Canterbury	First	17 February
Julius Vogel	Auckland East	Auckland	Third	30 January
Thomas Gillies	Auckland West	Auckland	Fourth	6 February
John Williamson	Auckland West	Auckland	Fourth	6 February
William Rolleston	Avon	Canterbury	Second	13 January
William Murray	Bruce	Otago	First	28 January
Eugene O'Conor	Buller	Canterbury	First	4 February
Richard Cantrell	Caversham	Otago	First	25 January
Henry Ingles	Cheviot	Canterbury	First	27 January
Jerningham Wakefield	Christchurch East	Canterbury	Second	18 January
Edward Richardson	Christchurch West	Canterbury	First	19 January
John Davies Ormond	Clive	Hawke's Bay	Third	26 January
James William Thomson	Clutha	Otago	First	31 January
John Karslake Karslake	Coleridge	Canterbury	First	4 February
Arthur Collins	Collingwood	Nelson	Second	16 February
William Reynolds	City of Dunedin	Otago	Third	20 January
John Bathgate	City of Dunedin	Otago	First	20 January
Thomas Luther Shepherd	Dunstan	Otago	First	7 February
William Kelly	East Coast	Auckland	First	16 February
Karaitiana Takamoana	Eastern Maori		First	1 February
Robert James Creighton	Eden	Auckland	Third	31 January
William Gisborne	Egmont	Taranaki	First	18 January
William Buckland	Franklin	Auckland	Second	23 February
Archibald Clark	Franklin	Auckland	Third	23 February
George Parker	Gladstone	Canterbury	First	7 February
Frederic Carrington	Grey and Bell	Taranaki	Second	17 January
William Henry Harrison	Grey Valley	Canterbury	Second	26 January
John Hall	Heathcote	Canterbury	Third	14 January
John White	Hokitika	Canterbury	First	25 January
William Fitzherbert	Hutt	Wellington	Fourth	16 January
William Henderson Calder	Invercargill	Southland	First	24 January
John Studholme	Kaiapoi	Canterbury	Second	27 January
Peacock, John Thomas	Town of Lyttelton	Canterbury	Second	16 January
Walter Johnston	Manawatu	Wellington	First	4 February
John Munro	Marsden	Auckland	Third	30 January
Dillon Bell	Mataura	Southland	Fourth	11 February
John McLeod	Mongonui and Bay of Islands	Auckland	First	10 February
David Monro^{a}	Motueka	Nelson	Fifth	10 February
David Mervyn	Mount Ida	Otago	Second	16 February
Donald McLean	Napier	Hawke's Bay	Second	19 January
Martin Lightband	City of Nelson	Nelson	First	6 February
Oswald Curtis	City of Nelson	Nelson	Second	6 February
Ralph Richardson	Suburbs of Nelson	Nelson	First	7 February
Thomas Kelly	New Plymouth	Taranaki	Second	28 January
William Swanson	Newton	Auckland	First	25 January
Wi Katene	Northern Maori		First	15 February
Maurice O'Rorke	Onehunga	Auckland	Third	20 February
Reader Wood	Parnell	Auckland	Third	23 January
Kenny, Courtney	Picton	Marlborough	Second	27 January
James Macandrew	Port Chalmers	Otago	Fifth	15 February
William Fox	Rangitikei	Wellington	Fourth	3 February
Lauchlan McGillivray	Riverton	Southland	Second	27 January
Harry Farnall	Rodney	Auckland	Second	13 February
Henry Driver	Roslyn	Otago	Second	30 January
William Reeves	Selwyn	Canterbury	Second	1 February
Hori Kerei Taiaroa	Southern Maori		First	13 February
Donald Reid	Taieri	Otago	Second	3 February
Charles O'Neill	Thames	Auckland	Second	9 February
Edward Stafford	Timaru	Canterbury	Fourth	20 January
George Henry Tribe	Totara	Westland	First	8 February
James Clark Brown	Tuapeka	Otago	Second	13 February
James Benn Bradshaw	Waikaia	Otago	Second	9 February
James McPherson	Waikato	Auckland	First	10 February
George McLean	Waikouaiti	Otago	First	23 January
Joseph Shephard	Waimea	Marlborough	First	13 February
Henry Bunny	Wairarapa	Wellington	Third	28 January
John Andrew	Wairarapa	Wellington	First	28 January
William Henry Eyes	Wairau	Marlborough	Third	24 January
William Steward	Waitaki	Otago	First	3 February
Thomas Henderson	Waitemata	Auckland	Fourth	8 February
Charles Edward Haughton	Wakatipu	Otago	Third	25 January
George Webster	Wallace	Otago	Second	20 February
John Bryce	Wanganui	Wellington	Second	30 January
George Hunter	City of Wellington	Wellington	First	7 February
Edward Pearce	City of Wellington	Wellington	First	7 February
Alfred Brandon	Wellington Country	Wellington	Fourth	17 January
Wiremu Parata	Western Maori		First	13 February

^{a} Unseated on petition.

== Changes during term ==
There were numerous changes during the term of the fifth Parliament.

By-election	Electorate	Date	Incumbent	Reason	Winner
1871	City of Auckland West	1 September	John Williamson	Election Invalid	John Williamson
1871	Roslyn	12 September	Henry Driver	Resignation	Edward McGlashan
1872	Wairau	19 February	William Henry Eyes	Resignation	Arthur Seymour
1872	Waikato	1 March	James McPherson	Resignation	William Jackson
1872	Wakatipu	13 March	Charles Edward Haughton	Resignation	Bendix Hallenstein
1872	Rodney	16 March	Harry Farnall	Resignation	John Sheehan
1872	City of Nelson	27 May	Martin Lightband	Resignation	David Luckie
1872	Waikouaiti	12 June	George McLean	Resignation	David Monro
1872	Coleridge	23 July	John Karslake	Resignation	William Bluett
1872	Heathcote	30 July	John Hall	Resignation	John Wilson
1872	Caversham	28 August	Richard Cantrell	Resignation	William Tolmie
1872	Egmont	3 October	William Gisborne	Resignation	Harry Atkinson
1873	Suburbs of Nelson	14 May	Ralph Richardson	Resignation	Andrew Richmond
1873	Lyttelton	19 May	John Peacock	Resignation	Henry Webb
1873	Invercargill	22 May	William Henderson Calder	Resignation	John Cuthbertson
1873	Waikouaiti	23 July	David Monro	Resignation	John Lillie Gillies
1873	Mongonui and Bay of Islands	24 July	John McLeod	Resignation	John Williams
1873	Wakatipu	19 August	Bendix Hallenstein	Resignation	Vincent Pyke
1873	Collingwood	9 December	Arthur Collins	Resignation	William Gibbs
1874	Franklin	9 April	Archibald Clark	Resignation	Joseph May
1874 (1st)	Akaroa	20 April	Robert Rhodes	Resignation	William Montgomery
1874	City of Dunedin	23 April	John Bathgate	Resignation	Nathaniel Wales
1874	Waitemata	3 August	Thomas Henderson	Resignation	Gustav von der Heyde
1874 (2nd)	Akaroa	10 August	William Montgomery	Election invalid	William Montgomery
1874	Waitemata	16 September	Gustav von der Heyde	unseated on petition	Gustav von der Heyde
1875	Kaiapoi	22 January	John Studholme	Resignation	Charles Bowen
1875 (1st)	City of Auckland West	27 March	Thomas Gillies	Appointed to Supreme Court	George Grey
1875 (2nd)	City of Auckland West	14 April	John Williamson	Death	Patrick Dignan
1875	Rangitikei	24 April	William Fox	Resignation	John Ballance
1875	Waikouaiti	3 May	John Lillie Gillies	Resignation	George McLean
1875	Wairau	21 June	Arthur Seymour	Resignation	Joseph Ward
1875	Wallace	6 August	George Webster	Death	Christopher Basstian
1875	Caversham	20 August	William Tolmie	Death	Robert Stout

Akaroa

Robert Heaton Rhodes resigned on 18 February 1874. William Montgomery won the subsequent 24 April 1874 by-election. In July 1874, a select committee declared Montgomery's election to be "null and void", as he had a contract for the supply of railway sleepers with the general government in breach of election rules. The select committee accepted that the breach was inadvertent. Montgomery stood for re-election in a 10 August 1874 by-election and was returned unopposed.

Caversham

Richard Cantrell resigned on 31 July 1872. He was succeeded by William Tolmie in a 28 August 1872 by-election, and he served until his death on 8 August 1875. Robert Stout, a later Prime Minister, first entered Parliament through the resulting 20 August 1875 by-election.

Coleridge

John Karslake Karslake resigned on 12 April 1872 to return to England (he drowned on the voyage home on 21 June 1872). William Bluett succeeded him through the 22 July 1872 by-election.

Collingwood

Arthur Collins resigned on 8 October 1873. The resulting 9 December 1873 by-election was won by William Gibbs.

City of Dunedin

Bathgate resigned in 1874 and was succeeded by Nathaniel Wales.

City of Nelson

Lightband resigned in 1872 to return to England. He was succeeded by David Luckie.

Egmont

Gisborne resigned in 1872 and was succeeded by Harry Atkinson.

Franklin

Clark resigned in 1874 and was succeeded by Joseph May.
