= 1871 City of Auckland West by-election =

New Zealand by-election

The 1871 City of Auckland West by-election was a by-election held on 1 September 1871 in the City of Auckland West electorate during the 5th New Zealand Parliament. It was then a two-member electorate.

The by-election was caused by the resignation of the incumbent, John Williamson. His earlier election had been declared invalid, as he held the position of Commissioner of Crown Lands.

John Williamson was re-elected unopposed.
