= Robert Stout Law Library =

Law library at University of Otago

Coordinates: 45.86593°S 170.51352°E

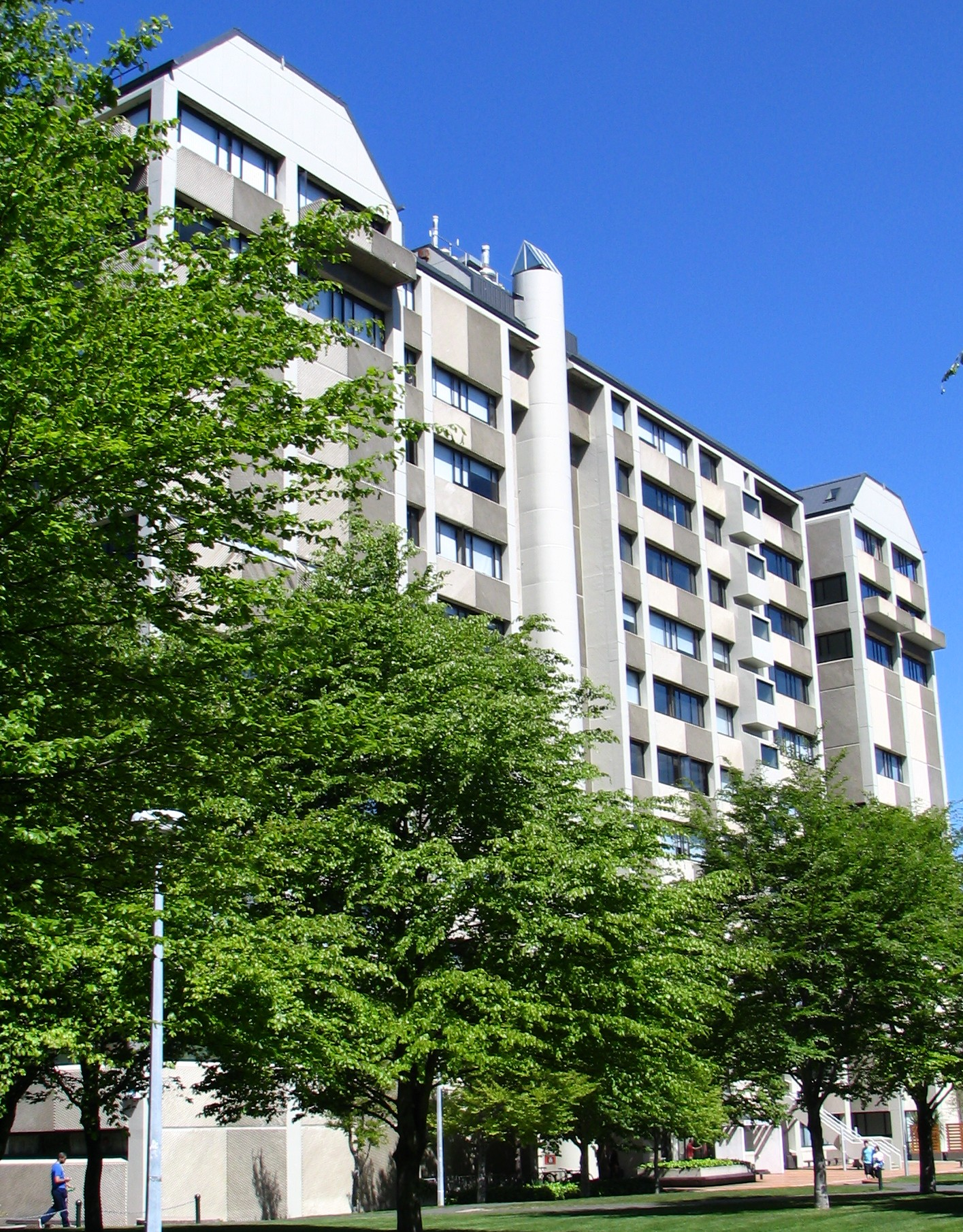
Richardson Building in 2008

The Robert Stout Law Library is the law library of the University of Otago in the city of Dunedin in New Zealand. It is named in honour of Sir Robert Stout, the first lecturer in law at Otago (1873–1876). Following his time at Otago, Stout went on to serve as Attorney-General, Premier, and Chief Justice of New Zealand.

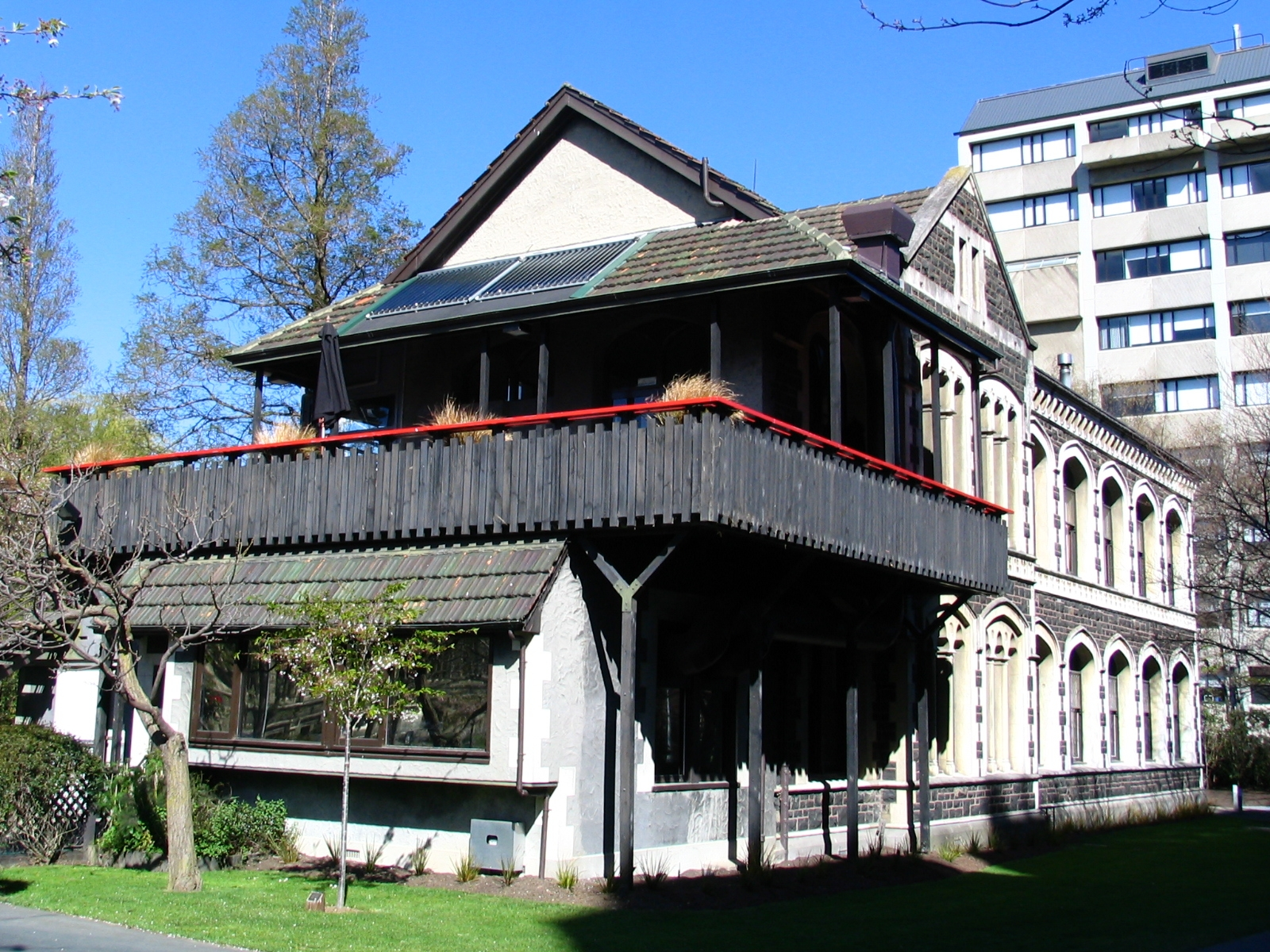
Old law library building, now Staff Club, in 2009

The Law Library is currently located in the Richardson Building in Otago's main campus in Dunedin. It occupies four floors of the Richardson Building, with 275 reader spaces. In the 1970s the library moved to the Richardson Building from the adjacent historic building which now houses the university's Staff Club.

The Law Library currently houses over 66,000 volumes of legal material, including primary sources from New Zealand, Australia, the United Kingdom, Canada. It also subscribes to the major legal journals and databases.
