= 1872 Rodney by-election =

New Zealand by-election

The 1872 Rodney by-election was a by-election held on 16 March 1872 in the Rodney electorate in the Auckland region of New Zealand during the 5th New Zealand Parliament.

The by-election was caused by the resignation of the incumbent MP Harry Farnall on 17 January 1872.

The by-election was won by John Sheehan. He was unopposed.
