= Patrick Hally =

Patrick Hally (1866 – 21 July 1938) was a Catholic bootmaker turned politician in Dunedin at the turn of the twentieth century. He was one of the three original conciliation commissioners appointed under the Industrial Conciliation and Arbitration Act in 1909.

== Early life ==
Hally was born in 1866 in Dunedin, the eldest son of John Hally. He was educated locally at the Christian Brothers' School before leaving to start an apprenticeship in the boot making trade. In 1891 he established his own shoemaking business in George Street, Dunedin.

== Political career ==
Hally was involved in local politics much of his life. He was a Labour movement sympathiser, and in 1899 became the president of the New Zealand Federal Tailoresses' Union and later was a Dunedin City Councillor, elected to represent the Bell Ward in 1902. He was a prominent member of the union-based Workers' Political Committee, an Otago-based organisation tasked with choosing political candidates to represent workers politically. Hally was also a member of the Dunedin Catholic Literary Society.

In 1901 Hally contested the Caversham by-election under a Labour banner. In a six-way contest he came third with a respectable 1,120 votes (nearly a quarter of the total vote) losing to the Liberal Party's candidate Thomas Sidey.

Hally was one of the three original conciliation commissioners appointed under the Industrial Conciliation and Arbitration Act introduced in 1908. He was appointed in 1909 and served alongside T. Harle Giles and James Richard Triggs. Hally was a commissioner until 1916, and again from 1922 until 13 September 1936.

== Family and death ==
Hally's first wife died in 1907. He married a second time. He lost a son in World War I. In 1936, Hally retired for health reasons. After having been ill for several weeks, he died in Auckland on 21 July 1938. He was survived by his wife and two sons.
