= 1875 Caversham by-election =

New Zealand by-election

- 20 August 1875
- Turnout: 443
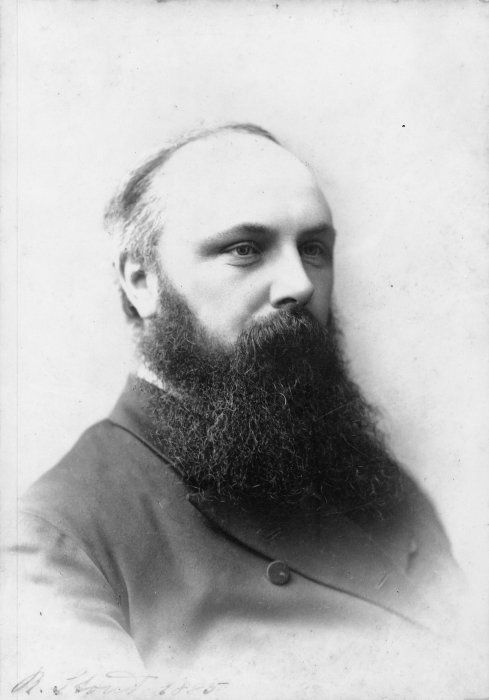

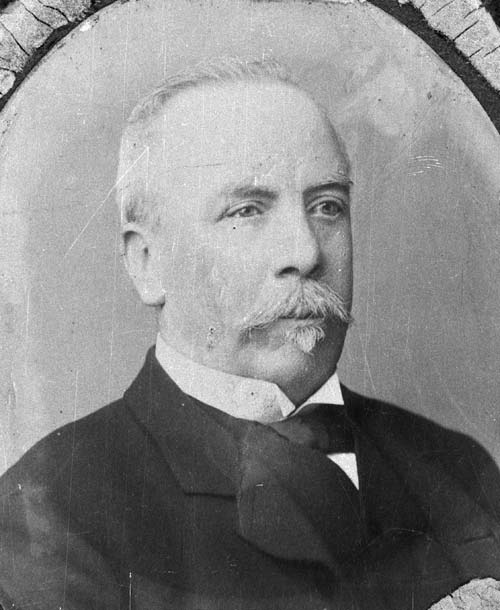
Candidate	Robert Stout	William Larnach
Party	Independent	Independent
Popular vote	232	211
Member before election
William Tolmie
Independent
Elected Member
Robert Stout
Independent

The 1875 Caversham by-election was a by-election held on 20 August 1875 during the 5th New Zealand Parliament in the Caversham electorate in the south-east of the South Island.

The by-election was held because of the death of sitting member of parliament William Tolmie.

The election saw Robert Stout narrowly win the seat by just twenty-one votes over his sole opponent, William Larnach. Both were new to the political arena with neither having stood for Parliament before.

== Results ==
The following table gives the election results:

1875 Caversham by-election
Party	Candidate	Votes	%	±%
Independent	Robert Stout	232	52.37	
Independent	William Larnach	211	47.63	
Majority		11	4.74	
Turnout		443		

The results by polling booth were as follows:

Polling booth	Stout	Larnach
Anderson's Bay	35	58
Caversham	116	104
Green Island	47	24
North Harbour	11	1
Portobello	23	34
Total:	232	211
