= William Cutten =

New Zealand politician

New Zealand Parliament
Years	Term	Electorate	Party
1853–1855	1st	Dunedin Country	Independent
1878–1879	6th	Taieri	Independent

William Henry Cutten (10 April 1822 – 30 June 1883) was a New Zealand politician from the Otago region.

== Biography ==
Cutten was born in London in 1822. He received a good education and then studied law, which earned him a job at the department of the commissioner of bankruptcy. At age 26, Cutten emigrated to New Zealand in 1848, arriving in Dunedin with the first settlers, including William Cargill on the John Wickliffe. Two years later, in 1850, he married Cargill's eldest daughter, Christina Dorothea Cargill, and the couple had 11 children.

Initially in the new settlement he was an auctioneer and storekeeper, but then became an immigration agent before being appointed a lands claim commissioner and, later, chief commissioner of Crown lands.

Cutten served in the 1st New Zealand Parliament as representative for the Dunedin Country electorate 1853–1855, but resigned before the end of his term, as he found it unsustainable to spend that much time at parliament in Auckland away from his business.

He was one of four candidates in the 1870 Caversham by-election, one of two candidates in the 1872 Caversham by-election; and came second both times. He was one of five candidates in the 1871 Roslyn by-election and came second.

He served in the 6th Parliament as a representative for Taieri from an 1878 by-election until the end of the parliamentary term in 1879, when he retired. In the 1881 election, he contested the Peninsula and, of the four candidates, he came a close second against James Seaton.

He served on the Otago Provincial Council representing the Town of Dunedin electorate. He was a member of the first, second, third and sixth council, from 1853 to 1863, and from 1871 to 1873. He was on the Council's Executive for four periods between 1854 and 1872.

He was the first editor of the Otago Witness newspaper in 1851, and in 1861 he founded the Otago Daily Times with Julius Vogel.

He died at his home in the Dunedin suburb of Anderson Bay in 1883, and was buried in the Dunedin Northern Cemetery.

== Notes ==
New Zealand Parliament
New constituency	Member of Parliament for Dunedin Country; 1853–1855; Served alongside: John Cargill	Succeeded by William Cargill
Preceded by Donald Reid	Member of Parliament for Taieri; 1878–1879	Succeeded by James Fulton
