= 1891 New Zealand census =

Eleventh census of the Colony of New Zealand
- 5 April 1891; 135 years ago

General information
- Country: New Zealand

Results
- Total population: 626,658 (▲8.33 %)
- Most populous provincial district: Otago (153,097)
- Least populous provincial district: Marlborough (12,767)

The 1891 New Zealand census was a population census of the non-Māori population taken on 5 April 1891. A separate census of Māori was taken in February 1891. The population (excluding Māori but including Chinese and "half-castes" living as Europeans) was 626,658, an 8.33% increase since the previous census in 1886. The Māori population was estimated to be 41,993, which included 2681 part-Māori living in tribes and 40 Moriori at the Chatham Islands. Another 2,184 part-Māori were living as Europeans and counted in the main census.

== Process ==
The 1891 New Zealand census took place on 5 April 1891, the same day as the censuses in the United Kingdom, other colonies and India. This was the first time that a census had been taken at the same time "over the whole of the British world".

An Act of Parliament authorised the taking of a census in New Zealand, and the government divided the whole country into 23 districts of approximately equal size. Enumerators in each district divided their district into sub-districts and appointed around 660 sub-enumerators who were familiar with their local areas. The questions on the census form had been approved at a conference of statisticians in Hobart, Australia in 1890. Separate summaries and tables were created to show the operations of churches, land, institutions and industries. Electric tabulators had been used in a recent census in the United States, but the New Zealand government chose not to use the new invention until it had been extensively tested. Instead, a system of cards was used to compile and sort census data.

The completed census for both Māori and non-Māori was submitted to Parliament on 5 December 1892.

== Non-Māori population ==
Provincial District	Population	Percent (%) change since 1886	Largest borough in each district	Borough population	Borough and suburbs population
Auckland	133,259	+ 2.13 %	Auckland	28,613	51,287
Taranaki	22,065	+ 22.59 %	New Plymouth	3,350	
Wellington	97,725	+ 26.04 %	Wellington	31,021	33,324
Hawke's Bay	28,506	+16.03 %	Napier	8,341	
Marlborough	12,767	+ 14.88 %	Blenheim	3,294	
Nelson	34,770	+ 15.12 %	Nelson	6,626	
Westland	15,887	– 0.28 %	Greymouth	3,787	
Canterbury	128,392	+ 5.76 %	Christchurch	16,223	47,846
Otago	153,097	+ 2.64 %	Dunedin	22,376	45,869
Chatham Islands	271	+36.18 %			
Kermadec Islands	19				
Total	626,658	+ 8.33 %			

== Birthplaces of the non-Māori population ==
'British allegiance' included everyone born in British possessions, naturalized British subjects and British subjects born abroad. Those who were born at sea or who had not specified a birthplace were deemed British if they had a British-sounding name. Westland had the most foreign subjects (9.57%), and Marlborough had the fewest (0.99%).

There were 4,470 people born in China, of whom only 24 were female. This was a decrease of 1.76% from the 4,550 Chinese-born people counted in 1886. 2,157 (48%) of Chinese people lived in Otago, with smaller populations in Westland (1,008), Nelson (601), Wellington (321), Auckland (170) and Canterbury (144).

Half of the Scottish-born population lived in Otago. 45.2% of Scandinavians (from Denmark, Sweden and Norway) lived in Wellington Province, and another 24.86% lived in Hawke's Bay.

Birthplace	Number	Percent (%) of population
British possessions:
New Zealand	366,716	58.61
Australian colonies	15,943	2.55
England	117,070	18.71
Wales	2,214	0.35
Scotland	51,916	8.3
Ireland	47,634	7.61
Other British possessions	3,703	0.59
Foreign countries:
Germany	4,663	0.75
Denmark and possessions	2,053	0.33
Sweden	1,414	0.23
Norway	1,288	0.21
France and possessions	711	0.11
Austria	564	0.09
Italy	397	0.06
Switzerland	362	0.06
Russia and possessions	320	0.05
Portugal and possessions	205	0.03
Holland and possessions	143	0.02
Poland	99	0.02
Greece	94	0.02
Belgium	115	0.02
Spain and possessions	76	0.01
Other European countries	34	0.01
China	4,470	0.71
America, North America (as stated)	1,016	0.16
United States of America	667	0.11
Africa	183	0.03
Other foreign countries	276	0.04
At sea	1,295	0.21
Unspecified	1,017	
Total	626,658	100
Allegiance:
British subjects	612,064	97.67
Foreign subjects	14,594	2.33
Total	626,658	100

== Occupations ==
The non-Māori census asked what occupations the population followed, with categories changed somewhat from the previous census. The most common occupations for men were those related to farming, market gardening and labouring on farms, fishing and mining (87,860). The most common occupations for women were domestic roles (19,391), and dressmaking and millinery (10,739). 1,402 girls aged between 5 and 15 years old were in paid domestic work. There were 1,644 male teachers and 2,617 female teachers, plus 524 governesses and tutors. Five male and three female phrenologists and a handful of medical electricians and galvanists were working in New Zealand.

Most Chinese were involved in gold mining, with the next most common occupation being market gardening. Sixty percent of the population was described as "dependents". This category included wives and widows without an occupation; children at home or in orphanages or industrial schools; visitors; parents depending on adult children; patients in hospitals and asylums; and prisoners.

Class	Order	Occupations	Total	Males	Females
I. Professional	1	Persons engaged in Government (not otherwise classed), defence, law, and protection	3,047	3,027	20
I. Professional	2	Persons ministering to religion, charity, health, science, education, and art	12,774	7,055	5,719
II. Domestic	3	Persons engaged in the supply of board and lodging, and in rendering personal service for which remuneration is usually paid	24,928	5,537	19,391
III. Commercial (not including manufacturers, who are included in class IV)	4	Persons performing offices in connection with the exchange, variation, insurance, lease, loan, or custody of money, houses, land, or property rights	3,756	3,414	342
III. Commercial (not including manufacturers, who are included in class IV)	5	Persons dealing in art or mechanic productions in which matters of various kinds are employed in combination	1,504	1,321	183
III. Commercial (not including manufacturers, who are included in class IV)	6	Persons engaged in the sale, hire, or exchange of textile fabrics and dress and of fibrous materials	3,144	2,634	510
III. Commercial (not including manufacturers, who are included in class IV)	7	Persons engaged in dealing in food, drinks, narcotics, and stimulants	7,035	6,478	557
III. Commercial (not including manufacturers, who are included in class IV)	8	Persons engaged in dealing in and treating animals, and dealing in animal and vegetable substances (excluding dealers in food)	1,287	1,282	5
III. Commercial (not including manufacturers, who are included in class IV)	9	Persons engaged in dealing in minerals and other materials mainly used for fuel and light	397	391	6
III. Commercial (not including manufacturers, who are included in class IV)	10	Persons engaged in dealing in minerals other than for fuel	846	838	8
III. Commercial (not including manufacturers, who are included in class IV)	11	Persons engaged as general dealers, or in undefined mercantile pursuits	8,779	7,669	1,110
III. Commercial (not including manufacturers, who are included in class IV)	12	Persons engaged in storage	1,035	1,034	1
III. Commercial (not including manufacturers, who are included in class IV)	13	Persons engaged in the transport of passengers, goods, or communications	15,413	15,269	144
IV. Industrial	14	Persons engaged in connection with the manufacture or other processes relating to, art and mechanic productions in which materials of various kinds are employed in combination	9,672	9,379	293
IV. Industrial	15	Persons engaged in connection with the manufacture, repairs, cleansing, or in other processes relating to textile fabrics, dress and fibrous materials	19,437	8,698	10,739
IV. Industrial	16	Persons engaged in connection with the manufacture of, or in other processes relating to, food, drink, narcotics, and stimulants	4,453	4,299	154
IV. Industrial	17	Persons (not otherwise classed) engaged in manufacture or other processes connected with animal and vegetable substances	3,563	3,523	40
IV. Industrial	18	Persons engaged in the alteration, modification, manufacture, or other processes relating to, metals or mineral matters	5,768	5,742	26
IV. Industrial	19	Persons engaged in the making or repairing of buildings, roads, railways, docks, earthworks, etc., in the disposal of silt, dead matter, or refuse, or in mechanical operations or labour the nature of which is undefined	12,679	12,667	12
IV. Industrial	20	Industrial workers imperfectly defined	14,949	14,888	61
V. Agricultural, pastoral, mineral, and other primary producers	21	Persons directly engaged in the cultivation of land, or in rearing or breeding animals, or in obtaining raw products from natural sources	90,546	87,860	2,686
VI. Indefinite occupations	22	Persons whose occupations are undefined or unknown, embracing those who derive incomes from sources which cannot be directly related to any other class	7,751	4,341	3,410
VII. Dependents	23	Persons dependent upon natural guardians [includes children]	369,178	122,410	246,768
VII. Dependents	24	Persons dependent upon the State, or upon public or private support	4,717	3,121	1,596
		Total population	626,658	332,877	293,781

== Māori census ==
The Māori census was held during February 1891. The total Māori population, not including part-Māori living as Europeans, was estimated to be 41,993. This was almost the same population as shown by the previous census in 1886. Almost all Māori lived in the North Island.

Māori census information was collected by officials who visited each settlement and spoke to the people there, rather than having them fill in forms. The Māori population was very mobile, which led to difficulties making accurate counts. For example, a large number of the usual residents of Rotorua were away from home working on a railway contract at census time, and in Northland there were about 150 people from other areas who had arrived to dig gum for a short time. In some locations, Māori refused to give information to the enumerator. From Otorohanga, Native Agent George Wilkinson wrote:

[...] the work of taking the Maori census through parts of my district has again been a difficult one, principally caused, as usual, by the King Natives or supporters of Tawhiao, wherever they were situated—with here and there an exception—refusing to give any particulars or information whatsoever to the sub-enumerators either as regards themselves, their cultivations, or their live stock. The returns so far as they are concerned have been obtained with great difficulty, and in some few cases are conjectural; but, in the case of Kingite settlements, I took the precaution to select as subenumerators either Natives, half-castes, or Europeans who were best qualified to get all the information obtainable.

As enumerators filed their reports with the government, they commented on the living conditions, local epidemics, housing and farming in Māori communities. In some areas, it was stated that poor living conditions in swampy localities were causing respiratory diseases. There was difficulty counting livestock as many animals were held communally with no clear ownership.

North Island: by principal tribes	1886	Population 1891
Arawa	3,184	3,713
Muaupoko	91	89
Ngatiporou	3,287	3,695
Ngatikahungunu	5,175	5,194
Ngaiterangi	992	1,316
Ngapuhi	5,549	6,314
Ngatimaniapoto	1,685	1,531
Ngatimaru	1,580	1,349
Ngatiawa	2,067	2,027
Ngatiraukawa	2,192	1,599
Ngatiruanui	1,065	835
Ngatiwhatua	596	471
Rangitane	105	98
Rarawa	2,034	2,023
Taranaki	947	609
Urewera	1,901	1,211
Waikato	4,000	3,923
Whanau-a-Apanui	617	696
Whakatohea	845	546
Whanganui	1,440	1,747
Unspecified	175	443
Others		106
Total North Island	39,527	39,535
South Island: by county		
Sounds	185	208
Marlborough	87	69
Kaikoura	62	69
Collingwood	25	29
D'Urville Island	38	34
Waimea	95	100
Buller	29	33
Grey	3	
Westland	68	86
Amuri	1	
Cheviot	1	2
Ashley	173	158
Selwyn	118	42
Akaroa	197	255
Geraldine	107	94
Waimate	52	75
Waitaki	139	152
Waikouaiti	173	155
Peninsula	54	22
Taieri	47	68
Clutha	31	30
Maniototo	6	
Lake	2	
Southland	7	3
Wallace	195	199
Total South Island	1,864	1,883
Stewart Island	151	136
Chatham Islands	159	148
Chatham Islands: Moriori	36	40
Māori wives living with European husbands	201	251
Grand total	41,969	41,993
