= 1872 Egmont by-election =

New Zealand by-election

The 1872 Egmont by-election was a by-election held on 3 October 1872 during the 5th New Zealand Parliament in the Taranaki electorate of Egmont.

The by-election was caused by the resignation of the incumbent MP William Gisborne, who had been appointed Commissioner for the Government Life Insurance Office.

The by-election was won by future Premier Harry Atkinson, who was returning to politics to defeat a candidate allied with William Fox; saying he would "not see a Foxite get in". He also opposed Julius Vogel, also a supporter of Māori land rights, for his reckless borrowing (see The Vogel Era).

Atkinson was opposed by William Sefton Moorhouse, a personal friend of Fox and supporter of Vogel's Public Works policy. Atkinson and Ballance both supported Edward Stafford.

Future Premier John Ballance had considered entering national politics by standing here but withdrew. Ballance's campaign lasted ten days, starting with a meeting at Patea on 18 September when he spoke for over three hours, a wonderfully good speech. Atkinson was present at his Hawera meeting. So Ballance decided to withdraw in favour of Atkinson as Atkinson and Moorhouse were much more experienced candidates. He had the excuse that "about 80" freeholders in Patea had been rejected from enrolling (later found to be 58 rejections as against 15 in 1871, probably from mistakes in proving their entitlement as landowners). Atkinson won with a slim margin of 24 votes and his vote in Patea (46 to 17) was critical.

== Results ==
1872 Egmont by-election
Party	Candidate	Votes	%	±%
Independent	Harry Atkinson	114	55.88	
Independent	William Sefton Moorhouse	90	44.12	
Turnout		204		
Majority		24	1.76	
