= 1870 Caversham by-election =

New Zealand by-election

The 1870 Caversham by-election was a by-election held on 25 April 1870 in the Caversham electorate in the Otago region of New Zealand during the 4th New Zealand Parliament.

The by-election was caused by the resignation of the incumbent Arthur John Burns, on 25 March 1870.

The by-election was won by James McIndoe. He was opposed by: William Cutten, John Graham and William Robertson.

== Results ==
1870 Caversham by-election
Party	Candidate	Votes	%	±%
Independent	James McIndoe	146	62.66	
Independent	William Cutten	71	30.47	
Independent	John Graham	16	6.87	
Independent	William Robertson	9	3.86	
Turnout		349		
Majority		39	11.17	
