= William Barron (politician) =

New Zealand politician

New Zealand Parliament
Years	Term	Electorate	Party
1879–1881	7th	Caversham	Independent
1881–1884	8th	Caversham	Independent
1884–1887	9th	Caversham	Independent
1887–1890	10th	Caversham	Independent

William Barron (1837 – 16 June 1916) was a 19th-century Member of Parliament from Dunedin, New Zealand.

Born in St Andrews, Scotland in 1837, Barron arrived in New Zealand in 1851. He first spent time as a miner and merchant on the Otago goldfields before engaging in business in Dunedin. He served as Grand Master of the New Zealand Lodge of Freemasons.

He represented the Caversham electorate from 1879 to 1890, when he retired.

New Zealand Parliament
Preceded by James Seaton	Member of Parliament for Caversham; 1879–1890	Vacant Constituency abolished, recreated in 1893 Title next held by Arthur Morrison
