= James McIndoe =

New Zealand politician

New Zealand Parliament
| Years | Term | Electorate | Party |
|---|---|---|---|
| 1870 | 4th | Caversham | Independent |

James McIndoe (1824 – 4 September 1905) was a 19th-century Member of Parliament from Dunedin, New Zealand.

Born in Rothesay, Bute, Scotland, McIndoe emigrated to Otago in New Zealand in 1859. He was elected as a member of the Otago Provincial Council in 1867.

McIndoe represented the Caversham electorate from 25 April to 30 December, 1870 but was not re-elected as a candidate in the 1871 Roslyn by-election.

He was married to Elizabeth Gillies, and had three children, among them the printer John McIndoe. Elizabeth's siblings Thomas, Robert, and John Lillie Gillies also migrated to Dunedin.

McIndoe took an interest in local history, publishing A Sketch of Otago in 1878. His newspaper submissions often appeared under the initials "I.M.I." He died in Dunedin on 4 September 1905, and was buried at Andersons Bay Cemetery.

New Zealand Parliament
| Preceded by Arthur John Burns | Member of Parliament for Caversham; 1870 | Succeeded by Richard Cantrell |
