= James Seaton (New Zealand politician) =

Member of the New Zealand Parliament

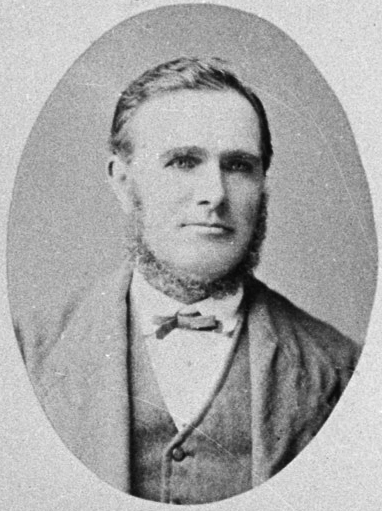

Member of the New Zealand Parliament for Caversham
- In office 1875–1879
- Preceded by: Robert Stout
- Succeeded by: William Barron

Member of the New Zealand Parliament for Peninsula
- In office 1881–1882
- Succeeded by: William Larnach
- Majority: 12 (1.4%)

Personal details
- Born: May 1822 Sorn, East Ayrshire, Scotland
- Died: 18 November 1882 (aged 60)
- Party: Independent politician
- Spouse: Marion Thomson
- Profession: Machinist

James Seaton (May 1822 – 18 November 1882) was a 19th-century member of Parliament from Dunedin, New Zealand.

Seaton was born in Sorn, East Ayrshire, Scotland, and was one of the original settlers of Otago. He arrived on board the Philip Laing in 1848.

New Zealand Parliament
Years	Term	Electorate	Party
1875–1879	6th	Caversham	Independent
1881–1882	8th	Peninsula	Independent

He represented the Caversham electorate from 1875 to 1879, when he retired. He then represented the Peninsula electorate from 1881 to 1882, when he died in a horse and buggy accident.

New Zealand Parliament
Preceded by Robert Stout	Member of Parliament for Caversham; 1875–1879	Succeeded by William Barron
New constituency	Member of Parliament for Peninsula; 1881–1882	Succeeded by William Larnach
