= Thomas Sidey =

New Zealand politician (1863–1933)

The Honourable Sir Thomas Sidey
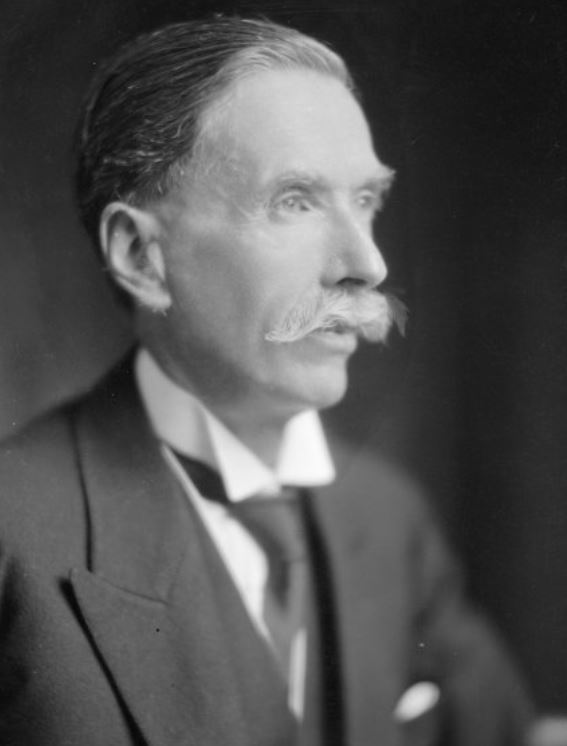
- Sidey in 1931

15th Attorney-General of New Zealand
- In office 10 December 1928 – 22 September 1931
- Preceded by: Frank Rolleston
- Succeeded by: William Downie Stewart Jr

28th Minister of Justice of New Zealand
- In office 18 December 1929 – 28 May 1930
- Preceded by: Thomas Wilford
- Succeeded by: John Cobbe

Personal details
- Born: Thomas Kay Sidey; 27 May 1863 Dunedin, New Zealand
- Died: 20 May 1933 (aged 69) Dunedin, New Zealand
- Party: Liberal (1901–28); United (1928–33)
- Spouse: Helena Baxter
- Children: 1
- Relatives: Stuart Sidey (son)

Sir Thomas Kay Sidey (27 May 1863 – 20 May 1933) was a New Zealand politician from the Otago region, remembered for his successful advocacy of daylight saving time.

== Early life ==
Sidey was born on 27 May 1863, to John and Johan Murray Sidey, in the Dunedin suburb of Corstorphine. His father had come to wealth during the Otago gold rush as a storekeeper. Tom Sidey attended Otago Boys' High School and graduated from the University of Otago with a law degree (LLB) in 1889. In the following decade, he worked as a solicitor.

He married Helena (née Baxter) on 17 June 1903. They had one son.

== Political career ==
New Zealand Parliament
Years	Term	Electorate	Party
1901–02	14th	Caversham	Liberal
1902–05	15th	Caversham	Liberal
1905–08	16th	Caversham	Liberal
1908–11	17th	Dunedin South	Liberal
1911–14	18th	Dunedin South	Liberal
1914–19	19th	Dunedin South	Liberal
1919–22	20th	Dunedin South	Liberal
1922–25	21st	Dunedin South	Liberal
1925–28	22nd	Dunedin South	Liberal
1928	Changed allegiance to:		United

Sidey was a member of the Caversham Borough Council. He was elected Mayor of Caversham on three occasions: in 1894, 1899 and 1901.

Sidey was elected to the House of Representatives in the Caversham by-election as an independent liberal in 1901. The by-election was caused by the death of Arthur Morrison. Sidey joined the Liberal Party as part of its left (radical) wing, and stayed with the party until the end. He represented the Caversham electorate from 1901 to 1908, and then the Dunedin South electorate from 1908 to 1928, when he retired. He was then appointed to the Legislative Council from 1928 until 1933.

In the 1920s the Liberal Party was weakened by several successive election defeats and Sidey became one of the party's most experienced MPs. He accordingly became the deputy leader of the party under Thomas Wilford. When Wilford resigned as leader, Sidey was thought to have had strong claims to the leadership. While he was respected due to his length of service in the house and believed by colleagues to have many of the required leadership characteristics, he was not regarded as particularly talented as a parliamentary debater, a deficiency that outweighed his more desirable attributes. Sidey stood for the leadership but was defeated by George Forbes, the party whip.

The Liberal Party was relaunched as the United Party just ahead of the 1928 general election, which it made enough gains to form a government. Sidey was Attorney-General (1928–31) and Minister of Justice (1930–31) in the United government. He was one of a majority of ministers who had no previous cabinet experience. Prime Minister Sir Joseph Ward resigned in 1930, Sidey was speculated again as a leadership contender, though he declined to put himself forward. When United was forced into a coalition with the Reform Party in 1931, Sidey left the ministry so it could accommodate Reform ministers into the cabinet.

Sidey put forward a private member's bill for putting clocks forward an hour in summer every year from 1909. It was nearly passed in 1915. It was passed in the House of Representatives but rejected by the Legislative Council in 1926. It was finally approved in 1927.

In the 1930 New Year Honours, Sidey was appointed a Knight Bachelor. His refusal to stand against Forbes for the Premiership is thought to have led to his receiving of a knighthood.

== Death ==
Sidey died at home on 20 May 1933. He was survived by his wife and son, Stuart Sidey. His son became Mayor of Dunedin from 1959 to 1965. His widow, Helena, Lady Sidey, was appointed an Officer of the Order of the British Empire for social welfare services, especially in connection with women's organisations, in the 1953 Coronation Honours. The Royal Society of New Zealand awards the T. K. Sidey Medal at irregular intervals for "outstanding scientific research".

== Citations ==
Political offices
Preceded by Frank Rolleston	Attorney-General; 1928–1931	Succeeded by William Downie Stewart
Preceded by Thomas Wilford	Minister of Justice; 1929–1930	Succeeded by John Cobbe
New Zealand Parliament
Preceded by Arthur Morrison	Member of Parliament for Caversham; 1901–1908	Constituency abolished
Preceded by James Arnold	Member of Parliament for Dunedin South; 1908–1928	Succeeded by William Taverner
