= James McPherson (New Zealand politician) =

New Zealand politician

New Zealand Parliament
Years	Term	Electorate	Party
1871	5th	Waikato	Independent

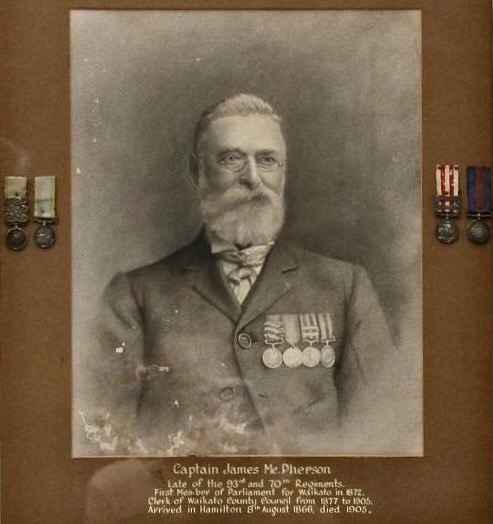
Capt. James McPherson

James McPherson (1831/1832 – 23 August 1905) was a 19th-century Member of Parliament in the Waikato region of New Zealand.

McPherson was born into a Highland family in 1831 or 1832. He arrived in New Zealand on the Calcutta in May 1861 as Ensign of the 70th Regiment with his wife and two children. Later, he was paymaster in the Commissariat Transport Corps. In July 1864, he received his commission as captain and joined the 4th Waikato Regiment.

His country grant was in the present-day suburb of Hillcrest, Hamilton, and as well as farming the land he set up a flax-dressing mill. He named his property 'Riverlea' and built a two storied house of Kauri timber in the mid-1870s.

He represented the Waikato electorate in 1871, from 10 February to 20 December, when he resigned.

Six years later he was with the Waikato County Council (appointed clerk and treasurer) and remained there until his death on 22 August 1905. He is buried in the Hamilton East Cemetery.

New Zealand Parliament
New constituency	Member of Parliament for Waikato; 1871	Succeeded by William Jackson
