= Arthur Morrison (politician) =

New Zealand politician

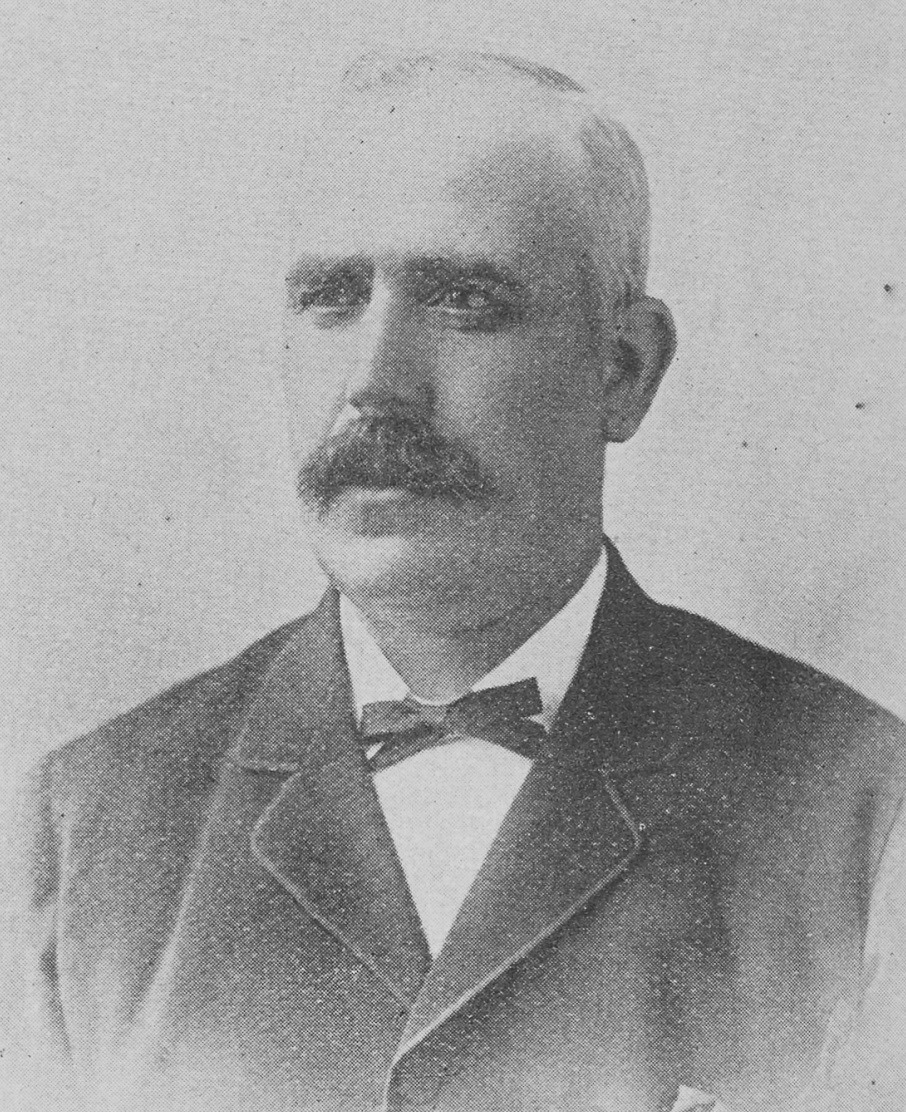
- Morrison in 1899

Member of the New Zealand Parliament for Caversham
- In office 28 November 1893 – 21 November 1901
- Preceded by: In abeyance
- Succeeded by: Thomas Sidey

Personal details
- Born: 22 November 1846 Darvel, Scotland
- Died: 21 November 1901 (aged 54) Hanmer Springs, New Zealand
- Party: Liberal
- Occupation: Coal merchant

Arthur Morrison (22 November 1846 – 21 November 1901) was a member of parliament in Dunedin, New Zealand.

== Biography ==
=== Early life ===
Morrison was born in Darvel, Ayrshire, Scotland, in 1846 and attended the local parish school until aged nine years. He emigrated to New Zealand in 1874 and was a coal merchant in Dunedin from 1875 until his election to Parliament in 1893. He exemplified the self-made man who identified with Labour, educating himself at night schools after having had to leave school at nine years old.

=== Political career ===
New Zealand Parliament
Years	Term	Electorate	Party
1893–1896	12th	Caversham	Liberal–Labour
1896–1899	13th	Caversham	Liberal–Labour
1899–1901	14th	Caversham	Liberal–Labour

Morrison served on the Caversham Borough Council for three years. The Otago Daily Times said Morrison was a "careful reasoner". He was a labour friendly Liberal and was endorsed by the Dunedin delegates of the Workers' Political Committee. He personally went out in person to support 1890 maritime strike to demonstrate his sympathy for the labouring class.

He represented the Caversham electorate in the New Zealand House of Representatives from the 1893 general election to his death in 1901. He won his seat, primarily opposed by William Barron, a former Stout-Vogelite MP who stood as an independent.

In Parliament Morrison was a strong supported of a formal party based government. From 1900 until 1901 he was the Liberal Party's junior whip.

=== Death ===
Morrison died of throat cancer in Hanmer Springs on 21 November 1901. It was the largest funeral that has ever been witnessed in Caversham.

== Citations ==
New Zealand Parliament
Vacant Constituency recreated after abolition in 1890 Title last held by William Barron	Member of Parliament for Caversham; 1893–1901	Succeeded by Thomas Sidey
