= Arthur John Burns =

New Zealand politician

Arthur John Burns (22 October 1830 – 15 September 1901) was a prominent early settler of Otago, New Zealand, a member of the Otago Provincial Council, a member of the New Zealand House of Representatives and founder of the Mosgiel Woollen Company, Dunedin.

== Biography ==
New Zealand Parliament
Years	Term	Electorate	Party
1865–1866	3rd	Bruce	Independent
1866–1870	4th	Caversham	Independent
1875–1878	6th	Roslyn	Independent

Burns was born in Monkton, South Ayrshire, Scotland. He was the only son and eldest child of Thomas Burns and Clementina Grant and the great-nephew of the poet Robert Burns. He came to Otago with his father in the Philip Laing arriving in Port Chalmers on 15 April 1848.

He played a prominent part in provincial affairs and was a member of the Provincial Council from 1855 to 1859 and again from 1863 to 1870. On three occasions, he served on the Executive Council of the Otago Province. He was also a member of the New Zealand House of Representatives on three occasions; Bruce 1865–1866, Caversham 1866–1870 when he resigned, and Roslyn 1875–1878 when he resigned. He vigorously opposed the abolition of the provinces in 1876.

On 6 April 1861 he married Sarah Scott Dickson, with whom he had 11 children.

He founded the Mosgiel Woollen Company in 1871 in an area on the western outskirts of Dunedin. Burns named the town Mosgiel after his great-uncle Robert Burns's Mossgiel farm in Ayrshire, Scotland. He imported skilled labour and specialised equipment from Great Britain to begin large scale clothmaking in 1873. This mill formed the backbone of the Mosgiel economy for decades.

Burns died on 15 September 1901 and is memorialised in the names of two schools – Arthur Burns School in Mosgiel and the Arthur Burns Early Learning Centre. Arthur Burns School in Mosgiel has since been amalgamated with two other primary schools in the region. Burns Point and Arthurs Walk in Vauxhall are named after Burns, who lived on the site of the current White House.

== Notes ==
New Zealand Parliament
Preceded by Thomas Gillies	Member of Parliament for Bruce; 1865–1866; Served alongside: Edward Cargill, James Macandrew	Succeeded by John Cargill
New constituency	Member of Parliament for Caversham; 1866–1870	Succeeded by James McIndoe
Preceded by Edward McGlashan	Member of Parliament for Roslyn; 1875–1878	Succeeded by John Bathgate
