= Robert Stout =

Premier of New Zealand (1884, 1884–1887)

The Right Honourable Sir Robert Stout KCMG
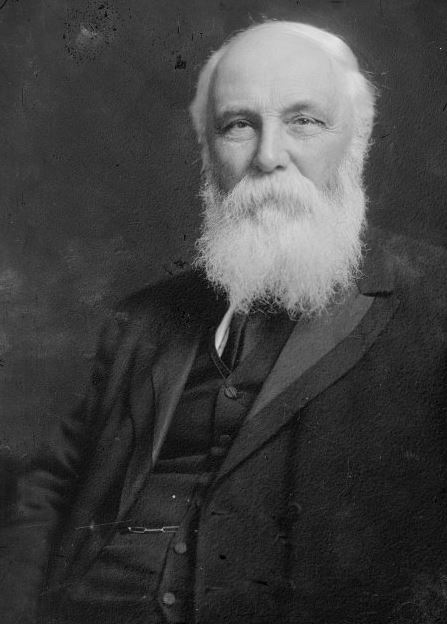
- Stout in 1914

13th Premier of New Zealand
- Monarch: Victoria
- Governor: William Jervois
- In office 16 August 1884 – 28 August 1884
- Preceded by: Harry Atkinson
- Succeeded by: Harry Atkinson
- In office 3 September 1884 – 8 October 1887
- Preceded by: Harry Atkinson
- Succeeded by: Harry Atkinson

4th Chief Justice of New Zealand
- In office 25 May 1899 – 31 January 1926
- Nominated by: Richard Seddon
- Appointed by: Earl Ranfurly
- Preceded by: James Prendergast
- Succeeded by: Charles Skerrett

Personal details
- Born: 28 September 1844 Lerwick, Shetland, Scotland, United Kingdom
- Died: 19 July 1930 (aged 85) Wellington, New Zealand
- Party: Liberal (1889–1896)
- Spouse: Anna Paterson Logan (m. 1876)
- Children: 6, including Duncan

Sir Robert Stout KCMG (28 September 1844 – 19 July 1930) was a New Zealand politician who was the 13th premier of New Zealand on two occasions in the late 19th century, and later Chief Justice of New Zealand. He was the only person to hold both these offices. He was noted for his support of liberal causes such as women's suffrage, and for his strong belief that philosophy and theory should always triumph over political expediency.

== Early life ==
Born in the town of Lerwick in Scotland's Shetland Islands, Stout retained a strong attachment to the Shetland Islands throughout his life. He received a good education, was dux at his school when he graduated in 1858 and eventually qualified as a teacher. He also qualified as a surveyor in 1860. He became highly interested in politics through his extended family, which often met to discuss and debate political issues of the day. Stout was exposed to many different political philosophies during his youth.

In 1863, Stout emigrated to Dunedin, New Zealand. Once there, he quickly became involved in political debate, which he greatly enjoyed. He also became active in the Freethought circles of the city. After failing to find employment as a surveyor on the Otago gold-fields, Stout returned to education, holding a number of senior teaching positions at the high-school level.

Eventually, however, Stout moved away from education and entered the legal profession. In 1867 he was working in the law firm of William Downie Stewart Sr (father of the William Downie Stewart Jr who later became Minister of Finance). He was called to the bar on 4 July 1871, and proved to be a highly successful trial-lawyer. He also became one of Otago University's first students (possibly the first, although this claim is disputed), studying political economy and the theory of morality. He later became the university's first law-lecturer.

== Early political career ==
New Zealand Parliament
Years	Term	Electorate	Party
1875	5th	Caversham	Independent
1875–1879	6th	City of Dunedin	Independent
1884–1887	9th	Dunedin East	Independent
1893	11th	Inangahua	Liberal
1893–1896	12th	City of Wellington	Liberal
1896–1898	13th	City of Wellington	Independent

Stout's political career started with his election to the Otago Provincial Council. During his time on the Council he impressed many people - both with his energy and with his rhetorical skill - although others found him abrasive, and complained about his lack of respect for those who held different views.

Stout successfully contested an August 1875 by-election in the Caversham electorate and thus became a Member of the New Zealand Parliament. He unsuccessfully opposed moves by the central government (Vogel) to abolish the provinces. At the 1875 election a few months later, he was returned in the City of Dunedin electorate.

On 13 March 1878, Stout became Attorney-General in the government of Premier George Grey. He had a hand in a number of significant pieces of legislation while in this role. On 25 July 1878, Stout gained the additional role of Minister of Lands and Immigration. A strong advocate of land reform, Stout worked towards the goal of state ownership of land, which would then be leased to individual farmers. He often expressed fears that private ownership would lead to the sort of "powerful landlord class" that existed in Britain. Stout also supported taxation of privately owned land, especially gains in value. Later, in 1885 he noted that he had already been an advocate of Georgist public finance policy long before Henry George wrote Progress and Poverty.

On 25 June 1879, however, Stout resigned both from cabinet and from parliament, citing the need to focus on his law practice. His partner in the practice was growing increasingly ill, and the success of his firm was important to the welfare of both Stout and his family. Throughout his career, Stout found the cost of participating in politics a serious worry. His legal career, however, was probably not the only contributing factor to his resignation, with a falling out between Stout and George Grey having occurred shortly beforehand.

At around this time Stout also developed a friendship with John Ballance, who had also resigned from Grey's cabinet after a dispute. Stout and Ballance shared many of the same political views. During his absence from parliament, Stout began to form ideas about political parties in New Zealand, believing in the need for a united liberal front. He eventually concluded, however, that parliament was too fragmented for any real political parties to be established.

In the election of 1884 Stout re-entered parliament, and attempted to rally the various liberal-leaning MPs behind him. Stout promptly formed an alliance with Julius Vogel, a former premier (1873–1875 and 1876) – this surprised many observers, because although Vogel shared Stout's progressive social views, the two had frequently clashed over economic policy and the future of the provincial governments. Many saw Vogel as the dominant partner in the alliance.

== Premier ==
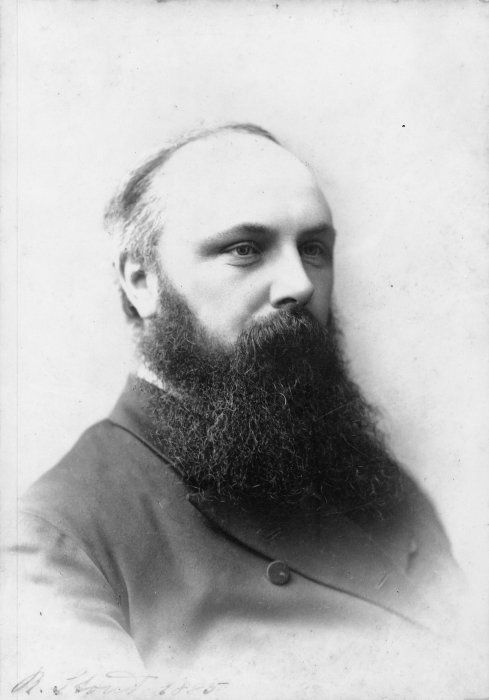
Stout in 1885.

In August 1884, only a month after returning to parliament, Stout passed a vote of no confidence in the conservative Harry Atkinson, and assumed the premiership. Julius Vogel was made treasurer, thereby gaining a considerable measure of power in the administration. Stout's new government lasted less than two weeks, however, with Atkinson managing to pass his own vote of no confidence against Stout. Atkinson himself, however, failed to establish a government, and was removed by yet another vote of no confidence. Stout and Vogel returned to power once again.

Stout's second government lasted considerably longer than his first. Its primary achievements were the reform of the civil service and a programme to increase the number of secondary schools in the country. It also organised the construction of the Midland railway line between Canterbury and the West Coast. The economy, however, did not prosper, with all attempts to pull it out of depression failing. In the 1887 election, Stout himself lost his seat in parliament to James Allen by twenty-nine votes, thereby ending his premiership. Harry Atkinson, Stout's old rival, was able to form a new government after the election.

At this point, Stout decided to leave parliamentary politics altogether, and instead focus on other avenues for promoting liberal views. In particular, he was interested in resolving the growing labour disputes of the time. He was highly active in building consensus between the growing labour movement and the world of middle-class liberalism.

== Liberal Party ==
During Stout's absence from politics, his old ally, John Ballance, had been continuing to fight in parliament. After the 1890 election, Ballance had gained enough support to topple Atkinson and take the premiership. Shortly afterwards, Ballance founded the Liberal Party, New Zealand's first real political party. Only a few years later, however, Ballance became seriously ill, and asked Stout to return to parliament and be his successor. Stout agreed, and Ballance died shortly thereafter.

Stout re-entered parliament after a winning a by-election in Inangahua on 8 June 1893. Ballance's deputy, Richard Seddon, had by this time assumed leadership of the party on the understanding that a full caucus vote would later be held. In the end, however, no vote was held. Stout, backed by those who considered Seddon too conservative, attempted to challenge this, but was ultimately unsuccessful. Many of Seddon's supporters believed that the progressive views of Ballance and Stout were too extreme for the New Zealand public.

Stout remained in the Liberal Party, but constantly voiced objections to Seddon's leadership. In addition to claiming that Seddon was betraying Ballance's original progressive ideals, Stout also claimed that Seddon was too autocratic in his style of rule. Ballance's idea of a united progressive front, Stout believed, had been subverted into nothing more than a vehicle for the conservative Seddon. Seddon defended himself against these charges by claiming that Stout was merely bitter about not gaining the leadership.

== Women's suffrage ==
One of the last major campaigns that Stout participated in was the drive to grant voting rights to women. Stout had long been a supporter of this cause, having campaigned tirelessly for his own failed bill in 1878 and Julius Vogel's failed bill in 1887. He had also been highly active in the campaign to increase property rights for women, having been particularly concerned with the right of married women to keep property independently from their husbands.

John Ballance had been a supporter of women's suffrage, although his attempts to pass a bill had been blocked by the conservative Legislative Council (the now-abolished upper house of Parliament). Seddon, however, was opposed, and many believed that the cause was now lost. However, a major initiative by suffragists led by Kate Sheppard generated considerable support for women's suffrage, and Stout believed that a bill could be passed despite Seddon's objection. A group of progressive politicians, including Stout, passed a women's suffrage bill in 1893 through both the lower and upper houses, with the upper house narrowly passing it after some members who had not been in favour changed their votes because of Seddon's attempts to "kill" the bill in the upper house.

Stout was also involved with the failing Walter Guthrie group of companies in Southland and Otago which had been supported by the Bank of New Zealand, and (according to Bourke) Seddon was prepared to conceal Stout's involvement – provided Stout left politics.

In 1898 Stout retired from politics. He had represented the seats of Caversham in the 5th parliament (1875), Dunedin East in the 6th parliament (1875–79) and in the 9th parliament (1884–87), Inangahua in the 11th parliament (1893), and the City of Wellington in the 12th and 13th parliaments (1893–98).

== Life after politics ==
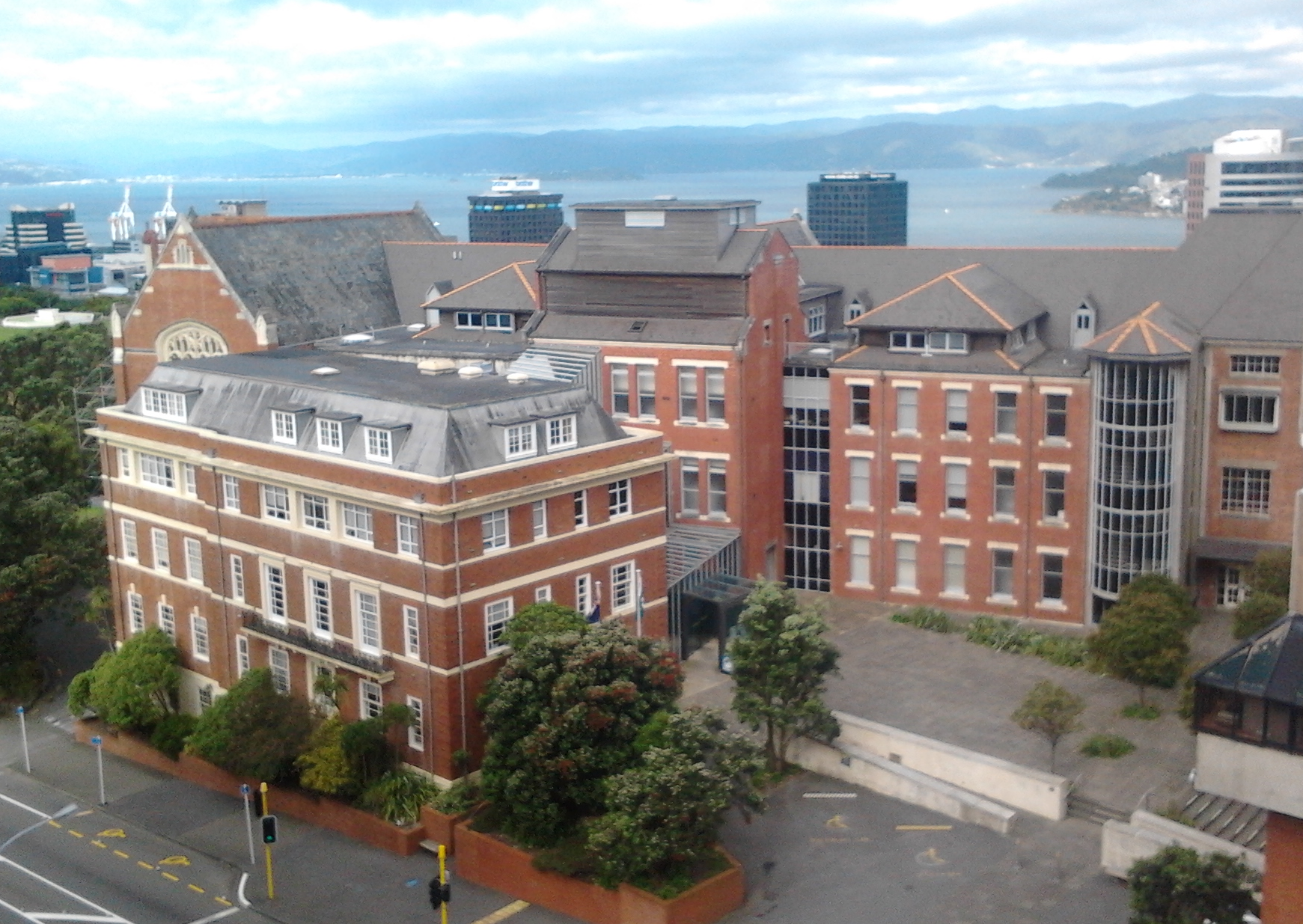
The Stout building (left), at the Kelburn campus of Victoria University of Wellington.

On 22 June 1899, he was appointed Chief Justice of New Zealand, and remained in this position until 31 January 1926. As of 2011, Stout was the last Chief Justice of New Zealand to have served in the New Zealand Parliament.

While Chief Justice, Stout showed a particular interest in the rehabilitation of criminals, contrasting with the emphasis on punishment that prevailed at the time. He took a leading part in the consolidation of New Zealand statutes (completed in 1908), and was made a member of the Privy Council of the United Kingdom in 1921. In the same year as his retirement, Stout was appointed to the Legislative Council, the last political office he would hold.

Stout also had a role of considerable importance in the development of the New Zealand university system. He had become a member of the Senate of the University of New Zealand in 1885, and remained so until 1930. From 1903 to 1923, he was the university's Chancellor. He was also prominent in Otago University from 1891 to 1898, serving on its council. He played a very significant role in the founding of what is now Victoria University of Wellington – the strong connection between Victoria University and the Stout family is remembered by the university's Stout Research Centre and its Robert Stout Building.

In 1929, Stout became increasingly ill, and never recovered. On 19 July 1930, he died in Wellington.

== Works ==
- The Rise and Progress of New Zealand historical sketch in Musings in Maoriland by Arthur T. Keirle 1890. Digitised by the New Zealand Electronic Text Centre
- Our Railway Gauge in the New Zealand Railways Magazine |volume=3 |issue=2 (1 June 1928). Digitised by the New Zealand Electronic Text Centre

== See also ==
- Robert Stout Law Library

== Notes ==
Government offices
Preceded by Harry Atkinson	Premier of New Zealand; 1884; 1884–1887	Succeeded by Harry Atkinson
Legal offices
Preceded by James Prendergast	Chief Justice of New Zealand; 1899–1926	Succeeded by Charles Skerrett
Political offices
Preceded by Frederick Whitaker	Attorney-General; 1878–1879; 1884	Succeeded by Frederick Whitaker
Preceded by Edward Conolly	Attorney-General; 1878–1879; 1884	Succeeded by Frederick Whitaker
Preceded by William Montgomery	Minister of Education; 1885–1887	Succeeded by George Fisher
New Zealand Parliament
Preceded by William Tolmie	Member of Parliament for Caversham; 1875	Succeeded by James Seaton
Preceded by Matthew Green	Member of Parliament for Dunedin East; 1884–1887	Succeeded by James Allen
Preceded by Richard Reeves	Member of Parliament for Inangahua; 1893	Succeeded by Patrick O'Regan
