= William Tolmie (politician) =

New Zealand politician

New Zealand Parliament
Years	Term	Electorate	Party
1872–1875	5th	Caversham	Independent

William Alexander Tolmie (1833 – 8 August 1875) was a 19th-century Member of Parliament from Dunedin, New Zealand.

He was born in Scotland, and represented the Caversham electorate from 1872 to 1875, when he died.

New Zealand Parliament
Preceded by Richard Cantrell	Member of Parliament for Caversham; 1872–1875	Succeeded by Robert Stout
