= 1875 Wairau by-election =

New Zealand by-election

← 1872 by-election	21 June 1875	1875–76 general →
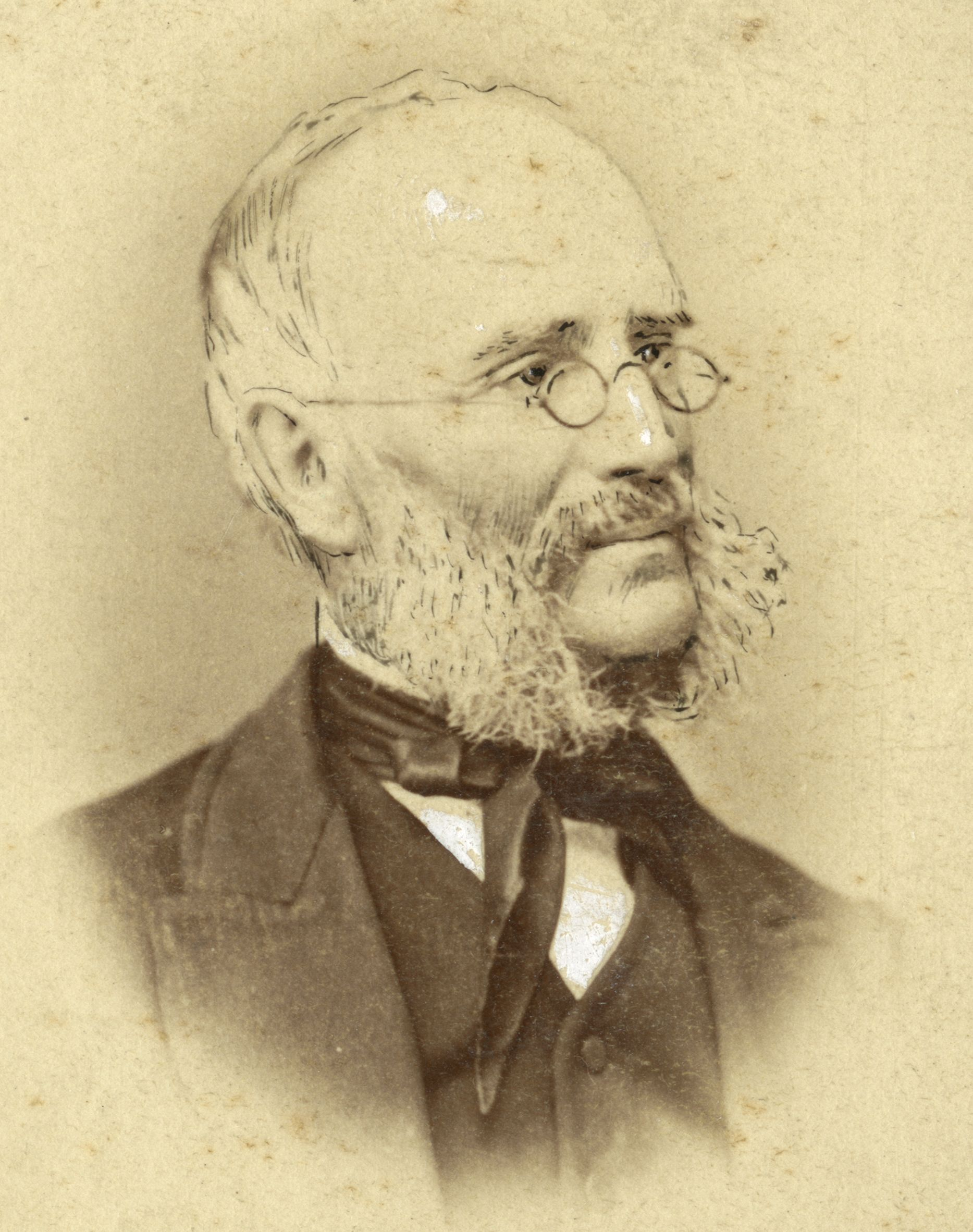

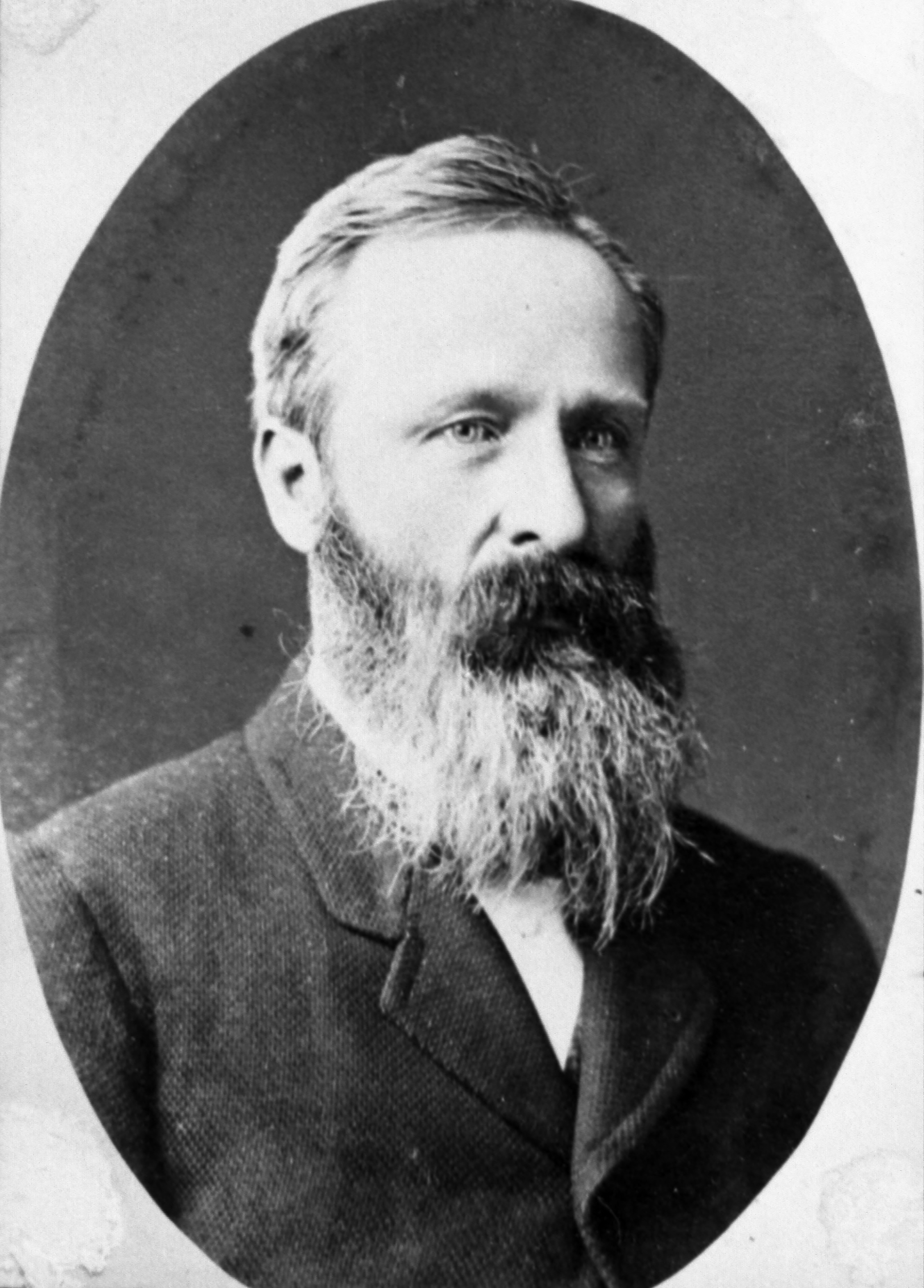
Candidate	Joseph Ward	William Sefton Moorhouse
Party	Independent	Independent
Popular vote	202	177
Percentage	53.30	46.70
Member before election
Arthur Seymour
Independent
Elected Member
Joseph Ward
Independent

The 21 June 1875 Wairau by-election was a by-election held in the Wairau electorate in the Marlborough Province during the 5th New Zealand Parliament. The by-election was caused by the resignation of incumbent MP Arthur Seymour and was won by Joseph Ward, who defeated William Sefton Moorhouse. Ward was a well-known politician in Marlborough. Moorhouse had political seniority over Ward and was at the time Mayor of Wellington, but had no personal connection to Marlborough.

== Background ==
=== Arthur Seymour ===
Arthur Seymour was a prominent politician in the Marlborough Province. Seymour was a member of the Marlborough Provincial Council almost continuously during its existence from 1860 to 1876. He was the leader of the Picton Party that managed to have the provincial buildings for Marlborough built in Picton instead of Blenheim. Seymour was Superintendent of Marlborough in 1864 and 1865, and when he was succeeded by William Henry Eyes, the capital seat was moved to Blenheim. The reason for Seymour's 1865 resignation was his appointment to the Legislative Council. Seymour in turn resigned from the Legislative Council in 1872 so that he could contest the 1872 Wairau by-election caused by Eyes' resignation from the House of Representatives; Seymour won the election. In 1870, Seymour had commenced his second period as Superintendent for Marlborough Province.

Seymour resigned from the House of Representatives in May 1875 to visit England, mainly to see his ailing father while he (his father) was still alive. Seymour informed the public at a meeting on 6 May that he had resigned from Parliament. Seymour stated that he would offer himself as a parliamentary candidate upon his return, and the meeting endorsed this intention. It was the first time that a Superintendent who visited England did not resign that role. Ward was present at Seymour's meeting at after Seymour had spoken, Ward announced his candidacy for the upcoming by-election. Just as Ward finished his speech, Moorhouse walked into the meeting and addressed those present for an hour, also announcing his candidacy.

=== Joseph Ward ===
Joseph Ward was a surveyor by trade, and he became a significant runholder who at one point had 50,000 sheep. He joined provincial politics in 1853 when the provinces were set up. For the first five years, he represented the Wairau electorate in the Nelson Provincial Council. The Marlborough Province split off from Nelson, Ward was elected onto the Marlborough Provincial Council and had continuous representation until the abolition of the provincial system in 1876. Ward also contested the 1872 Wairau by-election, but he lost against Seymour. For both Ward and Seymour, this had been their first attempt of getting elected to the House of Representatives. Seymour supported Ward's candidacy and asked the electors to support Ward and not "a stranger".

=== William Sefton Moorhouse ===
William Sefton Moorhouse was a senior politician who had held many important roles, but he had no connection with Marlborough. Moorhouse was a member of the 1st New Zealand Parliament, and by 1875, he had represented five different electorates in Canterbury and on the West Coast. Moorhouse had twice been Superintendent of Canterbury Province and had the Lyttelton Rail Tunnel built, something that he stressed to the Wairau electors, who were keen for the railway to finally reach Blenheim. Moorhouse, who was in ongoing financial difficulty, had not contested the 1871 election, but had instead taken the job of registrar in the Crown Lands Department in Wellington, and he was made registrar general shortly afterwards. At the end of 1874, he won election as Mayor of Wellington, a role that he still held when he announced himself a candidate for the Wairau by-election.

== Results ==
Four polling booths were provided in the Wairau electorate, and 283 votes were cast. Both candidates won two of the booths, but they had significantly different voter bases. Seymour won the election with a majority of 39 votes.

1875 Wairau by-election
Party	Candidate	Votes	%	±%
Independent	Joseph Ward	202	53.30	+10.19
Independent	William Sefton Moorhouse	177	46.70	
Majority		25	6.60	−7.18
Informal votes		4	1.04	
Turnout		379	94.04	+30.16
Registered electors		403		

The results by polling booth were as follows:

Booth	Moorhouse	Ward	total
Blenheim	125	116	241
Marlborough Town	41	26	67
Renwick	7	36	43
Wairau Valley	2	13	15
Flaxbourne	2	11	13
total	177	202	379

During his absence, Seymour remained in contact with Marlborough via letters and telegrams. He intended to leave for New Zealand again in October 1875, but the ship was cancelled and his journey delayed by several weeks. Meanwhile, the 1876 election was approaching and an election committee formed for Seymour. Meanwhile, George Henderson, a former Mayor of Blenheim, became a candidate in the Wairau electorate whilst Ward announced that he would stand in the Cheviot electorate instead. After further delays, Seymour finally arrived in Blenheim on 14 January 1876 to a welcome function, just two weeks prior to the election. Seymour won the election in the Wairau electorate with 201 votes to 179 for Henderson. Ward was beaten in the Cheviot electorate by Leonard Harper.
