= Henry Dodson =

New Zealand politician

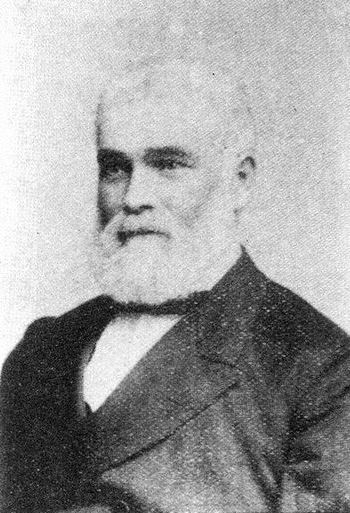
- Henry Dodson

2nd Mayor of Blenheim
- In office 1870–1871
- Preceded by: Frederick John Litchfield
- Succeeded by: George Henderson
- In office 1883–1884
- Preceded by: Frederick Thomas Farmar
- Succeeded by: George Henderson

Personal details
- Born: 21 April 1828 near Malmesbury, Wiltshire, England
- Died: 8 May 1892 (aged 64) Blenheim, New Zealand
- Resting place: Omaka Cemetery
- Relations: Joseph Dodson (brother)

Henry Dodson (21 April 1828 – 8 May 1892) was a brewer and a 19th-century Member of Parliament from Marlborough, New Zealand.

== Biography ==
New Zealand Parliament
Years	Term	Electorate	Party
1881–1884	8th	Wairau	Independent
1884–1887	9th	Wairau	Independent
1887–1890	10th	Wairau	Independent

Dodson was born in 1828 near Malmesbury in Wiltshire, England. His father, Joseph Dodson, was an officer in the British Army. His mother was Isabella Dodson (née Reid). Joseph Dodson was an older brother.

As a youth, he emigrated to Halifax in Nova Scotia, Canada, to join a brother. Together, they went to Victoria, Australia and joined the Victorian gold rush. After that, he came to Nelson, New Zealand and joined his brother Joseph Dodson in his brewery business. He married Emma Snow (born 6 January 1830) on 10 December 1857 at Nelson. He came to Blenheim in the late 1850s and set up a brewery in that town.

Dodson was a member of the Marlborough Provincial Council for three different electorates from 1860–1863, 1866–1870, and 1874–1875. In the provincial council, he was the head of the Blenheim party for many years, and they quarrelled against the Picton party. He was Mayor of Blenheim for four one-year terms (1870–1871 and 1883–1884). He represented the Wairau electorate from 1881 to 1890, when he retired. In 1881, he beat the incumbent, Arthur Seymour. He was challenged by Joseph Ward in 1884. In the 1887 election, he was challenged by a former Mayor of Blenheim, George Henderson, and Sutherland John Macalister.

His wife died in June 1883. He died on 8 May 1892 at his home in Blenheim, New Zealand after a sudden illness and was survived by seven children. He was buried at the Omaka Cemetery in his brother George's family plot in the Old Cemetery section.

New Zealand Parliament
Preceded by Arthur Seymour	Member of Parliament for Wairau; 1881–1890	Succeeded by Lindsay Buick
