= 1868 Picton by-election =

New Zealand by-election

The 1868 Picton by-election was a by-election held on 11 June 1868 in the Picton electorate during the 4th New Zealand Parliament.

The by-election was caused by the resignation of the incumbent MP William Adams on 10 May 1868.

The by-election was won by Courtney Kenny. As no other candidates were nominated, he was declared duly elected. Dr Sickler (or Sickles), described as a "foreign resident" and the nominee of the Superintendent, William Henry Eyes) had retired from the contest, and John Godfrey "who appears to be a local political firebrand, unceasingly moving and restlessly scheming" had apparently not been nominated.
