= 1872 Wairau by-election =

New Zealand by-election

← 1871 general	19 February 1872	1875 by-election →
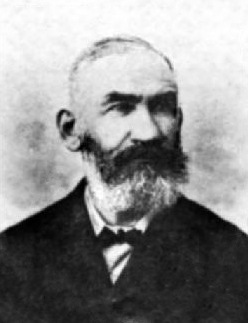

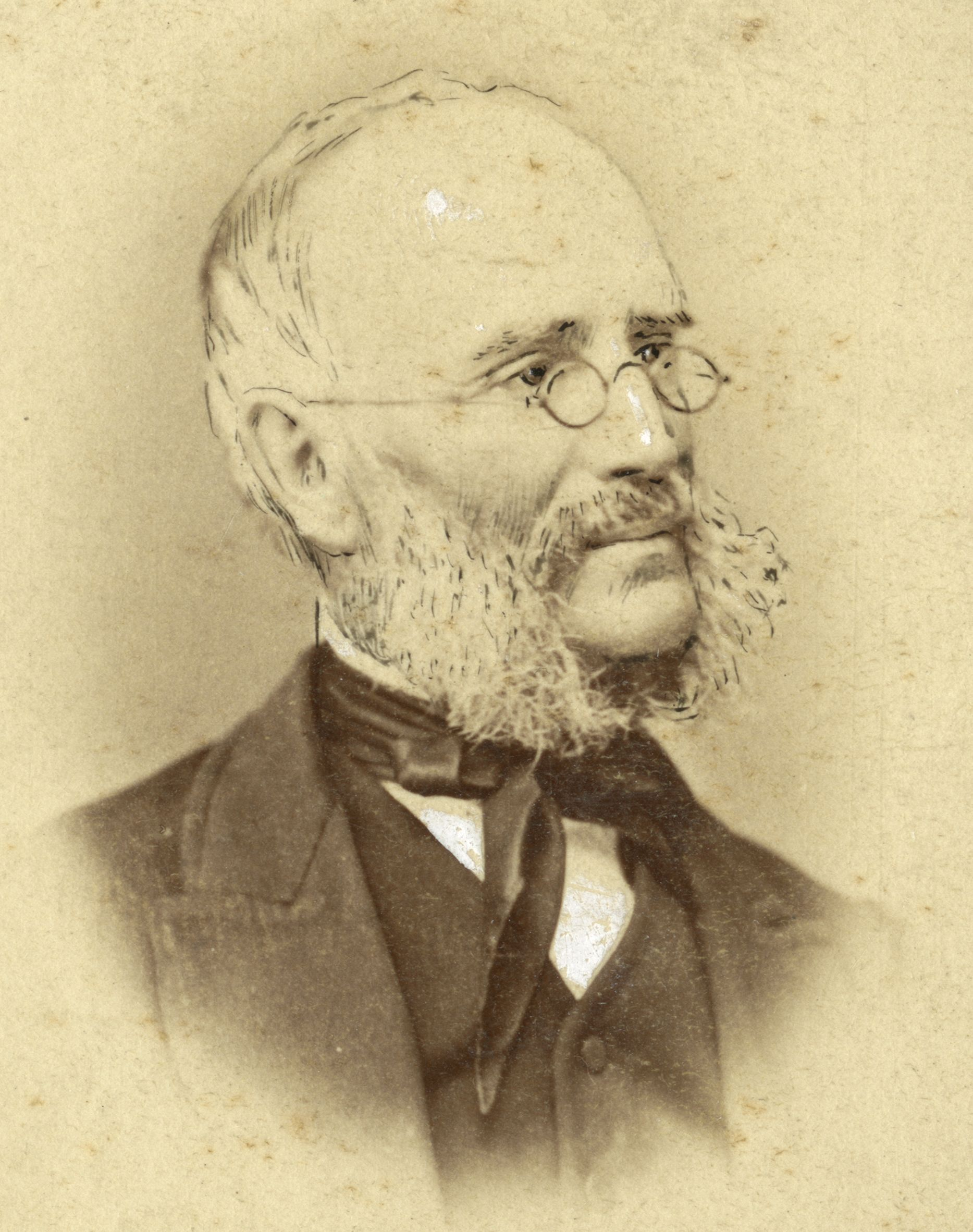
Candidate	Arthur Seymour	Joseph Ward
Party	Independent	Independent
Popular vote	161	122
Percentage	56.89	43.11
Member before election
William Henry Eyes
Independent
Elected Member
Arthur Seymour
Independent

The Wairau by-election 1872 was a by-election held in the Wairau electorate during the 5th New Zealand Parliament, on 19 February 1872. The by-election was caused by the resignation of incumbent MP William Henry Eyes and was won by Arthur Seymour, who defeated Joseph Ward. Both candidates were prominent Marlborough politicians, and for both of them, this was their first attempt at election to the General Assembly.

== Background ==
=== Incumbent ===
William Henry Eyes became a member of the Marlborough Provincial Council in 1860, and in the 1861 general election, he became a member of the General Assembly for the Wairau electorate by defeating the incumbent, the later premier Frederick Weld. Eyes was Superintendent of Marlborough Province from 1865 to 1870, but some of his actions as Superintendent made him a controversial figure. At the 1866 election, Eyes was returned unopposed for the Wairau electorate. In 1871, Eyes was challenged by Henry Redwood but remained the preferred representative by the voters. In December 1871, Eyes was appointed Crown Lands Commissioner for the Marlborough Province and as a public servant, he could no longer hold a seat in parliament or the provincial council and had to resign. This resignation triggered the parliamentary by-election.

=== Arthur Seymour ===
Arthur Seymour was another prominent politician in the Marlborough Province, and a strong rival of Eyes. Seymour was a member of the Marlborough Provincial Council almost continuously during its existence from 1860 to 1876. He was the leader of the Picton Party that managed to have the provincial buildings for Marlborough built in Picton instead of Blenheim. Seymour was Superintendent of Marlborough in 1864 and 1865, and when he was succeeded by Eyes, the capital seat was moved to Blenheim. The reason for Seymour's 1865 resignation was his appointment to the Legislative Council. Seymour in turn resigned from the Legislative Council in 1872 so that he could contest the Wairau by-election. In 1870, Seymour had commenced his second period as Superintendent for Marlborough Province.

=== Joseph Ward ===
Joseph Ward was a surveyor by trade, and he became a significant runholder who at one point had 50,000 sheep. He joined provincial politics in 1853 when the provinces were set up. For the first five years, he represented the Wairau electorate in the Nelson Provincial Council. The Marlborough Province split off from Nelson, Ward was elected onto the Marlborough Provincial Council and had continuous representation until the abolition of the provincial system in 1876. Like Seymour, standing in the Wairau by-election was Ward's first attempt of getting elected to the general assembly.

== Nomination ==
The nomination meeting was held at Blenheim on Wednesday, 14 February. The show of hands resulted in 27 votes for Seymour, and 14 for Ward. The supporters of Ward demanded a poll, and the date for this was set as Monday, 19 February.

== Results ==
Four polling booths were provided in the Wairau electorate, and 283 votes were cast. Both candidates won two of the booths, but they had significantly different voter bases. Seymour won the election with a majority of 39 votes.

1872 Wairau by-election
Party	Candidate	Votes	%	±%
Independent	Arthur Seymour	161	56.89	
Independent	Joseph Ward	122	43.11	
Majority		39	13.78	
Turnout		283	63.88	
Registered electors		443		

The results by polling booth were as follows:

Booth	Seymour	Ward	total
Blenheim	145	88	233
Renwicktown	9	24	33
Wairau Valley	1	8	9
Flaxbourne	6	2	8
total	161	122	283

Seymour remained a member of the General Assembly until his resignation in 1875 prior to a trip to England. The resulting 1875 by-election was won by Ward, who defeated William Sefton Moorhouse.
