= 1867 Picton by-election =

New Zealand by-election

The 1867 Picton by-election was a by-election held on 25 July 1867 in the Picton electorate during the 4th New Zealand Parliament.

The by-election was caused by the resignation of the incumbent MP Arthur Beauchamp on 12 July 1867. He had been elected on 14 March 1866 (see 1866 New Zealand general election), but did not have the private income then required to be a parliamentarian.

The by-election was won by William Adams. As no other candidates were nominated, he was declared duly elected.
