= Waimea-Picton =

Waimea-Picton was a parliamentary electorate in the Marlborough and Nelson Regions of New Zealand, from 1887 to 1893.

== Population centres ==
In the 1887 electoral redistribution, although the Representation Commission was required through the Representation Act 1887 to maintain existing electorates "as far as possible", rapid population growth in the North Island required the transfer of three seats from the South Island to the north. Ten new electorates were created, including Waimea-Picton, and one former electorate was recreated. The electorate's original area covered the surroundings of the city of Nelson including Richmond, Havelock, and Picton. The southern boundary was the Wairau River.

In December 1887, the House of Representatives voted to reduce its membership from general electorates from 91 to 70. The 1890 electoral redistribution used the same 1886 census data used for the 1887 electoral redistribution. In addition, three-member electorates were introduced in the four main centres. This resulted in a major restructuring of electorates, and the area covered by the Waimea-Picton electorate was significantly altered. The southern boundary shifted north, i.e. away from the Wairau River. Richmond was lost to the Nelson electorate, and the area covered extended to the north-west to just short of Motueka, absorbing much of the area previously covered by the Motueka electorate.

In the 1893 electoral redistribution, population shift to the North Island required the transfer of one seat from the South Island to the north. The resulting ripple effect saw every electorate established in 1890 have its boundaries altered, and many electorates, including Waimea-Picton, were abolished. Most of its area went to the Waimea-Sounds electorate. The town of Picton went to the Wairau electorate, but the town of Motueka was gained from the Buller electorate.

== History ==
The electorate was represented by two Members of Parliament, Arthur Seymour from 1887 to 1890 and Charlie Mills from 1890 to 1893.

The 1887 general election was contested by Seymour, Joseph Harkness and Mills, who received 446, 444 and 415 votes, respectively.

The 1890 general election in the Waimea-Picton electorate was contested by Mills, Richmond Hursthouse and William Henry Phillips, who received 936, 728 and 80 votes, respectively. Mills was thus elected.

=== Election results ===
Key

Independent Liberal

Election	Winner
1887 election	Arthur Seymour
1890 election	Charlie Mills

== Election results ==
=== 1890 election ===
1890 general election: Waimea-Picton
Party	Candidate	Votes	%	±%
Liberal	Charlie Mills	940	54.11	
Conservative	Richmond Hursthouse	730	42.02	
Independent	William Henry Phillips	67	3.85	
Majority		210	12.08	
Turnout		1,737	65.59	
Registered electors		2,648		
