= Courtney Kenny =

Courtney Kenny may refer to:

- Courtney Kenny (New Zealand politician)
- Courtney Kenny (British politician)
