= Joseph Ward (Marlborough politician) =

New Zealand politician and surveyor (1817–1892)

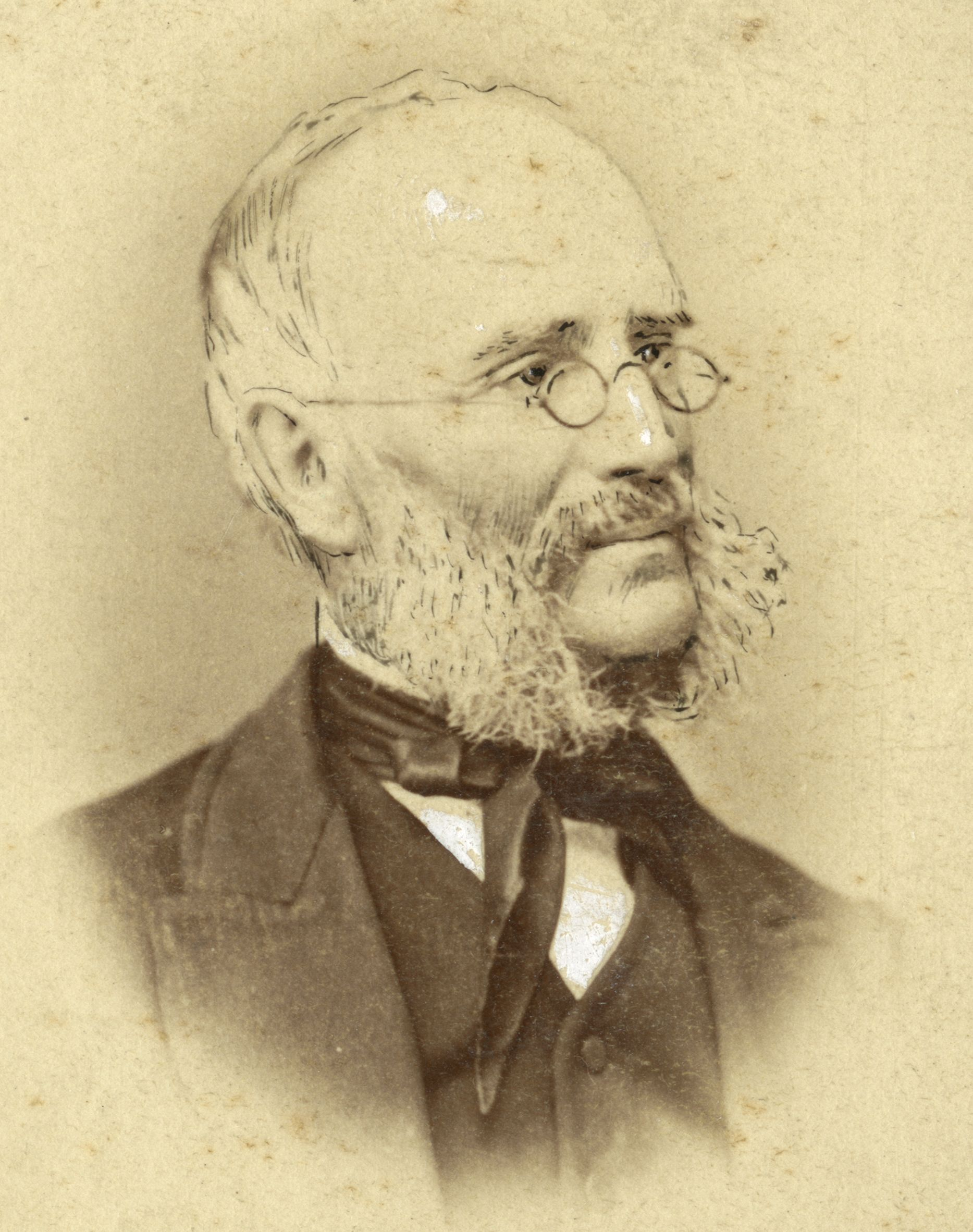
- Ward in the 1880s

Member of the New Zealand Parliament for Wairau
- In office 21 June – 6 December 1875

Personal details
- Born: 1817 Tixall, Staffordshire, England
- Died: 12 November 1892 (aged 75) Blythefield, Blenheim, New Zealand
- Party: Independent
- Spouse: Martha Redwood
- Relations: Henry Redwood (brother-in-law); Francis Redwood (brother-in-law)

Joseph Ward (1817 – 12 November 1892) was a 19th-century Member of Parliament from Marlborough, New Zealand.

== Early life ==
Ward was born at Tixall in Staffordshire, England. He was baptised at Tixall on 21 August 1817. He emigrated to Nelson in 1842 on the George Fyfe. He travelled with his wife, Martha, and her family; Henry Redwood and Francis Redwood were her brothers. He was a devout Catholic. Since 1854, he had lived in Brookby, a locality some 7 kilometres (4.3 mi) south of Renwick.

Ward was a surveyor by trade, and he surveyed parts of the Wairau Valley, and the town and district of Kaikōura. He became a significant runholder who at one point had 46,000 sheep.

== Political career ==
New Zealand Parliament
Years	Term	Electorate	Party
1875	5th	Wairau	Independent

Ward was elected to the first Nelson Provincial Council for the Wairau electorate; he and Charles Elliott were declared elected unopposed. Ward represented the Wairau electorate for five years. When the Marlborough Province split off from Nelson, Ward was elected onto the Marlborough Provincial Council and had continuous representation until the abolition of the provincial system in 1876. Ward's first attempt of getting elected to the general assembly was in the 1872 Wairau by-election, but he was beaten by Arthur Seymour. When Seymour resigned in 1875 prior to a trip to England, Ward won the resulting 1875 by-election and represented the electorate from 21 June to 6 December, when he was defeated for Cheviot.

== Death and commemoration ==
Ward had been ill for a few months prior to his death, and for the last few days was unconscious. He died on 12 November 1892 at his home. He was buried in the catholic section of the Omaka Cemetery with his son Joseph and daughter Francis. He was survived by his wife, six sons, and two daughters.

Wards Pass, an alpine pass that lies between the valleys of the upper Acheron and Awatere Rivers, was discovered by Ward and his brother-in-law, Cyrus Goulter, (Note: Goulter was married to Anne Mary Redwood, a sister to Ward's wife Martha Redwood) in March 1847, and is named after him.

== Notes ==
New Zealand Parliament
Preceded by Arthur Seymour	Member of Parliament for Wairau; 1875	Succeeded by Arthur Seymour
