= Ōnahau Bay =

Locality in New Zealand

- Location: Marlborough Sounds
- Coordinates: 41°13′47″S 173°58′13″E

Ōnahau Bay in Tōtaranui / Queen Charlotte Sound

Ōnahau Bay is a large bay in Queen Charlotte Sound, New Zealand, just north-east of Grove Arm and meeting it at Houhou Point.

== Naming ==
The meaning of the name Ōnahau is unclear. On the Western side of the bay is a hill called Ōnahau, either the bay's namesake or named for it. The name is also used for Ōnahau River and Little Ōnahau River in the Tasman District.

== Local geographies ==
=== Fence Bay ===
Fence Bay is one of three bays that sit in the back of Ōnahau Bay, along with Waterfall Bay and Mistletoe Bay. It was named for a fence that climbed a steep border between the farms of Vogel and Gullery in the middle of the 20th century.

=== Mistletoe Bay ===
Mistletoe Bay is one of three bays that sit in the back of Ōnahau Bay, along with Waterfall Bay and Fence Bay. Mistletoe is likely a reference to one of New Zealand's nine native mistletoes, the most likely culprits being Peraxilla tetrapetala (pirirangi/pikirangi), Peraxilla colensoi (pirita/pirinoa) and Alepis flavida (pirita/pirinoa), as they commonly grow in beech forests like the Nothofagus solandri (tawairauriki/tawhairauriki) forests historically found along Queen Charlotte Sound.

=== Waterfall Bay ===
Waterfall Bay is one of three bays that sit in the back of Ōnahau Bay, along with Mistletoe Bay and Fence Bay. The bay is home to at least one magnificent waterfall, from which it draws its name. The bay is home to pūrātoke glow-worms, bioluminescent plankton and stingrays.

=== Torapapa Point ===
Torapapa Point is located on the eastern tip of Ōnahau Bay. The point was labelled "Toropapa Point" on maps until sometime between 1949 and 1959.

=== Dartmoor Bay ===
Dartmoor Bay is located near the western tip of Ōnahau Bay, just north of Houhou Point.

Dartmoor Bay derives its name from a cottage built there named Dartmoor owned by Mr Herbert Yelverton Monro. Herbert owned the Bankhouse run and station in the fork of the Wairau and Waihopai rivers in Marlborough. The Monro family has no known connection to Dartmoor in the United Kingdom.

=== Postman's Rock ===
Postman's Rock is a large rock just west of Torapapa Point. The rock is named for when the Queen Charlotte Sound mail-boat was a rowboat and would deposit mail upon it for the sound's residents to row out and pick up. Alternatively known as Post Office Rock.
