= Henry Redwood =

New Zealand farmer and politician (1823–1907)

Henry Redwood (24 January 1823 – 9 November 1907) was a New Zealand farmer, politician and racehorse breeder.

== Biography ==
He was born in Tixall, Staffordshire, England in 1823. His parents were Henry Redwood Sr. and Mary (née Gilbert). The family with nine children and one son-in-law—Joseph Ward—emigrated to New Zealand on the George Fyfe in 1842. Henry Redwood Jr. was a brother of Francis Redwood, and an uncle of Vernon Redwood. He lived at Stafford Place in Appleby near Richmond. He was a member of the Nelson Provincial Council from 1863 and of the Marlborough Provincial Council from 1868. He contested the 1871 election in the Wairau electorate against the incumbent, William Henry Eyes, but received just 38% of the votes and was thus unsuccessful.

== Racehorses ==
Henry Redwood was prominent in the thoroughbred racing industry. He was called the "Father of the New Zealand Turf" and established a stud at Hednesford, likely the first in New Zealand. He imported the stallion, Sir Hercules, along with other bloodstock from Australia and France.

His wins included:

- On 4 March 1863 his mare, Ladybird, won the first New Zealand Champion Race against horses from Australia and New Zealand.
- the Wellington Cup twice: Korari in 1876 and Guy Fawkes in 1877.
- the Dunedin Cup with Lurline in 1874.
- the Canterbury Jockey Club Handicap (which later became the New Zealand Cup): Peeress (1871), Kakapo (1873), Guy Fawkes (1876) and Mata (1877).
- the Canterbury Derby with Manuka (1869), Papapa (1873) and Songster (1876).
- the Nelson Cup with Clogs (1885), Alpine Rose (1886) and Awarua Rose (1892).
- the Marlborough Cup.

He was a steward for the Nelson Jockey Club from 1848. Henry Redwood also raced in partnership with Hugh Stafford, and later with George Stead.

His racing colours were a black jacket and red cap. These were also carried on by son, Joseph.

Henry Redwood was inducted into the New Zealand Racing Hall of Fame in 2008 and he was the great great uncle of fellow member Murray Baker.
