= Frederick Litchfield =

Frederick Litchfield may refer to:

- Frederick Henry Litchfield (1832–1867), South Australian pastoralist, gold miner and explorer
- Frederick John Litchfield (1820–1900), New Zealand settler, mayor of Blenheim
