= Lochmara Bay =

Locality in New Zealand

- Māori: Pehautangia
- Location within Marlborough Sounds
- Location: Queen Charlotte Sound / Tōtaranui, Marlborough Sounds
- Coordinates: 41.2293°S 174.0009°E

Lochmara Bay in Queen Charlotte Sound

Lochmara Bay (Māori: Pehautangia) is a large bay in Queen Charlotte Sound, New Zealand, north of Picton. Until the 1860s it was officially known by the Māori name Pehautangia.

== Naming ==
Lochmara Bay takes its name from the pastoral run set up there by Courtney Kenny (1835–1905) in 1857 called Lochmara Run. The name is a thought to be a contraction of Loch na Mara, Scottish Gaelic for 'loch of the sea'.

Pehautangia means 'place of roaring winds', a reference to the rough gales there.

== History ==
In 1857 Courtney Kenny took out a depasturage license for all of the land between Tōrea Bay and Ōnahau Bay in Queen Charlotte Sound, and between Te Mahia Bay and Portage in Kenepuru Sound. He named his pastoral run Lochmara Run, a name likely reflecting the Scottish and Irish connection of his wife Georgina Kenny (1835–1899). The Lochmara Run was initially about 2,000 hectares, but Kenny disposed of some in 1860, and converted around 1766 hectares to secure leasehold and freehold tenures. The 1880 block sheets show Kenny had cleared nearly half of his land of native bush, largely on the Lochmara Peninsula, Tōrea Bay, and Double Cove, along with a swath from West Bay to Pukatea Bay. Kenny would go on to sell portions of the run to the Gullery family, with both families running sheep there for many years. Farming would come to an end on the remains of Lochmara Run by 1960, the land having been retaken by growth, making farming impossible. The land was subdivided for holiday housing in the 1960s, with some becoming the Lochmara Bay Scenic Reserve.

By 1917 Lochmara Bay had been surveyed for townships. The majority of these lots never came to fruition, but some were developed by Marlborough families, who built houses and shacks there. After the Second World War more lots were subdivided and sold, some smaller than a hectare, and holiday housing became more popular along with the advent of improved roads and railways. In 1950 Lochmara Bay had around 20 houses, today it has about 100.

== Contained geographies ==
=== East and West Bay ===
East Bay is located near the back of Lochmara Bay on its eastern coast, while West Bay is located at the very back of the bay on its west coast.

=== Hautehoro Point ===
Hautehoro Point sits on the western tip of Lochmara Bay. Evidence of pit dwellings has been found here, suggesting it may have been used as a look-out or temporary dwelling.

=== Nohokouau Point ===
Nohokouau Point sits on the eastern tip of Lochmara Bay. Nohokouau can be translated as 'to sit in sprinkling rain'.

=== Double Cove ===
Double Cove is located just outside of the eastern tip of Lochmara Bay. Double Cove consists of two arms connected by a large cove, resembling a crab claw and giving the cove its name.
