= Omaka Cemetery =

Historic cemetery in Blenheim, New Zealand

Details
- Location: Blenheim
- Country: New Zealand
- Coordinates: 41°32′16″S 173°56′24″E
- Owned by: Marlborough District Council
- No. of graves: 10,000 +
- Website: www.marlborough.govt.nz/services/cemeteries/omaka-cemetery
- Find a Grave: Omaka Cemetery

Omaka Cemetery (also known as Blenheim Omaka Public Cemetery) is a historic cemetery in Blenheim, New Zealand founded in the 1850s. With over 10,000 burials, it is the largest cemetery in Marlborough due to its proximity to the region’s capital. The cemetery ceased accepting burials in the late 1970s but was reopened in 2011. The cemetery comprises three separate lawns, numbered one to three. Lawns one and two were established in the mid-nineteenth century. Lawn three was established during World War I and was originally used as a cemetery for returned servicemen. Over time, it became the main cemetery for the Marlborough region. Fairhall Cemetery is now the primary cemetery in Marlborough.

== Burials ==
Notable burials in Lawn One (Old Cemetery) and Lawn Two (Catholic Cemetery) include:

- Kimball Bent (1837–1916), soldier and adventurer who joined the Māori rebellion during the New Zealand Wars
- Arthur Carkeek (1843–1897), New Zealand Cross recipient
- Thomas Carter (1827–1900), third superintendent of Marlborough Province
- Henry Dodson (1828–1892), brewer and early mayor of Blenheim
- William Girling (1882–1973), politician
- Thomas Grace (Archdeacon of Marlborough) (1850-1919), Vicar and Archdeacon of Marlborough. Son of Thomas Grace (missionary)
- Richard McCallum (1863–1940), politician
- Mary Müller (1820–1901), suffragist
- William Gilbert Rees (1827–1898), founder of Queenstown
- James Sinclair (1817–1897), founder of Blenheim

Notable burials in Lawn Three (New Cemetery) include:

- Fen Cresswell (1915–1966), cricketer
- Gunner A. J. Healy (1895–1966), soldier whose arrest in 1917 sparked the Étaples mutiny
- Ted Meachen (1895–1970), politician
- Charles H. Mills (1843–1923), politician
- Edith Rudd (1882–1967), nurse, Florence Nightingale Medal recipient
- Charles Saunders (1902–1994), Olympic rower
