= Thomas Carter (New Zealand politician) =

New Zealand politician (1827–1900)

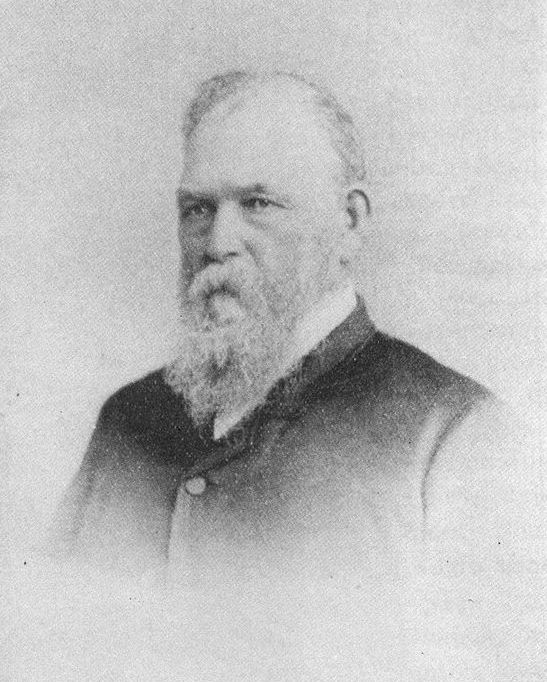
- Portrait of Thomas Carter

3rd Superintendent of Marlborough Province
- In office 25 March 1863 – 30 July 1864
- Preceded by: Captain W. D. H. Baillie
- Succeeded by: Arthur Seymour

Personal details
- Born: 24 January 1827 Winterton, Lincolnshire, England
- Died: 27 February 1900 (aged 73) Blenheim, New Zealand
- Occupation: Runholder, politician

Thomas Carter (24 January 1827 – 27 February 1900) was the third Superintendent of Marlborough Province. Together with two of his brothers, he was a large runholder.

== Early life ==
Carter was born in Winterton, Lincolnshire in 1827, where he also received his education. As a young adult, he joined the Californian Gold Rush. From there, he was attracted to Australia by its gold rushes.

== New Zealand ==
He came to Nelson, New Zealand in 1854 or 1855 with his brothers James and Joseph. They took up the Hillersden Run, a sheep farm, in the Wairau Valley in 1855. The brothers acquired large land holdings and, apart from the Wairau River, farmed in locations on the Acheron, Waiau Toa / Clarence, Severn, and Alma Rivers. Their sheep runs included Stronvar, Wantwood, the Wither, Glenfield, Te Arowhenua, Richmond Dale, the Clarence, and Burleigh, and the Carter brothers were regarded as the wool kings of the Wairau Valley. They also grew flax and had a flax mill at their Hillersden Run.

Carter was first elected onto the Marlborough Provincial Council for the Wairau Valley electorate on 15 August 1862. He remained an elected member until the abolition of the provincial government system at the end of 1876. He was Superintendent of Marlborough Province from 25 March 1863 until 30 July 1864, when he resigned as the role took up too much of his time. He was on the Executive Council of the Marlborough Provincial Council in 1867 and 1870.

Thomas Carter married Catherine Schroder, a daughter of G. W. Schroder, in 1866. His brother Joseph returned to England in 1867, where he died at the end of that year. His brother James, who had been Joseph's heir, died in 1881. Half of James' shareholding was left to Thomas Carter, whilst the other half was divided between two half-sisters and one half-brother in Lincolnshire, England. In 1886, Carter visited Britain, and over the next ten years, he visited cities in New Zealand and Australia. In 1891, Carter bought the Wither Run on the outskirts of Blenheim, including the Burleigh homestead. The Carters lived at Burleigh from 1897 onwards. In 1899, he donated 3 acres (1.2 ha) of land on which Marlborough High School was established, which is now known as Marlborough Boys' College. He died on 27 February 1900 at Blenheim and was buried at the Omaka Cemetery.

== Notes ==
Political offices
Preceded by Captain W. D. H. Baillie	Superintendent of Marlborough Province; 1863–1864	Succeeded by Arthur Seymour
