= William Girling =

New Zealand politician (1882–1973)

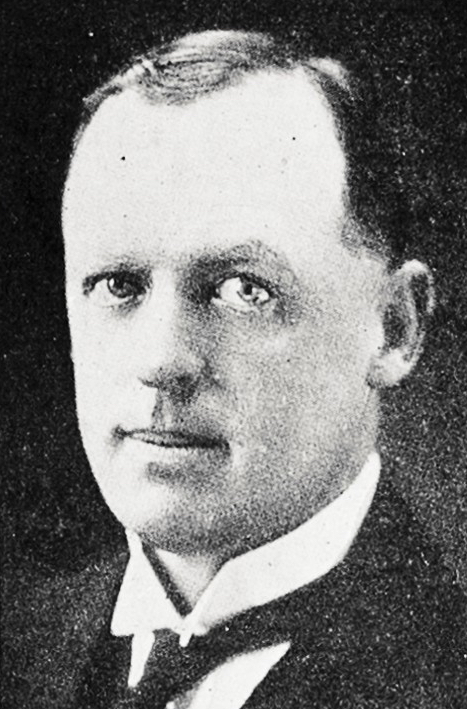
Girling in 1922

William James Girling CBE (9 March 1882 – 7 September 1973) was a Reform Party Member of Parliament in New Zealand.

He was elected to the Wairau electorate in the 1922 general election, but was defeated in 1928 by Edward Healy of the United Party by a 3% vote margin. He was elected as Mayor of Blenheim and served from 1945 to 1950. For the 1931 election, the Reform and United parties formed a coalition. Part of the agreement was that all incumbents would become the coalition's candidate. Girling stood as an independent in 1931 in opposition to Healy but was again unsuccessful, this time by a 15% vote margin.

New Zealand Parliament
Years	Term	Electorate	Party
1922–1925	21st	Wairau	Reform
1925–1928	22nd	Wairau	Reform

In 1935, he was awarded the King George V Silver Jubilee Medal. In November 1947, he was elected Grand Master of the Masonic Order in New Zealand.

In the 1950 King's Birthday Honours, Girling was appointed a Commander of the Order of the British Empire for public services, especially in the Marlborough provincial district. He was appointed to the Legislative Council on 22 June 1950 as a member of the so-called suicide squad to vote for its abolition. In 1953, Girling was awarded the Queen Elizabeth II Coronation Medal.

Girling died in 1973 and was buried at Omaka Cemetery, Blenheim.

New Zealand Parliament
Preceded by Richard McCallum	Member of Parliament for Wairau; 1922–1928	Succeeded by Edward Healy
