= Charlie Mills (politician) =

New Zealand politician (1843–1923)

The Honourable Charlie Mills
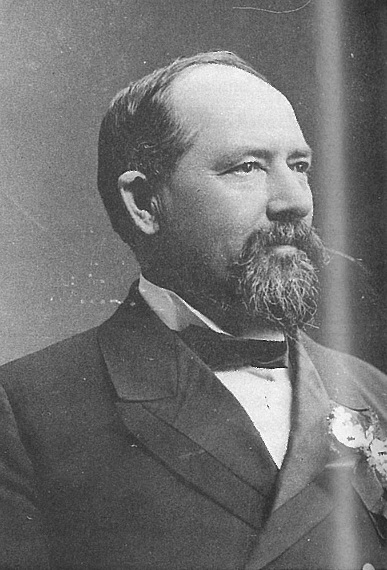

21st Minister of Customs
- In office 29 October 1900 – 6 August 1906
- Prime Minister: Richard Seddon; William Hall-Jones
- Preceded by: Richard Seddon
- Succeeded by: Alexander Hogg

Personal details
- Born: 1843 Nelson, New Zealand
- Died: 3 April 1923 (aged 79–80) New Zealand
- Party: Liberal
- Spouse: Margaret Morrison (m. 1871)
- Relations: Haddon Donald (great-grandson)

Charles Houghton Mills (1843 – 3 April 1923), known as Charlie, was a member of parliament for Waimea and Wairau, in the South Island of New Zealand.

== Early life ==
Mills was born in Nelson. His parents were Richard Mills and Annie Sophia Mills (née Hearne), who arrived in Nelson in 1841 on the Lord Auckland. The family moved to Wellington in the early 1850s, where his father was Governor of the jail, and where Charles Mills was educated. He was a pupil teacher at Te Aro school. He went to sea for some years, and then worked in mining and farming. Later, Mills was a commission agent.

Mills settled in Havelock in 1871 and married Margaret, a daughter of John Morrison, in the same year.

== Member of Parliament ==
New Zealand Parliament
Years	Term	Electorate	Party
1890–1893	11th	Waimea-Picton	Liberal
1893–1896	12th	Waimea-Sounds	Liberal
1896–1899	13th	Wairau	Liberal
1899–1902	14th	Wairau	Liberal
1902–1905	15th	Wairau	Liberal
1905–1908	16th	Wairau	Liberal

The 1887 general election in the Waimea-Picton electorate was contested by Arthur Seymour, Joseph Harkness and Mills, who received 446, 444 and 415 votes, respectively. Seymour was thus elected.

The 1890 general election in the Waimea-Picton electorate was contested by Mills, Richmond Hursthouse and William Henry Phillips, who received 936, 728 and 80 votes, respectively. Mills was thus elected and represented the electorate until the end of the term in 1893. He then represented the successor electorates of Waimea-Sounds (1893–1896) and Wairau (1896–1908) in the New Zealand House of Representatives. The 1896 general election was contested by the incumbent Lindsay Buick and Mills, who received 2014 and 2072 votes, respectively. Mills thus succeeded Buick in Wairau.

Mills served as the Liberal Party's Senior Whip from 1894 until his elevation to cabinet in 1900. He was Minister of Trade and Customs between 1900 and 1906 and Minister of Immigration in 1906.

He was a member of the Provincial Council and Marlborough County Council, and of the Legislative Council between 1909 and 1916.

In 1897, Mills sued the Otago Daily Times and The Press for defamation, after they published a story which alleged the MP had had a police constable, John Jeffries, transferred to another district because he had not voted for him. The jury in the Otago Daily Times case awarded Mills £150 in damages and £69 costs, while The Press won its case and was awarded costs of £150.

== Death ==
Mills died on 3 April 1923 and was buried at Omaka Cemetery, Blenheim. He was survived by his wife.

== Notes ==
Political offices
Preceded by Richard Seddon	Minister of Customs; 1900–1906	Succeeded by John A. Millar
New Zealand Parliament
Preceded by Arthur Seymour	Member of Parliament for Waimea-Picton; 1890–1893	Electorate abolished
New constituency	Member of Parliament for Waimea-Sounds; 1893–1896	Electorate abolished
Preceded by Lindsay Buick	Member of Parliament for Wairau; 1896–1908	Succeeded by John Duncan
Party political offices
Preceded by Frank Lawry	Senior Whip of the Liberal Party; 1894–1900	Succeeded by Jack Stevens
