= Waimea-Sounds (electorate) =

Waimea-Sounds was a fully rural parliamentary electorate in the Marlborough and Nelson Regions of New Zealand, from 1893 to 1896. During its one parliamentary term of existence, the Waimea-Sounds electorate was represented by one Member of Parliament.

== Population centres ==
In the 1892 electoral redistribution, population shift to the North Island required the transfer of one seat from the South Island to the north. The resulting ripple effect saw every electorate established in 1890 have its boundaries altered, and many new electorates were created, including Waimea-Sounds. The electorate superseded the Waimea-Picton electorate, but lost the town of Picton to the Wairau electorate, and gained the town of Motueka from the Buller electorate. Havelock was also located in the Waimea-Sounds electorate. The Waimea-Sounds electorate was classed as fully rural, and the full 28% of the country quota applied. There were 2,812 electors registered for the 1893 election.

The Waimea-Sounds electorate was abolished after one parliamentary term in the 1896 electoral redistribution. Its area was distributed to the City of Nelson, Motueka, and Wairau electorates.

== History ==
The Waimea-Sounds electorate was represented by one Member of Parliament, Charlie Mills. Mills had, since the 1890 election, represented the Waimea-Picton electorate. After the Waimea-Sounds was abolished, he successfully stood in the Wairau electorate in 1896.

=== Election results ===
The Waimea-Sounds electorate was represented by one Member of Parliament.

Key

Liberal

Election	Winner
1893 election	Charlie Mills
(Electorate abolished in 1896)

1893 general election: Waimea-Sounds
Party	Candidate	Votes	%	±%
Liberal	Charlie Mills	936	53.67	
Conservative	Richmond Hursthouse	728	41.74	
Independent	William Henry Phillips	80	4.59	
Majority		208	11.93	
Turnout		1,744		
Registered electors				
