= Arthur Beauchamp =

New Zealand politician

Arthur Beauchamp (1827 – 28 April 1910) was a New Zealand politician who was a member of New Zealand Parliament. He was the father of Harold Beauchamp, chairman of the Bank of New Zealand, and the grandfather of writer Katherine Mansfield.

== Biography ==
New Zealand Parliament
| Years | Term | Electorate | Party |
|---|---|---|---|
| 1866–1867 | 4th | Picton | Independent |

Beauchamp came to Nelson from Australia on the Lalla Rookh, arriving on 23 February 1861.

He lived much of his life in a number of locations around the top of the South Island, also Whanganui when Harold was 11 for seven years and then to the capital (Wellington). Then south to Christchurch and finally Picton and the Sounds. He had business failures and was bankrupted twice, in 1879 and 1884. He married Mary Stanley on the Victorian goldfields in 1854. Six of their ten children born between 1855 and 1893 died, including the first two sons born before Harold.

Beauchamp represented the Picton electorate from 1866 to 1867, when he resigned. He had the energy and sociability required for politics, but not the private income then required to be a parliamentarian. He supported the working man and the subdivision of big estates, opposed the confiscation of Māori land and was later recognised as a founding Liberal, the party that Harold supported and was a "fixer" for. Yska calls their life an extended chronicle of rootlessness, business failure and almost ceaseless family tragedy and Harold called his father a rolling stone by instinct.

Arthur also served on the council of Marlborough Province and is best-remembered for a 10-hour speech to that body when an attempt was made to relocate the capital from Picton to Blenheim.

In 1866 he attempted to sue the Speaker of the House, David Monro. At the time the extent of privilege held by Members of Parliament was unclear; a select committee ruled that the case could proceed, but with a stay until after the parliamentary session.

== See also ==
- Yska, Redmer (2017). A Strange Beautiful Excitement: Katherine Mansfield's Wellington 1888-1903. Dunedin: Otago University Press. pp. 91–99. ISBN 978-0-947522-54-4.

New Zealand Parliament
| Preceded by David Monro | Member of Parliament for Picton; 1866–1867 | Succeeded by William Adams |
