= W. D. H. Baillie =

New Zealand politician

Captain W. D. H. Baillie
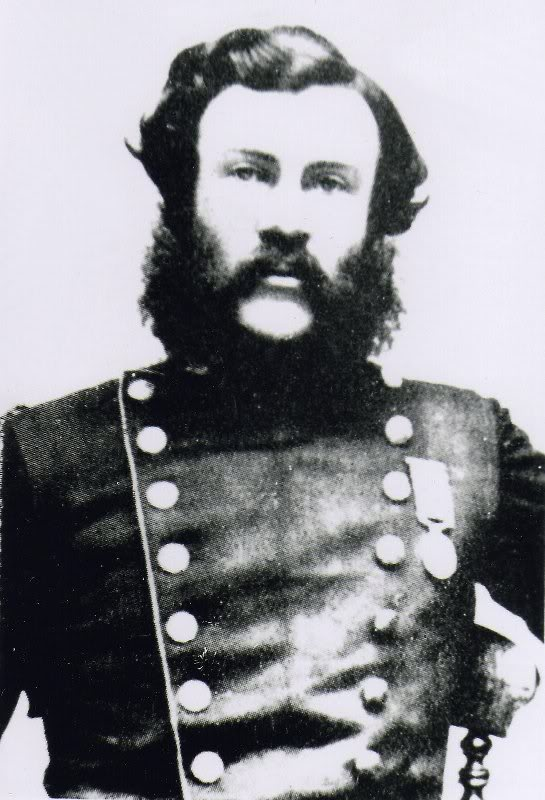
- Portrait of W. D. H. Baillie

2nd Superintendent of Marlborough Province
- In office 28 August 1861 – 18 February 1863
- Preceded by: William Adams
- Succeeded by: Thomas Carter

2nd Chairman of Committees
- In office 1879–1902
- Preceded by: Mathew Richmond
- Succeeded by: William Cowper Smith

Personal details
- Born: 22 February 1827 Fredericton, New Brunswick, Canada
- Died: 24 February 1922 (aged 95) Maoribank, Upper Hutt, New Zealand
- Occupation: Soldier, politician

William Douglas Hall Baillie (22 February 1827 – 24 February 1922) was a New Zealand politician. He was known as W. D. H. Baillie and often referred to as Captain Baillie owing to his military background.

== Early life ==
Baillie was born in 1827 in Fredericton, New Brunswick, Canada. His parents were Thomas Baillie from Scotland and his first wife, Elizabeth (née Monckton-Hall). His parents had married in 1824 in Limerick, Ireland, and later that year, Thomas Baillie had joined the Colonial Office, and had quickly been appointed commissioner of Crown lands and Surveyor General of New Brunswick. Baillie Jr. received his education at Royal Military Academy, Woolwich. He received a commission to the 24th (2nd Warwickshire) Regiment of Foot and spent six years in India, where he saw action in the Second Anglo-Sikh War, with battles at the Chenab River, at Sadoolapore, Chillianwala, and Gujrat. He returned to England in 1853 and was promoted to the rank of captain.

Baillie married Hannah Maria Ann Greensill on 11 July 1854 at West Thurrock in Essex. She was the daughter of John Greensill, and a cousin of Frederick Roberts, the latter of whom would make a career with the British army. The Baillies were to have three sons and one daughter.

== Life in New Zealand ==
Baillie resigned from the army in 1857 and the family came to New Zealand on the Oriental. He initially had a sheep run of 5,000 acres (2,000 ha) in the Wairau Valley but sold the land at settled at Para near Picton.

Baillie was first elected to the Marlborough Provincial Council in 1860, when he represented the Wairau electorate. He was the second Superintendent of Marlborough Province (28 August 1861 – 18 February 1863) and the longest-serving member of the New Zealand Legislative Council; 61 years, from 8 March 1861 to his death on 24 February 1922. He was the second Chairman of Committees of the Legislative Council. From 1890, Baillie's vision deteriorated and later on, he was totally blind. His wife would bring him into the Legislative Council chamber and put him into his seat. He was last elected as Chairman of Committees in 1901 when he consented to stand in a ballot; the intention was to keep out the government nominee, William Cowper Smith. Once Smith was eliminated from the ballot, Baillie wanted to withdraw, but the Speaker would not allow him to speak over a misunderstanding. When the other remaining candidate, John Rigg, withdrew, Baillie was declared elected.

Hannah Baillie died on 12 November 1919 in Wellington. Captain Baillie died aged 95 at his daughter's residence in Maoribank, Upper Hutt, New Zealand on 24 February 1922. His funeral was held at what is now known as Old St. Paul's in Wellington. The Baillies are buried at Karori Cemetery. Two of his sons had died before him.

== Notes ==
Political offices
Preceded by William Adams	Superintendent of Marlborough Province; 1861–1863	Succeeded by Thomas Carter
Preceded by Mathew Richmond	Chairman of Committees of the Legislative Council; 1879–1902	Succeeded by William Cowper Smith
