= 1858 Wairau by-election =

New Zealand by-election

The Wairau by-election 1858 was a by-election held in the Wairau electorate during the 2nd New Zealand Parliament, on 21 May 1858. The by-election was caused by the resignation of incumbent MP William Wells and was won unopposed by Frederick Weld.
