= 1933 Birthday Honours (New Zealand) =

Awards list for New Zealand

The 1933 King's Birthday Honours in New Zealand, celebrating the official birthday of King George V, were appointments made by the King to various orders and honours to reward and highlight good works by New Zealanders. They were announced on 3 June 1933.

The recipients of honours are displayed here as they were styled before their new honour.

== Knight Bachelor ==
- Hugh Thomas Dyke Acland CMG CBE FRCS – of Christchurch; vice president of the Dominion Council of the Australian College of Surgeons.
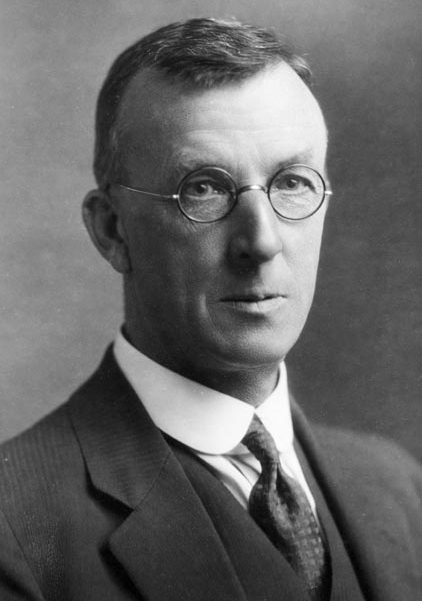
Sir Hugh Acland

== Order of Saint Michael and Saint George ==
=== Companion (CMG) ===
- John Saxon Barton – stipendiary magistrate, Napier. For public services.
- Thomas Lindsay Buick – of Wellington. For public services.
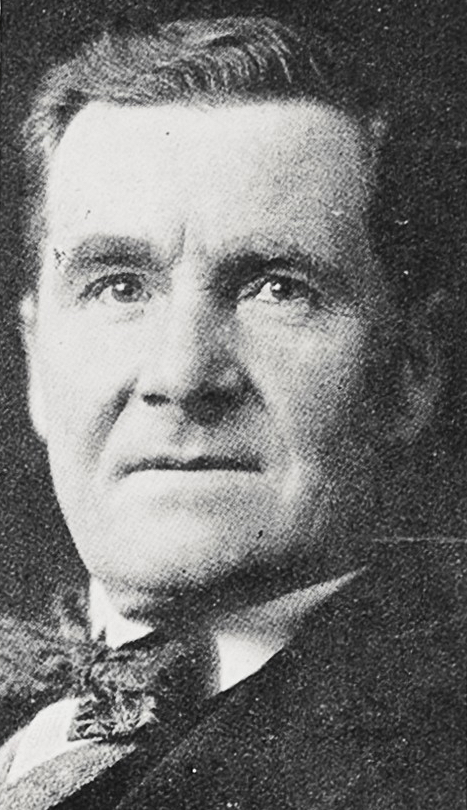
John Barton

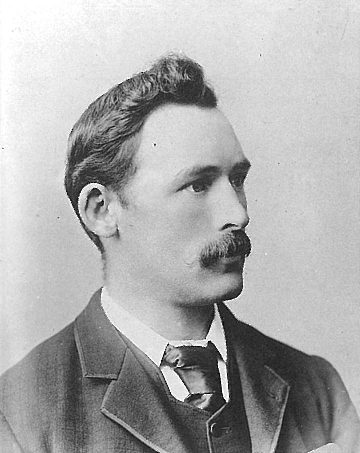
Lindsay Buick

== Order of the British Empire ==
=== Knight Commander (KBE) ===
Civil division

- Colonel Stephen Shepherd Allen CMG DSO* VD – of Morrinsville; formerly administrator of Western Samoa.
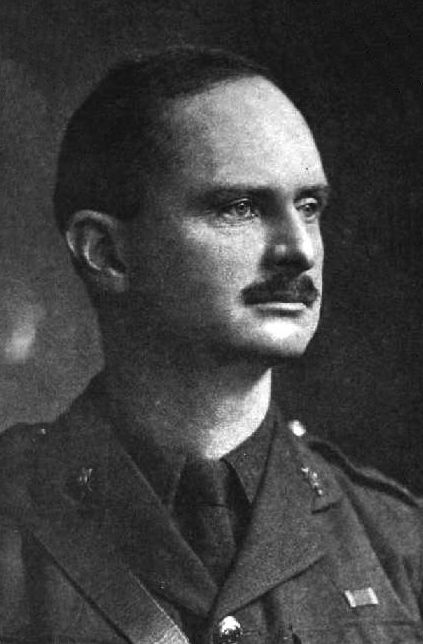
Sir Stephen Allen

=== Officer (OBE) ===
- Makea Nui Tinirau Ariki – of Rarotonga; paramount chief of Cook Island.

== Companion of the Imperial Service Order (ISO) ==
- Theophilus Benjamin Strong MA BSc – lately director of education.
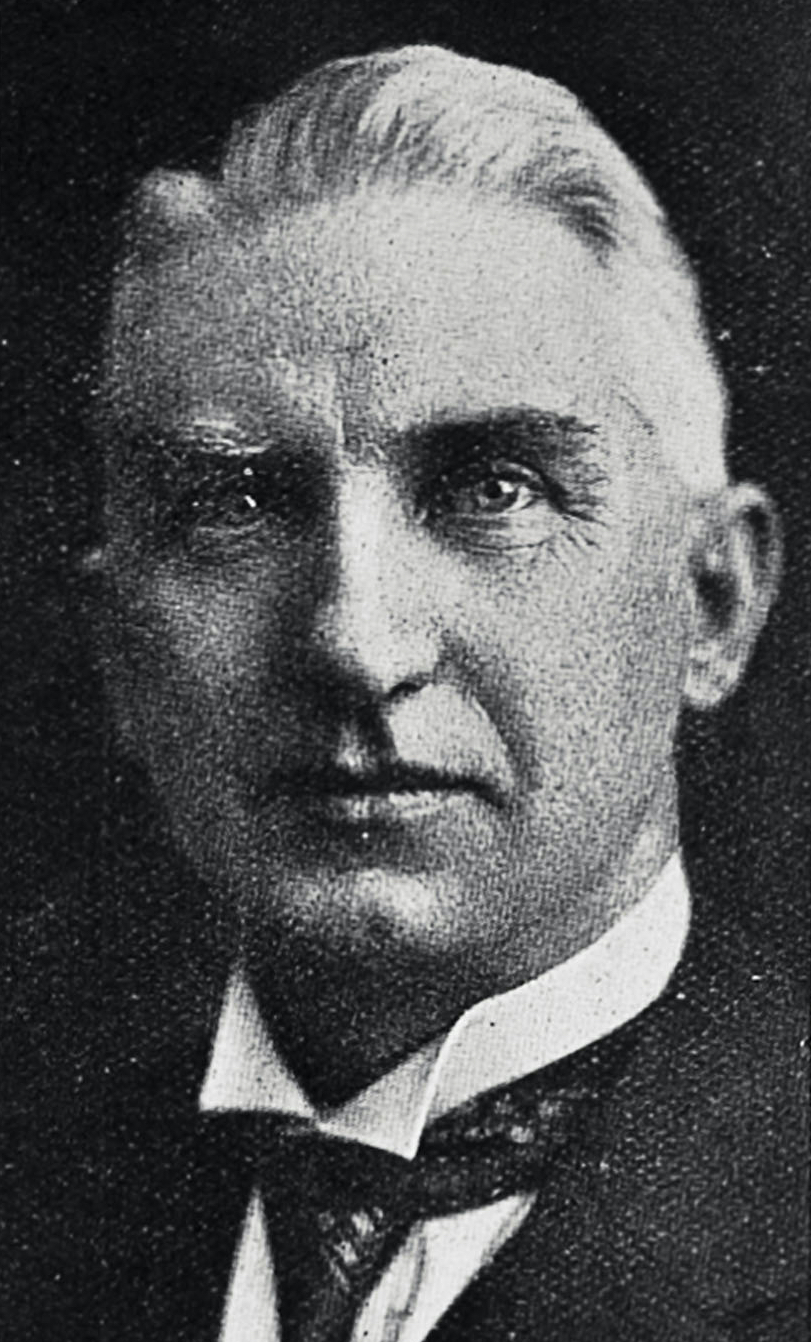
Theophilus Strong
