= William Henry Macey =

New Zealand photographer (1850–1931)

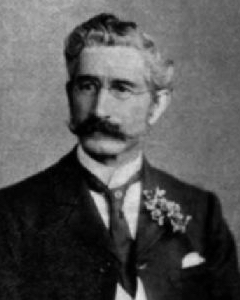
- Mr. William H. Macey

19th Mayor of Blenheim
- In office 1903–1905
- Preceded by: Richard McCallum
- Succeeded by: Edward Henry Penny

Personal details
- Born: 14 April 1850 Islington, London, England
- Died: 30 May 1931 (aged 81) Durie Hill, Whanganui, Manawatū-Whanganui, New Zealand
- Resting place: Aramoho Cemetery

William Henry Macey (14 April 1850 – 30 May 1931) was a photographer who served two terms as mayor of Blenheim, New Zealand.

== Biography ==
Macey was born in 1850 in Islington, London to William and Elizabeth Macey (née Salmon). Arriving in New Zealand in the year 1857, he soon went to Marlborough where he was apprenticed by photographer William Collie.

== Photography ==
Macey's opened his photography studio in Market Place, Blenheim, in 1878, and expanded to Picton and Havelock in 1902. He produced high-end prints, often using silver or gold trim and lettering.
