= Edward Healy =

New Zealand politician

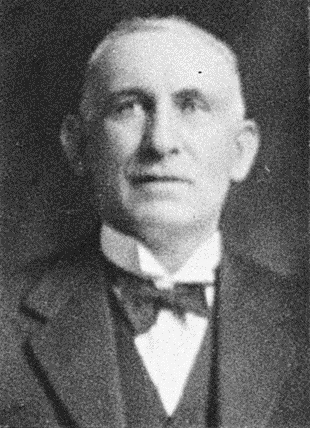

Member of the New Zealand Parliament for Wairau
- In office 14 November 1928 – 1 November 1935
- Preceded by: William Girling
- Succeeded by: Ted Meachen

Personal details
- Born: 28 September 1869 near Blenheim, New Zealand
- Died: 23 August 1954 (aged 84) New Zealand
- Party: United

Edward Francis Healy (28 September 1869 – 23 August 1954) was a United Party Member of Parliament in New Zealand.

== Business interests ==
Healy was born near Blenheim in 1869. He was educated at a state school and initially was a blacksmith for 16 years. He then imported bicycles, and became a stock and station agent, and an auctioneer. He sold his business to Dalgety and worked for them for the next five years. Afterwards, he purchased a sheep and cattle farm, but retired from that venture in 1920.

== Public offices ==
New Zealand Parliament
Years	Term	Electorate	Party
1928–1931	23rd	Wairau	United
1931–1935	24th	Wairau	United

Healy was a member of a number of organisations. He was on the Pelorus Road Board, Wairau Licensing Committee, various school committees in both Canterbury and Marlborough, and the Marlborough Patriotic Committee. At the time of election to the House of Representatives, he was a member of the Wairau Hospital Board.

He won the Wairau electorate in 1928, but was defeated in 1935 by Labour's Ted Meachen. In the 1938 election, Meachen and Healy (this time standing for National) contested the Marlborough electorate, but Meachen was again successful.

From 1930 until 1931 he was the United Party's junior whip.

During the Great Depression, the government stopped work on the Main North Line between Wharanui and Parnassus. A 500-strong protest march by Marlborough residents was led by Healy, and he later crossed the floor in Parliament on the issue.

In 1935, he was awarded the King George V Silver Jubilee Medal.

== Other interests ==
Healy was involved with many sporting codes, including horse racing, trotting, football, bowling, and cycling. He represented Marlborough and Canterbury in rugby union. He held executive positions with the Wairau Valley Racing Club, the Pelorus Hack Racing Club, the Nelson Jockey Club, and the Nelson Trotting Club. In earlier years, he raced horses himself. Later on, he acted as a judge of horses and stock at agricultural shows.

== Family and death ==
Healy married Mary Jane Bishop in 1895. He died on 23 August 1954 and is buried at Tuamarina Cemetery near Blenheim. His wife died in 1966.

== Notes ==
New Zealand Parliament
Preceded by William Girling	Member of Parliament for Wairau; 1928–1935	Succeeded by Ted Meachen
