= John Duncan (New Zealand politician, born 1848) =

New Zealand politician

New Zealand Parliament
Years	Term	Electorate	Party
1908–1909	17th	Wairau	Independent
1909–1911	Changed allegiance to:		Reform

John Duncan (1848 – 2 February 1924) was a Reform Party Member of Parliament in New Zealand.

Born in Dundee, Scotland, in 1848, Duncan emigrated with his family to New Zealand in 1851, and was educated at Nelson College from 1863 to 1864.

He was elected to the Wairau electorate in the 1908 general election, when he defeated former Mayor of Blenheim Robert McArtney. Duncan was defeated in 1911 by Richard McCallum.

He died at Picton on 2 February 1924 and was buried at Picton Cemetery.

New Zealand Parliament
Preceded by Charles H. Mills	Member of Parliament for Wairau; 1908–1911	Succeeded by Richard McCallum
