= Lindsay Buick =

New Zealand politician (1866–1938)

Lindsay Buick CMG
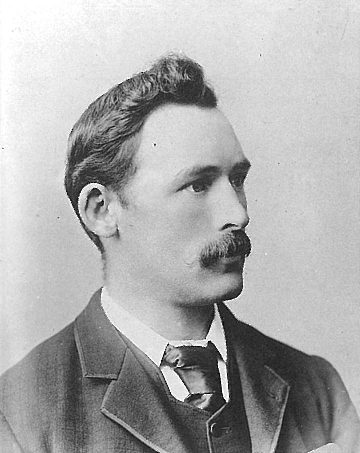
- Buick in the 1890s

Member of the New Zealand Parliament for Wairau
- In office 5 December 1890 – 19 December 1896
- Preceded by: Henry Dodson
- Succeeded by: Charlie Mills

Personal details
- Born: 13 May 1865 Oamaru, New Zealand
- Died: 22 February 1938 (aged 72) Wellington, New Zealand
- Party: Liberal
- Spouse: Mary Fitzgerald (m. 1891)
- Occupation: Journalist

Thomas Lindsay Buick CMG (13 May 1865 – 22 February 1938) was a labour-friendly Liberal Member of Parliament for the Wairau electorate, New Zealand, a journalist and a historian. He published under the name T. Lindsay Buick. He wrote a book about the Treaty of Waitangi, which was the only substantial work about the treaty published prior to the 1980s.

== Biography ==
=== Early life ===
Born in Oamaru on 13 May 1865, Buick was the son of Margaret (née Petrie) and John Walter Buick. His parents had emigrated from England to Port Chalmers in 1860. Buick received his education at schools in Oamaru and moved to Blenheim in 1884 to work as a carpenter. Although he had no relation to Ireland or Catholicism, he joined the Irish National League "purely as a lover of liberty and justice", and in 1889 he embarked on a speaker tour. He was also active in the temperance movement.

Buick married Mary Fitzgerald on 8 January 1891 at Blenheim; they were to have no children.

=== Member of Parliament ===
New Zealand Parliament
Years	Term	Electorate	Party
1890–1893	11th	Wairau	Liberal–Labour
1893–1896	12th	Wairau	Liberal–Labour

Buick represented the Wairau electorate in the New Zealand House of Representatives from 1890 to 1896, when he was defeated. He had a working-class background and won the seat with labour support.

In late-1891 he was appointed the organising secretary of the newly created Liberal Federation, the organisational body governing the Liberal Party, after Thomas Bracken declined the position. Party leader John Ballance thought Buick a "bright, up and coming young man" and gave his endorsement to Buick as well as a salary for this position, funded by a mixture of donations and annual subscriptions. Buick began a tour to organise local Liberal Party committees. Many Liberal associations had been formed already in the lead up to the 1890 election and Buick's principle task was to bring them under centralised control. His secondary task was setting up new branches in areas without one. He first visited Dannevirke, then Napier to sure up branches there before travelling north to Auckland. The Auckland Liberal Association was not as healthy as supposed. Buick spent most of his time convincing Auckland liberals that Ballance was the leader of liberalism in New Zealand, rather than former Premier Sir George Grey. He travelled south to New Plymouth then further south to Wellington. A new Taranaki Liberal Association was formed along the way. In Wellington, local supporters had been able to form an association without his assistance In the South Island he did not visit anywhere other than Christchurch and Dunedin. Associations already existed there, but their overall organisation was weak. Membership numbers grew only slightly which disappointed Ballance and Buick was unable to find any large individual donors.

Buick voted against Ballance's 1892 land bill, alongside many other rural Liberal members, though it still passed despite their dissent. From 1893 until 1894 he was the Liberal Party's junior whip.

The 1896 general election was contested by Buick and Charlie Mills, who received 2014 and 2072 votes, respectively. Mills thus succeeded Buick. After a falling out with Ballance's successor, Richard Seddon, Buick had distanced himself from the Liberal Party and became an Independent Liberal candidate.

Buick moved to Palmerston North in 1897 where he purchased an interest in the liberal leaning Manawatu Standard newspaper, which was owned by parliamentary colleague Frederick Pirani and his brother David. Years later, in July 1904 he unsuccessfully contested Pahiatua by-election as the official Liberal candidate.

=== Journalism career ===
In 1903 he became the owner/publisher of the Dannevirke Advocate. He retained his interest in the paper until 1912, when the Advocate merged together with the Dannevirke Evening News. In 1911 he made an extended visit to England, detailing many of his impressions there in a series of articles in the Advocate. Buick became a member of the United Press Association in Wellington as a parliamentary reporter in 1913. He was promoted to the first assistant in 1917, and from 1918 was the senior parliamentary reporter until he retired in 1933. In 1928 he was the chairman of the press gallery as well as a president of the Wellington Journalists' Union.

=== Honours and awards ===
In the 1933 King's Birthday Honours, Buick was appointed a Companion of the Order of St Michael and St George (CMG), for public services. In 1935, he was awarded the King George V Silver Jubilee Medal.

== Literary work ==
=== Historical work ===
Buick wrote numerous works on the pre-European and early contact history New Zealand, and two books on music. His The Treaty of Waitangi: or, How New Zealand became a British Colony (1916) remained the only substantial work on the Treaty until the late 1980s. As a mostly self-educated man, he began writing and researching by chance, as he had an interest in it, though soon developed a deep commitment to doing as much of it as he could.

=== Published works ===
- Old Marlborough: or, The Story of a Province. Hart and Keeling. 1900.
- Old Manawatu: or, The Wild Days of the West (1903)
- Old New Zealander: or, Te Rauparaha, the Napoleon of the South (1911)
- Letters from Abroad (1914)
- The Treaty of Waitangi: or, How New Zealand became a British Colony (1916)
- New Zealand's First War: or, The Rebellion of Hone Heke (1926)
- Romance of the Gramophone (1927)
- French at Akaroa: An Adventure in Colonization (1928)
- Jubilee of the Port of Wellington, 1880–1930 (1930)
- Mystery of the Moa: New Zealand's Avian Giant (1931)
- British Residency at Waitangi (1932)
- Waitangi: Ninety-four Years After (1934)
- Old British Residency at the Bay of Islands (1934)
- Centenary of a Flag: New Zealand's Old National Ensign (1934)
- Elijah: The Story of Mendelssohn’s Oratorio (1935)
- The Discovery of Dinornis: The Story of a Man, a Bone, and a Bird (1936)
- Moa-Hunters of New Zealand: Sportsmen of the Stone Age (1936)

== Notes ==
New Zealand Parliament
Preceded by Henry Dodson	Member of Parliament for Wairau; 1890–1896	Succeeded by Charlie Mills
