= Frederick John Litchfield =

Mayor of Blenheim

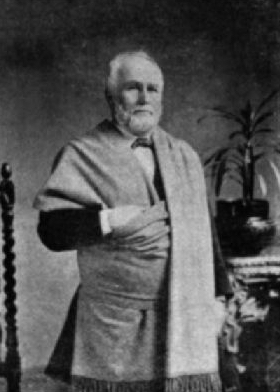
- F. J. Litchfield

1st Mayor of Blenheim
- In office 1869–1870
- Succeeded by: Henry Dodson

Personal details
- Born: 1820 Cambridge, Cambridgeshire, England
- Died: 18 February 1900 (aged 79–80) Blenheim, Marlborough, New Zealand
- Resting place: Omaka Cemetery
- Occupation: Schoolmaster, Proprietor

Frederick John Litchfield was a New Zealand settler who served as the first mayor of Blenheim.

== Biography ==
Frederick was born in 1820 at Cambridge, England, travelling to New Zealand in 1853 where he settled at Motueka and worked as a schoolmaster. By 1858, he was settled at the infant town of Beaver where he worked John Symon's store and ran the Beaver Inn. In June 1869, he was elected as one of nine members of the first Marlborough Borough Council and was elected as their first mayor.

== Personal life ==
Fredrick died at Hastings, South East England on 18 February 1900 at the age of eighty. He was buried at Omaka Cemetery.
