= John Barton (public administrator) =

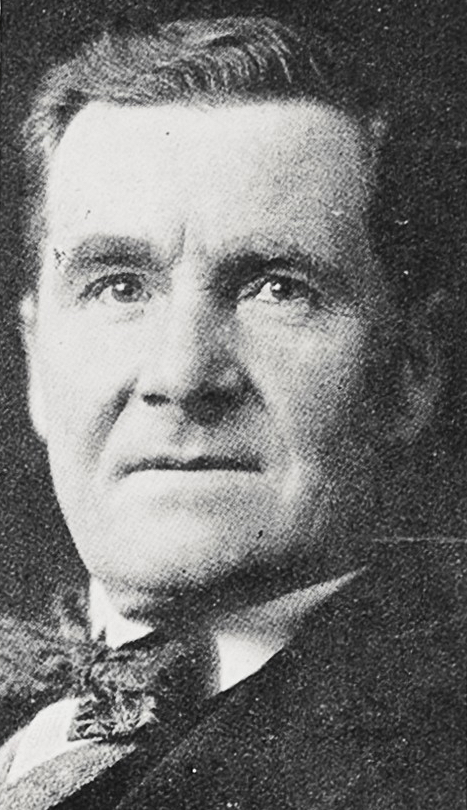
John Barton

John Saxon Barton CMG (13 April 1875 – 2 September 1961) was a New Zealand accountant, writer, lawyer, magistrate and public administrator. He was born in Richmond, Victoria, Australia on 13 April 1875. He was one of the two commissioners put in charge of rebuilding Napier after the 1931 Hawke's Bay earthquake. In the 1933 King's Birthday Honours, Barton was appointed a Companion of the Order of St Michael and St George (CMG) for public services in Napier.

In 1935, he was awarded the King George V Silver Jubilee Medal.
