= Wairau (electorate) =

Wairau was a parliamentary electorate in the Marlborough Region of New Zealand. It was one of the initial 24 New Zealand electorates and existed from 1853 until its abolition in 1938, when it was succeeded by the Marlborough electorate. The electorate had 13 representatives during its existence. The 1861 election in the Wairau electorate was notable in that a later Premier, Frederick Weld, was unexpectedly and narrowly defeated by William Henry Eyes.

== Population centres ==
The New Zealand Constitution Act 1852, passed by the British government, allowed New Zealand to establish a representative government. The initial 24 New Zealand electorates were defined by Governor George Grey in March 1853. Wairau was one of the initial single-member electorates.

The initial area covered the Marlborough Sounds in the north to the Hurunui River in the south. Settlements within that area were Picton, Blenheim, and Kaikōura.

The Constitution Act also allowed the House of Representatives to establish new electorates, and this was first done in 1858, when four new electorates were formed by splitting existing electorates. The Cheviot electorate was formed by taking area from the Wairau and Christchurch Country electorates.

The Wairau electorate's boundaries were constantly adjusted over the years, but the electorate always covered a large, rural area around the Awatere River, with a long coastal boundary south of Cape Campbell, at times as far south as Kaikōura. Blenheim was always included in the electorate, but Picton not always. The 1918 electoral redistribution, which applied from the 1919 election, changed the shape of the electorate significantly, with it moving away from the Pacific Ocean coast to make way for the Hurunui electorate moving north. Wairau gained large areas of land south of Richmond. It also covered the Marlborough Sounds, and Blenheim was the southernmost point along the coast. The 1922 electoral redistribution reversed this and Wairau moved back to its traditional area. Wairau was abolished through the 1937 electoral redistribution, which came into effect with the 1938 election, and replaced by the Marlborough electorate, which had more or less the same shape as Wairau had had since the 1927 electoral redistribution.

== History ==
Wairau was one of the original electorates for the first general election in 1853. Frederick Weld was declared elected unopposed at the nomination meeting on 2 August 1853. Weld resigned in June 1855 to return to England, but as the next election was to be held within a few months, this did not cause a by-election. The nomination for the 1855 election was set for 19 November, and this is the date recorded in the standard reference book, the New Zealand Parliamentary Record, 1840–1984, for the election of William Wells, but that election did not happen. The mail did not reach the Wairau Valley in time, and the electors did not know about the election. The new date for the nomination meeting was set as 6 December. Wells was one of many members of the House of Representatives who resigned in early 1858; he placed a public notice to that effect in the 20 March edition of The Nelson Examiner. At the opening of the second session of the 2nd Parliament on 10 April 1858, the speaker read out 14 resignations, including that of Wells. Weld had returned from England by then and agreed to be a candidate at the by-election, and Alfred Saunders received an acquisition and also agreed to stand. On nomination day, only Weld's name was put forward, who was thus declared elected unopposed.

The New Zealand Constitution Act 1852 gave Parliament the power to establish new electorates, and this was first used later in 1858 when four new electorates were created. This also affected the Wairau electorate, which was combined with the Christchurch Country electorate and then redivided, and the Cheviot electorate was established through this process. The 1859 supplementary election returned Edward Jollie for the Cheviot electorate.

In the 1861 election, Weld was challenged by William Henry Eyes, with Eyes winning by a four-vote margin (65 votes to 61). Weld stood two weeks later in the Cheviot electorate, where he decisively beat Charles Hunter Brown. At the 1866 election, Eyes was returned unopposed; the previous year, he had been chosen Superintendent of Marlborough Province. In 1871, Eyes was challenged by Henry Redwood but remained the preferred representative by the voters. In December 1871, Eyes was appointed Crown Lands Commissioner for the Marlborough Province and as a public servant, he could no longer hold a seat in parliament and had to resign. The resulting 1872 by-election was contested by Arthur Seymour and Joseph Ward, with Seymour the successful candidate. Seymour remained a member of the General Assembly until his resignation in 1875 prior to a trip to England. The resulting 1875 by-election was won by Ward, who defeated William Sefton Moorhouse. Seymour returned from England just prior to the 1876 election. George Henderson, a former Mayor of Blenheim, became a candidate in the Wairau electorate whilst Ward announced that he would stand in the Cheviot electorate instead. Seymour won the election in the Wairau electorate with 201 votes to 179 for Henderson. Ward was beaten in the Cheviot electorate by Leonard Harper. Henderson and Seymour both contested the 1879 election, with Seymour again confirmed by the voters.

In the 1881 election, Seymour was beaten by Henry Dodson, a former member of the Marlborough Provincial Council and a former Mayor of Blenheim. In 1884, Dodson defeated Joseph Ward. The 1887 election saw a three-way contest, with Dodson challenged by George Henderson and Sutherland John Macalister. Dodson won the election; this was Henderson's third attempt to become the Wairau electorate's representative. Dodson retired in 1890, and three candidates put their name forward: Lindsay Buick, Arthur Seymour, and Sutherland John Macalister. Buick, a journalist and historian, won the election. The Liberal Party was founded after the 1890 election and when it came to the 1893, Buick as incumbent and the barrister William Sinclair both stood for the Liberal Party, whilst the sheep farmer John Duncan ran as an independent. Buick won the election with an increased majority.

In the 1896 electoral redistribution, the neighbouring Waimea-Sounds electorate was abolished, and its area distributed to the Motueka, City of Nelson, and Wairau electorates. The incumbent of the Waimea-Sounds electorate, Charlie Mills, lived in Havelock, and whilst the town was just within the City of Nelson electorate, most of Mills' traditional constituency was located within the Wairau electorate, and he thus challenged Wairau's incumbent, Buick, in the 1896 election. Buick and Mills received 2014 and 2072 votes, respectively, and Mills thus succeeded Buick in Wairau. The 1896 election was "one of the hardest fought contests" in the Wairau electorate up to that point. In the 1899 election, Mills was challenged by Walter Clifford, but Mills remained the preferred candidate by a greatly increased margin.

=== Members of Parliament ===
Key

Independent Liberal–Labour Liberal Conservative Reform United Labour

Election	Winner
1853 election	Frederick Weld
1855 election	William Wells
1858 by-election	Frederick Weld
1861 election	William Henry Eyes
1866 election	William Henry Eyes
1871 election	William Henry Eyes
1872 by-election	Arthur Seymour
1875 by-election	Joseph Ward
1876 election	Arthur Seymour
1879 election	Arthur Seymour
1881 election	Henry Dodson
1884 election	Henry Dodson
1887 election	Henry Dodson
1890 election	Lindsay Buick
1893 election	Lindsay Buick
1896 election	Charlie Mills
1899 election	Charlie Mills
1902 election	Charlie Mills
1905 election	Charlie Mills
1908 election	John Duncan
1911 election	Richard McCallum
1914 election	Richard McCallum
1919 election	Richard McCallum
1922 election	William Girling
1925 election	William Girling
1928 election	Edward Healy
1931 election	Edward Healy
1935 election	Ted Meachen
(Electorate abolished in 1938, see Marlborough)

== Election results ==
=== 1935 election ===
1935 general election: Wairau
Party	Candidate	Votes	%	±%
Labour	Ted Meachen	3,790	37.57	+17.23
United	Edward Healy	3,438	34.08	−13.30
Democrat	Malcolm McKenzie	2,640	26.17	
Independent	Mark Grace	219	2.17	
Informal votes		54	0.53	+0.21
Majority		352	3.48	
Turnout		10,087	93.71	+4.32
Registered electors		10,763		

=== 1931 election ===
1931 general election: Wairau
Party	Candidate	Votes	%	±%
United	Edward Healy	4,467	47.38	−4.20
Independent	William Girling	3,043	32.28	−16.14
Labour	Ted Meachen	1,918	20.34	
Informal votes		30	0.32	−0.44
Majority		1,424	15.10	+11.94
Turnout		9,458	89.39	−1.21
Registered electors		10,581		

=== 1928 election ===
1928 general election: Wairau
Party	Candidate	Votes	%	±%
United	Edward Healy	4,759	51.58	
Reform	William Girling	4,467	48.42	
Informal votes		70	0.75	
Majority		292	3.16	
Turnout		9,296	90.60	
Registered electors		10,261		

=== 1914 election ===
1914 general election: Wairau
Party	Candidate	Votes	%	±%
Liberal	Richard McCallum	3,517	52.57	
Reform	John Duncan	3,148	47.05	
Labour	George Turner	25	0.37	
Informal votes		109	1.62	
Majority		369	5.51	
Turnout		6,690	86.81	
Registered electors		7,706		

=== 1899 election ===
1899 general election: Wairau
Party	Candidate	Votes	%	±%
Liberal	Charlie Mills	2,786	66.35	+15.64
Conservative	Sir Walter Clifford	1,413	33.65	
Majority		1,373	32.70	+31.28
Turnout		4,199	76.65	−22.07
Registered electors		5,478		

=== 1896 election ===
1896 general election: Wairau
Party	Candidate	Votes	%	±%
Liberal	Charlie Mills	2,072	50.71	
Independent Liberal	Lindsay Buick	2,014	49.29	+3.88
Majority		58	1.42	−8.56
Turnout		4,086	98.72	+20.78
Registered electors		4,139		

=== 1893 election ===
1893 general election: Wairau
Party	Candidate	Votes	%	±%
Liberal–Labour	Lindsay Buick	1,465	45.41	+5.52
Liberal	William Sinclair	1,143	35.43	
Conservative	John Duncan	618	19.16	
Majority		322	9.98	+5.67
Turnout		3,226	77.94	+11.04
Registered electors		4,139		

=== 1890 election ===
1890 general election: Wairau
Party	Candidate	Votes	%	±%
Liberal–Labour	Lindsay Buick	712	39.89	
Conservative	Arthur Seymour	635	35.57	
Liberal	Sutherland John Macalister	438	24.54	−1.58
Majority		77	4.31	−0.61
Turnout		1,785	66.90	−8.63
Registered electors		2,668		

=== 1887 election ===
1887 general election: Wairau
Party	Candidate	Votes	%	±%
Independent	Henry Dodson	528	39.40	−22.00
Independent	George Henderson	462	34.48	
Independent	Sutherland John Macalister	350	26.12	
Majority		66	4.93	−17.89
Turnout		1,340	75.54	+3.48
Registered electors		1,774		

=== 1884 election ===
1884 general election: Wairau
Party	Candidate	Votes	%	±%
Independent	Henry Dodson	638	61.41	+2.33
Independent	Joseph Ward	401	38.59	
Majority		237	22.81	+4.66
Turnout		1,039	72.05	−11.22
Registered electors		1,442		

=== 1881 election ===
1881 general election: Wairau
Party	Candidate	Votes	%	±%
Independent	Henry Dodson	550	59.08	
Independent	Arthur Seymour	381	40.92	−11.77
Majority		169	18.15	+12.77
Turnout		931	83.27	+7.12
Registered electors		1,118		

=== 1879 election ===
1879 general election: Wairau
Party	Candidate	Votes	%	±%
Independent	Arthur Seymour	313	52.69	−0.20
Independent	George Henderson	281	47.31	+0.20
Majority		32	5.39	−0.40
Turnout		594	76.15	+1.50
Registered electors		780		

=== 1876 election ===
1876 general election: Wairau
Party	Candidate	Votes	%	±%
Independent	Arthur Seymour	201	52.89	
Independent	George Henderson	179	47.11	
Majority		22	5.79	−0.81
Turnout		380	74.66	−20.38
Registered electors		509		

=== 1875 by-election ===
1875 Wairau by-election
Party	Candidate	Votes	%	±%
Independent	Joseph Ward	202	53.30	+10.19
Independent	William Sefton Moorhouse	177	46.70	
Majority		25	6.60	−7.18
Informal votes		4	1.04	
Turnout		379	94.04	+30.16
Registered electors		403		

=== 1872 by-election ===
1872 Wairau by-election
Party	Candidate	Votes	%	±%
Independent	Arthur Seymour	161	56.89	
Independent	Joseph Ward	122	43.11	
Majority		39	13.78	
Turnout		283	63.88	
Registered electors		443		

=== 1871 election ===
1871 general election: Wairau
Party	Candidate	Votes	%	±%
Independent	William Henry Eyes	102	61.82	
Independent	Henry Redwood	63	38.18	
Majority		39	23.64	
Turnout		165	37.25	
Registered electors		443		

=== 1861 election ===
1861 general election: Wairau
Party	Candidate	Votes	%	±%
Independent	William Henry Eyes	65	51.59	
Independent	Frederick Weld	61	48.41	
Majority		4	3.17	
Turnout		126	45.00	
Registered electors		280		
