= Ōnahau River =

River in Tasman District, New Zealand

- Route of the Ōnahau River
- Mouth of the Ōnahau River Ōnahau River (South Island)

Location
- Country: New Zealand

Physical characteristics
- Source
  - coordinates: 40°50′15″S 172°42′48″E
- Mouth
  - location: Golden Bay / Mohua
  - coordinates: 40°48′03″S 172°46′25″E
- Length: 8 kilometres (5.0 mi)

Basin features
- Progression: Ōnahau River → Golden Bay / Mohua → Tasman Sea
- Tributaries
  - right: Little Ōnahau River

The Ōnahau River is a river of the Tasman Region of New Zealand's South Island. It has its sources close to the track in Kahurangi National Park that follows a ridgeline to Parapara Peak. From here, it flows northeast to reach Golden Bay via a little estuary just east of Rangihaeata. The Little Ōnahau River follows a roughly parallel course to the southwest of the Ōnahau River and has its confluence upstream from the estuary. Upstream from the confluence, both these rivers are crossed by State Highway 60.

== See also ==
- List of rivers of New Zealand
