= Richard McCallum (politician) =

New Zealand politician

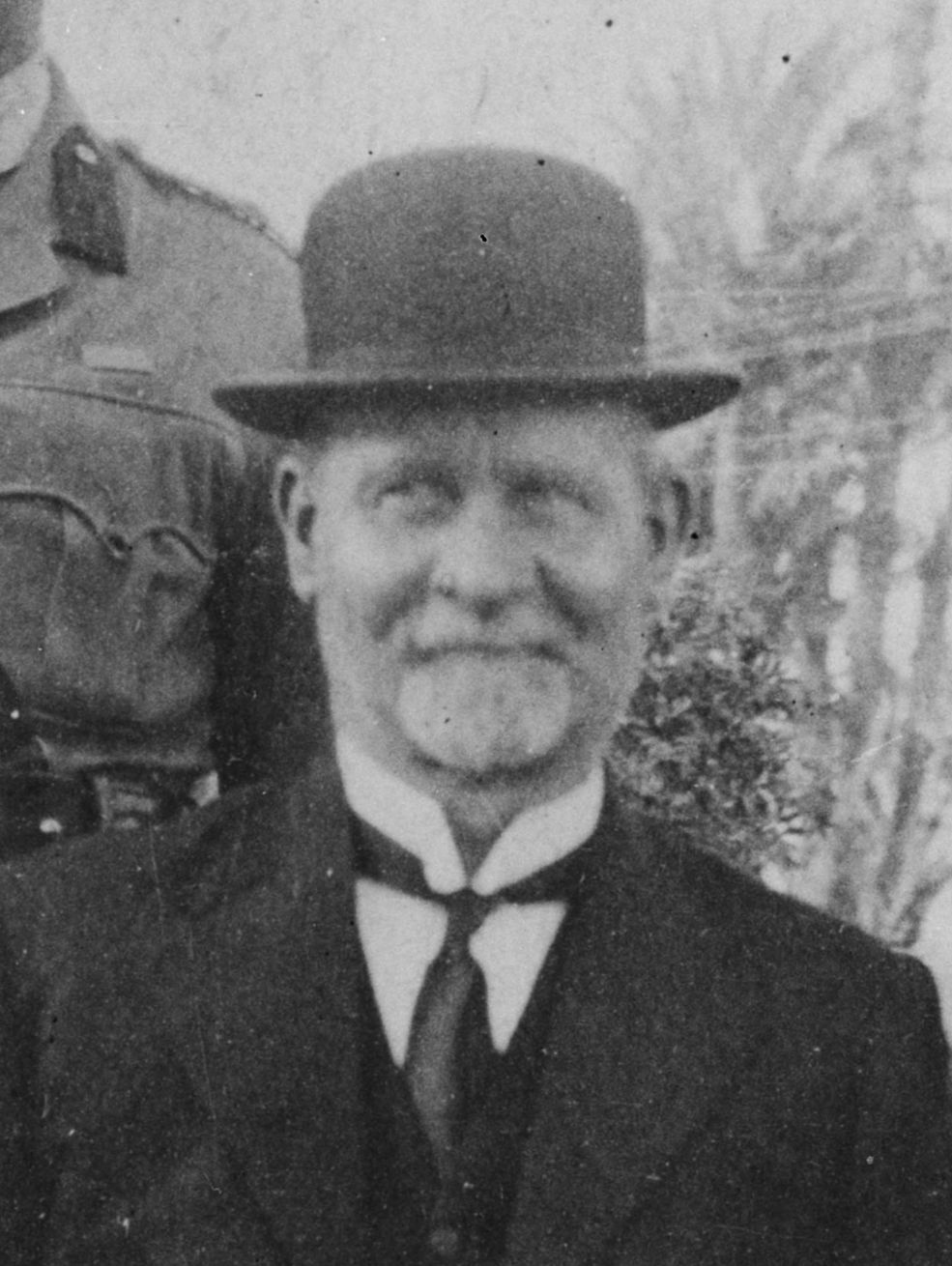
- Richard McCallum during his time as an MP

Mayor of Blenheim
- Preceded by: Robert McArtney
- Succeeded by: William Henry Macey

Personal details
- Born: 1 August 1863
- Died: 1 February 1940 (aged 76)
- Resting place: Omaka Cemetery

Richard McCallum (1 August 1863 – 1 February 1940) was a Liberal Party Member of Parliament in New Zealand, and later a member of the Legislative Council. A barrister from Blenheim, he held many local positions, including two years as Mayor of Blenheim. One of his main interests was the advancement of education.

== Early life ==
McCallum was born in 1863 near Blenheim. He was the son of Archibald McCallum (1829–1905) from Glasgow, Scotland, who came to New Zealand in 1855 after a year in Victoria, Australia. Richard McCallum had four brothers and four sisters. He received his education at schools in Blenheim and Renwick.

McCallum married Winifred Grady from Wellington on 15 September 1892 at the Terrace Congregational Church (located on the corner of Lambton Quay and Bowen Street) in Wellington. Although a large church, some 200 people could not get access to it due to overcrowding. His wife was a popular singer known beyond the Wellington region. Their honeymoon took them to the Hot Lakes district, Napier, Auckland, Sydney, Melbourne, Hobart, and Adelaide.

== Professional career ==
By age 21, he passed his exam as a barrister and became a clerk with W. Sinclair, the Crown Solicitor for Marlborough. After passing his final exam in 1885, he entered into a partnership with Sinclair. From 1899, McCallum had his own practice, often with others as partners. Major clients included the National Bank, and the Bank of New South Wales.

== Political career ==
New Zealand Parliament
Years	Term	Electorate	Party
1911–1914	18th	Wairau	Liberal
1914–1919	19th	Wairau	Liberal
1919–1922	20th	Wairau	Liberal

McCallum was Mayor of Blenheim in 1901–1903. He also served on the town council as a councillor. He served on other local bodies, including the Marlborough Education Board, and the Wairau Hospital and Charitable Aid Board, and the Lower Wairau River Board. He was on the Board of Governors of Marlborough College until 1939, and was on the Victoria University College Council.

In the 1911 election, McCallum successfully contested the Wairau electorate for the Liberal Party, defeating the incumbent, John Duncan of the Reform Party. McCallum was re-elected in 1914 and 1919, but was defeated in the 1922 election by Reform's William Girling. One of his main interests was education, and was a member of Parliament's Education Committee.

On 11 June 1930, he was appointed to the Legislative Council. He served for one term until 10 June 1937.

== Death ==
He died on 1 February 1940 at Blenheim, and was buried at Omaka Cemetery. He was survived by his widow and a son.

== Notes ==
New Zealand Parliament
Preceded by John Duncan	Member of Parliament for Wairau; 1911–1922	Succeeded by William Girling
