= Courtney Kenny (New Zealand politician) =

New Zealand politician

New Zealand Parliament
Years	Term	Electorate	Party
1868–1870	4th	Picton	Independent
1871–1875	5th	Picton	Independent
1876–1879	6th	Picton	Independent
1879–1881	7th	Picton	Independent

Courtney William Alymer Thomas Kenny (Note: His name is spelt 'Courtenay' in his 1856 Scottish marriage (494/00010) and New Zealand death (1905/7708) registrations. He used also the spelling ‘Courtney’, such as in an 1868 mortgage to the NZ Trust and Loan Company.) (25 December 1835 – 12 December 1905) was a 19th-century Member of Parliament from the Marlborough Region, New Zealand.

Kenny and his wife (Georgina Paulina Edith Kenny, 1835–1899) are reported to have arrived in Port Nicholson on the Philip Laing on 23 December 1856 and to have established and named the Lochmara Run in Queen Charlotte Sound, centred on Double Cove and what was to become Lochmara Bay in 1857. They later farmed ‘The Rocks’ in Double Cove, until their deaths.

Kenny is reported to have been born in India, probably Moulmein (now in Burma), to an Indian army officer. His wife was born in Geilston, Dumbarton, Scotland, also to an Indian army father. Both were educated in England.

Kenny, having risen from ensign to captain in the 88th (Connaught Rangers) Regiment of Foot, served in Crimea and then exchanged to the 94th (Scotch) Regiment. He was founding Captain of the Marlborough Volunteers 1860–61 and Marlborough Commissioner of Crown Lands 1862–66, then represented the Picton electorate from an 1868 by-election till 1881, when he retired. He was appointed to the New Zealand Legislative Council on 15 May 1885 and served until his death on 12 December 1905.

== Notes ==
New Zealand Parliament
Preceded by William Adams	Member of Parliament for Picton; 1868–1881	Succeeded by Edward Conolly
