= Mayor of Blenheim =

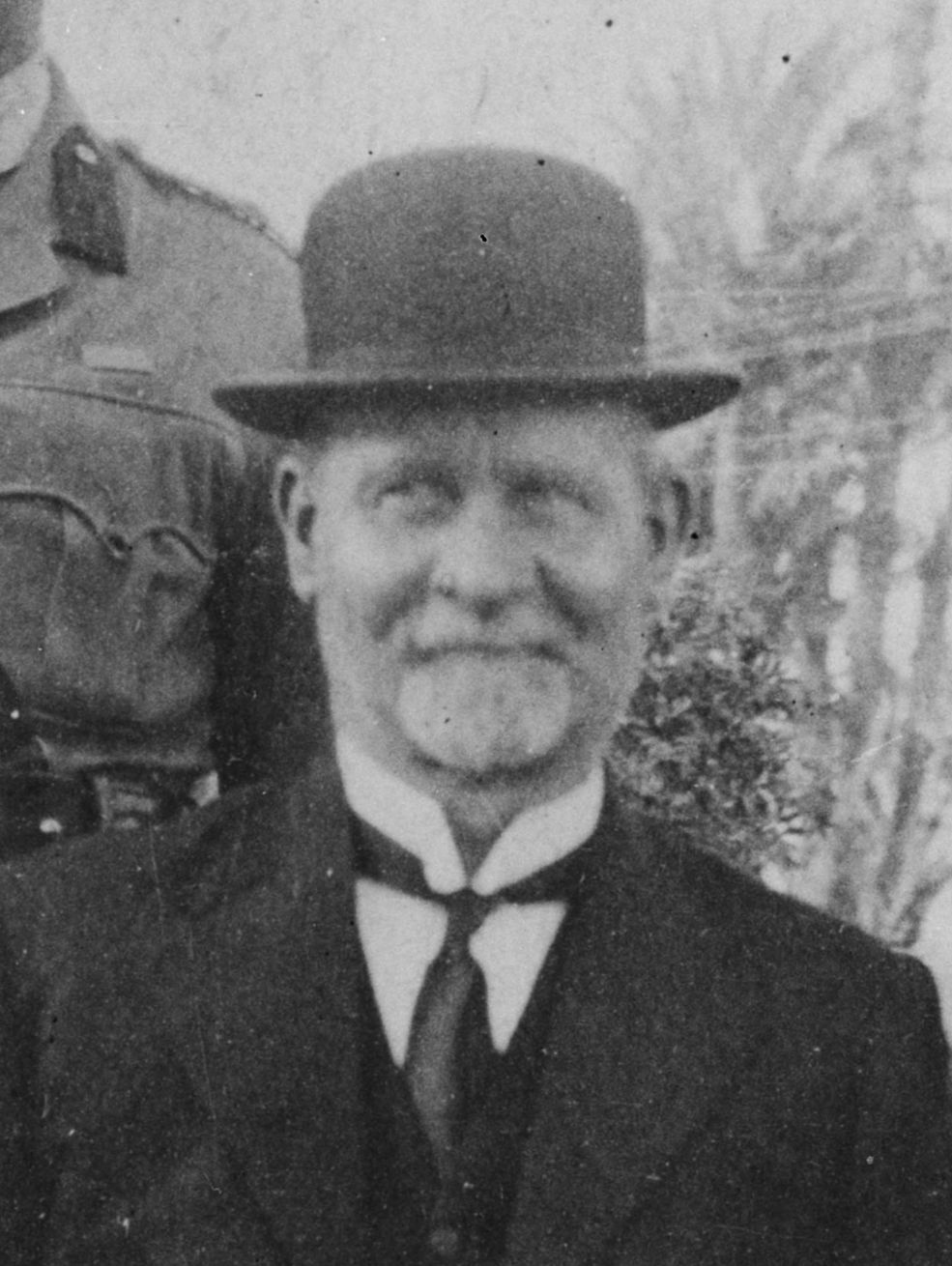
Richard McCallum, 16th Mayor of Blenheim (1901–1903)

The mayor of Blenheim officiated over the borough of Blenheim, New Zealand. The office was created in 1869 when Blenheim became a borough, and ceased with the 1989 local government reforms, when Blenheim Borough was amalgamated with Picton Borough and Marlborough County Council to form Marlborough District. There were 31 mayors of Blenheim. The last mayor of Blenheim, Leo McKendry, was elected as the first mayor of Marlborough.

== History ==
Marlborough was constituted a borough on 6 March 1869. The inaugural borough council was elected on 15 May 1869 and Frederick John Litchfield (1820–1902) became the first mayor in 1869.

Henry Dodson succeeded Litchfield in 1870 and initially served two one-year terms. He served another two terms in 1883–1884. Concurrently, Dodson represented the Wairau electorate in Parliament from 1881 to 1890. The third mayor was George Henderson, who served a total of four terms (1872–1873 and 1885–1886).

John M. Hutcheson (1816–1899) succeeded Henderson as the fourth mayor in 1874. Hutcheson was succeeded by James Edward Hodson, who served two terms (1875–1876). Hodson was a Freemason and died in 1898.

George Fell was mayor from 1877 to 1879. His father, Alfred Fell, was a prominent early settler in Nelson. Fell was succeeded by Frederick Thomas Farmar, who was mayor from 1880 to 1882. Farmar was succeeded by Dodson and Henderson, who had both first been mayors in the 1870s. William Douslin succeeded Henderson in 1887 and he served one term.

George Riley (died 1893) was mayor in 1888 and 1889. The next mayoral election was held on 27 November 1889, and was contested by two councillors, George Houldsworth and Elijah Bythell. Houldsworth had a majority of one vote (93 votes to 92), was declared elected, and installed on 18 December 1889. Houldsworth (1839–1921) was born in Halifax, West Yorkshire, and was mayor for two terms until 1891. Bythell (1842–1894) was elected as the next mayor, and he also served for two terms (1892–1893). Bythell was born in Heaton Mersey near Manchester and he came to Blenheim in 1864. The next mayor was Thomas Horton, who served from 1894 to 1897. A banker by trade, he had previously been a member of the Legislative Council of Fiji and the country's Colonial Treasurer. Horton died in Blenheim in 1919, aged 83.

Horton was defeated on 24 November 1897 by Edward Purser (died 1917) by 119 votes to 115. Purser was installed on 15 December 1897. After his mayoralty, Purser moved to Wanganui where he established a furniture making business. The next mayor was John Grey Trevor, who held the title for the year 1899. Born in Walsoken, he was a descendant of Robert Hampden-Trevor, 1st Viscount Hampden.

Robert McArtney was mayor in the years 1900–1901 for a total of sixteen months. After 17 continuous years on council, he retired in April 1901. He contested the 1908 election in the Wairau electorate, but was defeated by John Duncan. McArtney was succeeded by Richard McCallum (1863–1940), who was elected unopposed on 16 April 1901. McCallum served as mayor from 1901 to 1903 for two terms. McCallum later represented the Wairau electorate in Parliament from 1911 to 1922, and was from 1930 to 1937 a member of the Legislative Council. The 29 April 1903 election was contested by William Henry Macey and William Carr, with Macey gaining 291 votes to 287. Macey (born 1850) served as mayor in 1903–1905 for two terms. Macey was a photographer who had come to New Zealand from Islington in London at the age of seven.

The next mayoral elections were held on 26 April 1905. Two sitting councillors, Edward Henry Penny and James B. Green contested the position, which was won by Penny with 290 votes to 268. Penny was re-elected unopposed in April 2006. The next elections were held on 24 April 1907. The incumbent sought another term, and was challenged by Archibald (Archie) McCallum and John James Winsbury White. McCallum was successful, with 335 votes against 248 votes for Penny, and 189 votes for White. McCallum and Penny contested the next election on 29 April 1908, and McCallum was confirmed for another year with 360 votes to 336. On 28 April 1909, McCallum was challenged by John Conolly, but McCallum maintained a majority of 462 votes to 322.

On 27 April 1910, two previous candidates contested the mayoralty, Edward Henry Penny and John James Winsbury White. Penny was successful, receiving 393 votes to 373. For the 1911 mayoral elections, two challengers to the incumbent came forward in William Carr and White as a former candidate. White withdrew before the election on 26 April 1911, and Penny beat Carr by 713 votes to 635.

The election on 24 April 1912 was contested by three candidates: Christopher James Whitney Griffiths (a former councillor), John Joseph Corry, and White. Corry was successful and obtained 612 votes compared to 435 for Whitney and 295 for White. Corry contested the next election on 30 April 1913 and was challenged by councillor Edward Stone Parker, with the latter defeating the incumbent by 837 votes to 791. Parker and Corry also contested a mayoral election on 29 April 1914, with Arthur Wiffen joining the contest. On this occasion, Corry beat Parker with 852 votes to 727, with Wiffen receiving 34 votes. Corry was re-elected on 28 April 1915 against William Carr. This was the first time that biennial elections were held.

William Carr once again contested a mayoral election and challenged the incumbent on 25 April 1915, but Corry received 721 votes to 457 for Carr. In the next mayoral election on 30 April 1919, Corry was challenged by Richard McCallum, who had been mayor for two terms just after the turn of the century, and who had represented the Wairau electorate in Parliament since the 1911 election. Due to his work towards achieving subscriptions to patriotic funds during World War I, Corry was very popular and polled 834 votes to 518. Corry in turn challenged McCallum in the Wairau electorate later in 1919, but was unsuccessful and came third in the four-person contest. Corry did not contest the 1921 mayoral election, but left for a trip to England instead with his wife. The election in late April 1921 was won by Edward Stone Parker, who had previously been mayor in 1913–1914. The next mayoral election in late April 1923 was once again contested by William Carr, who challenged the incumbent Parker, with Parker being successful. In 1925 the previous deputy mayor, Malcolm McKenzie, was elected mayor unopposed. McKenzie remained mayor until 1935.

1935 saw the beginning of triennial elections. John Stevenson (646 votes) won the three-person contest against Christopher Timothy "Tim" Smith (524 votes) and Bernard J. Cooke. Stevenson served for one term. The 1938 mayoral election was contested by Smith, Labour Party member C. R. Garside, and McMurtry, with Smith beating Garside and McMurtry coming third. Smith served as mayor until 1945. Subsequent mayors were William Girling (1945–1950), Bert Mitchell (1950–1953), Edwin Purcell "Ted" Meachen (1953–1962), Sid Harling (1962–1977), Claude Bertram Whitehead (1977–1982), Philip Taylor (1982–1986), and Leo McKendry (1986–1989). Harling first contested the mayoralty in 1959, and he was successful at his second attempt. He died in office in 1977, and is credited with having been instrumental in implementing the Roll-on/roll-off ferry service operating across the Cook Strait; the GMV Aramoana was the first such ferry that was introduced.

McKendry was the borough's last mayor, as the 1989 local government reform resulted in the amalgamation of Blenheim Borough, Picton Borough, and Marlborough County Council to form Marlborough District. McKendry was elected as the first Mayor of Marlborough.

== List of mayors of Blenheim ==
The following list shows the mayors of Blenheim:

	Name	Portrait	Term
1	Frederick John Litchfield		1869
2	Henry Dodson		1870–1871
3	George Henderson		1872–1873
4	John M. Hutcheson		1874
5	James Edward Hodson		1875–1876
6	George Fell		1877–1879
7	Frederick Thomas Farmar		1880–1882
(2)	Henry Dodson 2nd time		1883–1884
(3)	George Henderson 2nd time		1885–1886
8	William Douslin		1887
9	George Riley		1888–1889
10	George Houldsworth		1889–1891
11	Elijah Bythell		1892–1893
12	Thomas Horton		1894–1897
13	Edward Purser		1897–1898
14	John Grey Trevor		1899
15	Robert McArtney		1900–1901
16	Richard McCallum		1901–1903
17	William Henry Macey		1903–1905
18	Edward Henry Penny		1905–1907
19	Archie McCallum		1907–1910
(18)	Edward Henry Penny 2nd time		1910–1912
20	John Corry		1912–1913
21	Edward Parker		1913–1914
(20)	John Corry 2nd time		1914–1921
(21)	Edward Parker 2nd time		1921–1925
22	Malcolm McKenzie		1925–1935
23	John Stevenson		1935–1938
24	Tim Smith		1938–1945
25	William Girling		1945–1950
26	Bert Mitchell		1950–1953
27	Ted Meachen		1953–1962
28	Sid Harling		1962–1977
29	Claude Whitehead		1977–1982
30	Philip Taylor		1982–1986
31	Leo McKendry		1986–1989
