= Little Ōnahau River =

River in Tasman District, New Zealand

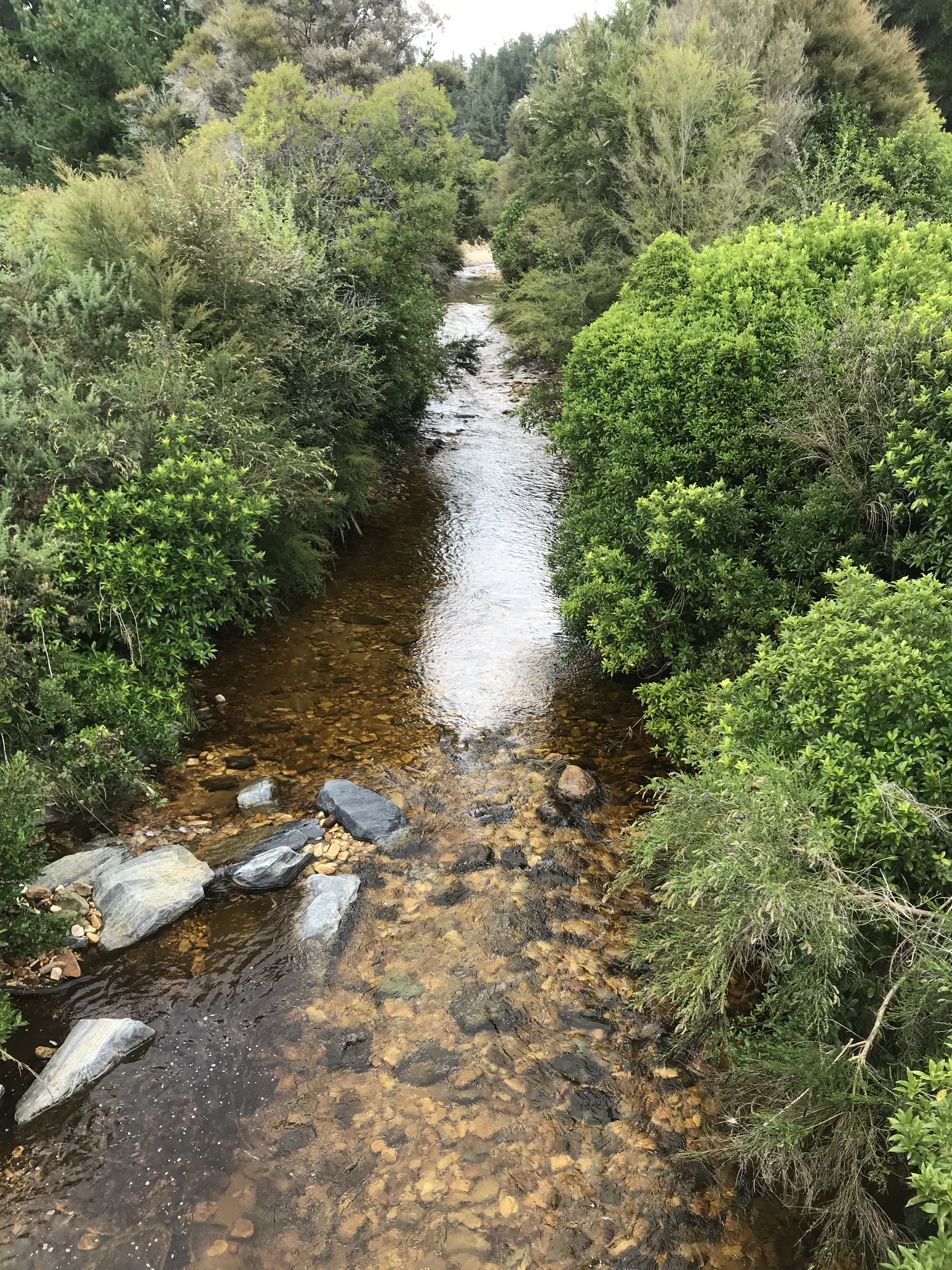
- Little Ōnahau River where it crosses State Highway 60
- Route of the Little Ōnahau River
- Mouth of the Little Ōnahau River Little Ōnahau River (South Island)

Location
- Country: New Zealand

Physical characteristics
- Source
  - location: near the track leading to Parapara Peak
  - coordinates: 40°50′12″S 172°43′12″E
- Mouth
  - location: Ōnahau River
  - coordinates: 40°48′21″S 172°46′15″E
- Length: 9 kilometres (5.6 mi)

Basin features
- Progression: Little Ōnahau River → Ōnahau River → Golden Bay / Mohua → Tasman Sea

The Little Ōnahau River is a river of the northwest of New Zealand's South Island. It has its sources close to the track in Kahurangi National Park that follows a ridgeline to Parapara Peak, near the source of the Ōnahau River. From here, it flows initially southwest and then northwest, passing underneath State Highway 60 just west of the Tākaka Aerodrome. Shortly before reaching the sea, it flows into the Ōnahau River, reaching Golden Bay via a small estuary to the west of Rangihaeata.

== See also ==
- List of rivers of New Zealand
