= Arthur Seymour (politician) =

New Zealand surveyor and politician (1832–1923)

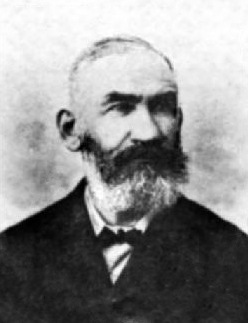
- Arthur Seymour in his late 50s

4th Superintendent of Marlborough Province
- In office 1864–1865
- In office 1870–1876

4th Chairman of Committees
- In office 1873–1875
- Preceded by: Maurice O'Rorke
- Succeeded by: Maurice O'Rorke
- In office 1879–1881
- Preceded by: Maurice O'Rorke
- Succeeded by: Ebenezer Hamlin

Member of the New Zealand Parliament for Wairau
- In office 1872–1875
- Preceded by: William Henry Eyes
- Succeeded by: Joseph Ward
- In office 1876–1881
- Preceded by: Joseph Ward
- Succeeded by: Henry Dodson

Personal details
- Born: 20 March 1832 Marksbury, Somersetshire; England
- Died: 3 April 1923 (aged 91) Picton; New Zealand
- Relations: Dr Ralph Richardson (brother-in-law)

Arthur Penrose Seymour (20 March 1832 – 3 April 1923) was a 19th-century New Zealand politician from Picton. He was the 4th Superintendent of the Marlborough Province and was a member of the provincial government for all 16 years of its existence. With his strong advocacy for Picton, he successfully had the Seat of Government moved to Picton. When the Blenheim party secured a majority in the Provincial Council by 1865, Seymour negotiated the removal of the Seat of Government back to Blenheim.

Seymour was a member of parliament for various Marlborough electorates for a total of twelve years. Prior to his election to Parliament, he had been appointed to the Legislative Council. He was three times Mayor of Picton.

== Early life ==
Seymour was born in 1832 in Marksbury, Somersetshire, England, the fourth son of the Reverend George Turner Seymour & his wife Marianne née Billingsley. He emigrated to New Zealand in 1851 on the Maori, travelling with his sister Marie Louise and her husband, Dr Ralph Richardson. Henry Seymour, who returned from England on the same ship, was unrelated. Arthur Seymour settled in Picton, Marlborough shortly after his arrival. He was a surveyor by profession, but became a runholder in the Awatere Valley. He was appointed a Justice of the peace in 1856. On 23 October 1856, he married Catherine Florence Huddleston at Nelson, the daughter of the Nelson businessman Frederick Huddleston.

== Politics ==
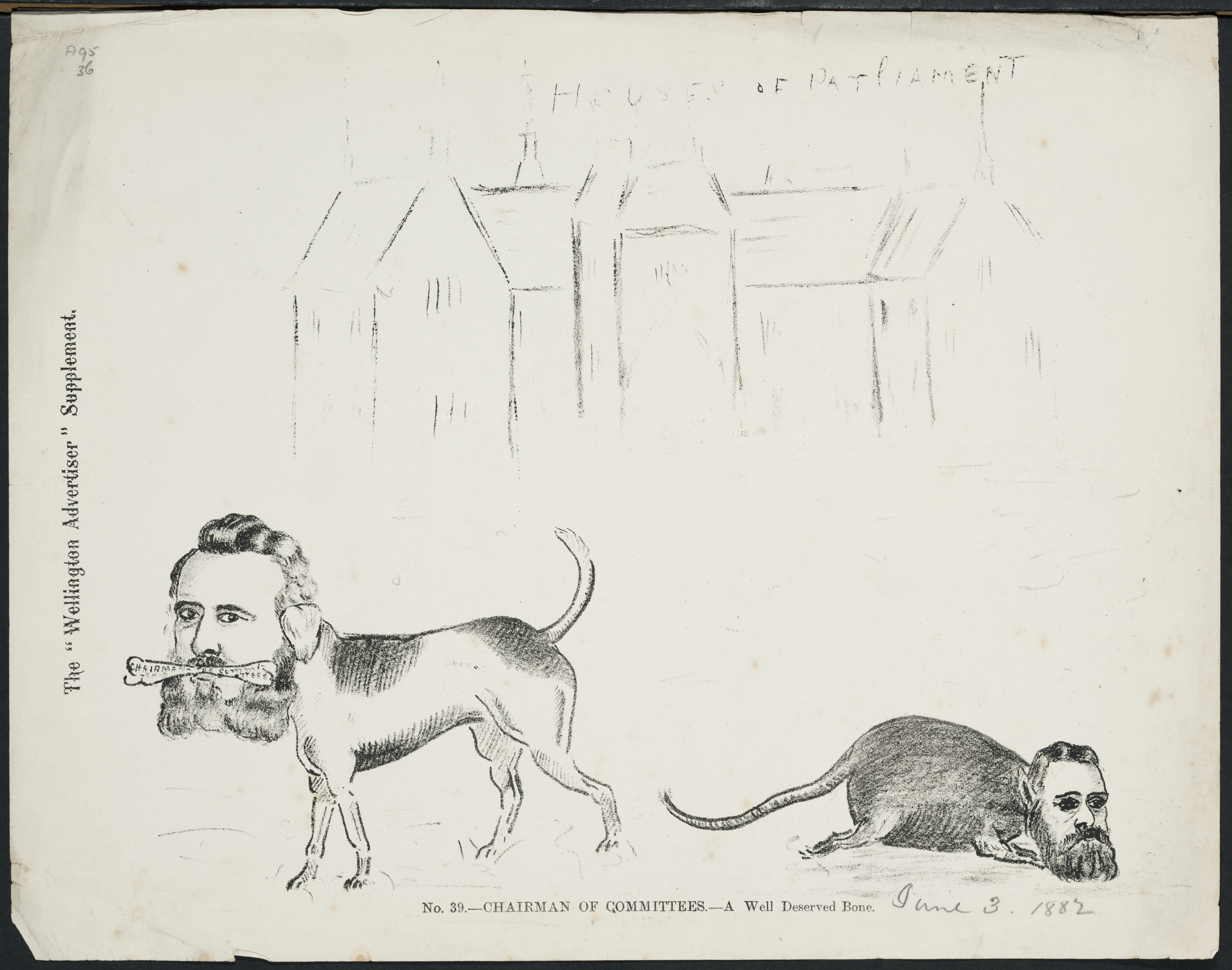
Chairman of Committees, 1882 caricature, showing Ebenezer Hamlin, on the left, as a dog with a bone marked 'Chairman of Committees', while a rat with a man's face, probably Arthur Seymour, previous Chairman of Committees, was defeated in November 1881

=== Marlborough Province ===
Seymour was elected onto the first Marlborough Provincial Council in 1860. During the council's first meeting, Seymour successfully moved that the provincial offices be built in Picton. This further fuelled the ongoing political conflict with other politicians who favoured Blenheim as the seat of provincial government. The Seat of Government shifted from Blenheim to Picton in 1861, only to revert to Blenheim in 1866. Together with all the other intense personal rivalries in the (e.g. between small farmers and pastoralists), provincial politics had a comic opera quality to it in the Marlborough Province. Seymour fuelled this conflict by being a stern supporter of Picton.

He served on the council over all of its 16 years of existence. He represented the electorates of Picton in the 1st, 2nd, 3rd, 5th and 6th council, and Awatere in the 4th and 7th council.

He was the Superintendent of Marlborough Province twice. His first time in office was from 19 September 1864 until Oct 1865. He resigned as he had been appointed to the Legislative Council in 1865. His second period as Superintendent was from 19 February 1874 until the abolition of provincial government on 31 October 1876.

Seymour was twice on the executive of the provincial council. First in 1860, and then in June and July 1864.

=== Legislative Council ===
Seymour was a member of the Legislative Council since 8 July 1865. During this time on the council, the dispute over the Seat of Government of Marlborough Province worsened and Seymour eventually resigned from the Legislative Council on 5 January 1872 to stand for Parliament to further his vision for Marlborough.

=== Parliament ===
New Zealand Parliament
Years	Term	Electorate	Party
1872–1875	5th	Wairau	Independent
1876–1879	6th	Wairau	Independent
1879–1881	7th	Wairau	Independent
1887–1890	10th	Waimea-Picton	Independent

He represented the Marlborough electorate of Wairau from 1872 to 6 May 1875 when he resigned, and from 1876 to 1881, when he was defeated.

The 1876 election was contested against George Henderson, a former Mayor of Blenheim. The 1881 general election was contested by Seymour and Henry Dodson, with Dodson gaining the majority support during the show of hands at the nomination meeting. On election day, Dodson and Seymour received 550 and 381 votes, respectively, a significant majority of 169. Dodson was thus returned.

The 1887 general election in the Waimea-Picton electorate was contested by Seymour, Joseph Harkness and Charles H. Mills, who received 446, 444 and 415 votes, respectively. Seymour was thus elected. He represented the electorate until the end of the term in 1890. He unsuccessfully contested the Wairau electorate in the 1890 election.

Seymour was the 4th Chairman of Committees, replacing the acting chairman Maurice O'Rorke on 16 July 1873. He held this post until May 1875, when he resigned. He was again elected into this position in July 1879 and held the role until dissolution of parliament in November 1881.

=== Local body politics and personal career ===
Seymour was three times mayor of Picton. He was a member of the Marlborough Land Board for many years. He was the longest serving Chairman of the Education Board in New Zealand's history as he was the longest serving member of the Waste Lands Board. Seymour was a captain in the militia, a Runholder (Tyntesfield), Captain and President of the Picton Cricket Club, President of the Marlborough Club, President of the Marlborough Lawn Tennis Club, President of the Blenheim and Picton Literary Institutes. He was also Chairman of the Picton Hospital, a Vestryman, Churchwarden and Layreader for the Holy Trinity Church at Picton, a Surveyor & Architect by Trade, and was an advocate for Industry in Marlborough; such as Goldmining, Coal mining, Frozen Meat Trade to England, Flaxmilling etc...

== Death ==
Seymour died at Picton on Tuesday, 3 April 1923. He was buried at Picton Cemetery.

== Notes ==
Political offices
Preceded by Thomas Carter	Superintendent of Marlborough Province; 1864–1865; 1870–1876	Succeeded by William Henry Eyes
Preceded by William Henry Eyes	Superintendent of Marlborough Province; 1864–1865; 1870–1876	Provincial Councils abolished
Preceded by Maurice O'Rorke	Chairman of Committees of the House of Representatives; 1873–1875; 1879–1881	Succeeded by Maurice O'Rorke
Preceded by Maurice O'Rorke	Chairman of Committees of the House of Representatives; 1873–1875; 1879–1881	Succeeded by Ebenezer Hamlin
New Zealand Parliament
Preceded by William Henry Eyes	Member of Parliament for Wairau; 1872–1875; 1879–1881	Succeeded by Joseph Ward
Preceded by Joseph Ward	Member of Parliament for Wairau; 1872–1875; 1879–1881	Succeeded by Henry Dodson
New constituency	Member of Parliament for Waimea-Picton; 1887–1890	Succeeded by Charles H. Mills
