= William Adams (New Zealand politician) =

New Zealand politician

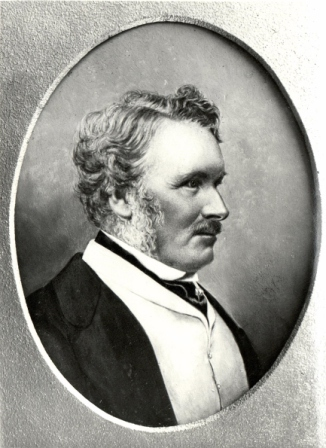

1st Superintendent of Marlborough Province
- In office 1860–1860
- Succeeded by: W. D. H. Baillie

Member of the New Zealand Parliament for Picton
- In office 1867–1868
- Preceded by: Arthur Beauchamp
- Succeeded by: Courtney Kenny

Personal details
- Born: 21 March 1811 Upton, Herefordshire, England
- Died: 23 July 1884 (aged 73) Langley Dale, Wairau Valley, New Zealand
- Relations: Acton Adams (son)

William Adams (21 March 1811 – 23 July 1884) was a 19th-century Member of Parliament from Marlborough, New Zealand and the first Superintendent of Marlborough Province.

== Early life ==
Adams was born in 1811 in Upton, Herefordshire, England. In 1850, he came to New Zealand with his family aboard the Eden, arriving in Nelson. He took up practice as a solicitor and purchased two runs in the Wairau Valley.

== Politics ==
New Zealand Parliament
Years	Term	Electorate	Party
1867–1868	4th	Picton	Independent

He was the first Superintendent of Marlborough Province in 1860, following the separation from the Nelson Province.

He represented the Picton electorate from 1867 to 1868, when he resigned.

On retiring from political life, he returned to practising law, replacing William Travers in the Nelson firm of Travers and Kingdon. The firm's name was changed to Adams and Kingdon.

== Death ==
Adams died on 23 July 1884. He is buried on his homestead Langley Dale on the north bank of the Wairau River. He was survived by his wife and four sons, including Acton Adams.

Political offices
New office	Superintendent of Marlborough Province; 1860	Succeeded by Captain Baillie
New Zealand Parliament
Preceded by Arthur Beauchamp	Member of Parliament for Picton; 1867–1868	Succeeded by Courtney Kenny
