= Picton (New Zealand electorate) =

Picton was a parliamentary electorate in the Marlborough Region of New Zealand, from 1861 to 1887.

== Population centres ==
The Picton electorate was based on the town of Picton, New Zealand which was also its main centre.

== History ==
The electorate was first created in 1861 for the term of the 3rd New Zealand Parliament. It existed until the end of the 9th Parliament in 1887.

David Monro was the first representative from 1861 to 1866. Arthur Beauchamp won the 1866 election, but resigned in 1867.

William Adams won the resulting 1867 by-election, but he resigned in 1868.

Courtney Kenny won 11 June 1868 by-election and represented the electorate until the end of the 7th Parliament in 1881.

The last representative was Edward Connolly, who represented Picton from 1881 until the electorate was abolished in 1887.

== Members ==
The electorate was represented by five Members of Parliament.

Key

Independent

Election	Winner
1861 election	David Monro
1866 election	Arthur Beauchamp
1867 by-election	William Adams
1868 by-election	Courtney Kenny
1871 election	Courtney Kenny
1876 election	Courtney Kenny
1879 election	Courtney Kenny
1881 election	Edward Connolly
1884 election	Edward Connolly
