= William Henry Eyes =

New Zealand politician (1819–1907)

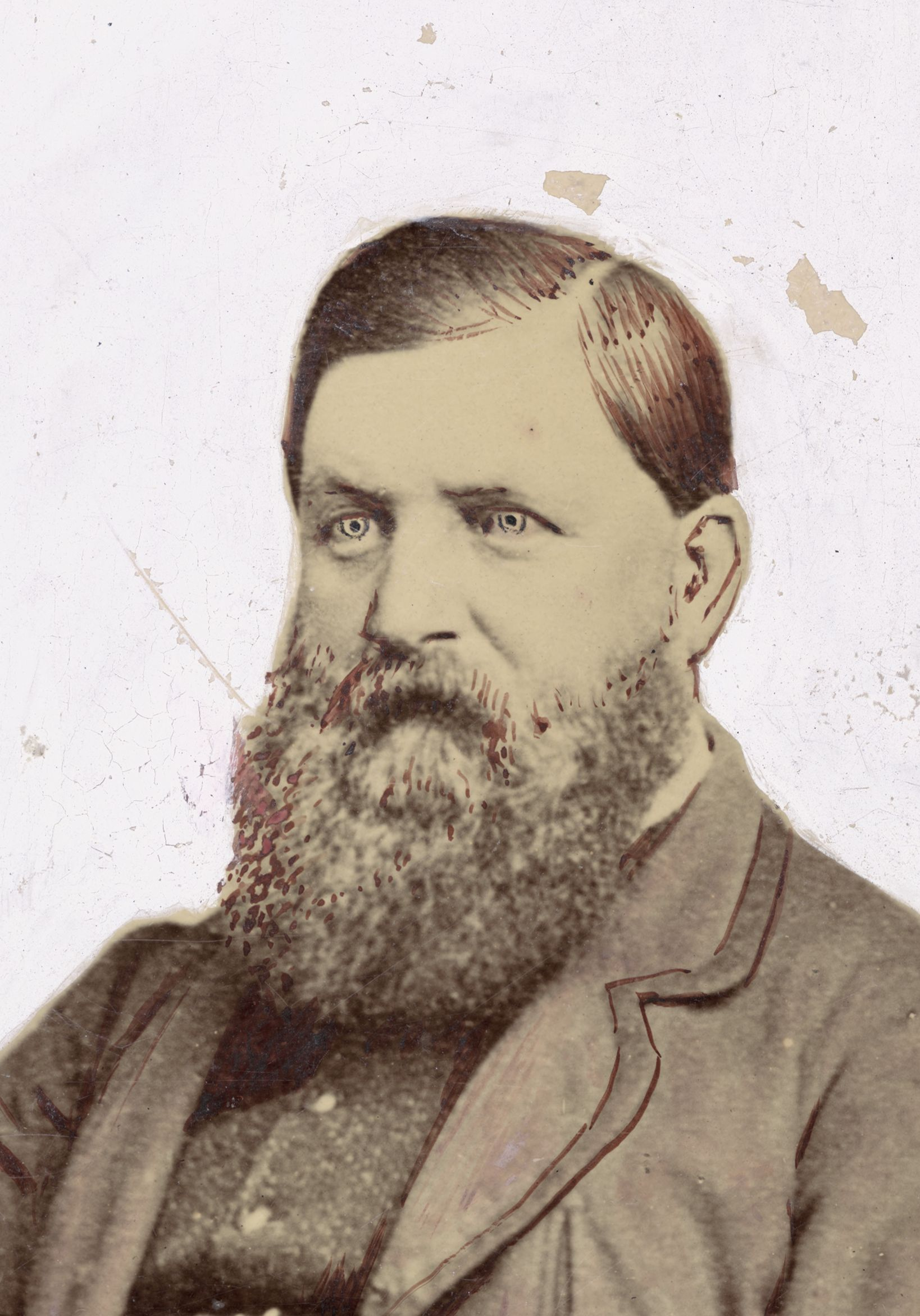
- Eyes in the 1870s

5th Superintendent of Marlborough Province
- In office 23 October 1865 – February 1870
- Preceded by: Arthur Seymour
- Succeeded by: Arthur Seymour

Member of the New Zealand Parliament for Wairau
- In office 15 February 1861 – December 1871
- Preceded by: Frederick Weld
- Succeeded by: Arthur Seymour

Personal details
- Born: 1819 Liverpool, England
- Died: 12 April 1907 (aged 87–88) Wellington, New Zealand

William Henry Eyes (1819 – 12 April 1907) was a British-born, New Zealand politician who was the fifth Superintendent of the Marlborough Province, and who represented the Wairau electorate in the New Zealand House of Representatives for many years. Born in England, Eyes had emigrated to Australia in 1839. He was jailed at Parramatta Gaol for a year before he was pardoned, after which he immediately emigrated to New Zealand.

== Early life ==
Eyes was born in Liverpool, England, in 1819, his grandfather was Charles Eyes (c.1754–1803) surveyor and architect. He received his education in Knutsford, Cheshire, England. He had an office job with the cotton brokers Gladstone and Sergeantson in Liverpool. He emigrated to Australia on the Bishop Heber and he arrived there in early 1839. After 1841, he had an interest in a cattle station in Batemans Bay. In July 1844, he was tried for a rape of a nine-year-old girl, but the jury found him guilty of common assault only, and he was sentenced to three years of imprisonment at Parramatta Gaol. He was, however, pardoned after just one year and travelled to New Zealand in the company of his cousin, the Revd C. L. Reay, in the Star of China to Nelson. His cousin had come to New Zealand with the Church Mission Society in 1843. They arrived in Nelson on 9 August 1845.

== New Zealand ==
New Zealand Parliament
Years	Term	Electorate	Party
1861–1866	3rd	Wairau	Independent
1866–1870	4th	Wairau	Independent
1871	5th	Wairau	Independent

In New Zealand, Eyes managed a sheep station for George Duppa, then managed Richmond Brook, and then Meadowbank Station.

He represented the Marlborough electorate of Wairau from 1861 to 1871, when he resigned, bringing about the 1872 Wairau by-election. In 1861 he defeated the future Premier of New Zealand, Frederick Weld to win the seat of Wairau. He was the 5th Superintendent of Marlborough Province from 1865 to 1870. He was the council's Speaker from 1871 to 1873. He represented the Lower Wairau electorate on the 1st to 6th Council from 1860 to 1871. In December 1871, he was appointed Crown Lands Commissioner for the Marlborough Province and as a public servant, he could no longer hold a seat in parliament and had to resign. On 25 September 1872 he was chosen as foundation president of the Marlborough Club.

In the 1884 election, he contested the Picton electorate, but was beaten by Edward Connolly.

In his later years, he lived in Wellington, where he died on 12 April 1907.

== Notes ==
Political offices
Preceded by Arthur Seymour	Superintendent of Marlborough Province; 1866–1870	Succeeded by Arthur Seymour
New Zealand Parliament
Preceded by Frederick Weld	Member of Parliament for Wairau; 1861–1871	Succeeded by Arthur Seymour
