= Marlborough Province =

Province of New Zealand (1859–1876)

- Province of New Zealand
- Marlborough
- Marlborough Province within New Zealand
- Coordinates: 41.514°S 173.960°E
- Country: New Zealand
- Island: South Island
- Established: 1 November 1859
- Abolished: 31 October 1876
- Named after: John Churchill, 1st Duke of Marlborough
- Seat: Blenheim

Marlborough was one of the provinces of New Zealand. Following a petiton by residents of the district, the Governor (Thomas Gore Browne) issued an order to ″establish a New Province to be called and known by the name of Marlborough ... And doth declare that this Order shall take effect on the first day of November, 1859″, from lands previously within the Province of Nelson. The province existed until the abolition of provincial government on 31 October 1876.

== History ==
Marlborough split away from the Nelson Province because the majority of the income of the Nelson Provincial Council came from land sales in the Marlborough region, but the funds were mostly used in the Nelson region. Land sales in Nelson and Marlborough netted the council £33,000 and £160,000, respectively. Of that, £200 was expended benefiting the Marlborough region. Marlborough settlers successfully petitioned for a split from Nelson. Another reason was that large landholders feared the growing influence of smaller farmers and urban residents. By splitting Marlborough Province off with its large farms, it was easier for these landholders to control the provincial council.

When the province was formed, Sir Thomas Gore Browne, the Governor of New Zealand, named it after John Churchill, 1st Duke of Marlborough. The settlement of Blenheim was subsequently named after the Battle of Blenheim (1704), where troops led by the Duke defeated a combined French and Bavarian force at the village of Blenheim (Blindheim) in Germany.

== Area ==
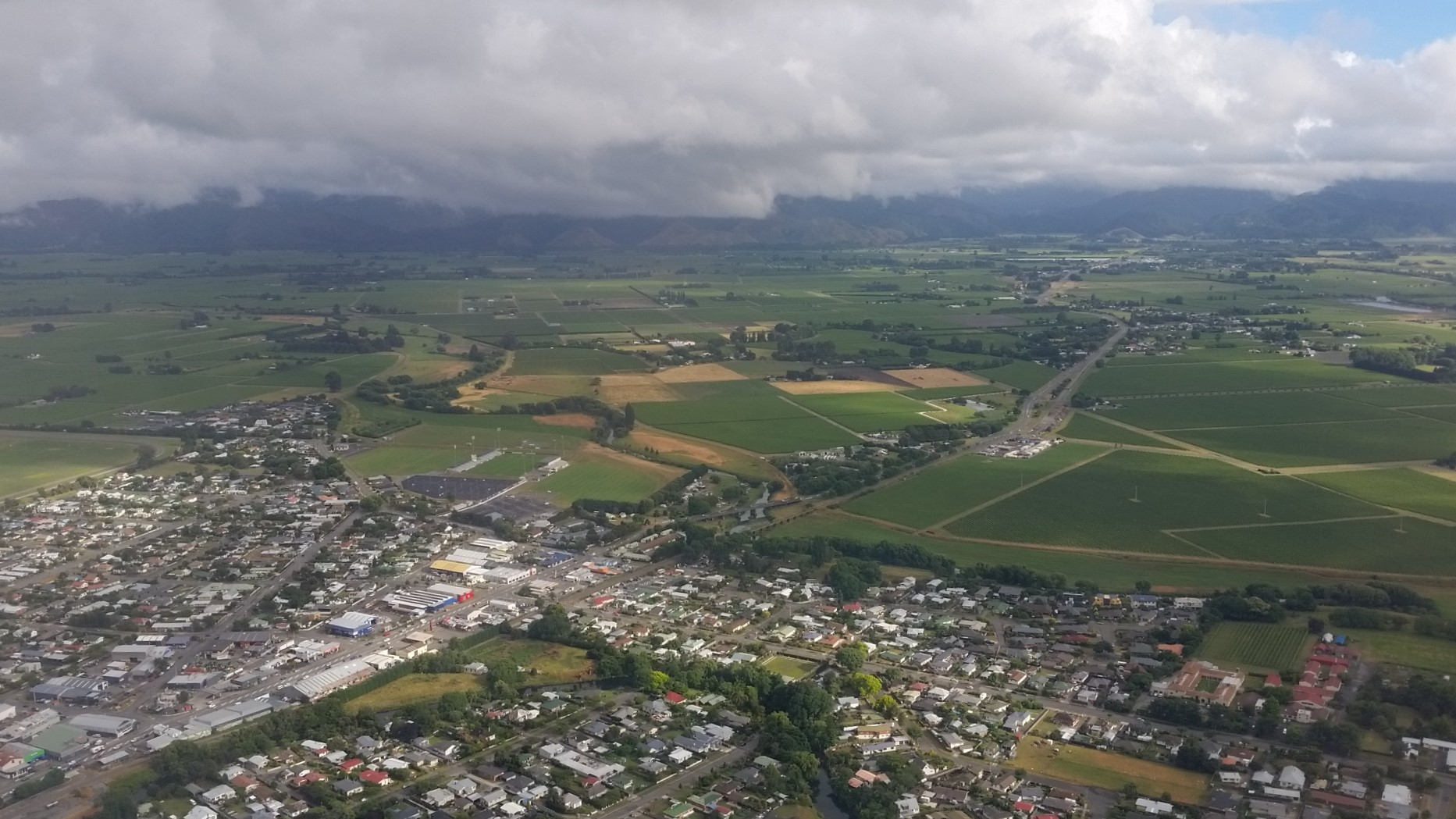
View from above looking north from Blenheim

Marlborough Province was notable for its intense personal rivalries among its politicians. This led to a farcical change of capital between the two main towns, Blenheim and Picton. Sources conflict as to the exact sequence of events. However, the Order in Council establishing the province states: ″And the Governor ... constitute the town of Picton, heretofore called Waitohi, to be the capital of the said Province of Marlborough.″ By 1866, the capital of the province had moved to Blenheim. In a symbolic way, government buildings in both Blenheim and Picton burned down some months after the abolition of the provincial system.

Marlborough was not systematically settled like other regions, but capital-rich settlers from the Nelson area spilled over who wanted to invest in large land holdings. Frederick Weld was the first in 1847 to land sheep at Port Underwood, a sheltered harbour which forms the north-east extension of Cloudy Bay in the Marlborough Sounds. Because of its early start in sheep farming, other South Island areas were stocked from here.

== Anniversary Day ==
New Zealand law provides an anniversary day for each former province. Marlborough celebrates its founding on a Monday near 1 November each year.

== Superintendents ==
Marlborough Province had five superintendents:

No.	from	to	Superintendent
1	1 May 1860	20 Jul 1861	William Adams
2	28 Aug 1861	18 Feb 1863	Captain Baillie
3	25 Mar 1863	30 Jul 1864	Thomas Carter
4	19 Sep 1864	Oct 1865	Arthur Seymour
5	23 Oct 1865	Feb 1870	William Henry Eyes
	28 Mar 1870	31 Oct 1876	Arthur Seymour (2nd time)

== Legislation ==
- Picton Institute Act 1864
