= Mary Downie Stewart =

New Zealand political hostess, welfare worker

Mary Downie Stewart OBE (13 November 1876 – 27 March 1957) was a notable New Zealand political hostess and welfare worker. She was born in Dunedin, New Zealand in 1876. Her father was William Downie Stewart Sr, a lawyer and from 1879 a member of the House of Representatives. Her mother, Rachel Hepburn, died when Mary was two years old. Her grandfather was the politician George Hepburn. She was very close to her siblings, including Rachel Hepburn Stewart and William Downie Stewart Jr

She acted as mayoress for her younger brother William when he was elected Mayor of Dunedin. She was appointed an Officer of the Most Excellent Order of the British Empire (OBE) for her support of soldiers and their family during World War I. In 1916, Downie Stewart was one of thirty-three New Zealand women awarded the Médaille de la Reine Elisabeth (Queen Elisabeth Medal) for their efforts towards the Belgian Relief Fund during the war.

Downie Stewart later supported her brother when he was elected to the House of Representatives, and was recognised as the person "to whom the country owes its new minister" when William was appointed to cabinet.
