= Rachel Armitage =

Rachel Armitage may refer to:

- Rachel Armitage (social worker) (1873–1955), New Zealand welfare worker and community leader
- Rachel Armitage (politician) (active 2022–2023), American politician
