= William Downie Stewart Sr. =

New Zealand politician (1842–1898)

The Hon. Downie Stewart MP, MLC
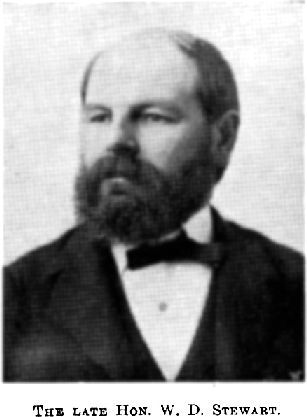
- Downie Stewart

Member of the New Zealand Parliament for City of Dunedin
- In office 1879–1881

Member of the New Zealand Parliament for Dunedin West
- In office 1884–1890

Member of the New Zealand Legislative Council
- In office 1890–1898

Personal details
- Born: 15 May 1842 Blair Drummond; Scotland
- Died: 25 November 1898 (aged 56) New Zealand
- Spouse(s): Rachel Stewart (née Hepburn, d. 1878); Mary Stewart (née Thomson, m. 1881)
- Children: Five by first wife, including Rachelina Hepburn Stewart, William Downie Stewart Jr, George Hepburn Stewart, and Mary Downie Stewart; one daughter by second wife
- Occupation: Lawyer, politician

William Downie Stewart (15 May 1842 – 25 November 1898) was a 19th-century New Zealand politician and a lawyer.

== Early life ==
Stewart was born in Blair Drummond near Stirling in Scotland. His parents were Alexander Stewart and Mary (née Downie). He commenced to study law in Scotland, but came to Dunedin aged 19 in 1861, arriving on the Robert Henderson on 8 October. In Dunedin, he continued his studies.

Stewart had eleven siblings, and over time nine of them also migrated to Dunedin. He married Rachel Stewart (née Hepburn), the youngest daughter of the early Dunedin settler George Hepburn. They had five children, four of whom survived into adulthood. All of these continued Stewart's work in public service. After Rachel's death in 1878, Stewart married Mary Thomson; they produced one child, a daughter. Both his widow and daughter left New Zealand shortly after his death.

== Legal career ==
Stewart joined the offices of Richmond and Gillies. In 1863, when the Otago and Southland district was constituted under the Supreme Court Act, Richmond became a judge and Stewart joined the office of Prendergast, Kenyon and Maddock. James Prendergast was later appointed Chief Justice of New Zealand. Stewart was admitted to the bar on 12 June 1867 and began practising on his own. Robert Stout worked for him for some time.

== Political career ==
New Zealand Parliament
Years	Term	Electorate	Party
1879	6th	City of Dunedin	Independent
1879–1881	7th	City of Dunedin	Independent
1884–1887	9th	Dunedin West	Independent
1887–1890	10th	Dunedin West	Independent

The resignation of Robert Stout triggered a by-election in the City of Dunedin electorate. Stewart won the 14 July 1879 by-election with a majority of 163 votes over his great friend Charles Reeves and entered Parliament. He was offered the position of Attorney-General, but declined.

Stewart was confirmed in the same electorate in the 1879 general election on 2 September. The three-member electorate was contested by six candidates. Thomas Dick, Richard Oliver and Stewart received 1140, 1044 and 989 votes, respectively. Stewart had a margin of 245 votes to the fourth-placed candidate.

At the 1881 general election, he contested the newly formed Dunedin West electorate, but lost against Dick, who had a majority of eight votes (459 and 451 votes for Dick and Stewart, respectively). At the 1884 general election, he again contested the Dunedin West electorate against Dick, and this time Stewart was successful, receiving 508 versus 481 votes for Dick. The pair once contested this electorate in the 1887 general election. Stewart and Dick received 706 and 697 votes, respectively – a majority of nine for Stewart.

Stewart retired from Parliament in 1890 at the end of the electoral term, and was appointed to the Legislative Council. He was appointed from 22 January 1891 as one of seven new members (including Harry Atkinson himself) appointed to the council by the outgoing fourth Atkinson Ministry; a move regarded by Liberals as a stacking of the upper house against the new government. These were the last life-appointment made to the Legislative Council by Lord Onslow.

His father in law, George Hepburn was also a Member of Parliament. He represented the Roslyn electorate from 1866 to 1869.

His son, William Downie Stewart Jr, represented Dunedin West for nearly 20 years, was Minister of Finance and at one time acting Prime Minister.

== Family ==
William Downie Stewart had five children by his first wife, Rachelina Hepburn. Their first child, Alexander Westwood, died in 1870 aged five months. Their first daughter, Rachelina Hepburn, was born in 1873. George Hepburn was born in 1875 and Mary Downie in 1876. Their last son, named William Downie after his father, was born on 29 July 1878. His wife died within months of giving birth. Stewart Jr later became Mayor of Dunedin and his sister Mary acted as his Lady Mayoress.

Stewart Sr remarried in 1881, to Mary Thomson, the youngest daughter of William Thomson, formerly Provost of Irvine, North Ayrshire, Scotland. A daughter, Ethel Margaret, was born in New Zealand in 1881. Stewart died on 25 November 1898.

New Zealand Parliament
Preceded by Robert Stout	Member of Parliament for City of Dunedin; 1879–81; Served alongside: Richard Oliver (1878–81) and Thomas Dick (1879–81)	Vacant Constituency abolished; recreated in 1890 Title next held by William Hutchison, David Pinkerton and Henry Fish
Preceded by Thomas Dick	Member of Parliament for Dunedin West; 1884–90	Vacant Constituency abolished; recreated in 1908 Title next held by John A. Millar
