= Archibald Hilson Ross =

New Zealand politician

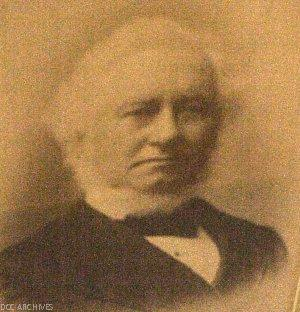

New Zealand Parliament
Years	Term	Electorate	Party
1884–1887	9th	Roslyn	Independent
1887–1890	10th	Roslyn	Independent

Archibald Hilson Ross (1821 – (9 December 1900) was a 19th-century Member of Parliament from the Otago region of New Zealand, and Mayor of Dunedin.

He was Mayor of Dunedin from 1880 to 1881.

Ross came second in the 1878 Roslyn by-election, beaten by Henry Driver. He represented the Roslyn electorate from 1884 to 1890. He was defeated in the 1890 general election for the new electorate of Dunedin Suburbs.

His obituary says he was an optician and enthusiastic astronomical observer, and was living with a son in Pahiatua when he died. He left a widow and a grown-up family. His death was registered as Archibald Wilson Ross.

He was born in Newcastle-on-Tyne, and sailed for New Zealand in 1859.

New Zealand Parliament
Preceded by John Bathgate	Member of Parliament for Roslyn; 1884–1890	Constituency abolished
