= Enniscorthy =

Town in County Wexford, Ireland

Enniscorthy Inis Córthaidh
- Town
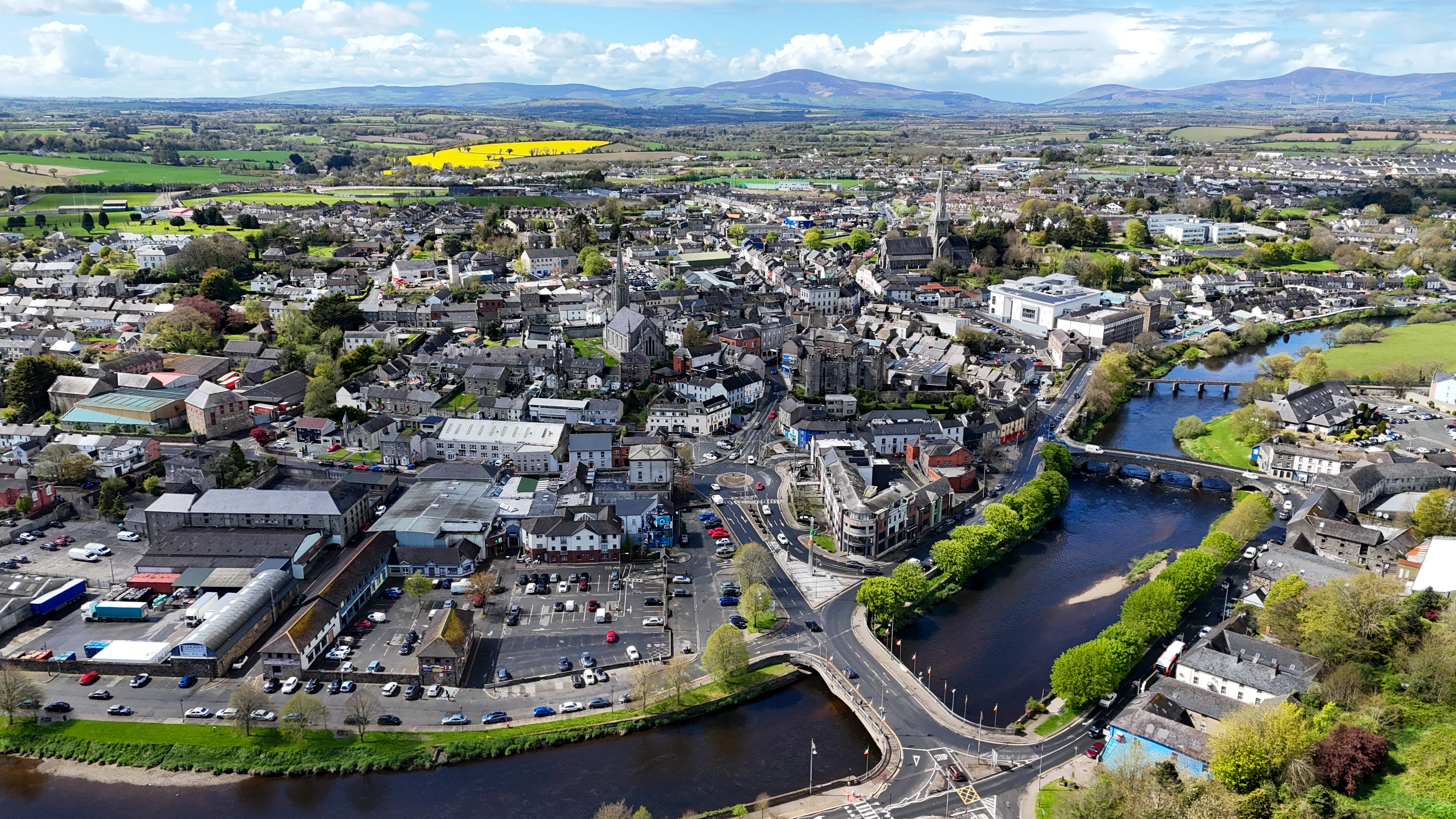
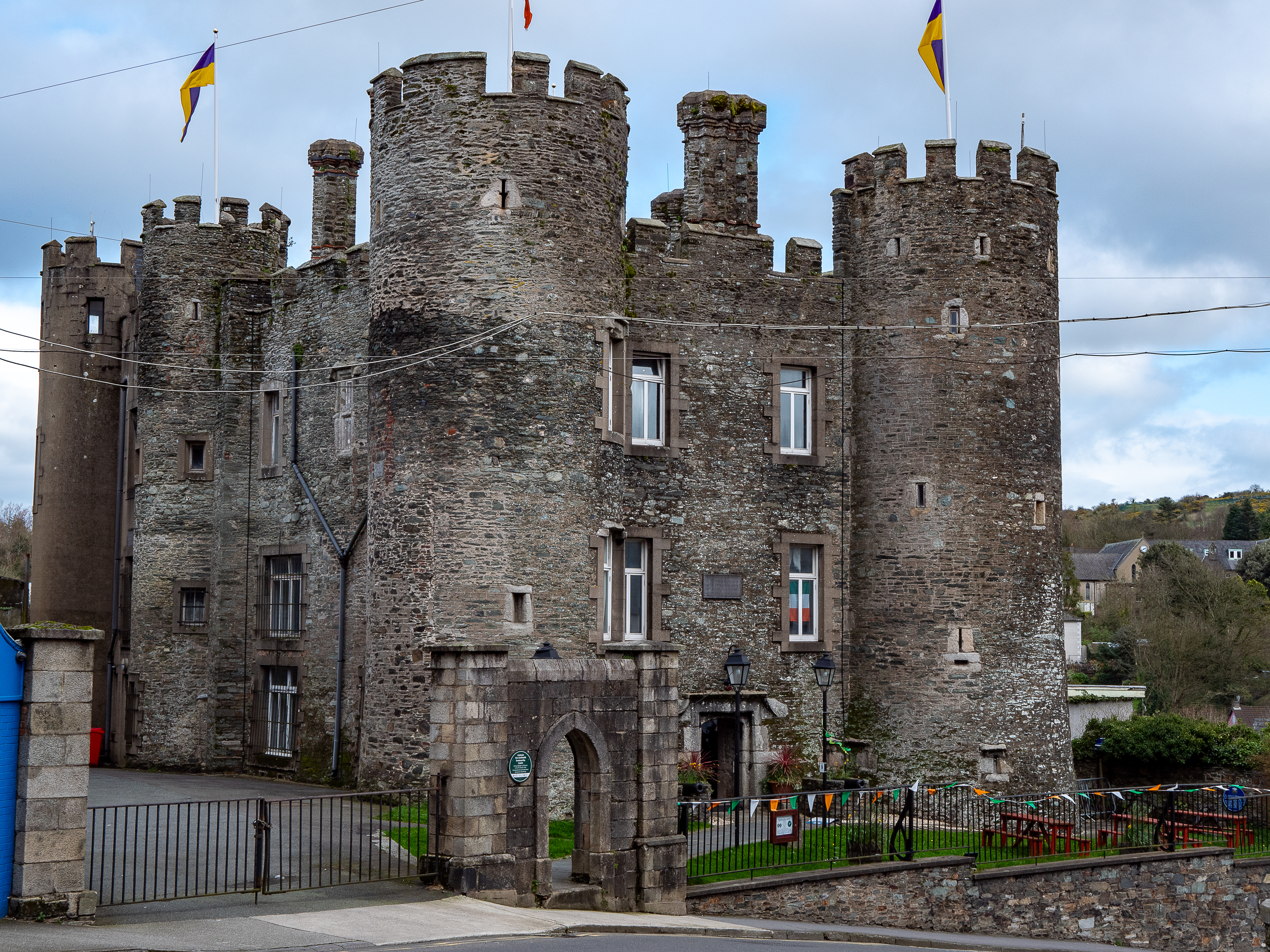
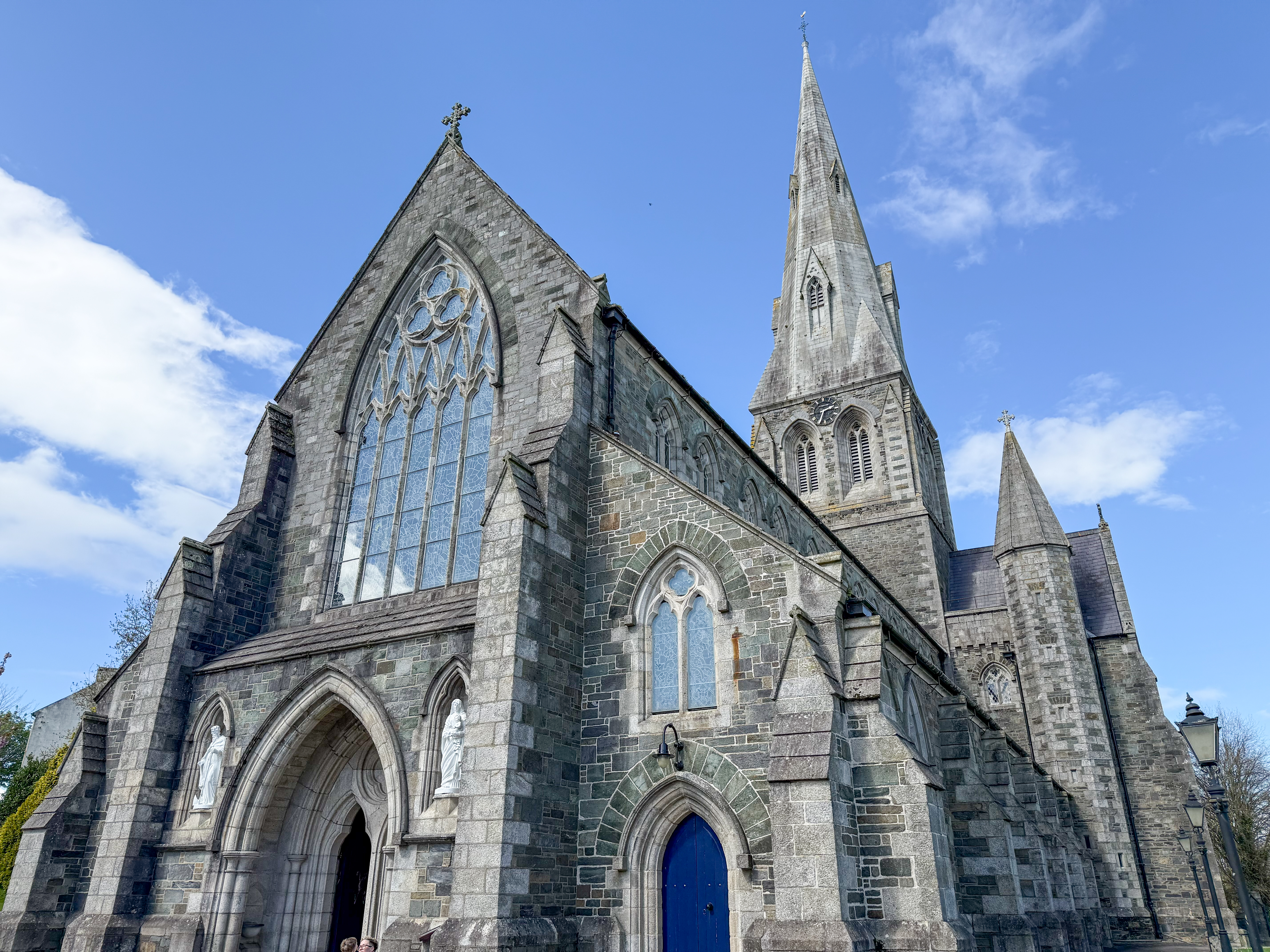
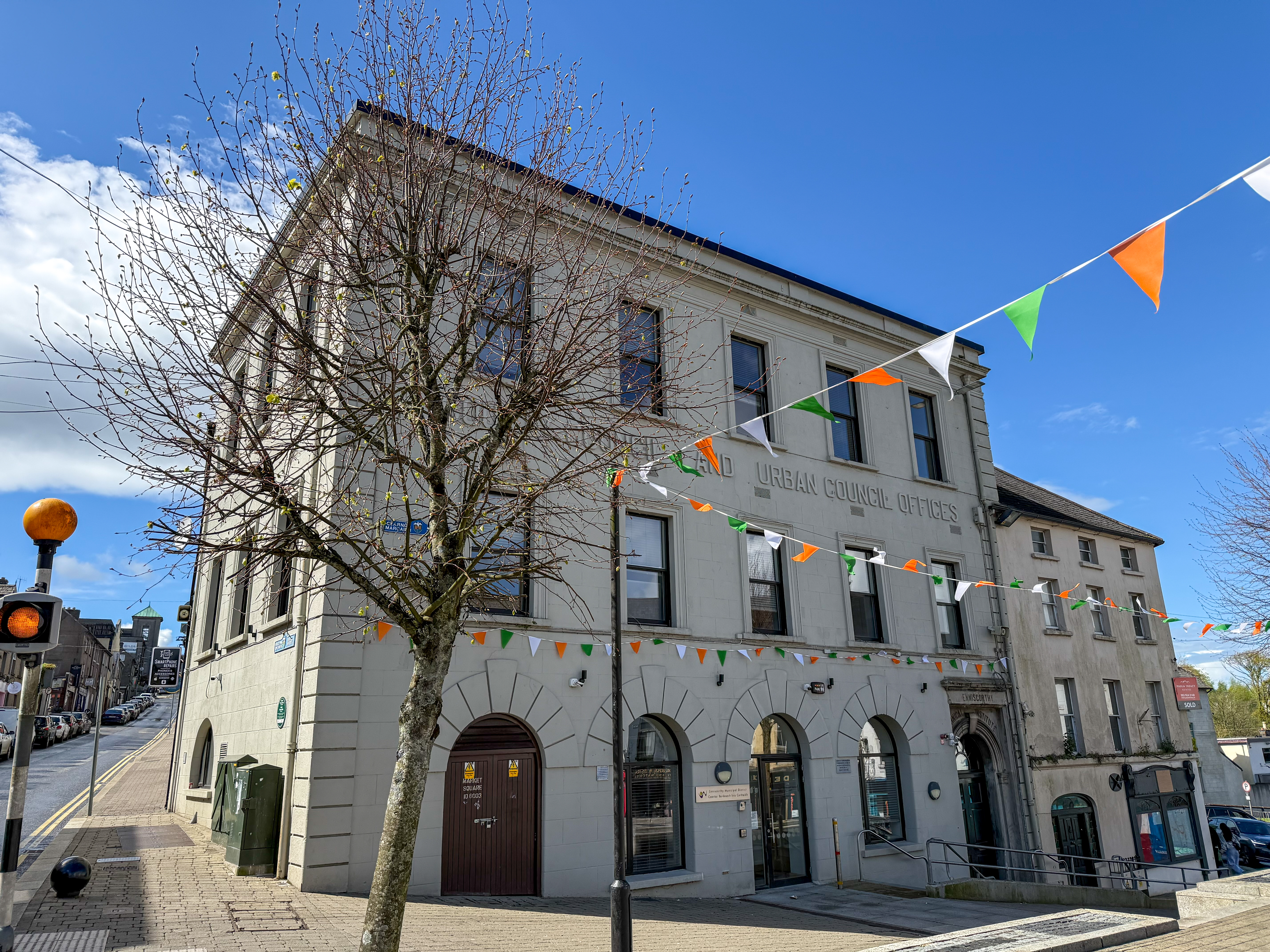
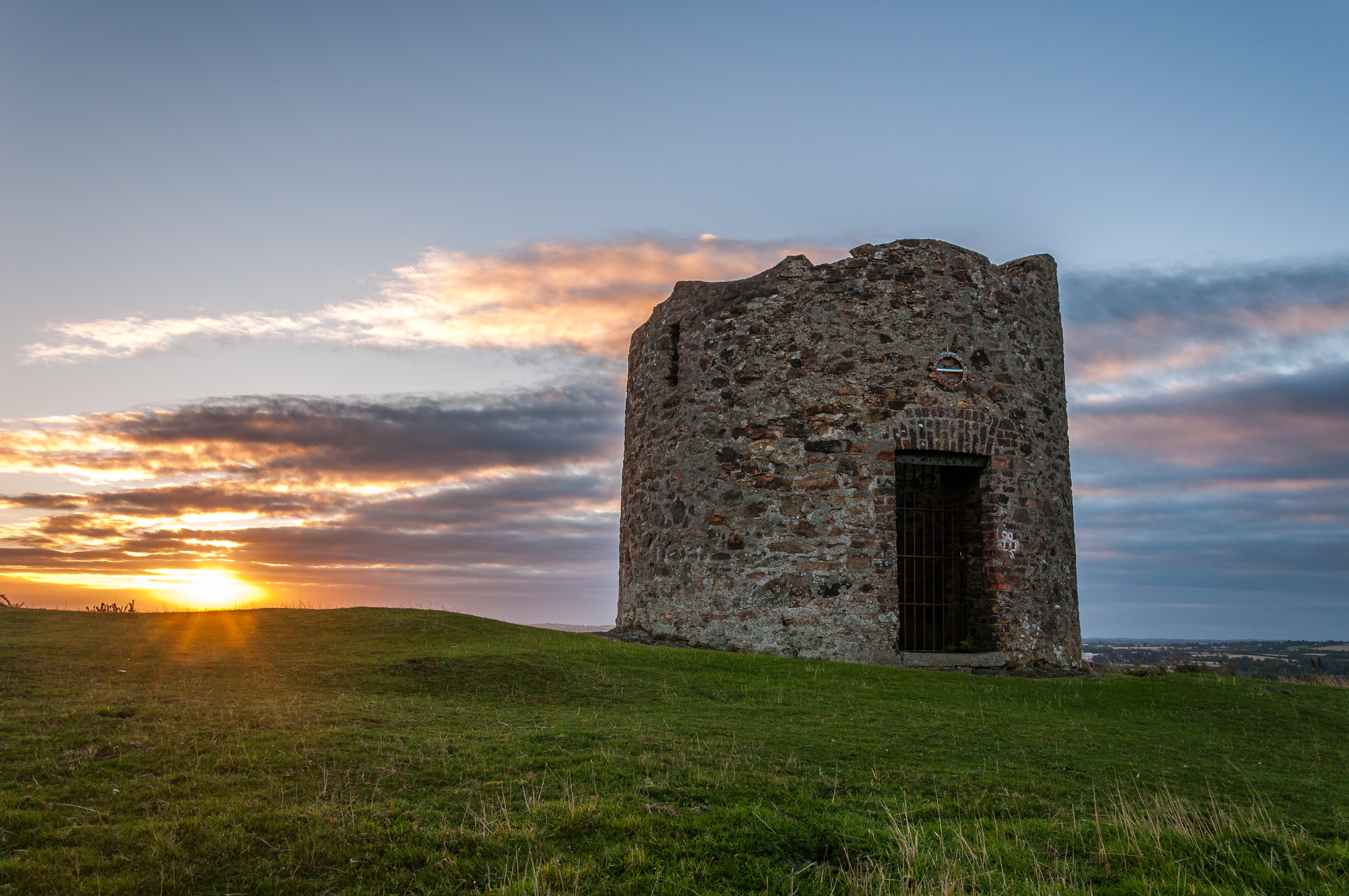
- Town skyline Enniscorthy Castle St. Aidan's Cathedral Market House Vinegar Hill Windmill

- Location in Ireland
- Coordinates: 52.502064°N 6.565876°W
- Country: Ireland
- Province: Leinster
- County: County Wexford
- Elevation: 60 m (200 ft)

Population (2022)
  - Total: 12,310
- Time zone: UTC±0 (WET)
  - Summer (DST): UTC+1 (IST)
- Eircode routing key: Y21
- Telephone area code: +353(0)53
- Irish Grid Reference: S969399

Enniscorthy (Irish: Inis Córthaidh) is the second-largest town in County Wexford, Ireland. The town is located on the River Slaney and in close proximity to the Blackstairs Mountains and Ireland's longest beach, Curracloe.

The town's name may refer either to the "Island of Corthaidh" or the "Island of Rocks". The cathedral of the Roman Catholic Diocese of Ferns is located in the town as well as an array of other historical sites such as Enniscorthy Castle and the key battle site of the 1798 Rebellion.

At the 2022 census, the population of the urban area of Enniscorthy was 12,310. The town is twinned with Gimont, France.

== History ==
=== Enniscorthy Castle ===
Enniscorthy Castle is an imposing Norman stronghold, which dates from 1205 and was a private dwelling until 1951. The castle was built by the DePrendergasts. In the early 1580s, the poet Edmund Spenser leased the property that included the castle.

The castle was also once owned by Sir Henry Wallop. The castle was the site of many fierce battles during the Cromwellian years and also during the 1798 Rising. The castle houses the Wexford County Museum, which contains extensive 1798 rebellion-related material, as well as items of local and agricultural interest. It was closed for major refurbishment from 2007 until May 2011.

=== Vinegar Hill ===
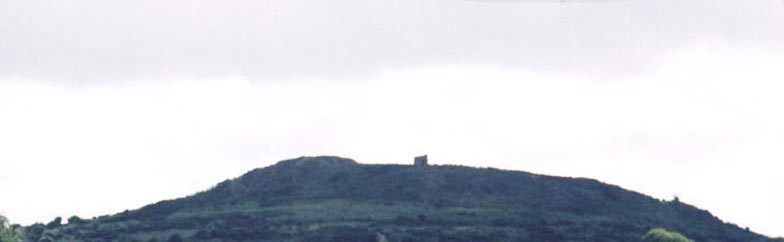
View of Vinegar Hill from Enniscorthy

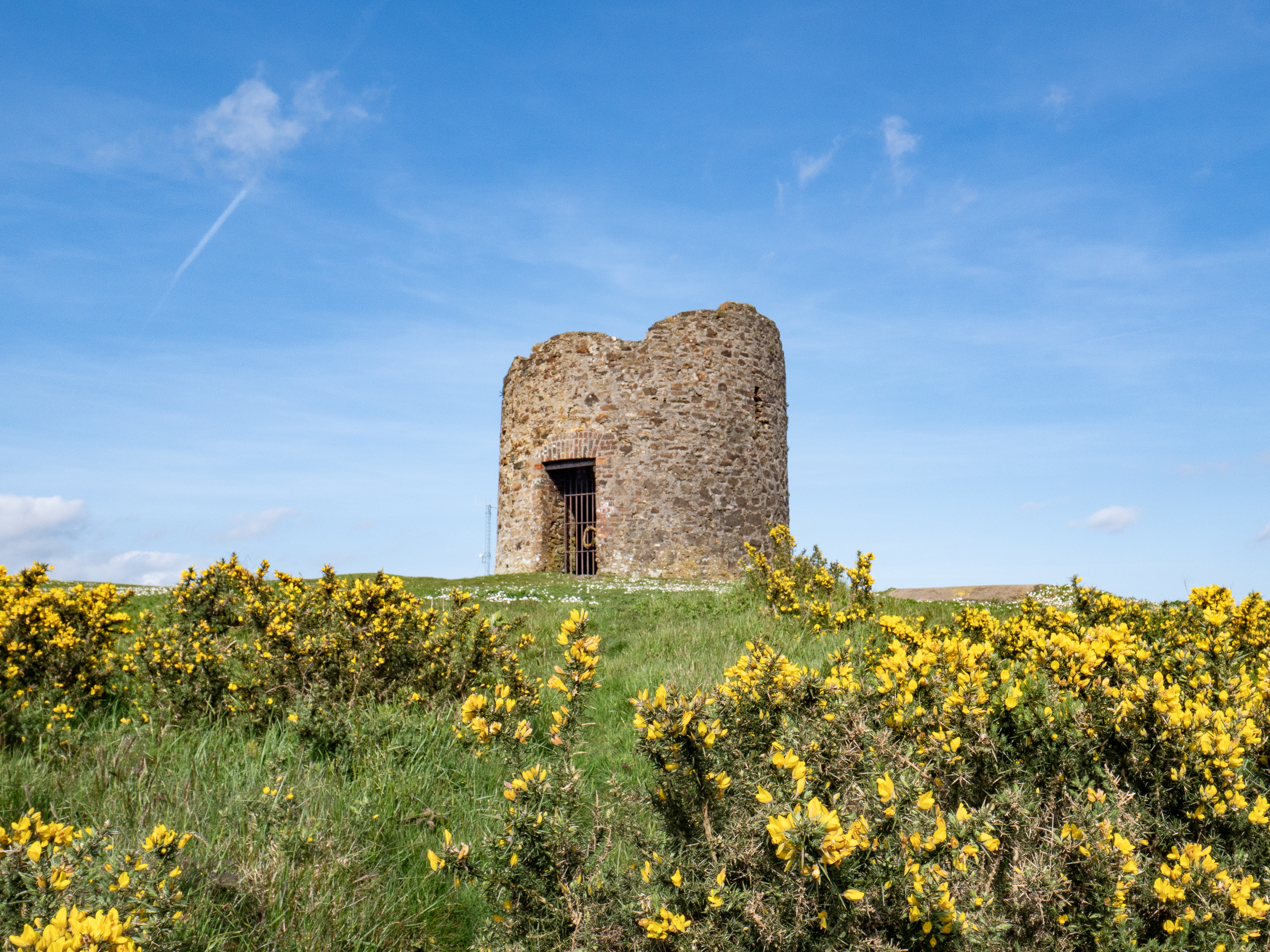
Ruin of the tower mill on Vinegar Hill

Vinegar Hill (Cnoc Fhiodh na gCaor in Irish which translates as 'hill of the berry-tree'), a pudding-shaped hill overlooking the town, was the largest camp and headquarters of the rebels of 1798 who controlled County Wexford for thirty days against vastly superior forces, before their defeat on 21 June. However, many managed to flee south through a gap left in the British lines by General Needham (now known as Needham's Gap). During this time, Beauchamp Bagnell Harvey was declared President of the Wexford Republic.

=== The National 1798 Rebellion Centre ===
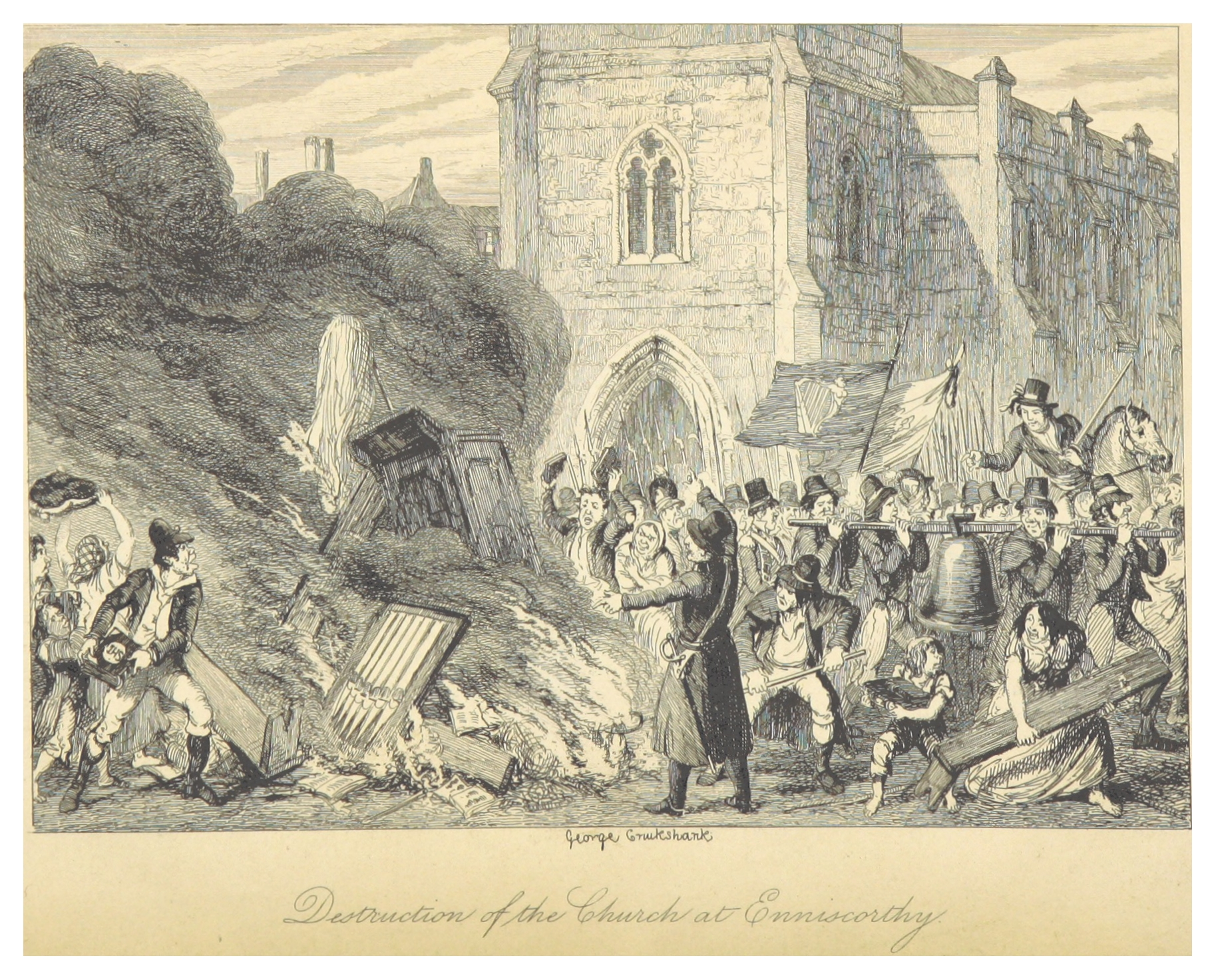
Destruction of the Church of Enniscorthy – illustrated by George Cruikshank (1845)

The National 1798 Rebellion Centre is devoted to the history and aftermath of the 1798 Rebellion, setting it in its European context. It is housed in the former Congregation of Christian Brothers monastery. The Centre offers people the chance to see what famous figures were involved in the 1798 Rebellion.

=== Saint Aidan's Cathedral ===
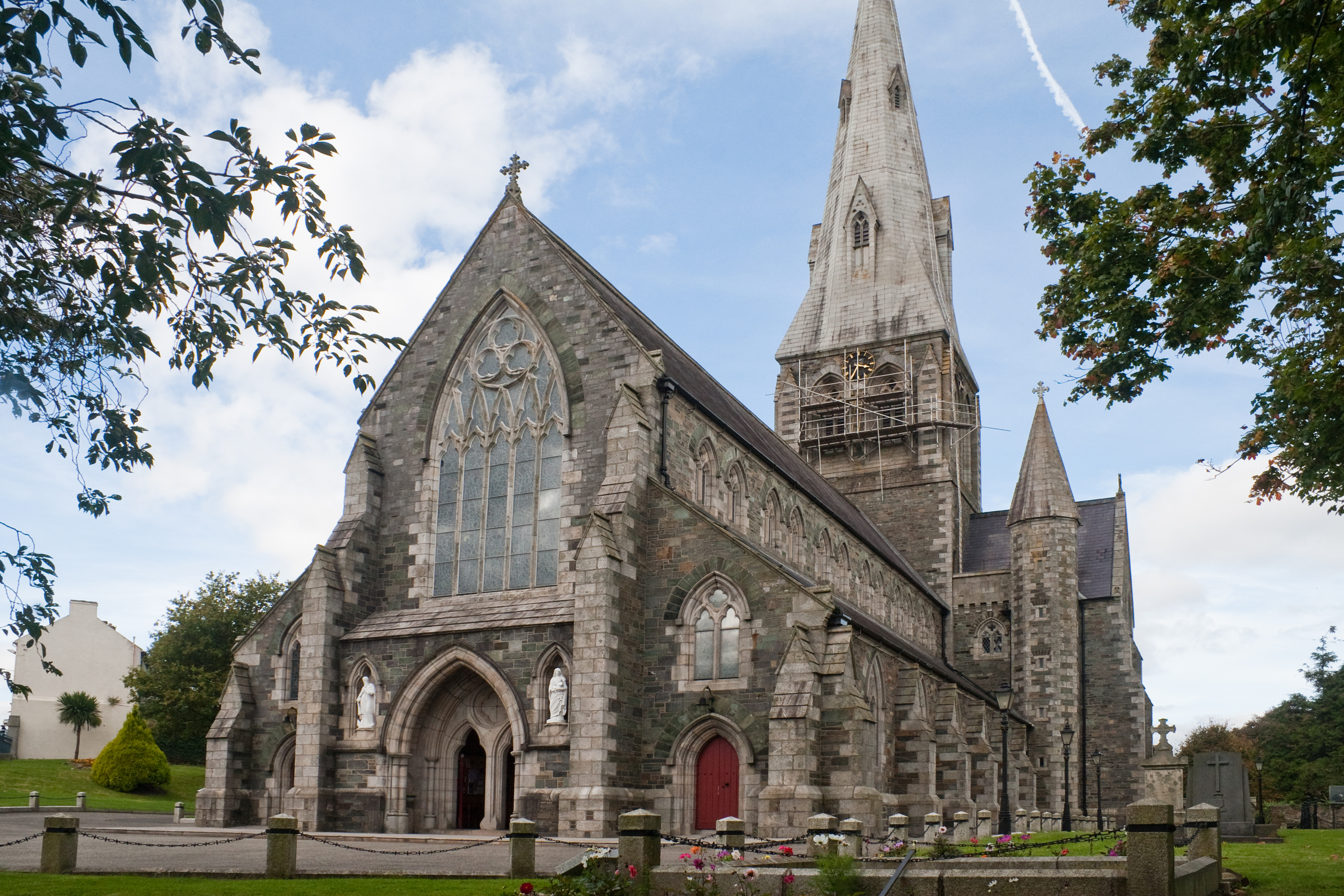
Saint Aidan's Cathedral, Enniscorthy

Following the relaxation of the Penal Laws at the beginning of the 19th century, it became possible for the Roman Catholic community to consider building a cathedral to replace the one in Ferns that had been appropriated for use by the Church of Ireland during the English Reformation. Built in 1843, St. Aidan's Cathedral was designed by Augustus Welby Pugin, famous for having designed London's Houses of Parliament. The cathedral is in the same Neo-Gothic style. Notable features include the striking façade, a reredos carved from Caen stone and a great north window with intricate stone tracery. The cathedral was subsequently much renovated (in line with reforms promulgated by the Second Vatican Council). It was restored to its near original design in 1994 when authentic colours, materials and techniques were used. The restoration took a year, during which time cathedral services were held at St Mary's church (Church of Ireland) nearby.

=== 1916 Rising ===
In 1916 Enniscorthy patriots again took their place in history, when James Connolly requested that the Enniscorthy Volunteers take and hold the railway line to prevent reinforcements from reaching Dublin. 600 Volunteers took the town, led by Robert Brennan, Seamus Doyle and J R Etchingham, they surrounded the police station but did not attempt to take it. The RIC barracks was held by a police inspector and five constables while a RIC sergeant and one constable prevented the rebels from taking over a bank in the town. They established their headquarters at the Athenaeum, and held control until asked to surrender by Padraig Pearse.

The Volunteers also established a strong position on Vinegar Hill, overlooking the town. The railway line was cut and men dispatched to Gorey and Ferns. The government responded by sending a force of more than 1,000 men to retake Enniscorthy and the rebels retired to their positions on Vinegar Hill. Before hostilities could develop, the news of the Dublin surrender arrived, but the Volunteers refused to believe it. To avoid bloodshed, the army commander Col. F A French offered safe conduct for the Wexford leaders so that they could go to Dublin and hear of the surrender directly from Pearse. There were no fatalities.

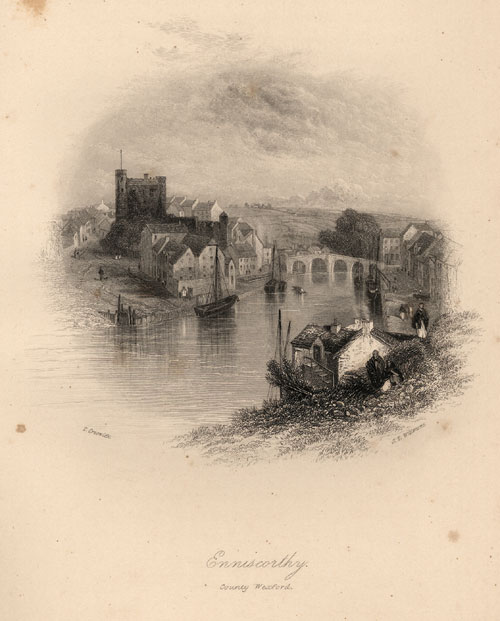
Enniscorthy in 1837

=== Early aviation ===
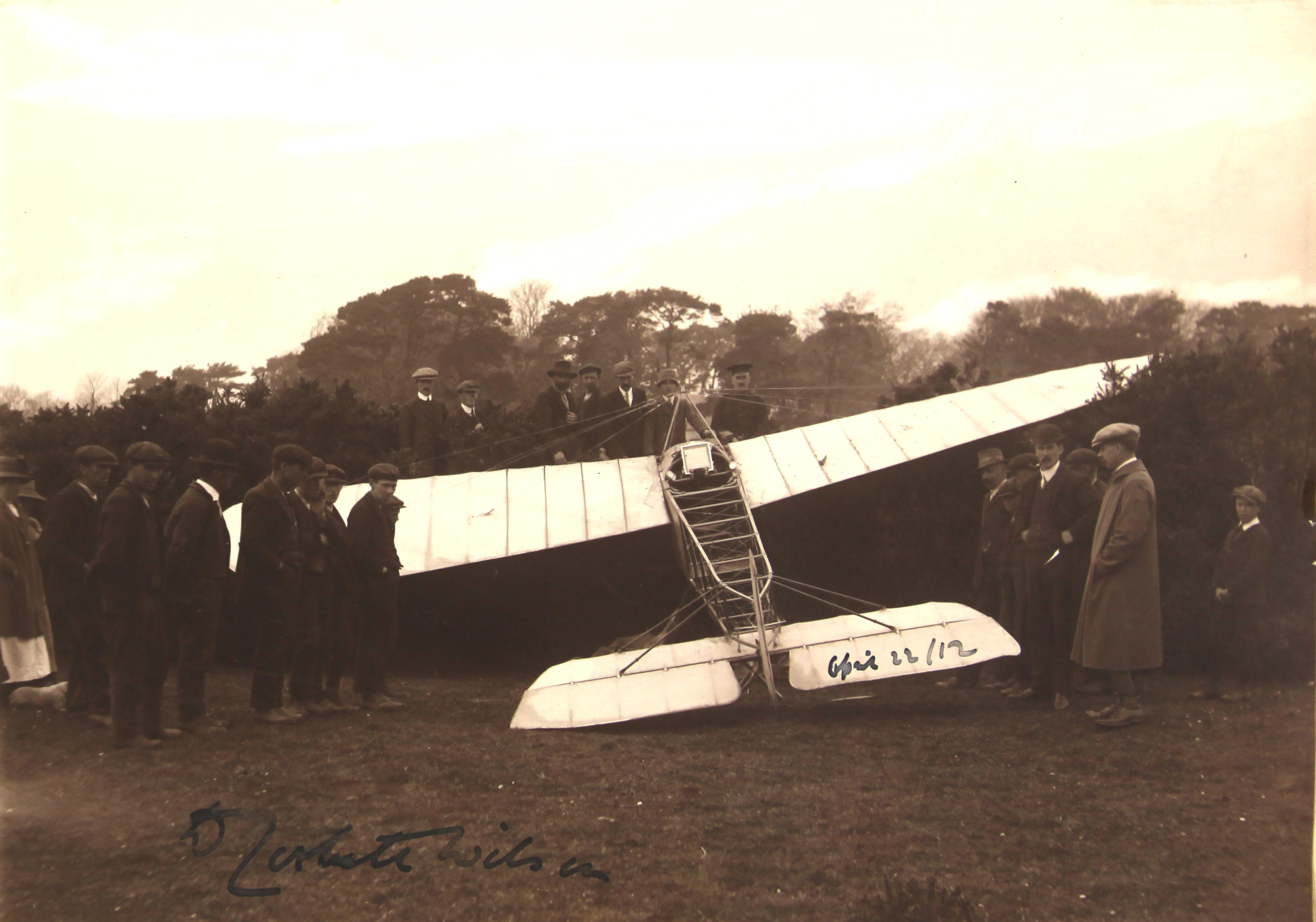
Corbett Wilson's Bleriot XI crash-landed in Crane, near Enniscorthy, Ireland, after his record-breaking flight from Goodwick in 1912.

The first successful flight from Britain to Ireland was made from Goodwick's Harbour Village on 22 April 1912 by Denys Corbett Wilson, flying a Bleriot XI. The flight lasted one hour 40 minutes, with landfall near Enniscorthy, Ireland. The achievement was commemorated in Centenary Celebrations held in Fishguard and Goodwick on the weekend of 21/22 April 2012 and in a specially commissioned stage play by Derek Webb, called '100 Minutes' which was performed in Fishguard and Wexford the same week.

== Amenities ==
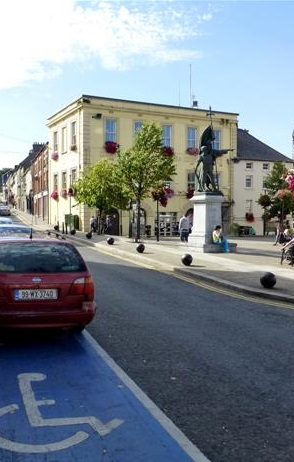
Enniscorthy Market House

Enniscorthy is situated by the River Slaney, and has riverside walks beside it to the north and to the south, on the west bank. Further walking trails are available nearby such Vinegar Hill, Ringwood Forest, Borodale Forest and Oulart Hill.

There is a swimming pool/recreation centre, several sports grounds including a rugby club, soccer clubs, GAA clubs and several hotels. Outside of the town, there is an 18-hole golf course, several pitch and putts, freshwater fishing, and a five-star spa.

The town is also a base for adventure activity such as kayaking on the River Slaney, mountain biking on Bree Hill or hiking in the Blackstairs Mountains.

The town has a number of historical sites and museums as well as an Arts Centre and Theatre Groups.

It is the cathedral town of the Diocese of Ferns and has two Catholic churches spread over two parishes — St. Aidan's and St Senan's, under the shadow of Vinegar Hill. The town also has a Church of Ireland, a joint Methodist/Presbyterian church, a non-denominational Christian Alive Church, a Society of Friends meeting hall, and a Masonic Lodge.

Enniscorthy Market House was completed in the late 18th century.

== Events ==
=== Enniscorthy Arts Trail ===
Established in 2018, Enniscorthy Arts Trail is an artist led initiative that sees vacant buildings in Enniscorthy town transformed and offered to visual artists as gallery spaces, workshop hubs, and cultural centres during the August Bank Holiday weekend. Enniscorthy Arts Trail also offers a number of tours and arts performances, hosted by St. Mary's Church and The Presentation Centre.

=== Enniscorthy Rockin' Food & Fruit Festival ===
The Enniscorthy Rockin' Food Festival has been an annual August Bank Holiday event in Enniscorthy since 2016. Now renamed the Rockin' Food & Fruit Festival, it takes place over the August Bank Holiday Weekend. The festival brings in local food and fruit producers, family entertainment and live music.

It primarily involves free outdoor 1950s/Rockabilly themed gigs, a trail of food and craft marquees, an artisan food market, and events and classes for adults and children. There are also food and drink workshops that run alongside the festival in local cafés and restaurants. Enniscorthy Rockin' Food Festival was born from the amalgamation of a number of smaller community festivals taking place in Enniscorthy. It was decided by a committee that there was demand for one larger festival combining all elements of the smaller community festivals.

The Blackstairs Blues festival is also an annual event and includes international and local performers, in a variety of late-night concerts and workshops.

== Education ==
Enniscorthy has four second-level schools: Coláiste Bríde, St. Mary's CBS, Enniscorthy Community College and Meánscoil Gharman and four primary schools – St. Aidan's, St. Mary's, St. Senan's and Gaelscoil Inis Córthaidh. St. Patricks’s Special School is based in Enniscorthy. Catering for students aged 5–18 with a Moderate Global Learning Delay and a Severe/ Profound Global Learning Delay. Students from the whole of County Wexford and South County Wicklow attend. St. Patrick’s was established in 1968.

== Arts and entertainment ==
The town's main visual arts and entertainment venue, the Presentation Arts Centre, is situated on the site of a former convent. Officially opened in 2012, it is a fully accessible multi-use arts venue which is developed and promoted by the Wexford Arts Centre and Wexford County Council. The Presentation Arts Centre's theatre space retains most of the features of the original 19th century convent church, including original stained glass windows, ornate timber ceiling, original wishbone floor, and several decorative arches. The Presentation Arts Centre hosts numerous exhibitions per year, with particular emphasis on supporting and promoting emerging artists.

Enniscorthy is the home of the Wexford Carol, a Christmas song dating back to the 16th century or possibly much earlier.

In literature, Enniscorthy is mentioned in the Ithaca chapter of James Joyce's Ulysses (p. 812) as a flyleaf note in a book belonging to Leopold Bloom, where it is described as "Ennifcorthy, County Wexford, the finest place in the world" (sic).

Enniscorthy is also the home of Eilis Lacey, the central character of the novel Brooklyn and its film adaptation. In the story, which is set in the early 1950s, Eilis travels alone from Enniscorthy to Brooklyn because of the lack of opportunities for her at home. Most, if not all, of the Enniscorthy scenes in the film were filmed in Enniscorthy, with multiple locations in the town being credited.

== Economy ==
The current economy of Enniscorthy is a mix of sectors including food production (such as Slaney Foods), engineering (such as Aircon Mech), ICT (such as Taoglas), financial services (such as Opus Funds), life sciences (such as Becton Dickinson), hospitality (such as Riverside Park Hotel) and construction (including high performance buildings through the NZEB Training Centre.

=== Davies Distillery ===
As early as 1824 Francis Davies, a miller, operated a spirit business from his mill in Enniscorthy. Davies then employed John Mullaly as a distiller. Mullaly had previously worked as a distiller with John McKenzie & Co in Mill Street Belfast. When the temperance reformer Theobald Mathew campaigned against alcohol, many distilleries in Ireland closed. After the Davies distillery closed, Mullaly and his family cast their lots together and emigrated to Australia on the Salsette in 1840.

=== George Killian's Red ===
Enniscorthy was the location of a regional microbrewery opened in 1864 and owned by the descendants of George Killian Lett. During their operation, Killian's ale was sold almost entirely in Wexford county. GH Lett Company still operates today, but no longer brews its own products. They now focus on wholesale to shops, bars and hotels. Killian's Red is still sold abroad, and the brand is currently held by Brasseries Pelforth, S. A.

=== Pottery ===
Carley's Bridge Pottery is one of Ireland's oldest potteries, having made earthen pots for over three hundred years. Paddy Murphy was also an Enniscorthy potter and in 1980 founded Hill View pottery adjacent to his home and close to Carley's Bridge Pottery. The cul de sac "Potters' Way" is named after him — as he would walk that route to his home. Since his passing, Hill View pottery has been taken over by his relation Derek O'Rourke.

=== Enterprise Centre ===
Enniscorthy Enterprise & Technology Centre provides business support, training and incubation space for start-ups and small and medium enterprises.

== Transport ==
Enniscorthy is well connected by 121 km of motorway directly to Dublin. The Enniscorthy Bypass project, which was officially opened on 18 July 2019, also includes a single carriageway that connects the N30 with the M11, significantly reducing journey times to Waterford.

Enniscorthy railway station is on the Dublin–Rosslare line. The line terminates at Dublin Connolly in the northern direction, whilst in the southern direction it runs to Rosslare Europort, where it connects with the Stena Line ferry to Fishguard Harbour. There are also Irish Ferries connections from Rosslare Europort to Pembroke and Cherbourg. The station opened on 16 November 1863.

The town's major bus stop can be found in Templeshannon, with many routes serving it. Bus Éireann operates Expressway route 2, connecting the town with Dublin Airport, Dublin, Arklow, Gorey and Wexford. Bus Éireann also operate routes 132, 375 and 377, however these routes only run once/twice per week. Wexford Bus operates route 740, connecting the town with Dublin Airport, Dublin, Gorey and Wexford, as well as route 376, connecting the town with Bunclody and Carlow. Connections to other routes for destinations such as Waterford and Wicklow can be made in Wexford and Gorey. TFI Local Link Wexford operate routes 359, 368, 369, and 384 connecting the town with New Ross, Clonroche, Kiltealy, Bree, Wexford, Tullow and Bunclody.

== Sport ==
The local Gaelic Athletic Association (GAA) clubs include the Shamrocks and the Rapparees/Starlights. These two town-based clubs compete in both hurling and Gaelic football. St. Patrick's Park is the name of the local GAA grounds.

There are 5 soccer clubs in the town: Ajax Athletic, Moyne Rangers, Shamrock Rovers, Enniscorthy Town and Enniscorthy United.

Enniscorthy Rugby Club was founded in 1912 and competes in the All Ireland League (AIL).

== People ==
- Wallis Bird, singer
- Irish Mythen, singer
- Martin Cash, a transported convict who became a bushranger in Van Diemen's Land (now Tasmania, Australia) was born in Enniscorthy in 1808
- Anthony Cronin, poet and biographer of Flann O'Brien and Samuel Beckett, is a native of Enniscorthy
- Maria Doyle Kennedy, Irish singer and actress who lived in the town as a child
- Festy Ebosele, footballer who plays for Udinese
- Lystus Ebosele, aka Cyclone, is an Irish champion powerlifter and the first-ever Irish Gladiator, known for her incredible strength and speed
- James Esmond (1822–1890), pioneering gold prospector in Australia, Eureka Rebellion leader
- William Henry Grattan Flood (1859–1928), a prolific author, historian and musicologist, resided in Enniscorthy from 1895 until his death in 1928
- Eileen Gray was born in Brownswood and later became famous as a furniture designer and architect
- Daryl Jacob, jockey and rider of the winning horse in the 2012 Aintree Grand National is from Enniscorthy
- Bill Lacey, dual international footballer, who played for both Liverpool F.C. and Everton FC in the early 20th century
- Adam Nolan, a welterweight boxer who represented Ireland at the 2012 Olympics
- Seamus Rafter, Irish revolutionary
- Colm Tóibín, born in the town, has written several novels set in the area
- Brothers Charles (1836–1912) and Richard Reeves (1836–1910), who emigrated to New Zealand, were born in Enniscorthy. Charles became a prominent businessman, and Richard became a politician.
- Gerard Whelan, author, was born and lives in Enniscorthy
- Paul Kehoe, politician, former Minister for Defense

== International relations ==
Enniscorthy is twinned with Gimont in France. Enniscorthy was also the host town of the team and supporters from Canada during the 2003 Special Olympics.

== See also ==
- Battle of Vinegar Hill, 1798
- List of towns and villages in Ireland
- List of market houses in Ireland
