= 1869 Roslyn by-election =

New Zealand by-election

The 1869 Roslyn by-election was a by-election for the electorate of Roslyn in Dunedin on 12 February 1869 during the 4th New Zealand Parliament.

The by-election resulted from the resignation of the previous member George Hepburn on 9 January 1869.

The by-election was won by Henry Driver who defeated Colin Allen by 215 votes to 89, giving him a majority of 126 votes. In his acceptance speech Driver doubted if the result would be received with pleasure by the Government in Wellington. Driver got a majority of votes in North East Valley, Mornington and Caversham, while Allen got a majority of votes in his home district of Kaikorai.

== Results ==
The following table gives the election results:

1869 Roslyn by-election
| Party | Candidate | Votes | % | ±% |
|---|---|---|---|---|
| Independent | Henry Driver | 215 | 70.72 | |
| Independent | Colin Allan | 89 | 29.28 | |
| Turnout | | 304 | | |
| Majority | | 126 | 41.45 | |
