= Charles Reeves =

Charles Reeves may refer to:

- Charles Reeves (businessman)
- Charles Reeves (architect)
