= Lett's Brewery =

Irish beer manufacturer

Lett's Brewery (officially Mill Park Brewery) was a beer manufacturer based in Enniscorthy, County Wexford, Ireland. It opened in 1864.

Owned by G.H. Lett & Co., Ltd. which still remains a wholesale beverage distributor in Ireland, the brewery halted beer production in 1956. It was the last small independent brewery in Ireland. However, since 1981 Lett's allowed its famous Enniscorthy Ruby Ale to be brewed under license by Coors of Colorado, United States. It is now marketed as Killian's Irish Red. When first introduced by Coors, it was labeled as an "ale". After a year or two, it was re-branded (and by some accounts, reformulated) as a "lager".

In France, a similar beer was marketed beginning in the 1960s by Pelforth as George Killian's Biere Rousse.

== Abbey ==
Lett's Brewery is located at a former abbey site, the original bell is said to remain today. The Enniscorthy friary site is located just off the present Abbey Square. It was founded in 1460 and suppressed in 1540. The last three friars were killed when the friary was plundered by Sir Henry Wallop in 1582. Friars returned to the abbey between 1642 and 1650, and again from 1661 on then fades into obscurity around 1750.
