= Alexander Bathgate =

Alexander Bathgate (4 August 1845 – 9 September 1930) was a New Zealand lawyer, company director, writer and conservationist. He was born in Peebles, Peeblesshire, Scotland on 4 August 1845. He was the son of John Bathgate. When Alexander was 18 years old, and was studying at the University of Edinburgh he migrated to Dunedin with his parents, brother and sisters. He was admitted as a barrister and solicitor in 1872. In 1909 he retired.
