= Enniscorthy Castle =

- Caisleán Inis Córthaidh (Irish)
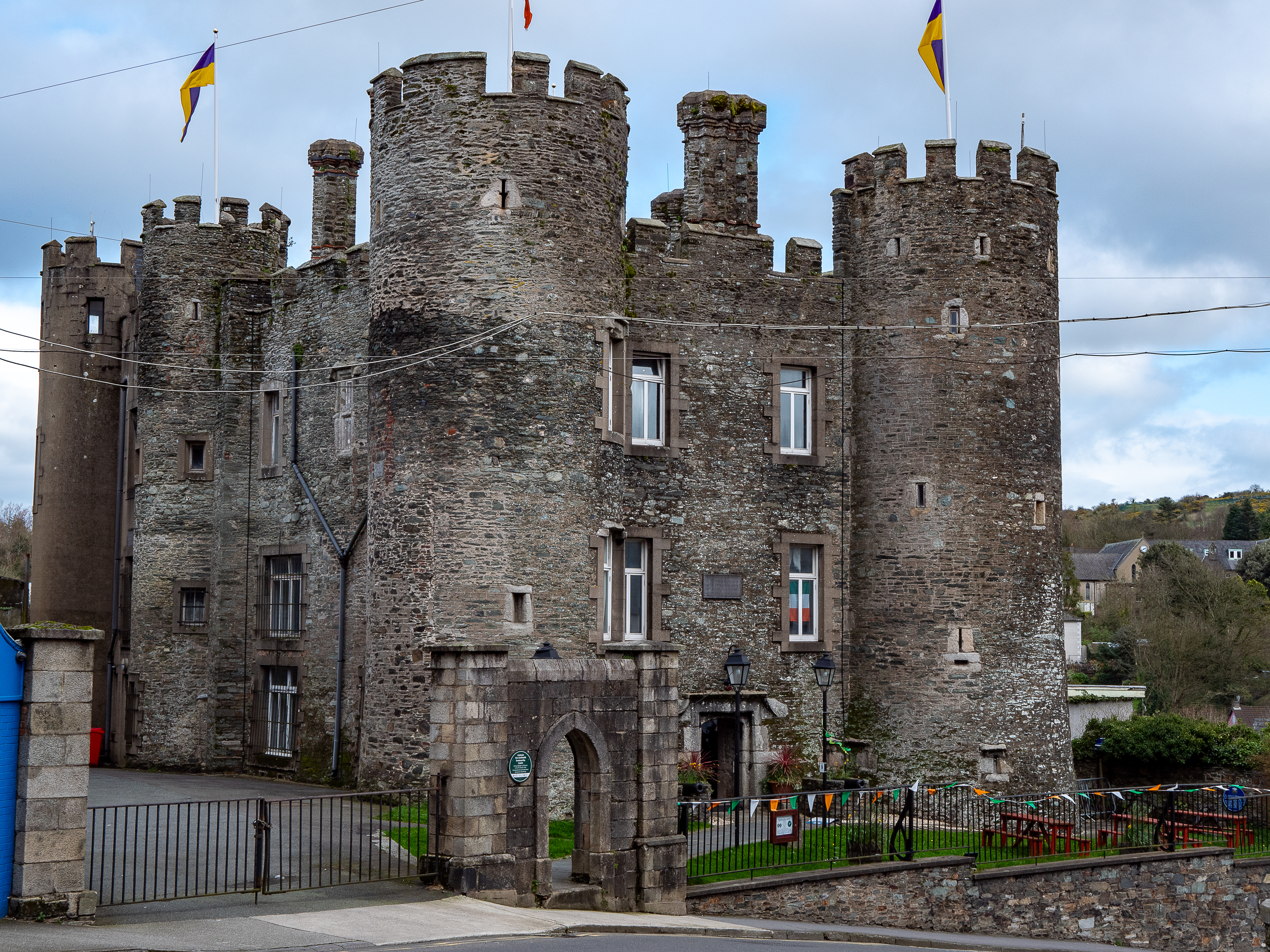

- Location within Ireland
- 52°30′05″N 6°34′02″W
- Location: Enniscorthy, County Wexford, Ireland

History
- Built: 1199–1203

Site notes
- Architect(s): Norman origin & design

Enniscorthy Castle is situated in Enniscorthy, County Wexford, Ireland. Construction on the castle commenced in the late 1190s and was first occupied by its Norman owners in 1203 A.D. on the site of a previous wooden castle they had erected some years earlier. It was built by Philip De Prendergast.

== History ==
The first stone castle was built on site in the 1190s by the Anglo-Norman knight Philip De Prendergast and his wife Maud. Philip, Maud and their Norman descendants resided at the castle until the 1370s. Art MacMurrough Kavanagh attacked Enniscorthy Castle in the 1370s, in an attempt to regain his ancestral land. Art was successful, taking it in battle from the last Norman knight and owner of the castle who’s surname was Meyler and the MacMurrough Kavanagh dynasty then held the castle until 1536, when they surrendered the castle and surrounding lands to the saxon Lord Leonard Grey. Enniscorthy Castle was partially burnt by the Earl of Kildare in 1569.

In 1581, Queen Elizabeth I handed the land to poet Edmund Spenser, though he never took up residence there. Later, during the Elizabethan plantations the castle was 'owned' by Henry Wallop, who extended and refurbished the castle extensively. The castle was later occupied by Cromwellian forces in 1649, retaken by Irish Confederates and Monarchists and then lost again to the Cromwellians. It was used as a prison during the 1798 Rebellion, by the Irish 'United Irishmen' and then by the British after they re-took Enniscorthy town.

In 1903, it became the private residence of the Roche family, who rented it until they vacated it in 1951. In the years following it became home to the Wexford County Museum.

The castle closed for refurbishments in 2006 and reopened in 2011.

Today, Enniscorthy Castle explores the development of the castle and the town of Enniscorthy from its earliest French-Norman origins.

== Features ==
The castle site at the head of the River Slaney, in the centre of Enniscorthy town. As a Norman Castle, it features four corner towers, and a four-storey rectangular keep. The original foundation of a castle on this site goes back to the late 12th or early 13th century, though the current structure was updated in the late 1500s. Enniscorthy Castle appears to echo the style of other local castles, such as the Norman Ferns Castle and Carlow Castle. The Castle had fallen into ruins by the early 20th century, and was restored by P.J. Roche, who extended and reconstructed the building.

== Wexford County Museum ==
For many years the castle was home of the Wexford County Museum. The castle was closed for extensive refurbishment in 2006, which saw the collections taken into the care of the local authority. Enniscorthy Castle reopened in 2011.

Today, the museum explores the development of the castle itself and town from its earliest French-Norman origins, with a special focus on the castle as a family home. Some of the objects of the older Wexford County Museum displays are also featured.

=== Denys Cobett-Wilson ===
There is a memorial plaque within the castle grounds noting details of the first flight across the Irish Sea, by Denys Corbett-Wilson.
