= William Downie Stewart Jr =

New Zealand politician and writer (1878–1949)

The Honourable William Downie Stewart Jr
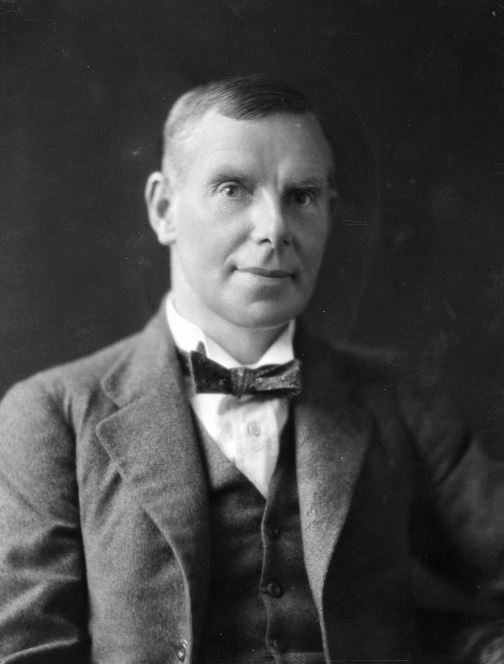

24th Minister of Finance
- In office 24 May 1926 – 10 December 1928
- Prime Minister: Gordon Coates
- Preceded by: William Nosworthy
- Succeeded by: Joseph Ward
- In office 22 September 1931 – 28 January 1933
- Prime Minister: George Forbes
- Preceded by: George Forbes
- Succeeded by: Gordon Coates

13th Attorney-General
- In office 18 January 1926 – 24 May 1926
- Prime Minister: Gordon Coates
- Preceded by: Francis Bell
- Succeeded by: Frank Rolleston
- In office 22 September 1931 – 28 January 1933
- Prime Minister: George Forbes
- Preceded by: Thomas Sidey
- Succeeded by: George Forbes

27th Minister of Justice
- In office 26 November 1928 – 10 December 1928
- Prime Minister: Gordon Coates
- Preceded by: Frank Rolleston
- Succeeded by: Thomas Wilford

12th Minister of Police
- In office 26 November 1928 – 10 December 1928
- Prime Minister: Gordon Coates
- Preceded by: Frank Rolleston
- Succeeded by: Thomas Wilford

16th Minister of Defence
- In office 28 November 1928 – 10 December 1928
- Prime Minister: Gordon Coates
- Preceded by: Frank Rolleston
- Succeeded by: Thomas Wilford

30th Minister of Customs
- In office 9 March 1921 – 10 December 1928
- Prime Minister: Francis Bell; Gordon Coates
- Preceded by: William Herries
- Succeeded by: William Taverner
- In office 22 September 1931 – 28 January 1933
- Prime Minister: George Forbes
- Preceded by: George Forbes
- Succeeded by: Gordon Coates

8th Minister of Industries and Commerce
- In office 13 January 1923 – 24 May 1926
- Prime Minister: William Massey; Francis Bell; Gordon Coates
- Preceded by: Ernest Lee
- Succeeded by: Alex McLeod

6th Minister of Revenue
- In office 24 May 1926 – 10 December 1928
- Prime Minister: Gordon Coates
- Preceded by: William Nosworthy
- Succeeded by: Joseph Ward
- In office 22 September 1931 – 28 January 1933
- Prime Minister: George Forbes
- Preceded by: George Forbes
- Succeeded by: Gordon Coates

1st Minister of Statistics
- In office February 1922 – 27 June 1923
- Prime Minister: William Massey
- Preceded by: Position established
- Succeeded by: Richard Bollard

7th Minister of Internal Affairs
- In office 1 March 1921 – 27 June 1923
- Prime Minister: William Massey
- Preceded by: George James Anderson
- Succeeded by: Richard Bollard

Member of the New Zealand Parliament for Dunedin West
- In office 1914–1935

Mayor of Dunedin
- In office 1913–1914

Personal details
- Born: 29 July 1878 Dunedin, New Zealand
- Died: 29 September 1949 (aged 71) Dunedin, New Zealand
- Party: Reform
- Parent: William Downie Stewart Sr (father)

William Downie Stewart (29 July 1878 – 29 September 1949) was a New Zealand Finance Minister, Mayor of Dunedin and writer.

== Early life ==
Stewart was born in Dunedin in 1878. His father was William Downie Stewart, a lawyer and politician. His mother was Rachel Hepburn, daughter of George Hepburn. One of his four siblings was Rachelina (Rachel) Hepburn Armitage. Stewart's mother died within months of his birth, leaving him and his four siblings to be raised by nannies and nurses. From 1888 to 1894, he attended Otago Boys' High School and continued his studies at the University of Otago.

== Political career ==
New Zealand Parliament
Years	Term	Electorate	Party
1914–1919	19th	Dunedin West	Reform
1919–1922	20th	Dunedin West	Reform
1922–1925	21st	Dunedin West	Reform
1925–1928	22nd	Dunedin West	Reform
1928–1931	23rd	Dunedin West	Reform
1931–1935	24th	Dunedin West	Reform

Downie Stewart was the author of a number of books. He and the American economist James Edward Le Rossignol of the University of Denver published State socialism in New Zealand in 1910. A reviewer called the book "an illuminating study of the remarkable series of instructive experiments in socialistic legislation, for which New Zealand has become conspicuous, together with that Australian Commonwealth, which is its nearest neighbour."

Downie Stewart was Mayor of Dunedin (1913–1914). He represented the Dunedin West electorate from 1914 to 1935. His father had previously represented the Dunedin West electorate.

=== Minister of Finance and resignation ===
Downie Stewart was Finance Minister in 1931–1933. He resigned after the devaluation of the New Zealand currency, a measure he opposed. Downie Stewart stood in the 1935 general election as an independent United-Reform Coalition candidate, losing to Labour's Dr Gervan McMillan.

In July 1934, he became the first chairman of the newly formed New Zealand Institute of International Affairs, the local branch of Chatham House. He ceded that position to Bill Barnard, the speaker of the House, the NZIIA merged with the local branch of the Institute of Pacific Relations in late 1939.

In 1935, he was awarded the King George V Silver Jubilee Medal.

== Notes ==
Political offices
Preceded by Francis Bell	Attorney-General; 1926; 1931–1933	Succeeded by Frank Rolleston
Preceded by Thomas Sidey	Attorney-General; 1926; 1931–1933	Succeeded by George Forbes
Preceded by Frank Rolleston	Minister of Justice; 1928	Succeeded by Thomas Wilford
Preceded by Frank Rolleston	Minister of Police; 1928	Succeeded by Thomas Wilford
