= John Bathgate =

New Zealand politician

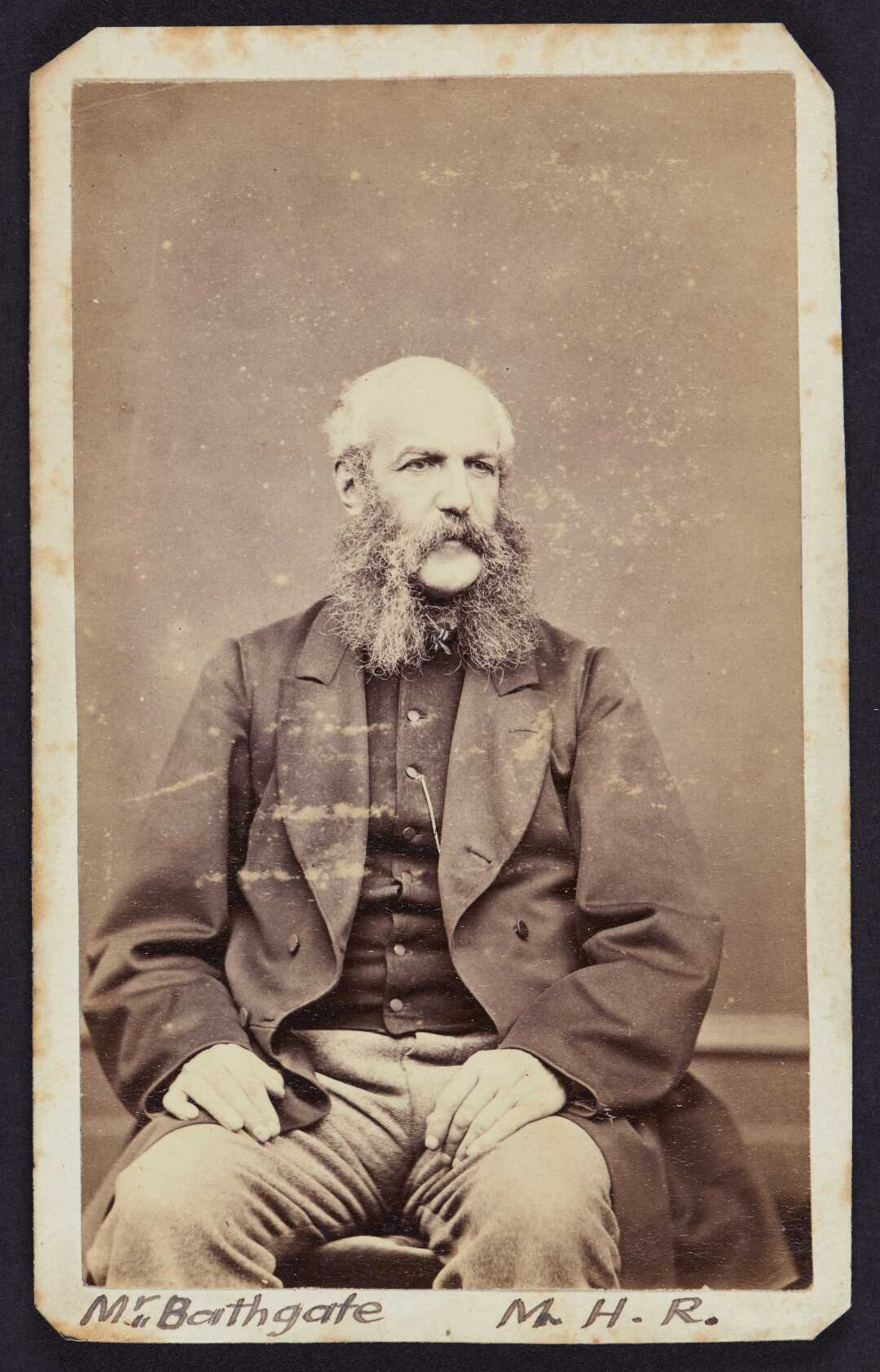
John Bathgate, c. 1873

John Bathgate (10 August 1809 – 21 September 1886) was a New Zealand politician, and Minister of Justice and Commissioner of Stamps from 1872 to 1874.

== Life ==
New Zealand Parliament
Years	Term	Electorate	Party
1871–1874	5th	City of Dunedin	Independent
1881–1884	8th	Roslyn	Independent

Bathgate was born in Edinburgh in 1809. While a boy, the family moved to Peebles where his father had a teaching position. After school, he went to West Scotland to act as a private secretary and then to Edinburgh for an apprenticeship. At age 33, he married Miss Anderson. After her death, he married Miss McLaren. He had three sons, nine daughters, and (at the time of his death) 27 grandchildren.

In his early 30s, Bathgate became town clerk in Peebles. Bathgate was the principal promoter of the Peebles Railway.

He was chosen by English backers as manager for the new Bank of Otago and emigrated to New Zealand within months. There was a great depression during the mid-1860s and Bathgate had lost money to the Commercial Banking Co., and had allowed the Southland Provincial Council to overdraw well beyond the agreed limit. These events put an end to Bathgate's banking career.

From June 1871 to November 1872, he served on the Executive Council of the Otago Province.

He represented two Dunedin electorates in the House of Representatives, first the City of Dunedin electorate from 1871 to 1874, when he resigned to take up the offer by Premier Julius Vogel of resident magistrate in Dunedin and district judge for Otago, and the Roslyn electorate from 1881 to 1884, when he was defeated. He was a member of the New Zealand Legislative Council from 15 May 1885 to 21 September 1886, when he died. He was buried at Dunedin Northern Cemetery.

He was the father of Alexander Bathgate. John Denniston was his son-in-law.

== Notes ==
New Zealand Parliament
Preceded by Thomas Birch	Member of Parliament for City of Dunedin; 1871–1874; Served alongside: William Reynolds	Succeeded by Nathaniel Wales
Preceded by Henry Driver	Member of Parliament for Roslyn; 1881–1884	Succeeded by Archibald Hilson Ross
Political offices
Preceded by Henry Sewell	Minister of Justice; 1872–1874	Succeeded by Maurice O'Rorke
