= 1878 Roslyn by-election =

New Zealand by-election

The 1878 Roslyn by-election was a by-election for the electorate of Roslyn on 29 July 1878 in Dunedin during the 6th New Zealand Parliament.

The by-election resulted from the resignation of the previous member Arthur John Burns on 28 June 1878.

The by-election was won by Henry Driver, who had previously held the seat from 1869 to 1871.

He was opposed by Archibald Hilson Ross, who claimed that Driver (who denied it) "shouted" electors with drinks. Ross represented Roslyn from 1884 to 1890 and was Mayor of Dunedin from 1880 to 1881.

== Results ==
The following table gives the election results:

1878 Roslyn by-election
| Party | Candidate | Votes | % | ±% |
|---|---|---|---|---|
| Independent | Henry Driver | 335 | 60.47 | |
| Independent | Archibald Hilson Ross | 219 | 39.53 | |
| Turnout | | 554 | | |
| Majority | | 116 | 20.94 | |
