= Enniscorthy Market House =

Municipal building in Enniscorthy, County Wexford, Ireland

- Teach an Mhargaidh Inis Córthaidh
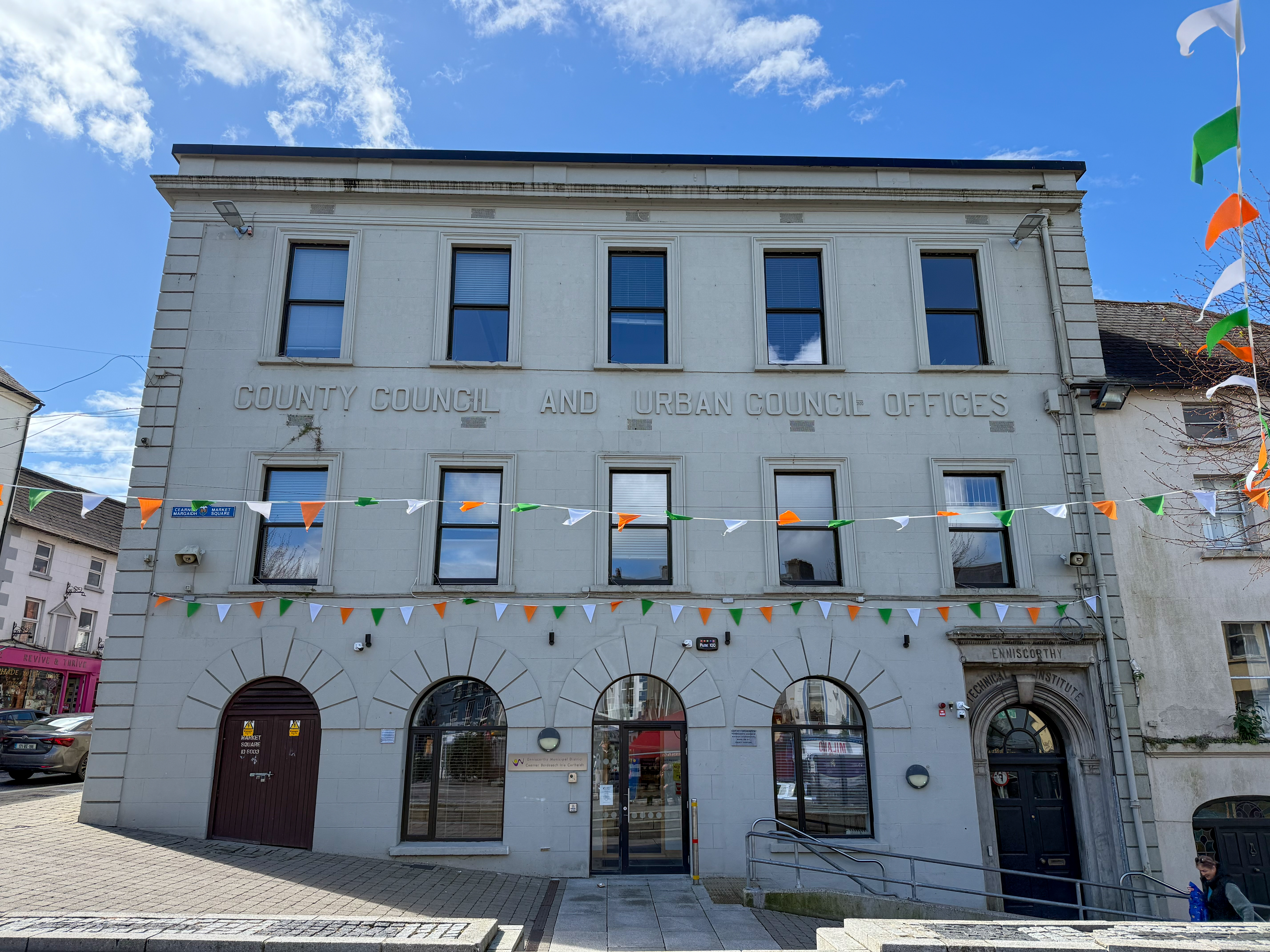
- Enniscorthy Market House

- Location within Ireland

General information
- Architectural style: Neoclassical style
- Location: Market Square, Enniscorthy, Ireland
- Coordinates: 52.5019°N 6.5693°W
- Completed: c. 1795

Design and construction
- Architect: Thomas Aloysius Burke Lowey (early 20th century reconstruction)

Enniscorthy Market House (Irish: Teach an Mhargaidh Inis Córthaidh), also known as The County Council and Urban Council Offices (Irish: Oifigí na Comhairle Contae agus na Comhairle Uirbeach), is a municipal building in the Market Square, Enniscorthy, County Wexford, Ireland. The building, which was used as the local market house through much of its life, is now used as a civic building.

== History ==
The building was commissioned as a market house by the lord of the manor, John Wallop, 3rd Earl of Portsmouth, whose ancestors had been the principal landowners in the area since the late 16th century. It was designed in the neoclassical style, built in brick with a cement render finish and was completed in the late 18th century.

The original design involved a symmetrical main frontage of five bays facing onto the Market Square. It was arcaded on the ground floor so that markets could be held, with an assembly room on the first floor. There were five round-headed openings with voussoirs and keystones on the ground floor, and five sash windows with window sills and architraves on the first floor. The two-storey structure had quoins at the corners and was surmounted by a hipped roof. Internally, the principal room was the assembly room on the first floor, which was used for concerts and public meetings from an early stage.

During the battle of Enniscorthy, in May 1798, the rebel forces set fire to much of the town causing panic among local people: a loyalist, Thomas Rigley, was burned to death in the building. Meanwhile, a guard was mounted over a stockpile of arms and ammunition which was being stored there. The local Protestant minister, Richard Radcliffe, recorded that the assembly room was being used as a school by 1813.

In 1908, an additional floor was added to the building, to a design by Thomas Aloysius Burke Lowey, to accommodate the local technical school. The building was further adapted, in 1973, for municipal use as the offices of Enniscorthy Urban District Council. The building continued to be used as the offices of the urban district council until 2002, and then as the offices of the successor town council, but ceased to be the local seat of government in 2014, when the council was dissolved and administration of the town was amalgamated with Wexford County Council in accordance with the Local Government Reform Act 2014.

An extensive programme of refurbishment works, involving the creation of additional public space, was undertaken by Tom O'Brien Construction to a design by Aughey O'Flaherty Architects and completed in November 2020.
