= Oregon Emergency Board =

- State of Oregon

Type
- Type: Joint committee of the Oregon Legislature

History
- Founded: 1913

Leadership
- President of the Oregon Senate: Rob Wagner
- Speaker of the Oregon House: Julie Fahey

Structure
- Seats: 20
- Length of term: Interim between legislative sessions
- Authority: Oregon Constitution

Oregon's Emergency Board (also known as the State Emergency Board and Legislative Emergency Board) is a statutory legislative committee composed of members of both houses of the Oregon Legislative Assembly. It has broad powers to allocate general fund resources, lottery revenue, and other state funds for unanticipated government requirements when the state legislature is not in session. The board can authorize an agency to overspend its approved budget or approve a new budget amount for specific agency tasks. It can also authorize the transfers of funds between agencies or budget accounts. The Emergency Board is jointly chaired by the President of the Oregon Senate and the Speaker of the Oregon House of Representatives.

== Responsibility ==
The Emergency Board is a powerful committee of the state legislature that functions during interim periods when the state's legislative is out of sessions. Because Oregon's legislature only meets for limited periods during its biennial cycle, the period between sessions can last many months. In the past, many legislative interims have lasted 18 months or more.

The state Emergency Board is responsible for adjusting the state budget to cover emergency requirements when the full legislature is out of session. The board can allocate or transfer funds to state agencies beyond the original appropriated amount when required. It can allocate additional public funds for activities required by law when an existing appropriation made by the legislature is not sufficient to cover the actual requirement. The board can also approve funding for new requirements that arise unexpectedly after the legislature has passed the state's budget and is no longer in session.

The Emergency Board is authorized by Article III, Section 3 of the Oregon Constitution and is established in law under Oregon statute ORS 291.326. The statute outlines the following responsibilities and powers for the board:

(1) The Emergency Board, during the interim between sessions of the Legislative Assembly, may exercise the following powers:

(a) Where an emergency exists, to allocate to any state agency, out of any emergency fund that may be appropriated to the Emergency Board for that purpose, additional funds beyond the amount appropriated to the agency by the Legislative Assembly, or funds to carry on an activity required by law for which an appropriation was not made.
(b) Where an emergency exists, to authorize any state agency to expend, from funds dedicated or continuously appropriated for the uses and purposes of the agency, sums in excess of the amount of the budget of the agency as approved in accordance with law.
(c) In the case of a new activity coming into existence at such a time as to preclude the possibility of submitting a budget to the Legislative Assembly for approval, to approve, or revise and approve, a budget of the money appropriated for such new activity.
(d) Where an emergency exists, to revise or amend the budgets of state agencies to the extent of authorizing transfers between expenditure classifications within the budget of an agency.

(2) No allocation, authorization or approval under subsection (1)(a), (b) or (c) of this section shall be effective unless made at a meeting at which 10 members of the board were present.

(3) The laws enacted by the Legislative Assembly making appropriations and limiting expenditures, or either, are not intended to limit the powers of the Emergency Board.

== Membership and organization ==
The Emergency Board is co-chaired by the President of the Oregon Senate and the Speaker of the Oregon House of Representatives. The chairpersons of the Senate and House ways and means committees are also statutory members of the board. The rest of the 20-person board is made up of eight state senators appointed by the Senate President and eight members of the House appointed by the Speaker of the House. The eight appointed senators who serve on the board must be confirmed by a majority vote of the Senate and the eight members from the House must be confirmed by a majority of that chamber.

When the Oregon legislature is in session, the permanent Legislative Fiscal Office staff supports the joint committee on ways and means. During the interim period between legislative sessions, the office reports to the Emergency Board. The Legislative Fiscal Office is a non-partisan organization that does economic research, fiscal analysis, and identifies options for funding state agencies and programs. It also analyzes fiscal implications of proposed legislation for the joint ways and means committee, the Emergency Board, and other legislative committees.

During interim periods, Oregon's governor determines when a state agency requires additional funds. After making that determination, the governor submits a funding request to the Emergency Board for consideration. However, the board's co-chairs decide what action items are placed on the board's agenda. In addition to interim funding requests and related information submitted by the governor, the board co-chairs may request additional information or special reports from state agencies to support their deliberations.

== History ==
The state Emergency Board was created by the Oregon legislature in 1913. The board was intended to be available to provide emergency funding for state institutions or departments when the legislature was out of session. The original legislation made the Governor of Oregon, Oregon Secretary of State, Oregon State Treasurer, the President of the Senate, and the Speaker of the House members of the board along with the chairpersons of the House and Senate ways and means committees. Governor Oswald West vetoed the bill that proposed establishing the Emergency Board, but his veto was overridden by legislature and it became law.

The Emergency Board's first meeting was requested by Governor West in September 1913, just a few months after the legislative session that created the board ended. The governor requested additional funding for his War on Vice campaign which had quickly used up its appropriated funds. The Emergency Board allocated an additional $1,500 for the governor's program along with $5,000 to pay rewards to citizen who helped in the capture of criminals. At its first meeting, the board also provided $500 to continue the investigation of a Portland gas franchise. These actions established the Emergency Board as an effective institution for handling out-of-cycle funding requests.

In 1951, the Oregon Legislature passed a bill that took the governor, secretary of state, and state treasurer off the Emergency Board. The legislation replaced them with two House members and one state senator to be appointed by the Speaker of the House and the President of the Senate. Later that year, after 38 years of successfully using the Emergency Board to address funding issues between legislative sessions, Oregon's Attorney General, George Neuner, ruled that the Emergency Board was unconstitutional. To resolve this problem, the legislature submitted a constitutional amendment to Oregon's voters in the 1952 general election. To cover emergencies that might arise between the close of the 1951 legislative session and the 1952 election, the legislature authorized Governor Douglas McKay to spend up to $1.5 million for unexpected funding requirements. In the 1952 general election, Oregon voters approved incorporating the Emergency Board into the state constitution by a vote of 364,539 to 192,492. As a result, the Emergency Board was reestablished in 1953.

The Legislative Fiscal Office was established in 1959. The office was created to support the legislature's ways and means committees and the Emergency Board when the legislature is not in session. The office's non-partisan staff provided the Emergency Board with full-time professional expertise to analyze state programs, budget requirements, and expenditure issues.

In 2007, the Emergency Board was authorized to review and approve federal grant applications during legislative interim periods. Except in emergency situations, grant applications must be approval by the board before they are submitted to the federal agency overseeing the grant. Currently, grant application are submitted to the board through the Legislative Fiscal Office.

Today, the Emergency Board continues to fund critical programs that occur between Oregon's legislative sessions. For example, the board funded a wildfire recovery program in 2015. A year later, the board paid to test for lead in drinking water in schools across the state. That same year, the Oregon State Police asked the Emergency Board for an additional $2.5 million to cover the cost of the 41-day armed occupation of the Malheur National Wildlife Refuge in eastern Oregon. In that case, the board only authorized an additional $2 million for the state police and other agencies. Out-of-cycle requirements like these are typical of the funding issues addressed by the Emergency Board during the interim periods between Oregon's legislative sessions.
