= Vinegar Hill Windmill =

Ruined mill in County Wexford, Ireland

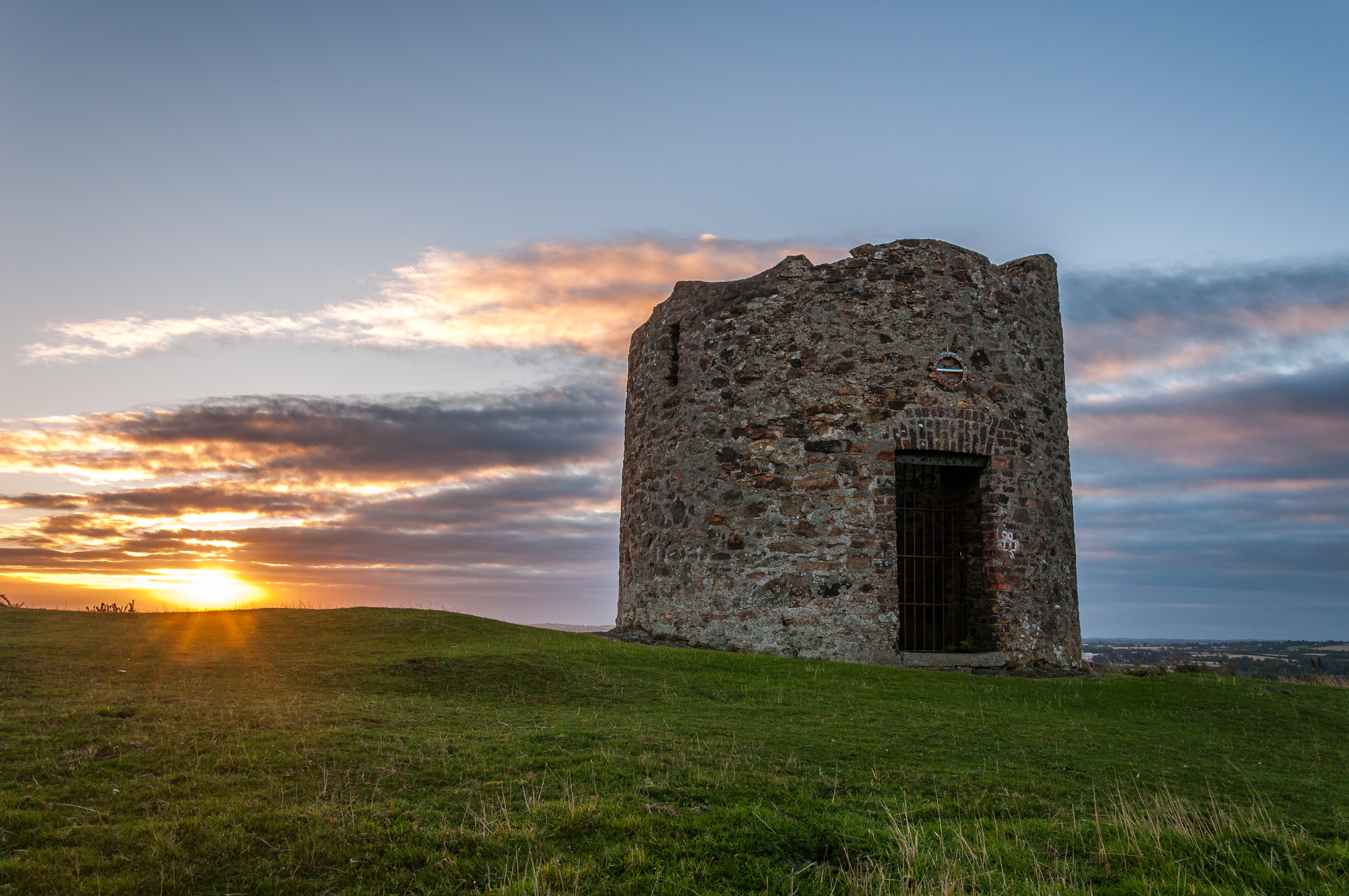

Origin
- Mill name: Vinegar Hill Windmill or Templeshannon Windmill
- Coordinates: 52°30′05″N 6°33′12″W
- Year built: 1600–1798

Information
- Purpose: Corn mill
- Type: Tower mill
- Storeys: Three storey tower
- No. of sails: Four
- Type of sails: Common sails
- Other information

National monument of Ireland
- Official name: Vinegar Hill
- Reference no.: 392

Vinegar Hill Windmill or Templeshannon Windmill is a tower mill on Vinegar Hill, Enniscorthy, County Wexford.

== History ==
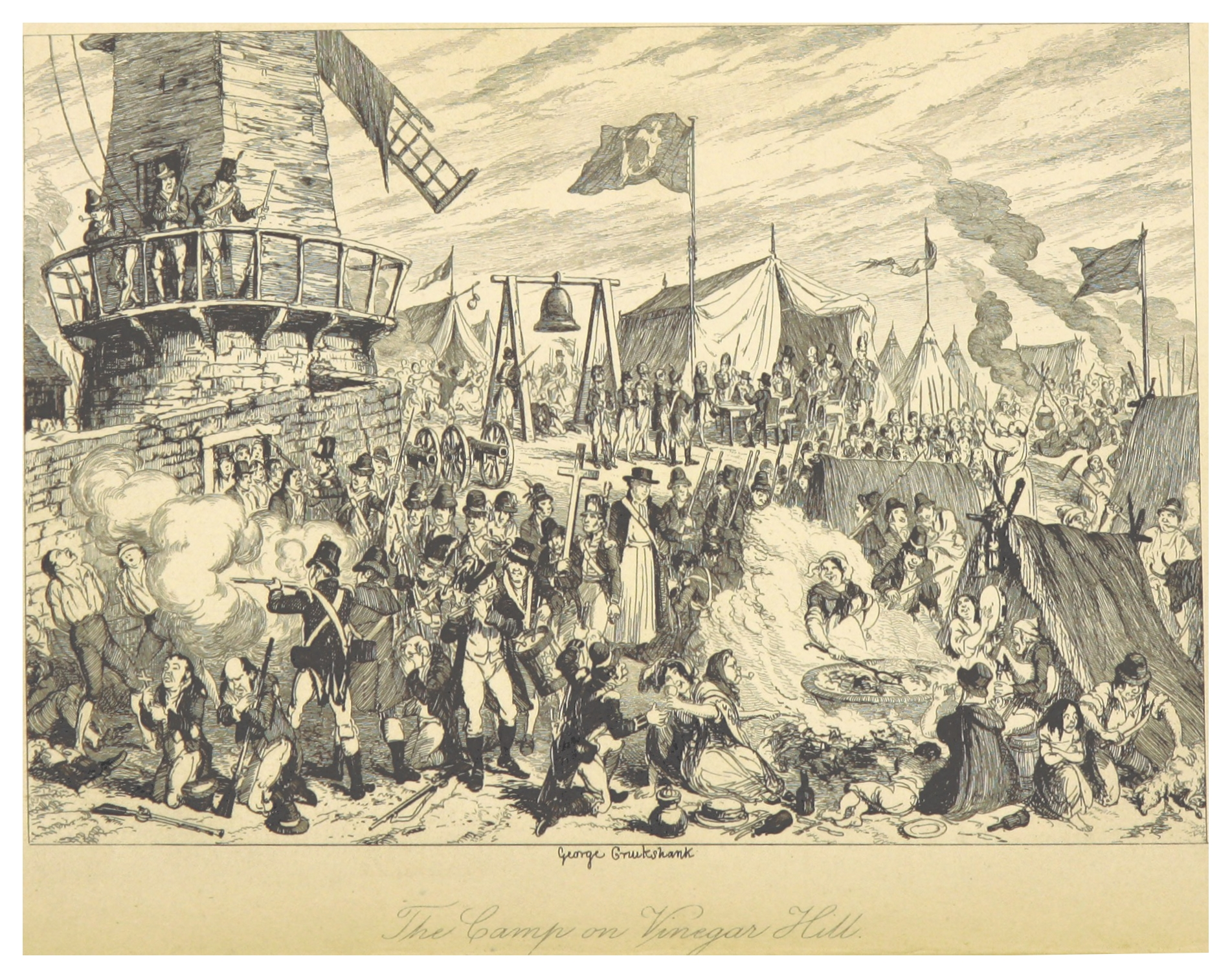
1798 Camp on Vinegar Hill by George Cruikshank showing the windmill

Vinegar Hill Windmill is a small-scale circular single-bay, single-stage windmill, dating from between 1600 and 1798. It sits on a piece of elevated ground, and is of a brick and dressed stone construction.

The windmill was the command centre for the Irish rebel camp during the 1798 Rebellion on Vinegar Hill, and they flew their banner from the windmill. When the rebels were defeated by General Gerald Lake on 21 June 1798, the banner was replaced with the English Royal Standard.

== Current use ==
It has been in ruins since before 1840, and most likely fell into disuse after the 1798 Rebellion. The windmill is currently an Irish National Monument (number 392), and was one of a number of post-1700 structures the Irish government considered de-listing from this status in 2011.

When the windmill fell into disrepair in the 1960s, a protest notice was affixed to it stating: "Vinegar Hill, scene of glorious battle in 1798 between Insurgents and British Crown Forces. Carefully maintained by British Government from 1803 to 1922. Abandoned by the Irish Office of Public Works when freedom obtained. Only historic monument in the care of Irish Government in Enniscorthy area. Thank God for it."

The windmill currently forms part of the larger National 1798 Rebellion Centre site, as part of the 1798 battlefield.
