= Seamus Rafter =

Irish Republican Brotherhood commander

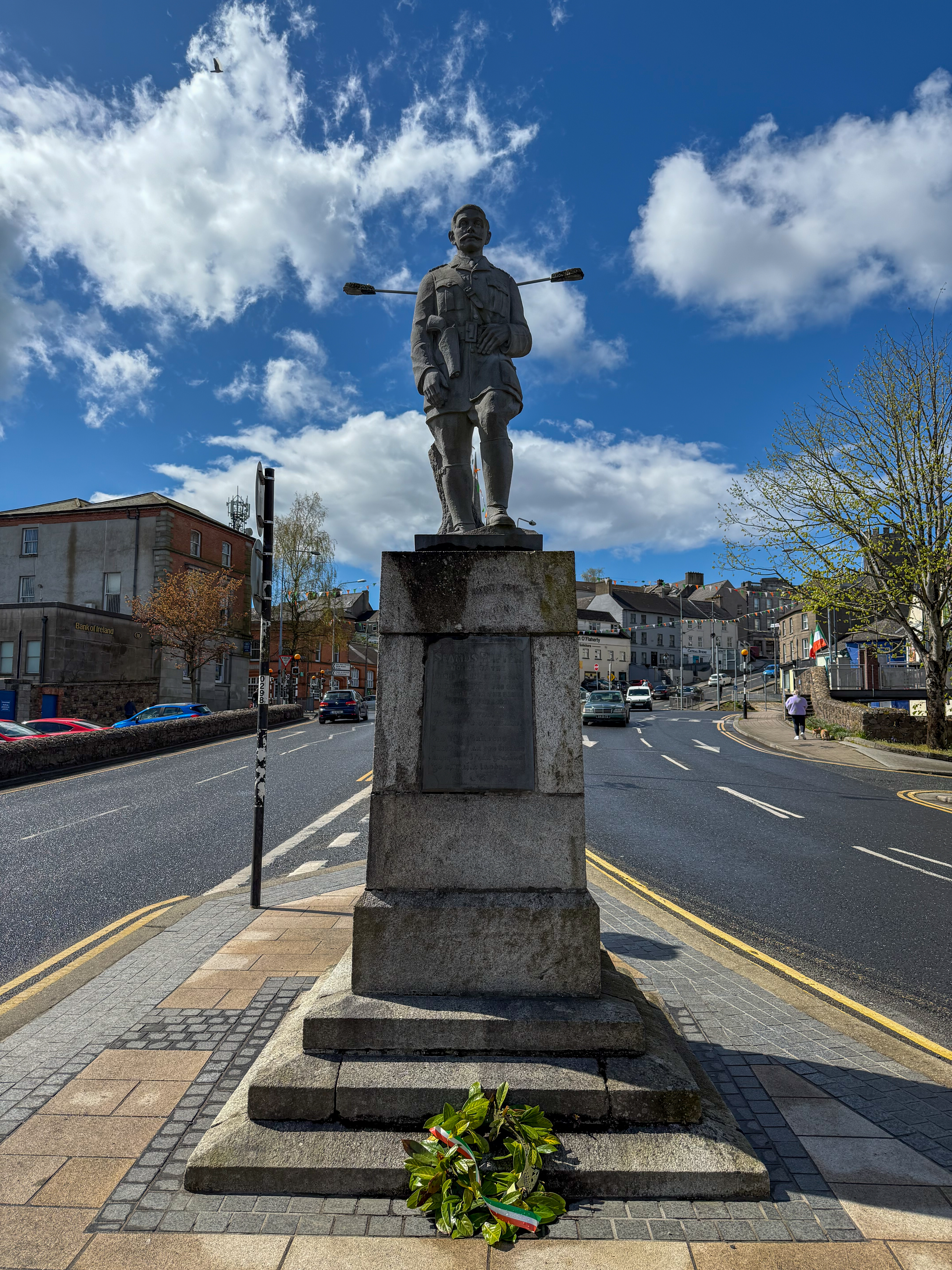
Statue of Seamus Rafter at Enniscorthy

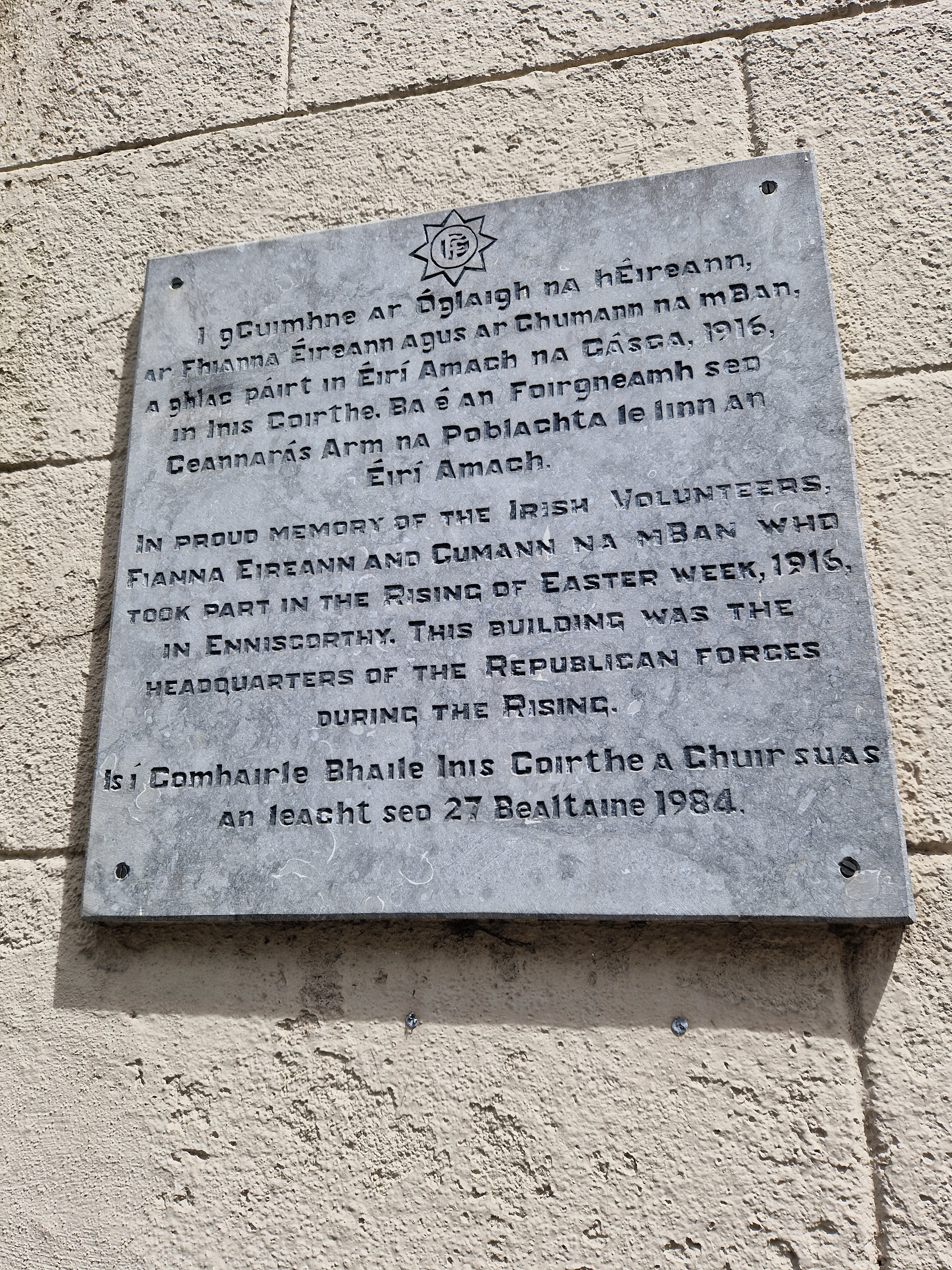
Plaque commemorating the Easter Rising in Enniscorthy, which Rafter commanded.

Seamus Rafter (24 January 1873 – 12 September 1918) was an Irishman who launched the Gaelic League in Enniscorthy, Wexford. He was a commander in the Wexford Brigade of the Irish Republican Brotherhood during the failed 1916 Easter Rising in Enniscorthy.

== Career ==
Rafter was born in Monalee, Ballindaggin, Ireland. After the 1916 Rebellion in Enniscorthy, he was incarcerated in England at Dartmoor prison and sentenced to death; this sentence was later commuted to five years' imprisonment.

After about one year, the rebels were released, and Rafter continued to recruit volunteers for his cause. He died on September the 12th 1918, of wounds he received from an accidental detonation of explosives he was manufacturing in his business premises which was intended to be used against the British forces. He was waked in Enniscorthy Cathedral, and a parade of Irish Volunteers and the public marched to his last resting place in Ballindaggin Cemetery, five miles from Enniscorthy. A commemoration of his life was held in 1949.

== Commemoration ==
In 1958, a granite statue of Rafter, representing participants in the Easter Rising, was erected in the Abbey Square in Enniscorthy.

Séamus Rafter Bridge in Enniscorthy, built in 1991, was named for him. As was Rafter Street, also in Enniscorthy.
