= Henry Driver =

New Zealand politician

New Zealand Parliament
Years	Term	Electorate	Party
1869–1870	4th	Roslyn	Independent
1871	5th	Roslyn	Independent
1878–1879	6th	Roslyn	Independent
1879–1881	7th	Roslyn	Independent
1881–1884	8th	Hokonui	Independent

Henry Driver (1831–23 Jan 1893) was a 19th-century Member of Parliament from Otago, New Zealand.

He was born in the United States, but as a young man emigrated to Victoria, Australia. When the Otago gold rush began in 1861 he established himself as a merchant in Dunedin. Later he joined with John Maclean to form Driver, Maclean & Co., auctioneers.

He represented the Roslyn electorate from 1869 to 1871, when he resigned, and from 1878 to 1881. He then represented the Hokonui electorate from 1881 to 1884, when he retired.

New Zealand Parliament
Preceded by George Hepburn	Member of Parliament for Roslyn; 1869–1871; 1878–1881	Succeeded by Edward McGlashan
Preceded by Arthur John Burns	Member of Parliament for Roslyn; 1869–1871; 1878–1881	Succeeded by John Bathgate
