= 1879 City of Dunedin by-election =

New Zealand by-election

The 1879 City of Dunedin by-election was a by-election held on 15 July 1879 in the City of Dunedin electorate in Dunedin during the 6th New Zealand Parliament.

The by-election was caused by the resignation of the incumbent, Robert Stout.

The winner of the by-election was William Downie Stewart Sr.

His opponent Charles Reeves "got the Catholic block vote" and religion in education was a factor in several by-elections in 1879 (e.g. in Auckland and Nelson).

== Results ==
1879 City of Dunedin by-election
Party	Candidate	Votes	%	±%
Independent	William Downie Stewart Sr	726	54.18	
Independent	Charles Reeves	563	42.01	
Independent	James Gordon Stuart Grant	51	3.81	
Turnout		1340		
Majority		163	12.16	
