= Roslyn (New Zealand electorate) =

Roslyn was a parliamentary electorate in the city of Dunedin in the Otago region of New Zealand from 1866 to 1890.

== Population centres ==
In the 1865 electoral redistribution, the House of Representatives focussed its review of electorates to South Island electorates only, as the Otago gold rush had caused significant population growth, and a redistribution of the existing population. Fifteen additional South Island electorates were created, including Roslyn, and the number of Members of Parliament was increased by 13 to 70.

Roslyn began as quite a large electorate, covering areas on the northern half of the Otago Peninsula as far east as St Leonards, Leith Valley, and western Dunedin suburbs including Roslyn. In the 1870 electoral redistribution, the area was reduced in the north (resulting in the loss of Leith Valley to Taieri) and south-west. In the 1875 electoral redistribution, the area that has been lost in the north was gained again. In the 1881 electoral redistribution, the area reduced significantly and comprised western suburbs only; St Leonards and Leith Valley were both lost at that time. In the 1887 electoral redistribution, the area was further adjusted, but the electorate continued to cover western Dunedin suburbs. In the 1890 electoral redistribution, the Roslyn electorate was abolished and most of its area went to the new Dunedin Suburbs electorate, with some small areas going to the three-member City of Dunedin electorate.

== History ==
George Hepburn, the electorate's first representative who was elected in 1866, resigned in 1869. Henry Driver replaced him. Arthur John Burns was elected in the 1875 general election, and resigned in 1878. He was succeeded by Driver, who started his second period of representation that year.

=== Election results ===
The electorate was represented by six Members of Parliament:

Key

Independent

Election	Winner
1866 election	George Hepburn
1869 by-election	Henry Driver
1871 election	Henry Driver
1871 by-election	Edward McGlashan
1875 election	Arthur John Burns
1878 by-election	Henry Driver
1879 election	Henry Driver
1881 election	John Bathgate
1884 election	Archibald Ross
1887 election	Archibald Ross

=== 1878 Roslyn by-election ===
1878 Roslyn by-election
Party	Candidate	Votes	%	±%
Independent	Henry Driver	335	60.47	
Independent	Archibald Hilson Ross	219	39.53	
Turnout		554		
Majority		116	20.94	

=== 1871 Roslyn by-election ===
1871 Roslyn by-election
Party	Candidate	Votes	%	±%
Independent	Edward McGlashan	240	54.67	
Independent	William Cutten	147	33.49	
Independent	John Cargill	52	11.85	
Independent	John Graham	13	2.96	
Independent	James McIndoe	6	1.37	
Majority		93	21.18	
Turnout		439		
