= Rachel Armitage (politician) =

American politician

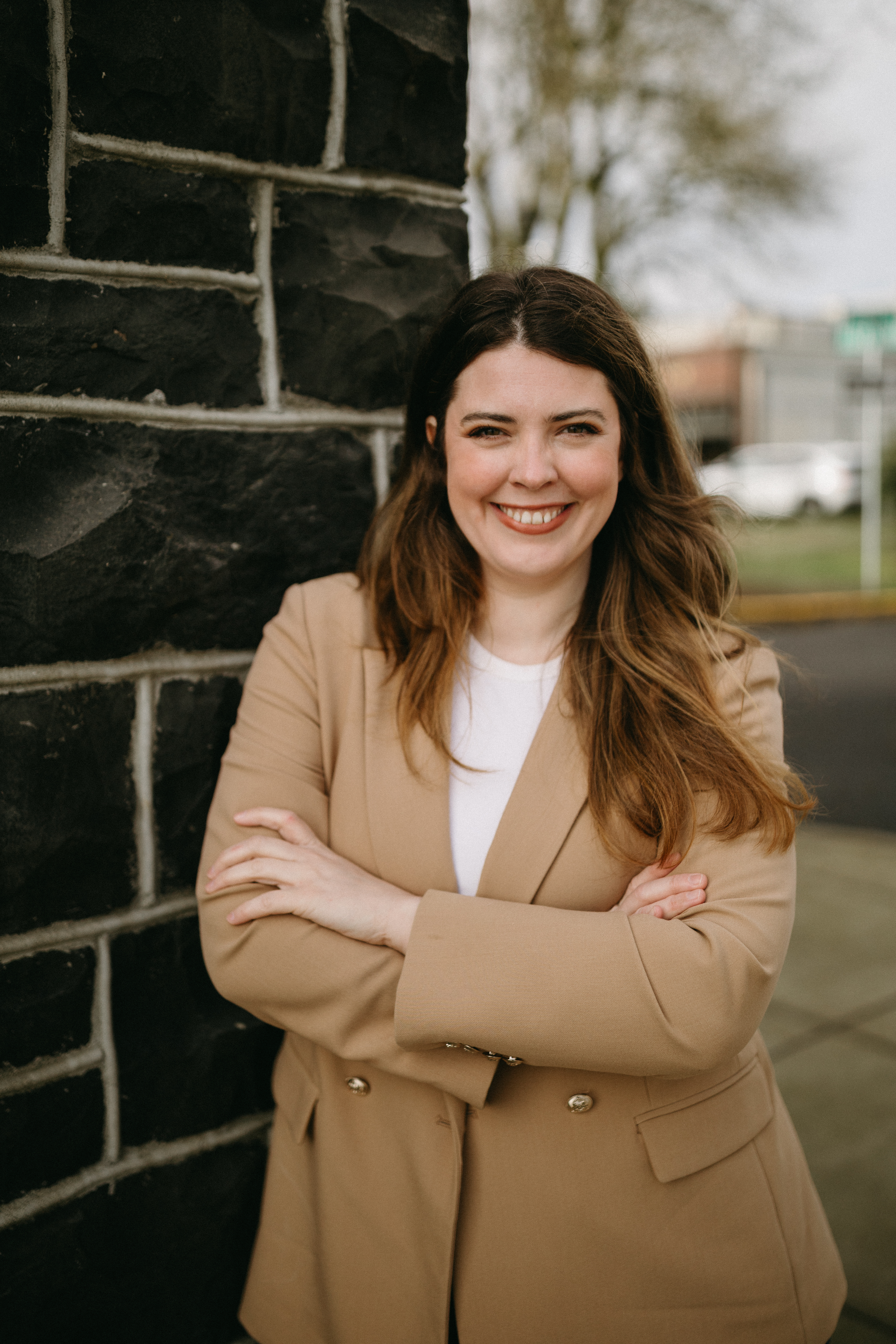

Member of the Oregon Senate from the 16th district
- In office January 14, 2022 – January 9, 2023
- Preceded by: Betsy Johnson
- Succeeded by: Suzanne Weber

Personal details
- Party: Democratic
- Education: University of Oregon

Rachel Armitage (née Gowland) is an American Democratic politician who served as a member of the Oregon State Senate from the 16th district, representing all of Clatsop, Columbia, and Tillamook Counties as well as portions of Multnomah, Washington, and Yamhill Counties. She was appointed to the position on January 14, 2022 and did not run for reelection in the 2022 election. She left office on January 9, 2023.

== Early life and education ==
Armitage graduated from the University of Oregon in 2015 with a Bachelor of Science degree in geography.

== Career ==
Earlier in her career, Armitage served as a staffer for members of the Oregon Legislative Assembly. She previously worked at Reed College, where she was also studying towards a master's degree. She later worked for the Oregon Community Foundation as a program officer.

=== State Senate ===
During her time in the Senate, Armitage served as a member of the Joint Ways and Means Subcommittee on General Government.

On February 19, 2026, Armitage announced her candidacy for the Senate seat she previously held.

== Personal life ==
Armitage lives in St. Helens, Oregon.

Armitage was previously married to Ree Armitage, a staffer for Oregon Senator Ron Wyden. Their joint petition for divorce was filed on March 18, 2025 and was finalized March 20, 2025 by Judge Denise Keppinger, who also ordered the case sealed from the public.

== Electoral history ==
Armitage won the May 19, 2026 Democratic primary with 85.14% of the vote. She faced Republican Courtney Bangs and Independent Party candidate Melisa Finkle in the November 2026 general election.

In October 2026, the Oregon Capital Chronicle reported that Armitage's campaign had raised $80,000 where Courtney Bangs had raised $540,600.
