= Charles Reeves (businessman) =

New Zealand businessman

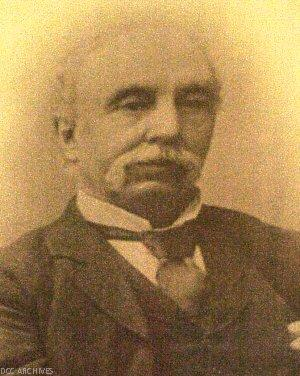

Charles Stephen Reeves (29 May 1836 – 29 November 1912) was a New Zealand businessman and former Mayor of Dunedin.

Born in Enniscorthy, County Wexford, Ireland in 1836, Reeves was educated at the Barrow and Tarvin schools in Cheshire. Having spent some time in the Liverpool office his father's shipping business, Reeves emigrated to Victoria, Australia, in approximately 1855 and worked as an accountant and commission agent in Ballarat and Geelong. Reeves later emigrated to Dunedin, New Zealand aboard the Nelson in June 1862 and settled at his property Woodville in the North East Valley.

Once in Dunedin, Reeves established an accountant and commissions agent in Vogel Street which later became known as Reeves & Co. His businesses included stock broking and a cordial manufacturing plant in Maclaggan Street that was later sold to Lane & Co. His son Harman Jeffares Reeves joined him in the business. Harman Reeves was prominent in his own right as chairman of the New Zealand Stock Exchange on two occasions, and was responsible for underwriting a number of early provincial government loans. He was also a long time United States consul.

Charles Reeves was a founding director of the Colonial Bank of New Zealand and National Insurance and held interests in gold mining and shipping. In 1873 he was elected to the Dunedin City Council for Leith ward, which he represented until May 1876. He was Mayor of Dunedin in 1876–1877. During the term of his mayoralty, which followed closely on the abolition of the provinces, Reeves was called on to discharge many of the duties that had previously devolved upon the Superintendent. Reeves stood in the 1878 and 1879 by-elections in the City of Dunedin electorate and came second on both occasions.

Reeves joined the Dunedin Artillery in 1863; he was captain of the North Dunedin Rifles for nine years. In 1885 he became Major in command of the first battalion of Otago Volunteers, retiring in January, 1890, as lieutenant-colonel. He was a Freemason, and a member of the Order of Oddfellows.

Reeves married Mary Charlotte Clendinnen in Melbourne and they had five children. He died in Dunedin aged 76 years, leaving four children.

He was a younger brother of New Zealand politician Richard Reeves.

== Sources ==
- Who's Who in New Zealand, 1908
- Bulls, bears, and elephants: a history of the New Zealand Stock Exchange. By David Grant
- In The Years That Are Gone, by Harman Reeves (1947), J.McIndoe NZ.
