= Rachel Armitage (social worker) =

New Zealand welfare worker and community leader

- Born: Rachelina Hepburn Stewart; 22 April 1873; Dunedin, New Zealand
- Died: 14 May 1955 (aged 82); Dunedin, New Zealand
- Education: Somerville College, Oxford
- Spouse: George Whitefield Armitage (m. 1903; died 1943)
- Children: 2
- Relatives: William Stewart Jr (brother)

Rachelina Hepburn Armitage (née Stewart; 22 April 1873 – 14 May 1955) was a New Zealand welfare worker and community leader.

== Biography ==
Armitage was born as Rachelina Hepburn Stewart in Dunedin, New Zealand on 22 April 1873. She was the daughter of Rachel Hepburn and prominent lawyer William Downie Stewart Sr. She and her siblings were raised by a nurse. She attended Otago Girls' High School from 1885 to 1892. After briefly attending a school in Switzerland, Hepburn was enrolled in Somerville College, Oxford University in 1893, where she studied modern history.

In 1896 she became the first New Zealand woman BA to complete a degree at Oxford. She remained in England, becoming part of the Women's University Settlements Scheme, an organisation aimed at improving the education and welfare of working-class women and children in London. She stayed in the United Kingdom until the death of her father in 1899.

In March 1903, she married George Whitefield Armitage, an accountant from South Otago. The couple moved to South Canterbury where they settled at Temuka and had two sons. Armitage continued her community work, founding a local branch of the New Zealand Federation of Women's Institutes. She also became a leading campaigner for the Plunket Society in rural Canterbury, an organisation which had been founded by family friend Truby King, and was Temuka branch president from 1914 to 1928, as well as being a national committee member in 1928.

After the death of George Armitage in 1943, she helped her sister Mary take care of her ailing brother, William Downie Stewart Jr, who suffered from crippling rheumatoid arthritis. Armitage died on 14 May 1955 in Dunedin.
