= George Hepburn (politician) =

New Zealand politician

George Hepburn (28 February 1803 – 9 December 1883) was a 19th-century Member of Parliament from Otago, New Zealand. Born in Scotland he emigrated to New Zealand in 1850. He first entered politics by serving on the Provincial Council of Otago from 1855 to 1865 before he was elected to the New Zealand House of Representatives as member for Roslyn in 1866.

== Early life ==
George Hepburn was born on 28 February 1803 to Janet or Jessie (née Sinclair) and William Hepburn in Leslie, Fife, Scotland. His siblings were Andrew (29 June 1801 – 17 September 1873), Catherine Suttie (28 January 1805 – 1867 and Janet Reekie (28 November 1807 – ).

After completing his schooling he became a merchant in Kirkcaldy.

In his private time he was involved in Sabbath School teaching. He was ordained an elder of the Church of Scotland and along with his minister Dr John Alexander and nearly all his congregation joined the Free Church when it was established in May 1843.

== Emigration to New Zealand ==
He, his wife and eight children emigrated to New Zealand. After travelling by ship from Leith to Gravesend, they travelled in steerage on the barque Poictiers (756 tons) under the command of Captain Thomas Shrubsole Beal. The Poictiers departed London on 7 February 1850 but then took shelter off the Isle of Wight to ride out stormy weather until they departed on 24 February and arrived at New Plymouth on 30 June 1850 after a stormy passage. The ship then proceeded to Nelson, arriving on 11 July before continuing via Wellington to Port Chalmers in Otago arriving on 6 September 1850.

Hepburn kept a detailed journal of the voyage.

== Business ==
By the time the Hepburns reached Dunedin, the settlement had already been in existence for two years but with little demand for people with his mercantile experience he bought some land at Halfway Bush and with no prior experience he and his family cleared the bush and commenced farming.

In the following year he was approached by James Macandrew who had arrived in Otago in January 1851 and was looking for assistance with running James Macandrew & Co which he and his brother-in-law William Hunter Reynolds had established in May 1851.

Accepting Macandrew's offer Hepburn took up the position of manager of James Macandrew & Co, which in time grew to own stores in Dunedin, Port Molyneux and Invercargill. The company was renamed Macandrew and Co in 1858 after Reynolds left the partnership.

In late 1855 Hepburn resigned from Macandrew and in partnership with his brother-in-law James Paterson established James Paterson & Co, who were saddlers, general merchants, and commission agents. To concentrate on his political affairs after becoming Superintendent of Otago, James Macandrew sold Macandrew and Co to James Paterson & Co in September 1859. Hepburn and Paterson operated the business successfully for several years, before selling it in 1862 upon their retirement. It subsequently merged into McLandress, Hepburn and Co, in which George's son William had an interest.

In the new colony Hepburn took a deep interest in religious matters, and was erected on 16 March 1851 as an elder of First Church for the Halfway Bush district, and was session clerk for some years. He was also one of the session of Knox Church, from its establishment until his death.

== Political career ==
New Zealand Parliament
| Years | Term | Electorate | Party |
|---|---|---|---|
| 1866–1869 | 4th | Roslyn | Independent |

Representing the Wakari District, Hepburn was a member of the Otago Provincial Council from 1855 to 1867, and for some time he served as the Chairman of Committees in the Council.

He represented the Roslyn electorate from 1866 to 1869, when he resigned on the ground of ill-health and was succeeded by Henry Driver on 12 February 1869 after a by-election.

His son-in-law William Downie Stewart Sr was also a Member of Parliament.

== Retirement and death ==
George Hepburn died at his home on 9 December 1883 at the age of 80 and is buried in the Southern Cemetery in Dunedin.

== Personal life ==
George Hepburn married Rachel Paterson (10 March 1805 – 15 August 1875) on 10 June 1833.

George and Rachel had the following children:

- William (2 May 1834 – 29 September 1887)
- James (1835 – 25 August 1875)
- Sarah (1837 – 9 July 1908)
- George (1838 – 2 November 1862)
- Alexander Duff (circa February 1840 – circa December 1840)
- David. Born 1841 (died 19 December 1870)
- Jessie Saintclair (1843 – 29 December 1923)
- Rachel (28 March 1845 – 11 November 1878); she married William Downie Stewart Sr
- Andrew (31 January 1847 – 1929)

New Zealand Parliament
| New constituency | Member of Parliament for Roslyn; 1866–1869 | Succeeded by Henry Driver |
