= Slateford, New Zealand =

Ghost town in New Zealand

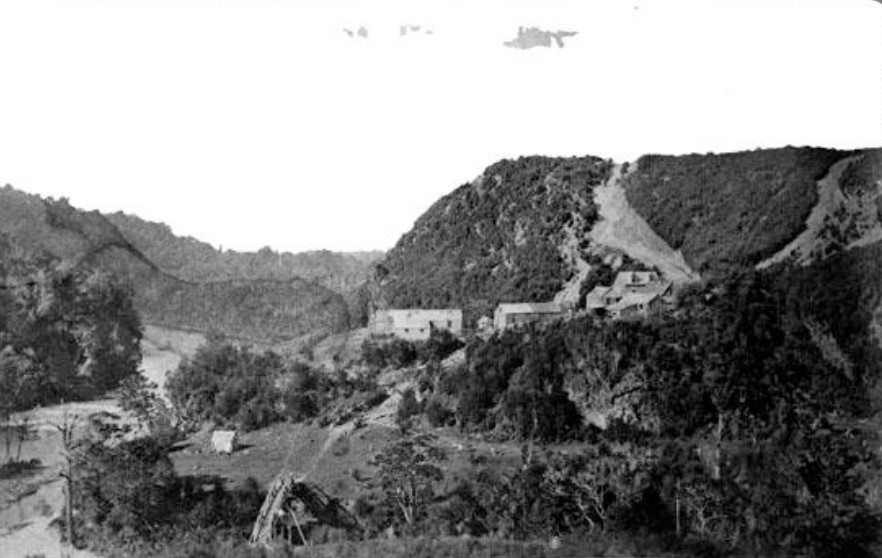
Slateford in the early 1870s. The Aorere River is on the left. The bridge in the foreground crosses the Slate River.

Slateford is a former gold mining town in Tasman District of New Zealand. It was the main settlement within the Aorere Goldfields during the rush in the 19th century. Slateford was located on the true right of the Slate River, just above its confluence with the Aorere River.

Slateford was reached from Collingwood via the Slate River Road. Most of that road does not exist any longer; parts are still legal road. From Te Anaroa Caves south, this road is today known as Devil's Boots Road, but it stops several kilometres short of Slateford. Between the southern end of Devil's Boots Road and Slateford, most is today a four-wheel drive track, with the descent from the Slate River terrace to the Slate River today a difficult walking track.

Slateford used to have a police station, pubs, and a store. Miners from the surrounding diggings would come to Slateford on Sundays to socialise. There was a horse bridge over the Slate River at Slateford that opened in April 1861, and further outlying diggings (e.g. in the Quartz Ranges) were serviced from here. Access to Slateford from Collingwood became easier in late 1871 when a dray bridge was built over Stanton Creek.

At the nomination meeting for the 1861 general election in the Collingwood electorate, James Mackay senior lamented that Slateford had been overlooked as a polling booth when he proposed Andrew Richmond as a candidate. (Note: The Colonist erroneously ascribes James Mackay junior as having proposed Andrew Richmond as a candidate. Richmond cannot have been proposed by Mackay junior, as the latter was acting as returning officer for that election. The other newspaper reporting Mackay senior as the proposer would thus have it right.) Slateford's police station was used as a polling booth in elections in the Collingwood electorate: the 1866 general election, and the 1868 by-election. John Lash closed his store and post office in April 1877, dismantled the building, and moved closer to Collingwood at what was once Washbourn's Bush. This was located between Stanton Creek and the Devil's Boots.
