= Dry River (Tasman) =

River in Tasman, New Zealand

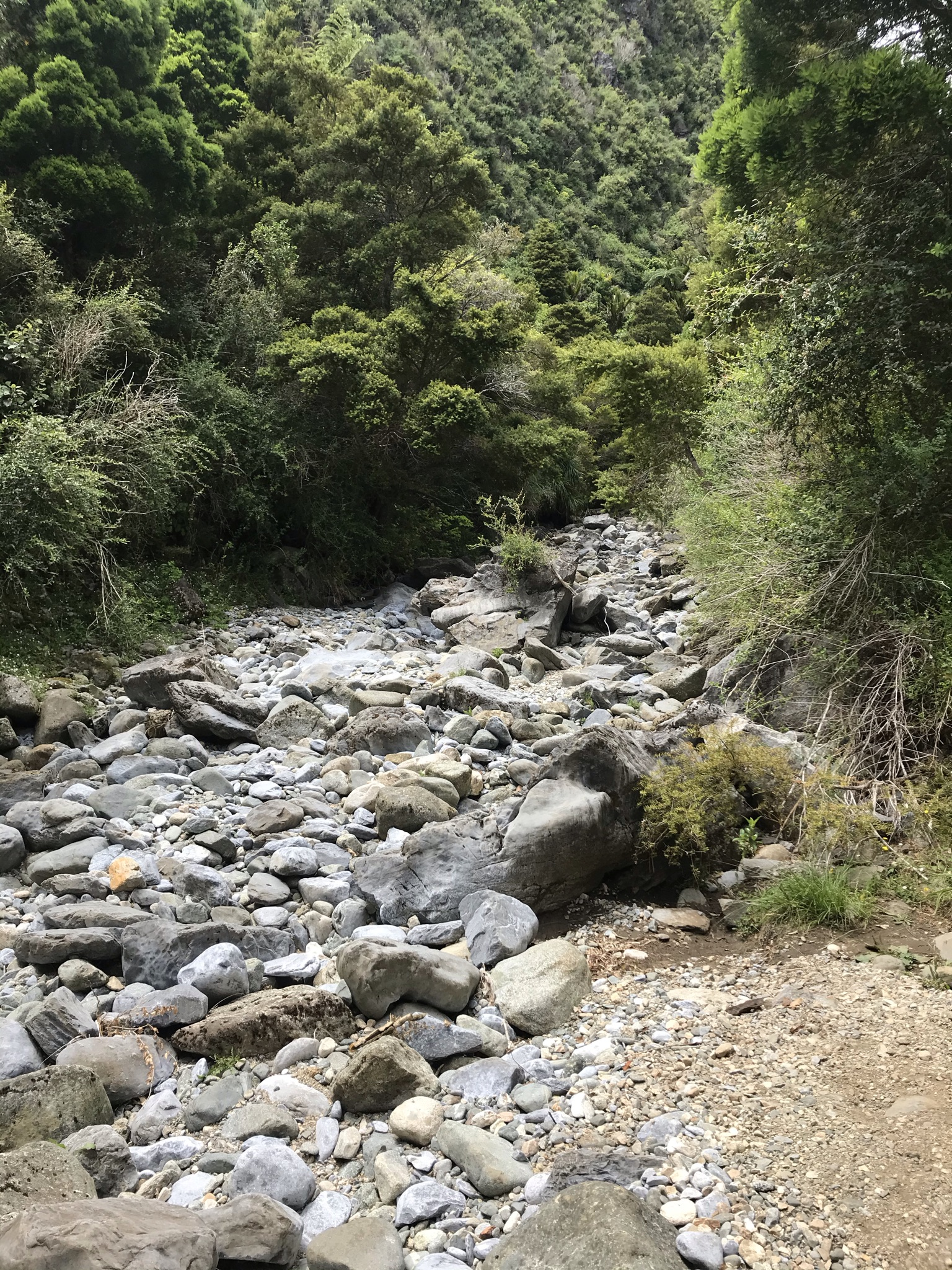
- View of the Dry River at the Rawhiti Cave Track
- Route of the Dry River

Location
- Country: New Zealand

Physical characteristics
- Source
  - location: Junction of Glenroy Stream and Peter Creek
  - coordinates: 40°52′54″S 172°52′43″E
- Mouth
  - location: Motupipi River
  - coordinates: 40°51′12″S 172°50′09″E

Basin features
- Progression: Dry River → Motupipi River → Golden Bay / Mohua → Tasman Sea
- Tributaries
  - left: Peter Creek
  - right: Glenroy Stream
- Bridges: Packard Road; Glenview Road

The Dry River is a river in Golden Bay / Mohua, New Zealand. The river drains an area to the west of the Pikikirunga Range and it flows into the Motupipi River near Tākaka. A walking track to Rawhiti Cave follows the river for some distance.

== Location and access ==
The Dry River forms at the confluence of Glenroy Stream and Peter Creek. Both tributaries originate to the west of the Pikikirunga Range. Dry River flows into the Motupipi River upstream from Abel Tasman Drive between Tākaka and Motupipi.

The Dry River is fully outside Abel Tasman National Park; only the upper reaches of Peter Creek are located with the national park. There are two public reserves administered by the Department of Conservation: Dry River Scenic Reserve to the north of the river, and Rawhiti Caves Scenic Reserve to the south of the river. As the name suggests, Rawhiti Cave is located in the southern reserve. A walking track follows Dry River, and it then climbs up to the cave. Legal access via a paper road continues upstream from the walking track along the true left of the river beyond the confluence of the tributaries.

== Bridges ==
The Dry River is crossed by two road bridges: one at Packard Road and the other at Glenview Road. When an atmospheric river hit the north of the South Island from 16 to 20 August 2022, the approach to the Glenview Road bridge was washed away by the Dry River. A nearby weather station in Hāmama recorded 1,002 mm (39.4 in) of rain during four days. The road reopened during October 2022.
