= Ann Lovell =

Homemaker, gold courier, shopkeeper {1804–1869)

Ann Lovell (née Brown; c. 1804 – 15 December 1869), her husband James and their children were the first European settlers in Golden Bay at Motupipi, east of Tākaka, New Zealand. Lovell was described in her biography as a homemaker, gold courier and shopkeeper.

== Biography ==
The entry in the Dictionary of New Zealand Biography states that she was born some time between 1803 and 1811. Her death notice from December 1869 states that she had been 65, which makes her most likely birth year 1804. Lovell married James Lovell on 3 January 1837 in Bristol. They had three children and migrated to Nelson, New Zealand, on the New Zealand Company ship the Lord Auckland in 1842. The family settled in Golden Bay at Motupipi near the 200–300 strong Māori pā at the mouth of the Motupipi River in October 1842. Because of the proximity to the pā, Lovell had close contact with local Māori and was said to have won their respect by her fearless nature. In 1843, the Lovells' fourth child, a daughter, was the first European to be born in the area. It is likely that the discovery of large quantities of coal and limestone in the area in 1841 and 1842 had drawn the Lovells to settle there. This would seem to be confirmed by the newspaper report on 8 October 1842 of a party from the Coal and Limestone Association leaving Nelson on 4 October on the 20-ton schooner Nelson Packet to settle in the area and extract coal and limestone. The names of those who went were omitted. By 1846 the Association no longer appeared to be extracting either coal or limestone from the area, this being left to the local Māori.

Her husband, James, a sawyer, together with Joseph Packard, John Perry Robinson, and C Nicoll founded the first sawmill in Golden Bay. James was involved in shipbuilding with several vessels being built at Motupipi, including the schooner Erena for the local chief, and probably the 100-ton Wellington. James was one of the founders of the Massacre Bay Coal Association. He was described as an industrious man. By 1857 he had shared workings at the Aorere gold field. In 1863 he was the owner and proprietor of the Motupipi Inn.

Lovell died at Clifton on 15 December 1869. She was aged 65.
