= 1873 Collingwood by-election =

New Zealand by-election

The 1873 Collingwood by-election was a by-election held on 9 December 1873 in the Collingwood electorate during the 5th New Zealand Parliament.

The by-election was caused by the resignation of the incumbent MP Arthur Collins on 8 October 1873.

The by-election was won by William Gibbs, who had narrowly lost the previous 1868 by-election to Collins.

Gibbs was elected unopposed.
