= 1873 Suburbs of Nelson by-election =

New Zealand by-election

The 1873 Suburbs of Nelson by-election was a by-election held on 14 May 1873 in the Suburbs of Nelson electorate in Nelson during the 5th New Zealand Parliament.

The by-election was caused by the resignation of the incumbent, Ralph Richardson. The by-election was won by Andrew Richmond. He was opposed by Charles Elliott. Fedor Kelling had withdrawn in favour of Richmond.

== Results ==
1873 Suburbs of Nelson by-election
Party	Candidate	Votes	%	±%
Independent	Andrew Richmond	146	67.59	
Independent	Charles Elliott	70	32.41	
Turnout		216		
Majority		76	35.19	
