= Andrew Richmond =

New Zealand politician (1832–1880)

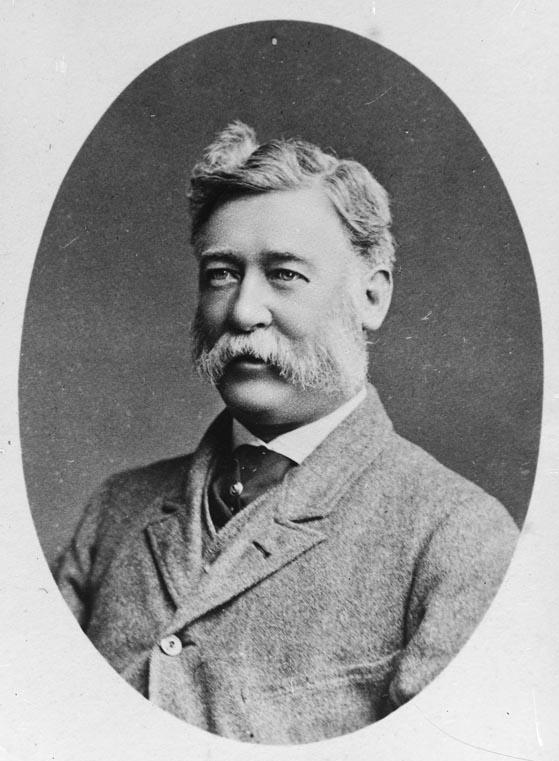
- Richmond between 1878 and 1880

Member of the New Zealand Parliament for Collingwood
- In office 4 February 1861 – 7 February 1868
- Preceded by: New constituency
- Succeeded by: Arthur Collins

Member of the New Zealand Parliament for Suburbs of Nelson
- In office 14 May 1873 – 15 November 1880
- Preceded by: Ralph Richardson
- Succeeded by: Arthur Collins

Personal details
- Born: Andrew James Richmond; 1832 Wales, United Kingdom
- Died: 15 November 1880 (aged 48) Richmond Brook, Awatere, Marlborough, New Zealand
- Spouse: Anna Richmond
- Relations: Henry Tancred (brother-in-law)
- Parent: Mathew Richmond (father)

Andrew James Richmond (1832 – 15 November 1880) was a 19th-century Member of Parliament in Golden Bay / Mohua and Nelson, New Zealand.

== Private life ==
Richmond was born in Wales in 1832. He was the son of Major Mathew Richmond. His father was administrator of the Ionian Islands in Greece from 1829 to 1838 and went to the Canadian province New Brunswick in 1839 as Deputy Judge Advocate-General. Later that year, he transferred to New South Wales. In June 1840, his father was appointed a land claims commissioner in New Zealand. Andrew Richmond received much of his schooling at Parramatta in New South Wales. In New Zealand, he first lived in Auckland before moving to Nelson.

Richmond's only sister married Henry Tancred. In 1856, he married Anna Selina (née Blundell) at St Michael's Church in Waimea West, the oldest daughter of Captain Francis Blundell. The Blundells were neighbours of the church. They were to have one son and three daughters. His son, Francis Richmond, married Mary Louisa Seymour in 1882. She was a daughter of Arthur Seymour.

== Career ==
New Zealand Parliament
Years	Term	Electorate	Party
1861–1866	3rd	Collingwood	Independent
1866–1868	4th	Collingwood	Independent
1873–1875	5th	Suburbs of Nelson	Independent
1875–1879	6th	Suburbs of Nelson	Independent
1879–1880	7th	Suburbs of Nelson	Independent

As a public servant he was the second Clerk of the Executive Council.

Richmond contested the 1861 general election in the Collingwood electorate. He beat William Travers, with the mineral surveyor William Wrey coming a distant third. At the 1866 election, Travers was nominated to stand against the incumbent but nobody seconded the nomination, and Richmond was thus declared elected unopposed.

By late 1867, it was widely known that Richmond intended to resign. In a letter to the Nelson newspaper The Colonist written on 19 December 1867, a writer using a pseudonym claimed that Richmond had resigned long ago had it not been for William Gibbs, who intended to succeed him, asking to wait with the resignation until Gibbs has had the chance to canvass the electorate. Gibbs gave a speech at Motupipi School on 28 February 1868 where he addressed the issue. Upon putting the question to him, Richmond had told Gibbs that he would delay his resignation for some months so that the miners working at the Aorere Goldfields had held their miners' licenses for more than six months, which apparently enabled them to cast a vote. Richmond's resignation happened on 7 February 1868 and it caused the 1868 Collingwood by-election. Arthur Collins defeated Gibbs by three votes.

Richmond then represented the Suburbs of Nelson electorate from 1873 to 1880, when he died.

== The Cliffs ==
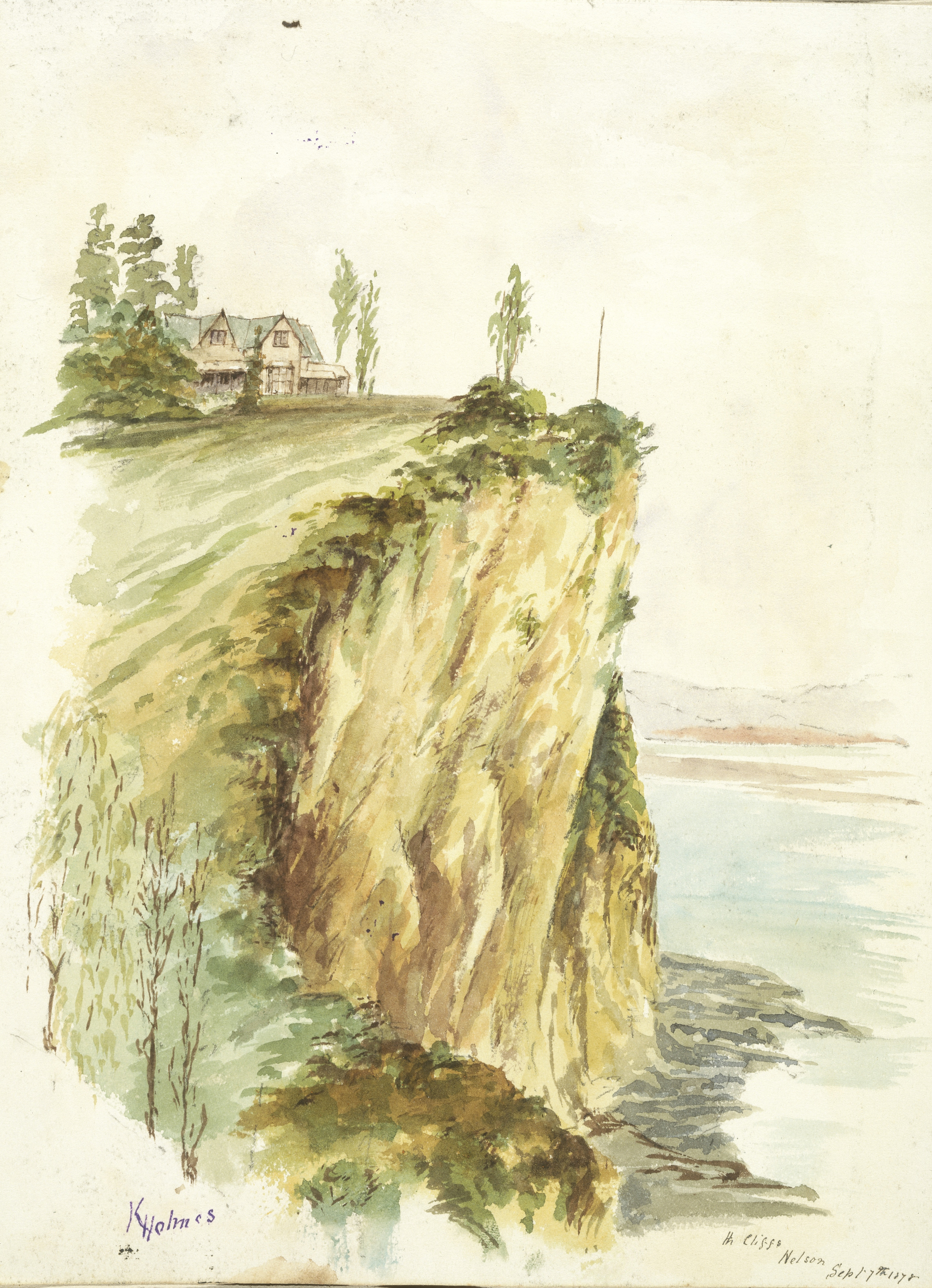
The Cliffs painted in 1878

His father had a large house built in Nelson in the early 1840s that he named The Cliffs. Located above the road formed later and still known as Rocks Road, it had a unobstructed view over Tāhunanui. Anna and Andrew Richmond lived for some time at Richmond Brook, his father's sheep run in Marlborough, but for most of the time, they lived at The Cliffs. After Anna Richmond's death in 1912, their son Francis Richmond lived there. In 1921, the house was sold to Captain Malcolm Moncrieff and his wife Pérrine Moncrieff. The Cliffs was demolished about 1970.

== Death and commemoration ==
His death on 15 November 1880 at age 48 was sudden and was attributed to heart disease. He died while at home on his farm Richmond Brook at Awatere, Marlborough. He had managed Richmond Brook for his father. Richmond was buried at Wakapuaka Cemetery. His wife died in 1912.

Richmond Brook, which flows into the Awatere River, is in the valley where the Richmonds were farming and it is named after them. Mount Richmond, commonly referred to as the Devil's Armchair and located north of the Wairau River, was named after his father. It is not certain whether the Richmond Range, which Mount Richmond is part of, was named after Mathew Richmond or Andrew Richmond.

New Zealand Parliament
New constituency	Member of Parliament for Collingwood; 1861–1868	Succeeded by Arthur Collins
Preceded by Ralph Richardson	Member of Parliament for Suburbs of Nelson; 1873–1880	Succeeded by Arthur Collins
