= 1868 Collingwood by-election =

New Zealand by-election

The 1868 Collingwood by-election was a by-election held on 18 March 1868 in the Collingwood electorate during the 4th New Zealand Parliament.

The by-election was caused by the resignation of the incumbent MP Andrew Richmond on 7 February 1868. Richmond advertised his resignation in The Nelson Examiner and New Zealand Chronicle, advising that he would be unable to attend the next session and thanking his voters for their support over the previous eight years. He intended to visit England. It had been widely known in late 1867 that Richmond intended to resign. In a letter to the Nelson newspaper The Colonist written on 19 December 1867, a writer using a pseudonym claimed that Richmond had resigned long ago had it not been for William Gibbs, who intended to succeed him, asking to wait until Gibbs has had the chance to canvass the electorate. As reported by a correspondent for the Nelson Evening Mail, Gibbs gave a speech at Motupipi School on 28 January where he apparently addressed the issue. Upon putting the question to him, Richmond had supposedly told Gibbs that he would delay his resignation for some months so that the miners working at the Aorere Goldfields had held their miners' licenses for more than six months, which enabled them to cast a vote. A correspondent to the newspaper followed up and disputed that Gibbs had ever talked about Richmond at the meeting. Rather, this had been discussed at a hotel in Tākaka on an earlier occasion where both Arthur Collins and Gibbs spoke, and it had been Collins who had made the statements about Richmond. Either way, it is unclear, though, whether miners could vote at all based on their miner's license given that the relevant legislation extending the franchise was not passed until 1862.

There were three candidates. A requisition led by Sir William Stuart Forbes was put to Collins. Jabez Gibson led the requisition put to Wastney. Alexander Bow led the requisition put to Gibbs, which was issued before Richmond had resigned. Wastney had been a member of Nelson Provincial Council since June 1867 for the Suburban North electorate. Gibbs had been a member of Nelson Provincial Council since 1855, first for the Massacre Bay electorate and since 1865 for the Collingwood electorate, reflecting a name change of the constituency. Collins was not on the provincial council; he would first be elected in November 1869.

Four polling booths were provided for this election, and they were identical to those from the 1866 general election: Collingwood Court House, the police station at Slateford at the goldfields, George Taylor's house in Tākaka, and the school house in Clifton. Dr Henry Turnell was once again the returning officer. The nomination meeting was held at the Collingwood Court House on 16 March.

The Lady Barkly sailed from Nelson to Collingwood, arriving early on election day and returning the following day so that Nelson-based electors could cast their vote.

The by-election was won by Collins, by the narrow margin of three votes.

== Results ==
1868 Collingwood by-election
Party	Candidate	Votes	%	±%
Independent	Arthur Collins	67	44.37	
Independent	William Gibbs	64	42.38	
Independent	Edmund Wastney	20	13.25	
Turnout		151		
Majority		3	1.99	
