= Suburbs of Nelson =

The Suburbs of Nelson is a former parliamentary electorate around the city of Nelson, New Zealand from 1861 to 1881.

== Population centres ==
The electorate covered the area around the Nelson urban area. The 1871 election had four polling places: the Institute in Richmond, the school house in Stoke, the Provincial Hall in Nelson and the school house in Hillside, then called Suburban North but now known as Wakapuaka (the school stood above the road at the turn off to Glenduan). In the 1873 by-election, polling places were at Waimea East, Stoke, the Provincial Hall and Wakapuaka.

== History ==
The electorate was formed for the 1861 election and existed until 1881. This period covered the 3rd to the 7th Parliament.

Fedor Kelling, who had previously represented the Waimea electorate, intended the contest the 1861 election for Suburbs of Nelson. At a meeting with electors in Stoke, it was decided that there is no real difference in political opinion between Kelling and James Wemyss, the other contender for the position. Kelling thus stepped back from the contest. Wemyss, who was away from the district for the month during the election campaign, had placed a long advertisement in The Colonist outlining his political opinion. This was published on 22 January 1861. The nomination meeting for the election was held at the school house in Stoke on Monday, 28 January 1861. Wemyss was the only candidate proposed and was thus declared elected unopposed. The meeting was poorly attended, with "few more there than his proposer and seconder".

Before the first session of the 3rd Parliament began (on 3 June 1861), Wemyss resigned as he had to leave New Zealand temporarily and was likely to miss the whole session, but he did not want to leave the electorate unrepresented. The day after Wemyss had placed his resignation by advertisement into The Colonist, William Wells announced his candidacy by advertising in the Nelson Examiner and New Zealand Chronicle. Wells had also previously represented the Waimea electorate (1855–1858). At the nomination meeting at the school house in Stoke on Thursday, 20 June 1861, Wells was the only person proposed and was thus declared elected unopposed. The nomination meeting for the 1866 election was held at the school house in Wakapuaka, Atawhai. Alfred Fell (father of Charles Fell) proposed Wells and with there being no other candidate, Wells was declared elected unopposed. Wells retired at the end of the term of the 4th Parliament in 1870.

The 1871 election was contested by Fedor Kelling and Ralph Richardson. Kelling was a supporter of Julius Vogel's public works scheme, whilst Richardson was opposed to it. At the nomination meeting, held at the Provincial Hall on 26 January 1871, the show of hands went eleven to ten in favour of Kelling. On polling day (7 February 1871), Kelling and Richardson received 89 and 130 votes, respectively. The official declaration of the poll was held on the following day, and Richardson was announced elected. Richardson resigned on 31 March 1873 "owing to urgent private affairs which require[d his] immediate departure for England".

The resignation caused the 1873 by-election. At the nomination meeting on 9 May, Charles Elliott, Andrew Richmond and Fedor Kelling were proposed. At the show of hands, they received 7, 15 and 6 votes, respectively. On 13 May, Kelling retired from the election and placed an advertisement in the Nelson Evening Mail, stating that he wanted to avoid vote splitting and urging electors to support Richmond instead, so that the Vogel Ministry can continue with their public works programme. On polling day on Wednesday, 14 May, Richmond and Elliott received 146 and 70 votes, respectively. Richmond was thus declared elected. Richmond had previously represented Collingwood (1861–1868), whilst Elliott had represented Waimea (1855–1858).

The 5th Parliament was dissolved on 6 December 1875 and a nomination meeting was held on 21 December in preparation for the next general election. William Wells nominated, and Fedor Kelling seconded the candidacy of Andrew Richmond. The other candidate put forward was William Rout, who at the time was a member of the Nelson Provincial Council (representing the Nelson electorate 1873–1876). The show of hands was 20 to 8 in favour of the incumbent. The election was held on 30 December, with Richmond and Rout receiving 125 and 98 votes, respectively. Richmond was thus declared re-elected.

The 6th Parliament was dissolved on 15 August 1879 and a nomination meeting was held on 2 September in preparation for the next general election. Andrew Richmond was nominated by William Wells and seconded by Fedor Kelling. Other candidates proposed were Hugh Henry Stafford and William Wastney. The show of hands was eleven for Richmond, eleven for Wastney, and two for Stafford. The election was held on 8 September, and Richmond gained a slight majority over Wastney. Richmond, Wastney and Stafford received 112, 101 and 53 votes, respectively. Richmond died suddenly on 15 November 1880 aged 48, and this caused a by-election early in 1881 by-election.

At the nomination meeting on 3 January, Arthur Collins and Arthur Harley were proposed, with Collins winning the show of hands by 19 to 14. Oswald Curtis proposed Collins and William Harkness (father of Joseph Harkness) seconded him. Collins had previously represented the Collingwood electorate (1868–1873) and was a conservative politician, whilst Harley had rather liberal ideas. Collins won the election on 11 January by 189 votes to 59.

== Election results ==
The electorate was represented by five members of parliament:

Key

Independent

Election	Winner
1861 election	James Wemyss
1861 by-election	William Wells
1866 election	William Wells
1871 election	Ralph Richardson
1873 by-election	Andrew Richmond
1875 election	Andrew Richmond
1879 election	Andrew Richmond
1881 by-election	Arthur Collins

=== 1881 Suburbs of Nelson by-election ===
1881 Suburbs of Nelson by-election
Party	Candidate	Votes	%	±%
Independent	Arthur Collins	189	54.31	
Independent	Arthur Harley	159	45.69	
Turnout		348		
Majority		30	8.62	

=== 1873 Suburbs of Nelson by-election ===
1873 Suburbs of Nelson by-election
Party	Candidate	Votes	%	±%
Independent	Andrew Richmond	146	67.59	
Independent	Charles Elliott	70	32.41	
Turnout		216		
Majority		76	35.19	
