= Collingwood (New Zealand electorate) =

Collingwood was a parliamentary electorate in what is now the Tasman region of the South Island of New Zealand from 1861 to 1881.

== Location ==
The Motueka and Massacre Bay electorate was one of the initial electorates of New Zealand. In the 1860 electoral redistribution, that electorate was split in half, and the Collingwood and Motueka electorates were formed. At the same time, the area north-west of Collingwood was incorporated into this electorate. Prior to 1860, the west coast of New Zealand north of Greymouth did not belong to any electorate as no European settlers lived there. The Collingwood electorate extended as far south as Karamea, where it met the extended Waimea electorate.

Based on the 1874 New Zealand census, there were on average 4,000 people represented per electorate. Collingwood was one of the most over-represented electorates, having had just 1,306 people.

The boundaries of the Collingwood electorate were next adjusted in the 1875 electoral redistribution, when the southern boundary moved north, with the Buller electorate taking over the lost area. In the 1881 electoral redistribution, the Collingwood electorate was abolished and most of the area added to the Motueka electorate.

The main settlements of the Collingwood electorate were the towns of Collingwood and Tākaka.

== History ==
The first election was held in 1861. James Mackay Jun. was the returning officer. The nomination meeting was held at the Court House in Collingwood on 31 January 1861. Three candidates were proposed: William Travers (nominated by William Gibbs and seconded by W. Schafer), the mineral surveyor William Wrey (nominated by Dr A. Mathews and seconded by Jacob William Miles), and Andrew Richmond (nominated by James Mackay Sen. and seconded by William Lightband). Travers and Wrey were both absent, and Richmond spent much of his nomination speech discrediting Travers. There were three polling booths throughout the electorate: the Collingwood Court House, the school house in Motupipi, and George Taylor's house in Tākaka. Richmond won the election held on 4 February 1861.

For the 1866 election, the nomination was held at the Collingwood Court House on 9 March, with Dr Henry Turnell as returning officer. Richmond was proposed by Gibbs and seconded by John Edmund Price. Travers was nominated by James McKenzie and although the returning officer waited for a long time, nobody seconded Travers' nomination. Richmond was thus declared elected unopposed. Four polling booths had been arranged for this election: Collingwood Court House, the police station at Slateford (then an active goldfield), George Taylor's house in Tākaka, and the school house in Clifton.

Arthur Shuckburgh Collins won the 18 March 1868 by-election, was confirmed at the 1871 general election, and resigned on 8 October 1873.

== Members ==
The electorate was represented by three Members of Parliament:

Key

Independent

Election	Winner
1861 election	Andrew Richmond
1866 election	Andrew Richmond
1868 by-election	Arthur Collins
1871 election	Arthur Collins
1873 by-election	William Gibbs
1875 election	William Gibbs
1879 election	William Gibbs

== Election results ==
=== 1861 election ===
1861 general election: Collingwood
Party	Candidate	Votes	%	±%
Independent	Andrew Richmond	106	63.10	
Independent	William Travers	52	30.95	
Independent	William Wrey	10	5.95	
Majority		54	32.14	
Turnout		168		
Registered electors				

=== 1868 by-election ===
1868 Collingwood by-election
Party	Candidate	Votes	%	±%
Independent	Arthur Collins	67	44.37	
Independent	William Gibbs	64	42.38	
Independent	Edmund Wastney	20	13.25	
Turnout		151		
Majority		3	1.99	
