= 1861 Suburbs of Nelson by-election =

New Zealand by-election

The 1861 Suburbs of Nelson by-election was a by-election held on 20 June 1861 in the Suburbs of Nelson electorate during the 3rd New Zealand Parliament.

The by-election was caused by the resignation of the incumbent, James Wemyss, who was travelling overseas and did not want the electorate unrepresented

He was replaced by William Wells.

Wells was the only nomination, so was declared elected unopposed.
