= Arthur Harley =

Arthur Harley may refer to:

- Arthur Harley (gymnast) (fl. 1900s), British gymnast
- Arthur Harley (politician) (fl. 1880s), New Zealand political candidate
