= William Wells (New Zealand politician) =

New Zealand politician

William Wells (1810 – 21 January 1893) was a New Zealand politician.

== Early life ==
Wells came to Nelson in the early 1840s and purchased land in Wakapuaka, north of Nelson, from the New Zealand Company, which he kept all his life. He farmed a property there. He returned to live in England for some time. He was a part owner of the Dun Mountain Railway.

== Politics ==
New Zealand Parliament
Years	Term	Electorate	Party
1855–1858	2nd	Wairau	Independent
1861–1866	3rd	Suburbs of Nelson	Independent
1866–1870	4th	Suburbs of Nelson	Independent

Wells was a member of the Nelson Provincial Council. From August 1855 to August 1857, he represented the Suburban District. From October 1857 until November 1861, he represented the Suburban North electorate.

The nomination for the 1855 election in the Wairau electorate was set for 19 November, and this is the date recorded in the standard reference book, the New Zealand Parliamentary Record, 1840–1984, for the election of Wells, but that election did not happen. The mail did not reach the Wairau Valley in time, and the electors did not know about the election. The new date for the nomination meeting was set as 6 December. Wells was one of many members of the House of Representatives who resigned in early 1858; he placed a public notice to that effect in the 20 March edition of The Nelson Examiner. At the opening of the second session of the 2nd Parliament on 10 April 1858, the speaker read out 14 resignations, including that of Wells. The resulting by-election was won by Wells' predecessor, Frederick Weld. Wells later represented the Suburbs of Nelson in the 3rd Parliament and the 4th Parliament, from 1861 to 1870, when he retired.

== Death ==
He died on 21 January 1893, aged 82 years, at his property Marybank in Wakapuaka and was buried two days later at Wakapuaka Cemetery.

New Zealand Parliament
Preceded by Frederick Weld	Member of Parliament for Wairau; 1855–1858	Succeeded by Frederick Weld
Preceded by James Wemyss	Member of Parliament for Suburbs of Nelson; 1861–1870	Succeeded by Ralph Richardson
