= James Wemyss (New Zealand politician) =

New Zealand politician

Member of the New Zealand Parliament for Suburbs of Nelson
- In office 28 January 1861 – 21 May 1861
- Preceded by: New constituency
- Succeeded by: William Wells

Personal details
- Born: James Balfour Wemyss; 28 October 1828 Wemyss Hall, Cupar, Fife, Scotland
- Died: 13 July 1909 (aged 80) West Sussex, England

James Balfour Wemyss (28 October 1828 – 13 July 1909) was a 19th-century member of Parliament for Nelson, New Zealand.

== Early life ==
Wemyss was born on 28 October 1828 at Wemyss Hall near Cupar in Fife, Scotland. He was the eldest son of Major James Balfour Wemyss (1799–1871) and Susan (née Gillespie). He attended Edinburgh Academy and matriculated in 1847. He was admitted to St John's College, Cambridge on 17 April 1847 and migrated to Jesus College on 16 October 1847. He graduated with a Bachelor of Arts in 1851.

== Life in New Zealand ==
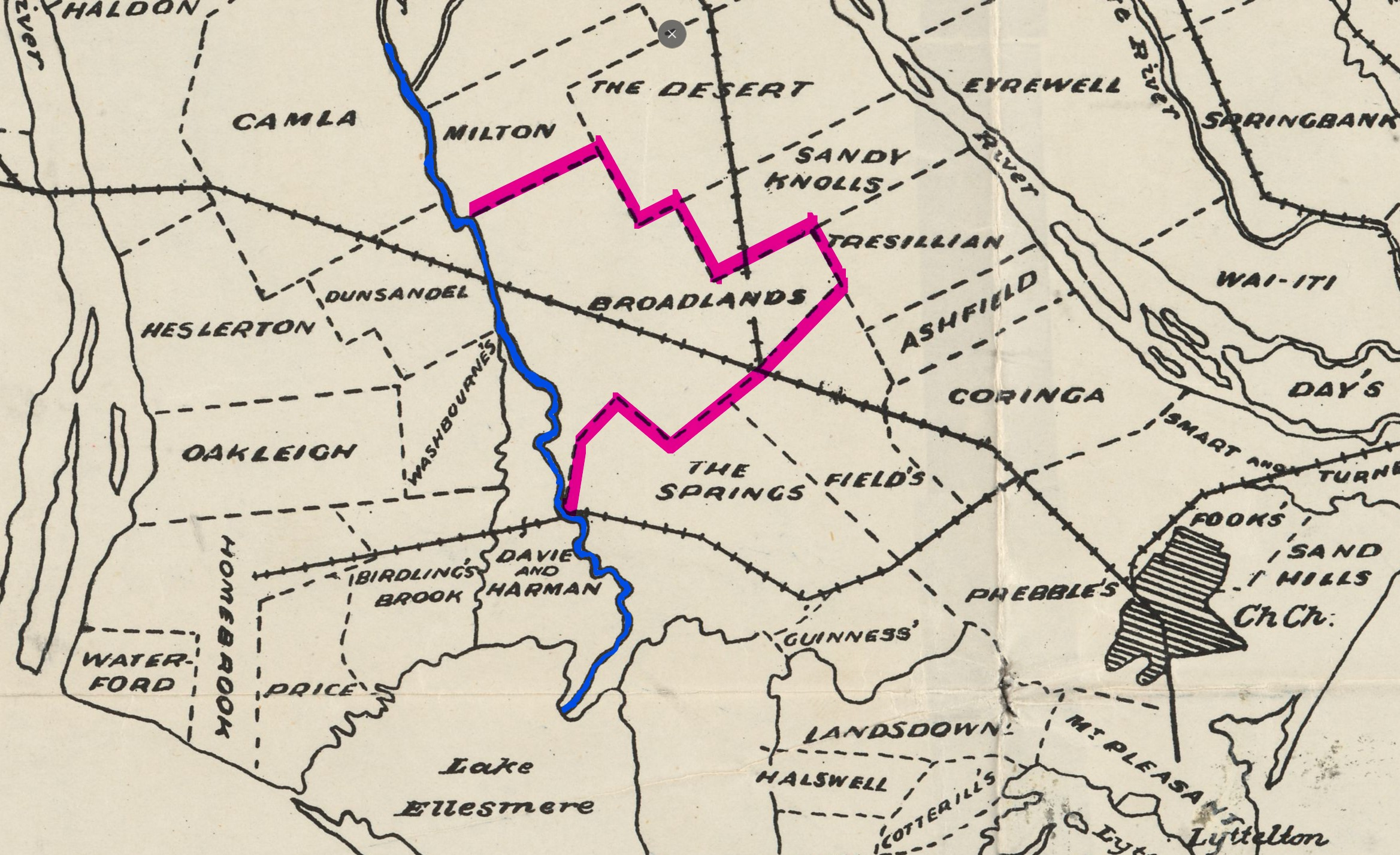
Broadlands Station and the Selwyn River

Wemyss came to New Zealand in 1852 on the Agra and took up large sheep runs. Broadlands Station was a sheep station in Canterbury, located north of the Selwyn River / Waikirikiri. It was made up of four individual runs: 40, 74, 85, and 95. After his arrival, Wemyss bought run 40, the western part Broadlands, from John Studholme. On 5 November 1853, Wemyss bought run 95 from Studholme. Wemyss sold those two runs to John Cracroft Wilson on 8 August 1854.

=== Political career ===
New Zealand Parliament
Years	Term	Electorate	Party
1861	3rd	Suburbs of Nelson	Independent

Wemyss represented the Wairau electorate in the Nelson Provincial Council from 9 October 1857 to 18 October 1859. He was appointed to the Nelson Executive Council on 11 April 1859 and remained on the executive until 6 May 1862. He then represented the Wairau Valley electorate on the Marlborough Provincial Council from 5 September 1865 to 22 September 1869. He was a member of three executive councils of Marlborough Province: from 24 October 1865 (no end date given), from 29 May 1867 to October 1867, and from 6 July 1870 to 11 December 1871.

Fedor Kelling, who had previously represented the Waimea electorate, intended to contest the 1861 election for the Suburbs of Nelson electorate. At a meeting with electors in Stoke, it was decided that there is no real difference in political opinion between Kelling and Wemyss, the other contender for the position. Kelling thus stepped back from the contest. Wemyss, who was away from the district for the month during the election campaign, had placed a long advertisement in The Colonist outlining his political opinion. This was published on 22 January 1861. The nomination meeting for the election was held at the school house in Stoke on Monday, 28 January 1861. Wemyss was the only candidate proposed and was thus declared elected unopposed. The meeting was poorly attended, with "few more there than his proposer and seconder".

Before the first session of the 3rd Parliament began (on 3 June 1861), Wemyss resigned on 21 May 1861 as he had to leave New Zealand temporarily and was likely to miss the whole session, but he did not want to leave the electorate unrepresented.

== Later New Zealand career ==
After Wemyss returned, he was Provincial Secretary and Commissioner of Crown Lands for Marlborough. His father died in September 1871 (Note: Lindsay Buick, in his book Old Marlborough: or, The Story of a Province, incorrectly states that Wemyss inherited Wemyss Hall from his uncle.) and Wemyss was instructed to return to Scotland and take over Wemyss Hall and the associated estate. Wemyss' resignation from his roles triggered a number of changes. William Henry Eyes resigned from Parliament after he had persuaded William Gisborne to give him the Marlborough Commissioner of Crown Lands role. The resulting by-election was contested by Arthur Seymour and Joseph Ward, with Seymour the winner.

== Family and death ==
Wemyss married Mary Ashton Smith on 23 March 1857 in Nelson. She died in May 1878 in Mortlake, England. In 1892, he married Mary Ann (Annie) Biddulph (née Barnikel), the eldest daughter of William Hugh Barnikel and the widow of William Wallich Biddulph. Wemyss died on 13 July 1909 in West Sussex, England.

== Notes ==
New Zealand Parliament
New constituency	Member of Parliament for Suburbs of Nelson; 1861	Succeeded by William Wells
