= Arahura Deed =

Land sale and agreement signed in New Zealand

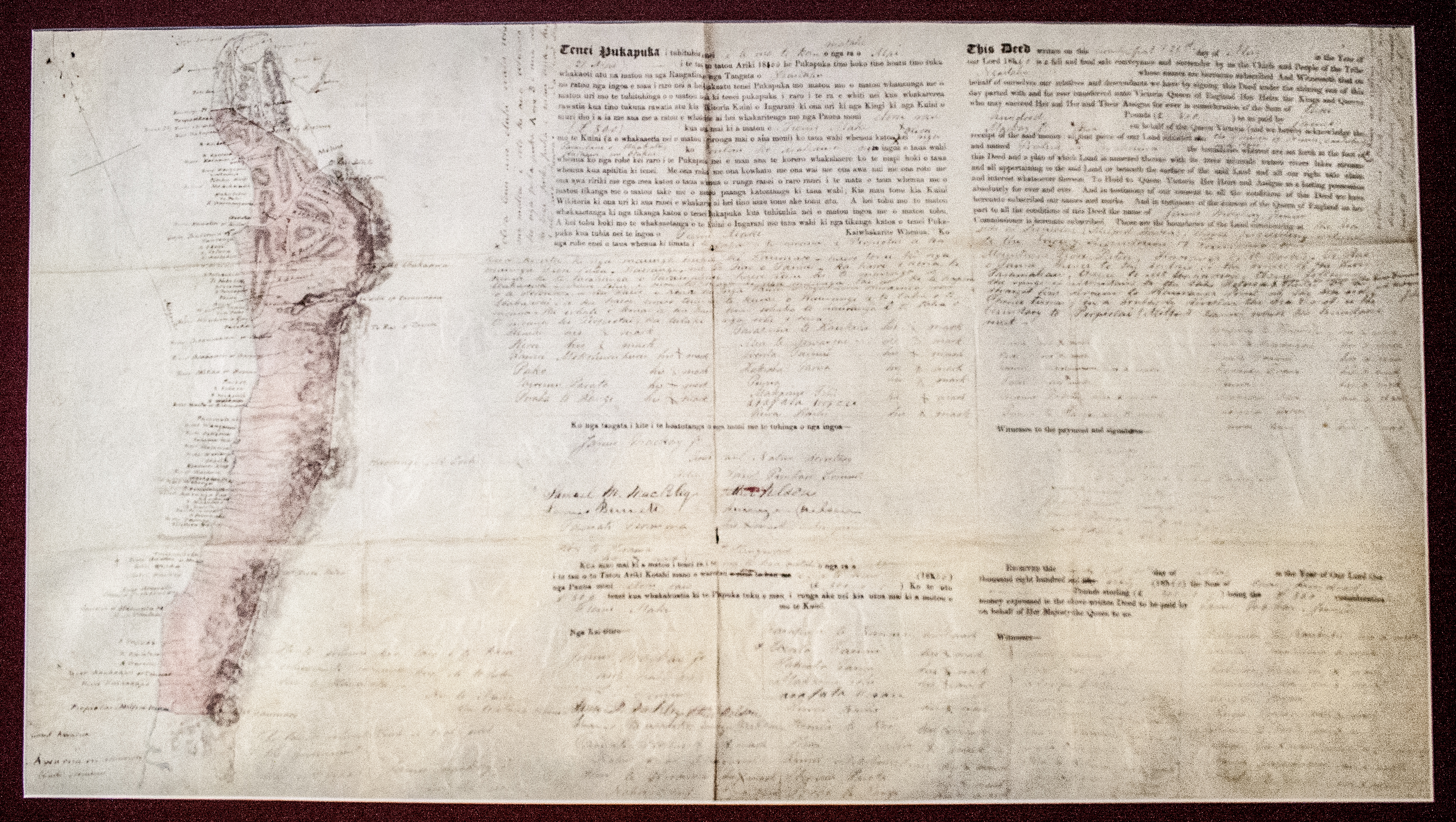
Scanned copy of the Arahura Deed in Hokitika Museum 2016-02-03

The Arahura Deed was a land sale and agreement between Kāi Tahu iwi and James Mackay on behalf of the New Zealand settler government, signed on 21 May 1860 by Poutini chiefs at Māwhera (modern-day Greymouth).

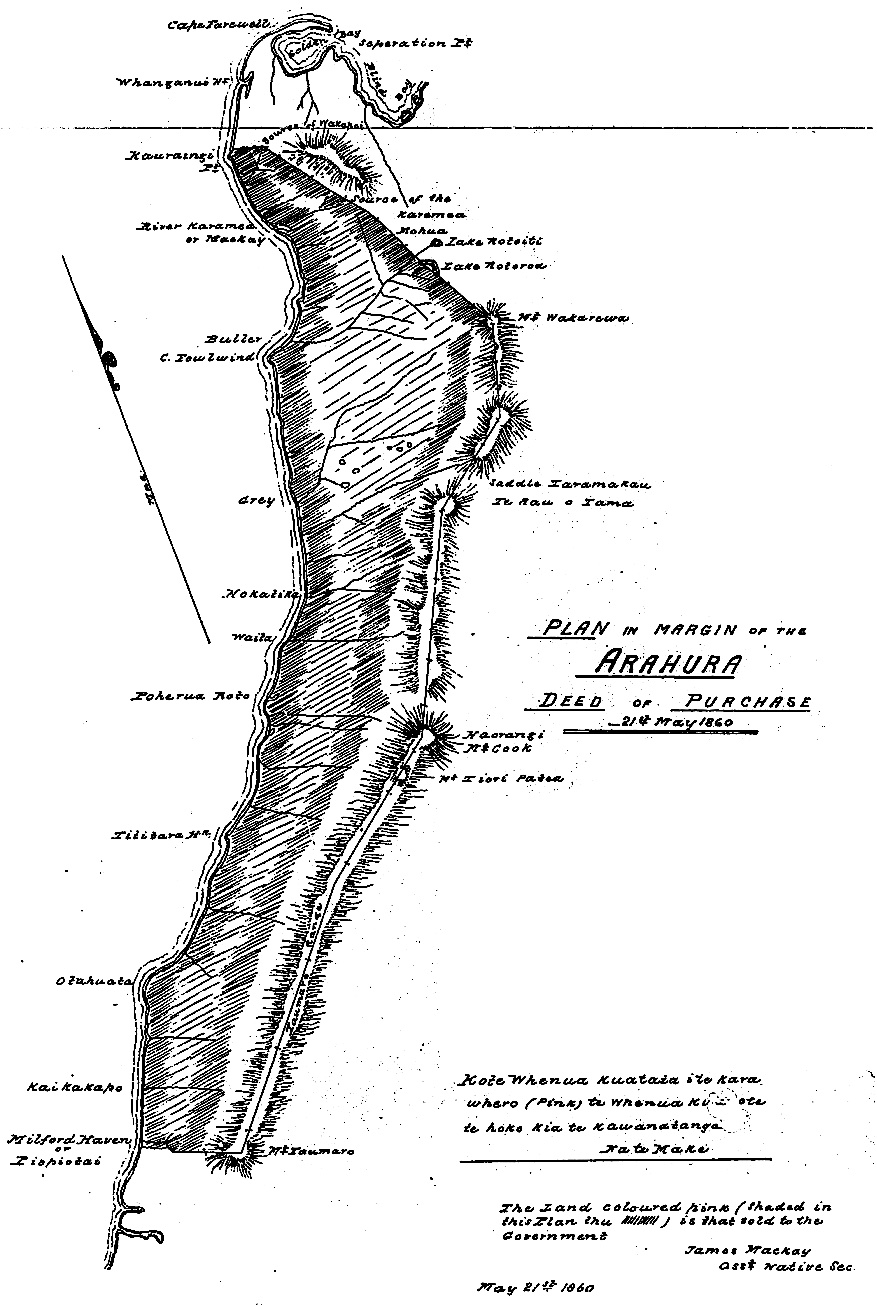
Detail of the map, which includes nearly all of the West Coast north of Milford Sound (Piopiotahi)

The signed document provided for the chiefs to give up their people's customary title on 7,000,000 acres (2,800,000 ha) of whenua (land) in return for £300 (about 1d per 100 acres) with 6,724 acres reserved for the people of the iwi, another 3,500 for "religious, social and moral purposes", 2,000 acres for later sale to cover surveying costs and 472 acres allocated to Ngāti Apa. It also allowed Kāi Tahu to buy back land between the river and Tūhua mountain at 10s. per acre (12,000 times as expensive as the acres sold to the government). In 1991 the Waitangi Tribunal found that, "In offering to pay no more than a nominal price for land which had the potential for a very early substantial rise in value, the tribunal concluded that the Crown failed to act with the degree of good faith required of one Treaty partner to the other."
