= 1881 Suburbs of Nelson by-election =

New Zealand by-election

The 1881 Suburbs of Nelson by-election was a by-election held on 11 January 1881 in the Suburbs of Nelson electorate in Nelson during the 7th New Zealand Parliament.

The by-election was caused by the death of the incumbent Andrew Richmond, on 15 November 1880. The by-election was won by Arthur Collins. Collins was opposed by Arthur Harley, described as a young man with radical ideas like abolishing the governor and the legislative council and issuing a paper currency. Harley was said to be all for "smashing and wasting" and to out-Greys Grey in his Greyism! So it was a fight between "Communism and Constitutionalism".

== Results ==
1881 Suburbs of Nelson by-election
Party	Candidate	Votes	%	±%
Independent	Arthur Collins	189	54.31	
Independent	Arthur Harley	159	45.69	
Turnout		348		
Majority		30	8.62	
