= Alexander Mackay (magistrate) =

New Zealand farmer, explorer, linguist, magistrate and land court judge

Alexander Mackay (11 May 1833 – 18 November 1909) was a New Zealand farmer, explorer, linguist, magistrate and land court judge. He was born in Edinburgh, Midlothian, Scotland on 11 May 1833. James Mackay Sr was his uncle and James Mackay Jr was his cousin. He married Hannah Sarah Gibbs at Collingwood, a daughter of William Gibbs.

Mackay died at Feilding on 18 November 1909, and was buried at Feilding Cemetery.
