= Ralph Richardson (politician born 1848) =

New Zealand politician (1848–1895)

Ralph Richardson (1848–1895) was a 19th-century Member of Parliament in Nelson, New Zealand.

== Biography ==
New Zealand Parliament
Years	Term	Electorate	Party
1871–1873	5th	Suburbs of Nelson	Independent

Richardson was born in Capenhurst, Cheshire, England. He came to New Zealand on the Maori in 1851. He was the son of Dr Ralph Richardson and Marie Louise Richardson. His father was a Member of the Legislative Council from 1853 to 1856.

He represented the Suburbs of Nelson electorate from 1871. He resigned on 31 March 1873 "owing to urgent private affairs which require[d his] immediate departure for England".

Richardson lived in London for the later part of his life.

New Zealand Parliament
Preceded by William Wells	Member of Parliament for Suburbs of Nelson; 1871–1873	Succeeded by Andrew Richmond
