= Motupipi River =

River in Tasman District, New Zealand

Coordinates: 40°50′S 172°50′E

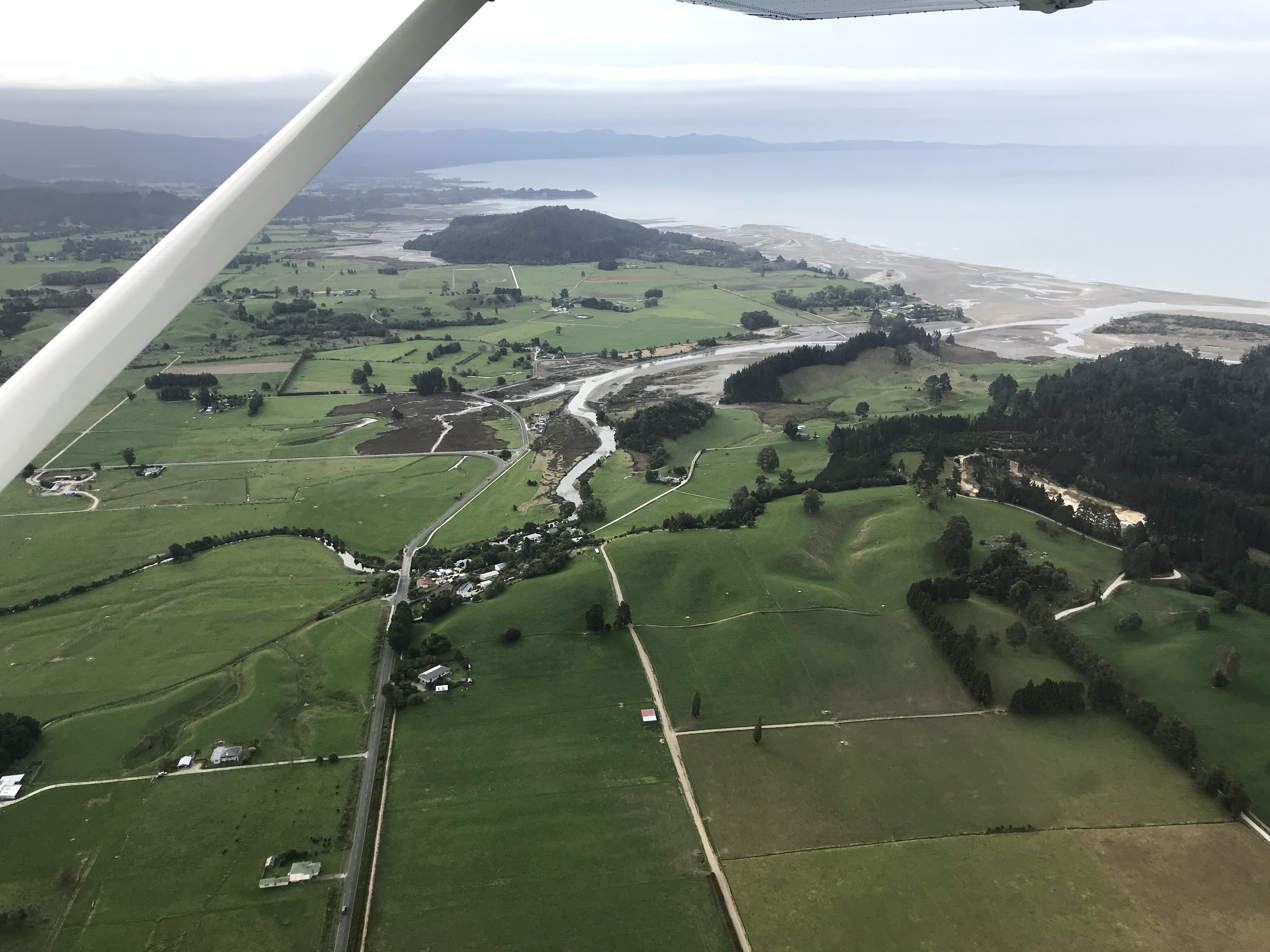
- lower reaches and estuary of the Motupipi River

Location
- Country: New Zealand

Physical characteristics
- Mouth
  - location: Golden Bay

The Motupipi River is a short river of the Tasman Region of the South Island of New Zealand. Located in the Tākaka valley in Golden Bay, it used to be the most polluted river in the Tasman Region. Significant stream regeneration work has been underway since the early 2000s.

== Etymology ==
The New Zealand Ministry for Culture and Heritage gives a translation of "pipi island" for Motupipi.

== Location ==
Motupipi River has its source adjacent to State Highway 60 just south of the Tākaka urban area. It flows northwest to reach Golden Bay to the north of Motupipi. Powell Creek flows into the river from its true right near Scott Road in Tākaka. Slightly downstream from there, the Dry River also joins from the true right.

The Motupipi River has a catchment of circa 2855 hectares within the Tākaka valley. This is made up of circa 1040 ha of flat or gently rolling country, circa 1200 ha of steep hill country (drained by Dry Creek), 460 ha of rolling hills, and 40 ha of estuary. Anti-clockwise from the sea, the catchment is bounded by the hamlet Rototai, Tākaka township, State Highway 60, the shallow ridge north-east of Rāmeka Creek, the Pikikirunga Range up to the Dry Creek catchment, and returning to the sea via Motupipi.

=== Bridges ===
The Motupipi River is crossed by one public road – Abel Tasman Drive. In January 2020, a pathway from Pōhara to Tākaka opened but at Motupipi River, users had to use the narrow road bridge that has no road shoulder. In November 2021, Tasman District Council agreed to fund a separate bridge for walking and cycling just downstream from the road bridge. After Christine Pullar, the chairperson of the Golden Bay Cycle and Walkways Society who was the main instigator of the new bridge, died in April 2022, the Golden Bay Community Board agreed that the new bridge is going to bear Pullar's name.

== Environmental status ==
After concerns were raised about pollution, more detailed monitoring was started by Tasman District in 2005. In 2007, the investigation showed that the Motupipi River was most polluted river in Tasman District. The report author, a Tasman District Council staff member, suggested that the river be restored. An early action by farmers was to build stock bridges so that cows don't have to cross through the waterway.

There are three dairy farms in the catchment, with the Reilly farm held by that family since 1853. The river and contributing creeks have since been fenced. Crack willow (Salix × fragilis) was poisoned and removed, and native vegetation planted in its place. The planting is carried out by the land owners and volunteers from Streamcare, a branch of Forest & Bird. By 2014, the Reilly family had planted more than 2000 plants. In the past, the Catchment Board had encouraged that streams and rivers be straightened to maximise land use, but as part of the restoration, a more natural meandering path was recreated.

== See also ==
- List of rivers of New Zealand
