= Rawhiti Cave =

Cave in New Zealand

Coordinates: 40.8853°S 172.86649°E

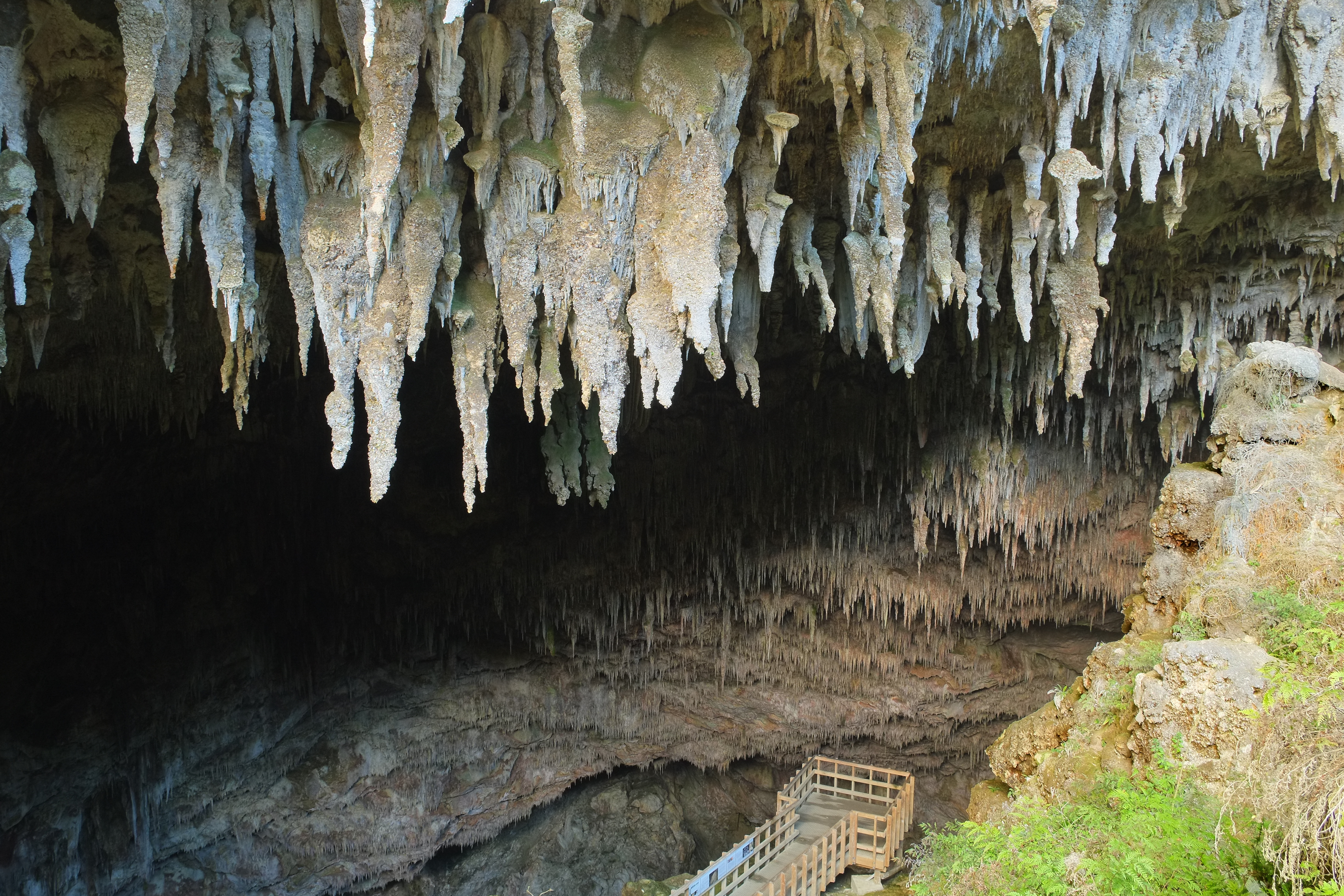
View into Rawhiti Cave towards viewing platform

Rawhiti Cave, also known as Manson Cave, is a single large limestone cave in the hillside of the Dry Creek Valley 7 kilometres (4.3 mi) southeast of Tākaka on the South Island of New Zealand. It is referred to as Manson Cave in the NZ Topo Map, after owners in the early 20th century, however the cave is known as Rawhiti Cave locally, and on DoC information panels and in brochures.

The cave's entrance is one of the largest cave entrances in New Zealand with an opening of about 40 metres (130 ft) wide and up to 20 metres (66 ft) tall. The ceiling is densely covered in stalactites which become increasingly finer deeper down into the cave. A short walking track leads halfway down into the cavernous opening to a viewing platform.

== Flora ==
The diverse twilight-zone flora near the entrance of Rawhiti Cave makes this cave nationally significant. Over long periods of time, plant growth on the cave formations causes them to grow towards the sunlight as more calcium carbonate is deposited regularly on top of the plant growth. This phenomenon, called phytokarst, is most evident on the larger stalactites near the cave entrance, which are strongly curved outwards due to the heavy moss and fern growth on their sunlit sides.

Apart from the short walking track to the viewing platform, the cave is undeveloped and in its natural state. Delicate ferns and mosses grow on the cave's sloping floor, and phytokarst stalagmites also grow towards the light, similarly following the growth pattern of the plant life that helps form and shape them.

During winter months, sunlight reaches the back wall of the cavern, creating viable conditions for some species of algae to survive at the lower limit of light availability for photosynthesis. These algae cover the rear walls in a range of red hues.

== History and tourism ==
Rawhiti Cave was originally formed some one million years ago, before Dry River cut the valley deeper to its present position. The original cave roof collapsed long ago, forming a massive self-supporting dome leading down to a steep-sided pit formed of loose debris.

In the early 1900s, Darcy Manson, son of the landowner, cut a track to the cave and took people there on tours until the late 1920s. He named the cave Rawhiti, Māori for "sunrise", due to the winter sun shining right to the back of the cave. From 1955 to 2000, the cave was owned by the Baird family, who provided daily tours on demand. In 2000, the cave's ownership changed to Heritage New Zealand, and the Baird Reserve area is now managed by the Department of Conservation NZ, its 150 hectares (370 acres) split into the adjacent Dry River Scenic Reserve and Rawhiti Caves Scenic Reserve.

The track to Rawhiti Cave starts at an informal car park on private farm land and leads into the Dry River valley for 30 minutes, followed by a 30-minute uphill zigzag track to the cave entrance. The viewing platform inside the cave entrance includes information panels and is still well enough lit that no torches are needed. This is one of very few such caves that is open free of charge to the general public, hence visitors are urged to stick to the path to avoid damaging the fragile environment inside the cave.

== See also ==
- List of caves in New Zealand
