= William Gibbs (New Zealand politician) =

New Zealand politician (c. 1920 – 1896)

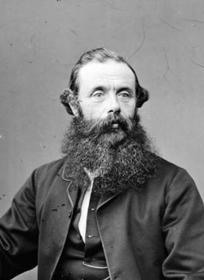
Gibbs (prior to 1876)

New Zealand Parliament
Years	Term	Electorate	Party
1873–1875	5th	Collingwood	Independent
1875–1879	6th	Collingwood	Independent
1879–1881	7th	Collingwood	Independent

William Gibbs (1819 or 1820 – 7 November 1896) was a 19th-century Member of Parliament from the Nelson Region of New Zealand.

Gibbs migrated to New Zealand in 1851. In 1854, he purchased 40 acres (16 ha) of land adjacent to Aorere pā from the Māori living there. His intention was to farm there, but the land proved to be unsuitable for farming. Having paid £40 for the land, he tried to recover his costs by selling the land for the same price in 1856, but he could not find anyone interested in it. After the Aorere gold rush started in early 1857, Gibbs instead subdivided the land; it had become worth £25,000. That part of the town of Collingwood that was originally owned by Gibbs became known as Gibbstown.

In about 1856, Gibbs purchased a large block of land at Tōtaranui. Much of this land is now incorporated into the Abel Tasman National Park. He completed a large homestead there for his wife and eight children, where they lived until moving to Nelson in 1892 when Gibbs retired.

His daughter Hannah Sarah Gibbs married Alexander Mackay at Collingwood in 1863.

He narrowly lost (by three votes) the 1868 by-election for Collingwood.

He represented the Collingwood electorate from 1873 to 1881, when he was defeated for Motueka. His son W. B. Gibbs stood in the Nelson electorate in the 1887 election, but came third against Henry Levestam and Jesse Piper.

Gibbs died aged 76 at his home in Nelson on 7 November 1896, and was buried at Wakapuaka Cemetery. In his later years, he was the pre-eminent person in Golden Bay.

New Zealand Parliament
Preceded by Arthur Collins	Member of Parliament for Collingwood; 1873–1881	Constituency abolished
