= Hill of Tarvit =

Mansion house and gardens in Fife, Scotland

Coordinates: 56.294982°N 3.005504°W

Designations

Inventory of Gardens and Designed Landscapes in Scotland
- Official name: Hill of Tarvit (Wemyss Hall)
- Designated: 1 July 1987
- Reference no.: GDL00211

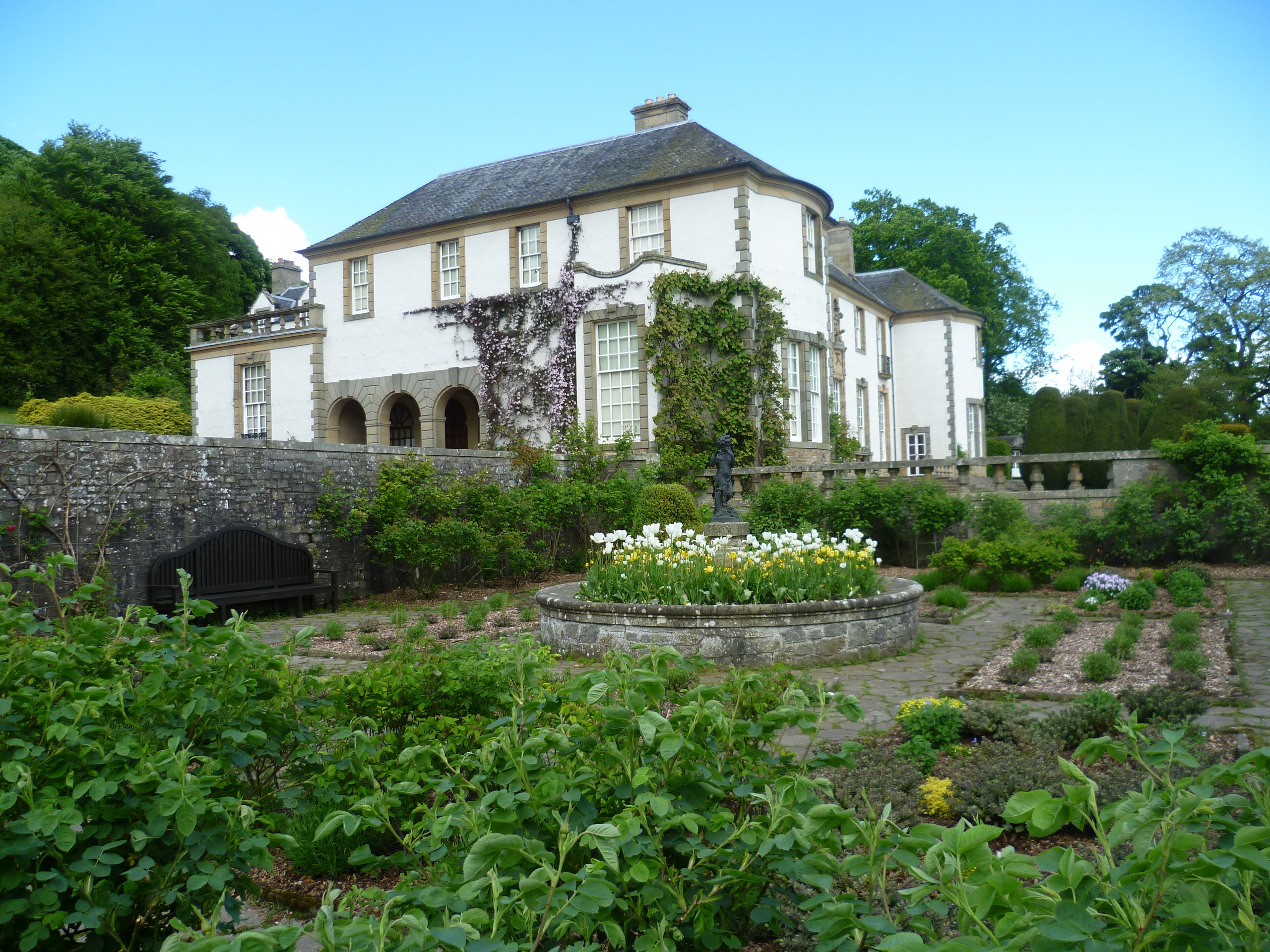
Hill of Tarvit

The Hill of Tarvit is a 20th-century mansion house and gardens in Fife, Scotland. They were designed by Sir Robert Lorimer and are today owned by the National Trust for Scotland.

== Description ==
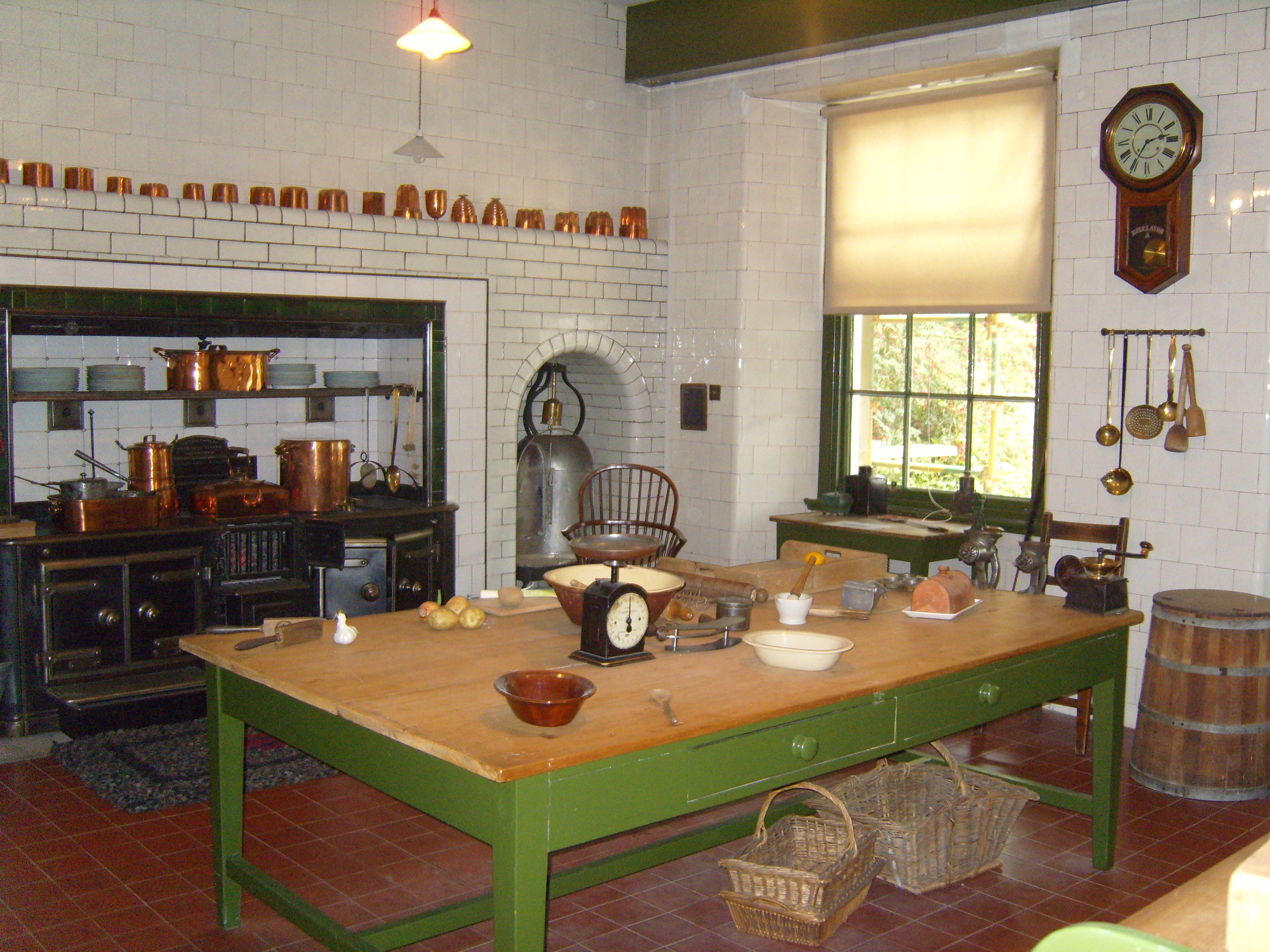
"below stairs" – the kitchen

The house is situated on a hillside a mile and a half south of Cupar, Fife. It is set in 40 acres (160,000 m^{2}) of garden and 279 acres (1.13 km^{2}) of open estate. This includes woodland, parkland, farmland and open heath, with extensive views.

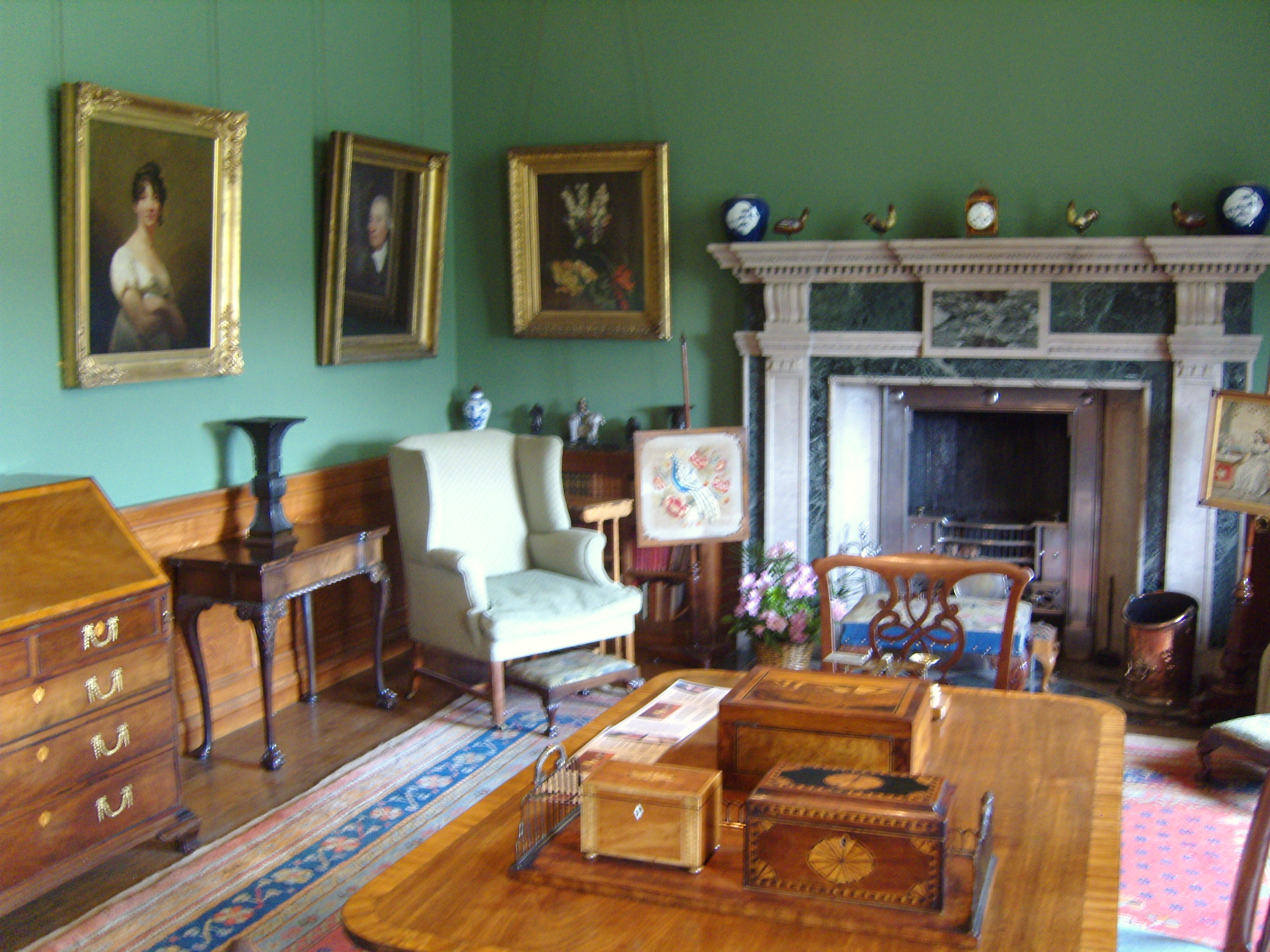
The library

Between 1905 and 1906, the house and gardens were remodelled, for the Sharp family, by the renowned Scottish architect Sir Robert Lorimer incorporating French and Chippendale-style furniture, porcelain and paintings collected by F B Sharp.

The house today and wider estates are owned and operated by the National Trust for Scotland. They display Lorimer's original design and furnishings, and they are open to the public. Visitors are able to see both the Sharp family's state of the art accommodation, as well as glimpse life "below-stairs" for the servants. The 9-hole golf course has also been restored and players can compete in Edwardian style with original hickory clubs and softer rubber-wound balls.

== History ==
The site dates back to at least the Iron Age. The remains of a homestead were excavated in 1946–1947 at the top of Tarvit Hill. During the excavation, an elaborate circular wooden house of about 17 m in diameter was found, it was within an oval bank which enclosed an area of 33x27m. The house is thought to have been occupied between 200 BC and AD 200, and rebuilt at least twice in that period.

=== Scotstarvit tower ===
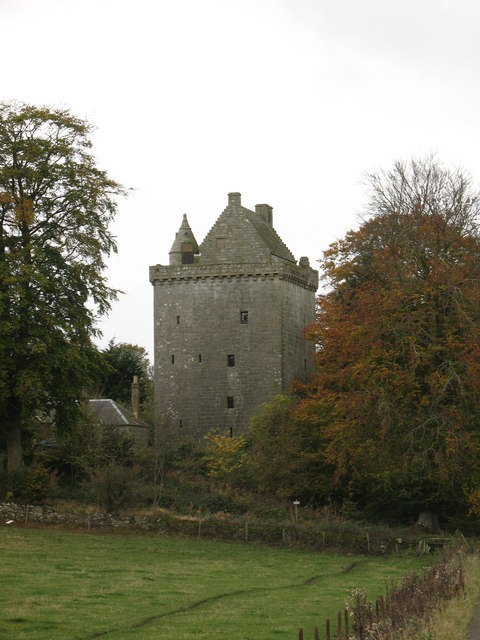
Scotstarvit tower

In 1500, Scotstarvit Tower was built a mile southwest from Hill of Tarvit. This was constructed by the Inglis family of Tarvit as the centre of their estate. The tower was then sold in 1611 to Sir John Scott of Scotstarvit. Sir John rebuilt much of the tower in the 1620s – seen by the date 1627 on a piece of the Tower's chimneypiece that now forms part of the fireplace in the Hill of Tarvit's smoking room.

=== Wemyss Hall ===
The estate, then known as Unthank was remodelled by John Wemyss of Unthank after 1696. Wemyss neglected the defensive tower as redundant and built a new mansion house on the site of the current Hill of Tarvit house, naming it "Wemyss House". The architect used here was possibly Sir William Bruce. This house was expanded in the following centuries, with a service wings added to the rear or north side, one during the 1840s. It was extensively rebuilt in 1907 by Robert Lorimer.

=== Hill of Tarvit ===
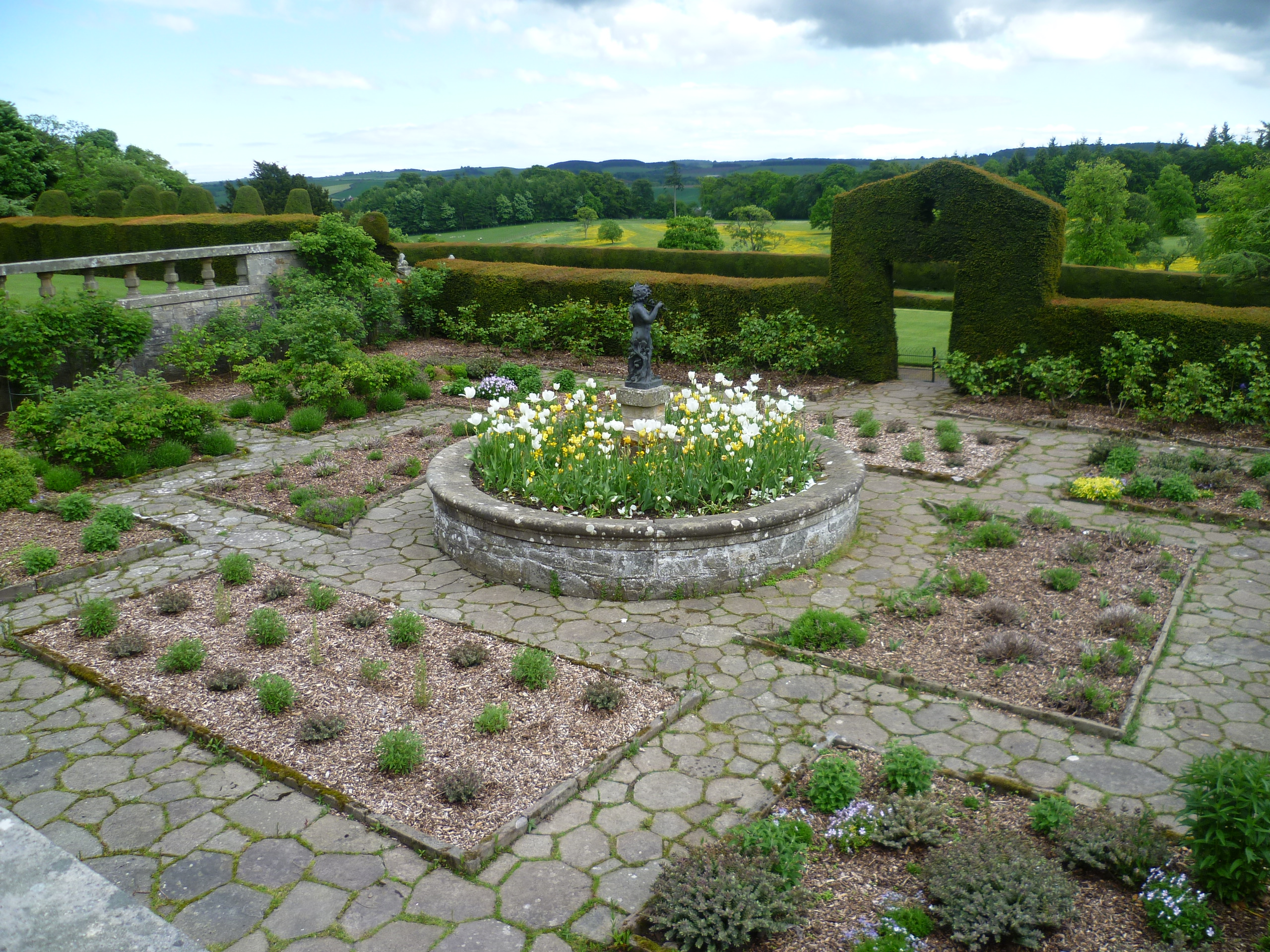
the flower garden

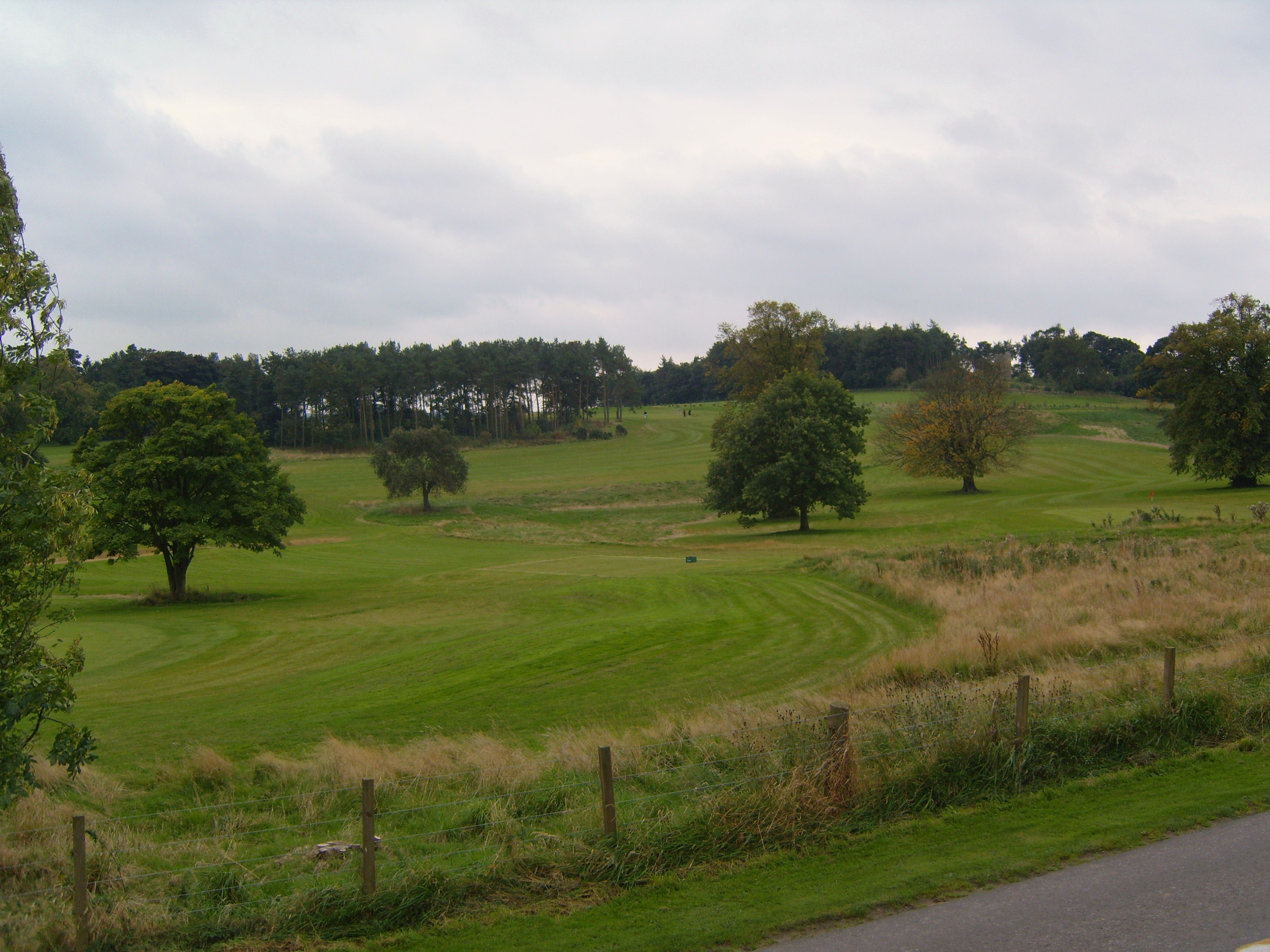
the golf course

Frederick Bower Sharp purchased Wemyss Hall and its then 1,223-acre (4.95 km^{2}) estate in 1904. Sharp's family had made their fortune in Dundee's jute industry as mill owners (and had sold cloth for sandbags to both sides during the American Civil War), and Sharp had added venture capital and rail transport to his business interests (he was chairman of the London, Midland and Scottish Railway). His intention was to construct a new family home with ready access to Dundee and to his golfing interests at St Andrews' Royal and Ancient Golf Club. He also wanted somewhere to house his already extensive collection of paintings, tapestries, furniture and porcelain. Although the location of Wemyss Hall met his requirements, the accommodation did not, and so he engaged the architect Sir Robert Lorimer. Lorimer had recently transformed Kellie Castle, just ten miles (16 km) away. Over the next two years, the new mansion house (named Hill of Tarvit) replaced the main block of the earlier house, although the rear service wings were retained. The new house was fitted with all modern conveniences, including electricity, an internal phone system and central heating. Sharp added a 9-hole golf course in 1924 to the south of the house.

Beatrice White, Frederick's wife, was born in 1864 at Castle Huntly in Longforgan, the fifth child of James Farquhar White, who had amassed a fortune trading with America in jute, linen and other 'dry goods'. She married Fred in 1896 - her older sister, Eleanor having married Fred's oldest brother, John Sharp in 1886. Beatrice's oldest brother was the liberal MP, J Martin White, who with his father had installed electricity at their house, Balruddery, in 1881, possibly the first house in Scotland and second in Britain after Cragside to have a domestic electrical generating plant (though Lord Kelvin at Largs had installed electricity earlier using batteries). Beatrice was thus well-equipped to partner Frederick in the modernisation of Hill of Tarvit and her house-keeping and hospitality were always considered exemplary.

Hugh Sharp (born 1897), Frederick and Beatrice's first child and only son, inherited the house on his father's death in 1932. Hugh, who had served with distinction during the 1914–18 war, added to the house's collection, his particular interests being rare books, and botanical specimens (many of which can still be seen in the gardens). In 1937, Hugh was travelling by rail to meet his fiancée Mabel Hogarth in Glasgow. He was one of 35 people killed when the Glasgow-Edinburgh express collided with a stationary train at Castlecary. (See Castlecary rail accidents.) His mother Beatrice continued to live at Hill of Tarvit until her death in 1946. Two years later, on the death of his sister Elizabeth (born 1909), the house and the family's collection was left to the National Trust for Scotland, with a sizable endowment for upkeep. Hugh's book collection was presented to the National Library of Scotland.

Until 1977, only the ground floor of the house was open to the public, and then only by appointment, the upper floors being used by the Marie Curie Foundation as a convalescent home. The fireplace which is situated in the billiard room originated in Scots Tarvit Tower. The monument at the top of Tarvit Hill was once the mercat cross in Cupar, which was won as a bet in a game a cards.
