= Arthur Collins (politician) =

New Zealand politician (1832–1911)

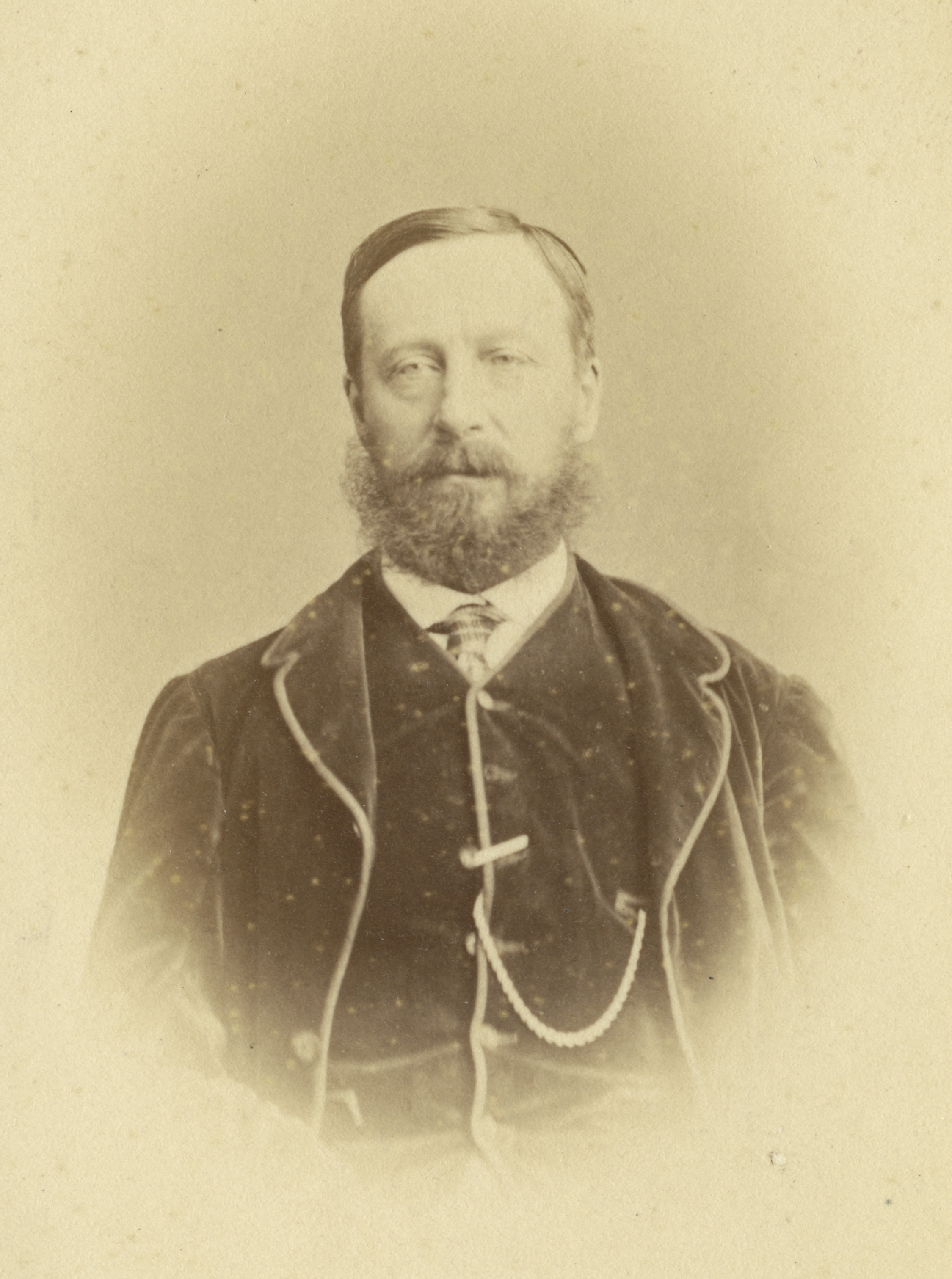
Arthur Collins in 1860

Arthur Shuckburgh Collins (31 December 1832 – 26 September 1911), later spelling his surname Collyns, was a 19th-century Member of Parliament from Nelson, New Zealand.

== Early life and education ==
Collins was born on 31 December 1832 in Devon, son of William Wrangham Collins (1799–1880) and Henrietta (1799–1861), daughter of Reverend Charles Shuckburgh, of The Moot, Downton, Wiltshire. He received a 'good education'. The family emigrated to Nelson on the Pekin from London, arriving on 15 January 1850. In his younger years, he excelled in sports.

== Career ==
New Zealand Parliament
Years	Term	Electorate	Party
1868–1870	4th	Collingwood	Independent
1871–1873	5th	Collingwood	Independent
1881	7th	Suburbs of Nelson	Independent

Collins represented the Collingwood electorate from 1868 to 1873, when he resigned. He was a Provincialist, but once elected, he changed his mind and became an ardent supporter of the abolition of the provinces. He then represented the Suburbs of Nelson electorate in 1881 from 11 January to 8 November, when he retired. He was a member of the Nelson Provincial Council from 13 Nov 1869 to 28 June 1872, representing the Nelson electorate. From March to June 1870, he was a member of the Nelson executive council.

== Personal life ==
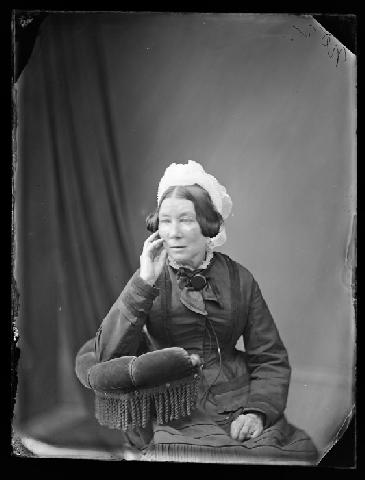
Collins's second wife, Erica Elspeth Collins, c. 1876)

On 29 September 1855, at Christchurch, Collins married Catherine Anne, daughter of Thomas Isaacson, of Brighton, East Sussex, and niece and adopted daughter of Reverend J. F. Isaacson, rector of Freshwater, Isle of Wight. They had three daughters: Henrietta, Adelaide, and Emily. Following Catherine's death, he married Erica Elspeth, daughter of James Mackay, of Drumduan, Nelson, New Zealand; they had five sons (the eldest being the teacher and cricketer John Ulric Collins) and five daughters. His daughter, Erica Catherine, married John Sharp, the son of John Sharp, in 1887.

In the 1870s, he changed the spelling of his surname to Collyns. He lived at Hillwood, near Nelson, and at Mount Fyffe, at Kaikōura.

Collyns died in Nelson on 26 September 1911. He is buried, as are his wives, at Wakapuaka Cemetery.

New Zealand Parliament
Preceded by Andrew Richmond	Member of Parliament for Collingwood; 1868–1873	Succeeded by William Gibbs
Preceded by Andrew Richmond	Member of Parliament for Suburbs of Nelson; 1881	Constituency abolished
