= James Mackay (New Zealand politician, born 1831) =

New Zealand politician (1831–1912)

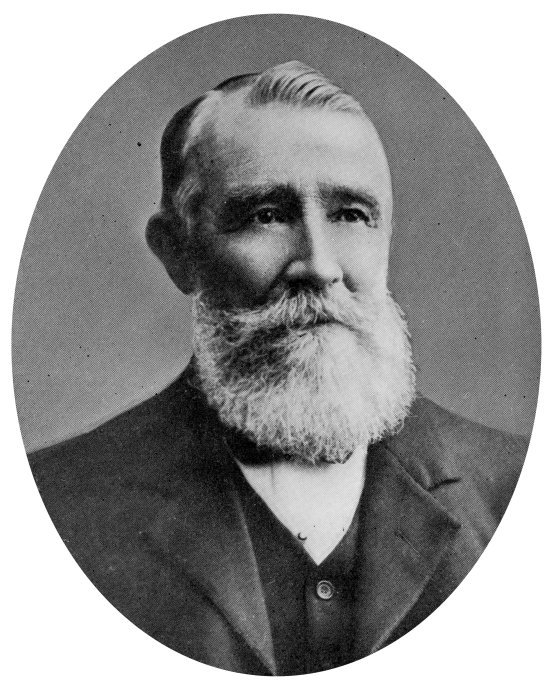
- Born: 16 November 1831; London
- Died: 10 October 1912 (aged 80); Paeroa
- Occupations: farmer, explorer, public servant, administrator, land purchaser, interpreter, advocate and politician
- Known for: purchase of the West Coast; opening of the Thames and Ohinemuri goldfields
- Spouse: Eliza Sophia Braithwaite (m. 1862)

James Mackay (16 November 1831 – 10 October 1912) was a New Zealand farmer, explorer, public servant, administrator, land purchaser, interpreter, advocate and politician.

== Early life and emigration to New Zealand ==
James Mackay was born in London, the eldest son of a banker. He was one of eight children born to James Mackay senior and Ann (née Charles) between 1829 and 1848. Two cousins were also raised with the family, the oldest of which, Alexander Mackay, was two years younger than James Mackay junior and described by him as being like a brother. He also had two half sisters from James Mackay senior's second marriage after the death of Ann in 1860.

In 1845 the family emigrated from London to Nelson Province in New Zealand on the Slains Castle. They established themselves just north of Nelson Town in an area called Wakapuaka on a farm they named Drumduan. Their land bordered on Maori reserve, and as James Mackay junior embraced colonial life, working twelve hour days on the farm as well as keeping up with his studies, he also became fluent in Maori.

== Run-holder and Assistant Native Secretary ==
In 1852, when James Mackay turned 21, with the help of his father he established a cattle run below Farewell Spit in Golden Bay. At that time Golden Bay was completely isolated from the rest of province, with a population consisting almost entirely of Maori living in several villages along the coast. In 1855 the first three families of agricultural settlers arrived, and at about the same time a sawmill was established at Motupipi. There was soon conflict between the sawyers and local Maori, and concerned about the way it was dealt with, Mackay appealed to the Native Secretary Donald McLean to appoint him into a position to mediate between Maori and Pakeha (Europeans).

The request was granted in 1857 after gold was discovered in the Aorere Valley and a large population of both Maori and Pakeha arrived at the diggings, which centred on the new town of Collingwood. Mackay was appointed Assistant Native Secretary on a salary of £100, but the salary for the amount of work involved was not enough, so he lobbied for a more substantial position. After the Goldfields Act came into force in 1859, which brought official law and order to the Collingwood Goldfield, Mackay was appointed Warden, Coroner and Resident Magistrate.

== Purchase of Kaikōura and the West Coast ==
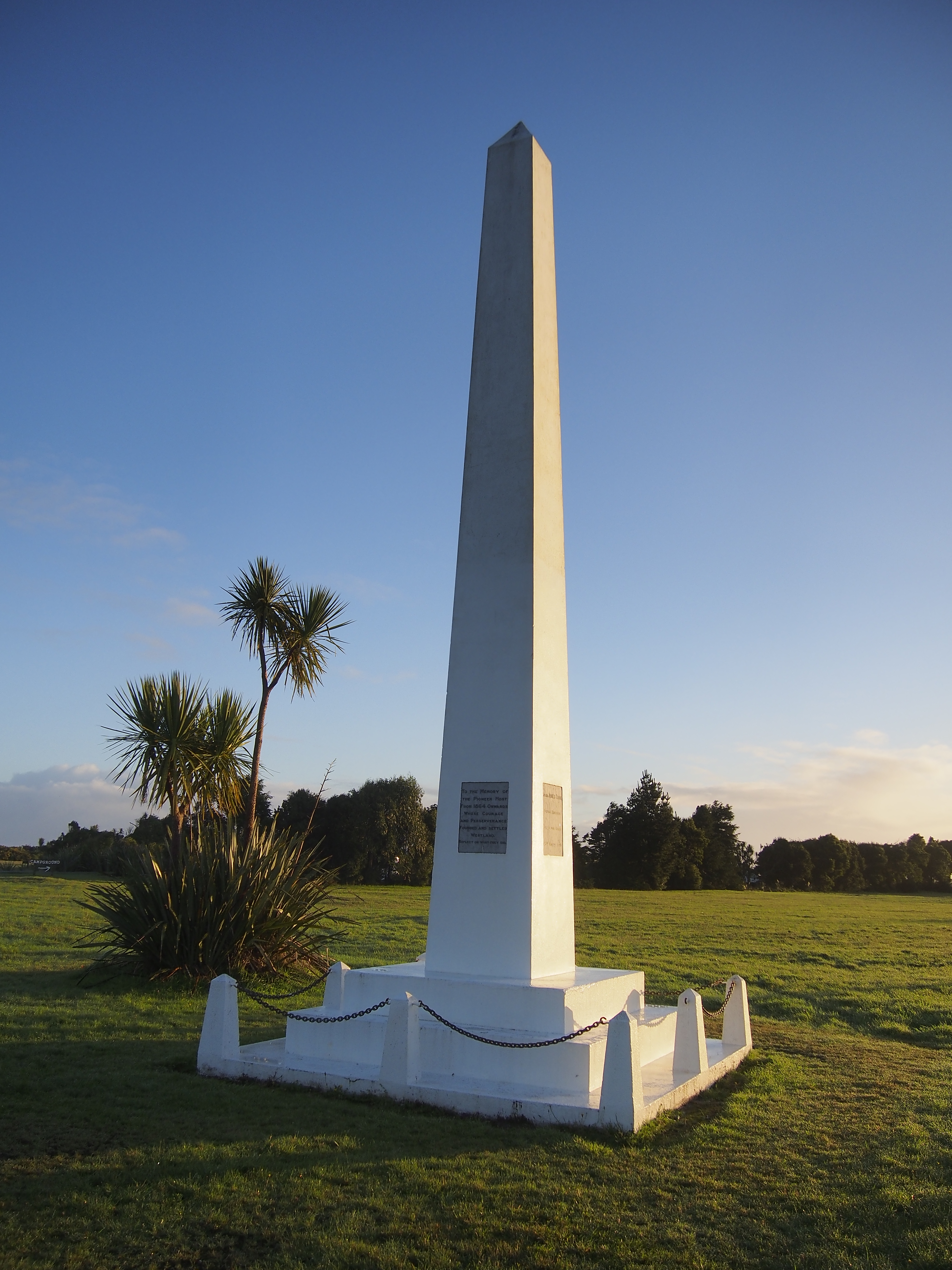
The Okarito Memorial Obelisk commemorates three key events of significance to the West Coast: Abel Tasman's sighting of 1642, James Cook's voyage of 1770, and James Mackay's purchase of Westland in 1860

Prior to the discovery of gold, Mackay's want for more land for his cattle sparked a series of explorations. He followed rumours from local Maori of large tracts of land existing in the mountainous hinterland of Golden Bay. He also travelled south along the West Coast as far as the Grey River, where he discovered plenty of land ready for settlement. He did not take up the land himself, however, because when he returned north the gold rush had set in and he was suddenly kept very busy selling his stock and mediating disputes in an unofficial capacity until his role of Assistant Native Secretary was confirmed.

While at the Grey River Mackay learnt from local Maori (Poutini Ngai Tahu) that they wanted settlers to come, but first the land needed to be purchased from them. He forwarded a letter addressed to the Native Secretary Donald McLean voicing their concerns about a previous deal whereby their land had been wrongfully sold to the Government by the Ngati Toa tribe. His report of the value of the land, and the need to extinguish the Poutini Ngai Tahu title before settlement could begin, brought that and a similar issue at Kaikōura to the attention of McLean. McLean appointed Mackay Acting Land Purchase Commissioner with instructions to purchase both the Kaikōura block and the entire West Coast.

Mackay set out for Kaikōura in February 1859 with his cousin Alexander to keep him company. He expected to conclude the purchase quickly but found the local Maori (Ngāi Tahu) much more numerous and aware of the value of the land than expected. They demanded £5000 and 200,000 acres of reserves, but Mackay was instructed to pay only £150 and allocate 10–100 acres per person. In the end he leaned on the fact that the Government had already purchased the land from Ngati Toa, and feigned packing up and leaving them with nothing, which compelled them to come back to the table and accept £300 and 5556 acres of reserves. He justified the over allocation of reserves by reporting that the greater portion of the land was "of the most useless and worthless description".

In April James and Alexander Mackay set out for the West Coast. They joined up with the Nelson surveyor John Rochfort and his chainmen before reaching the Alps, and caught out in snow, spent three weeks making the crossing. James and Alexander then waited on the West Coast for all the Maori of importance to assemble at Arahura, the centre of their greenstone (pounamu) industry. When negotiations at last began towards the end of July, Mackay again found the Maori demanding more money and reserves than he was permitted to allocate. They wanted £2,500 and an estimated area of 200,000 acres, and this time they were unmoved by his threats of dealing with Ngati Toa instead. When negotiations broke down, he was forced to go to Auckland to receive new instructions.

Mackay returned to the West Coast the following year, exploring an overland route from Nelson to the Grey Valley on the way. Negotiations resumed at Poherua, just north of the Okarito Lagoon, on 21 April 1860. Previously Mackay had offered £200 and 800 acres of reserves, now he offered £300 and 6000 acres of reserves, which the Poutini Ngai Tahu accepted, stressing that their greenstone should be protected with a large reserve at the Arahura. While allocating their various reserves, he reluctantly allowed them to keep the landing at the Grey River, even though it was an obvious place for a future town (Greymouth). The signing of the deed of purchase took place at the Grey River on 21 May 1860.

== Hauraki District Commissioner and Compensation Court ==
When Mackay resumed his duties at Collingwood in June 1860, part of his role involved monitoring local Te Ati Awa, who were closely related to the Te Ati Awa fighting a war against the Government over a block of land in Taranaki. In 1863, just prior to the second war in Taranaki and the Government invasion of the Waikato, the Maori King sent emissaries to Collingwood to invite Maori to return to land they had been forced to leave during the Musket Wars of the 1820s. After consulting with Governor George Grey, Mackay arrested the emissaries and took them to Auckland to face sedition charges at the Supreme Court. The men were later found not guilty, but while waiting for the trial, Grey commissioned Mackay to go to the Hauraki District to mediate between local "friendly" Maori and soldiers garrisoned there. He went further to convince several "hostile" Maori chiefs to turn away from the Maori King Movement, give up their arms, and swear allegiance to the Queen. As a result of Mackay's success, Grey appointed him a Civil Commissioner of the Hauraki District, and so he moved permanently to the North Island.

After moving north, Mackay became involved with the Compensation Court, firstly as a judge and then as an advocate for the Crown. The purpose of the Compensation Court was to investigate claims of Maori who believed their lands had been wrongly confiscated during the Taranaki, Waikato and Tauranga wars. The confiscations enabled the Government to take control of Maori lands, firstly directly through confiscation, then indirectly through compensation, which converted tribally owned land into individual titles. Once Maori land was fragmented, it was much easier to negotiate with individuals for purchase of the land for Pakeha settlement, instead of having to gain consensus from the entire tribe. The Native Land Court then continued the work of establishing individual titles for Maori land.

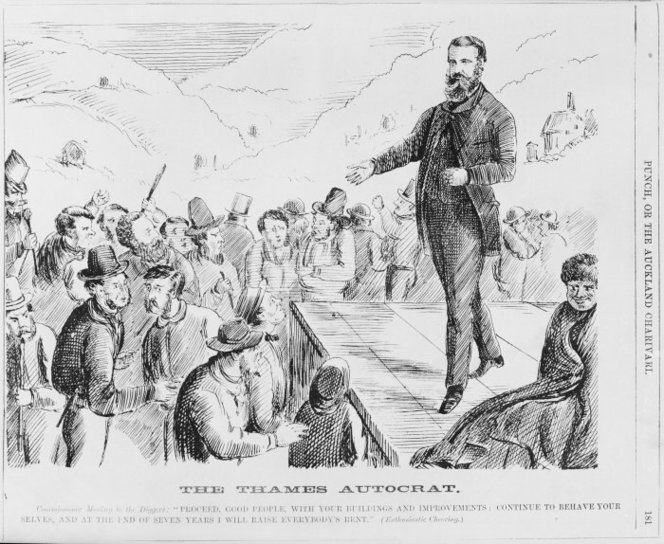
Cartoon of commissioner James Mackay addressing gold miners at Thames entitled, "The Thames Autocrat."

== Thames Goldfield Warden ==
It had long been known that gold existed in the Thames or Waihou Valley at the base of the Coromandel Peninsula. The only problem was that many of the local Maori were what was termed Land Leaguers, with affiliations to the Maori King. They refused to allow Pakeha to have access to the land, which kept the entire area closed. In 1867 Mackay negotiated to allow a part of the land to be prospected. The success of the prospectors caused a gold rush, and so Mackay moved to the new township of Shortland to become warden of the Thames Goldfield. He spent the next several years negotiating with individual Maori land owners to open up more ground for gold mining. By the end of 1868 he had extended the Thames Goldfield to the Hikutaia River, but the prize of the Ohinemuri, which was thought to be rich with gold, remained elusive.

In August 1868 Mackay resigned from all of his Government positions and began dealing privately in partnership with Wirope Hoterene (Willoughby Shortland) Taipari, who owned the land upon which the towns of Shortland and Graham's Town were built. The Government asked Mackay to reconsider his resignation because there was a lot of unfinished work which only he knew how to deal with. He agreed, but only if he could continue with private business at the same time. It was contentious among Thames business people that Mackay could set their rents in favour of his business partner Taipari. The situation continued for a year until a suitable person was found to replace him as Warden.

== Public and professional life ==
In December 1869 Mackay became a member of the Auckland Provincial Council representing Thames. He resigned after filing for bankruptcy eight and a half months later. At the end of September 1870, he applied for and was granted a discharge from bankruptcy. He then regained a seat on the Provincial Council after a member from Thames retired.

In 1872 the Minister of Public Works asked Mackay to return to purchasing land for the Government. At that time he was involved with private sales on the Coromandel Peninsula. He agreed to put aside his private dealings on the condition that he could finish negotiating the sale of kauri timber leases upon the same land which the government wanted to buy. Mackay therefore sold the timber on the land with 40-year leases, and then bought the land on behalf of the Crown, subject to the leases.

In 1873 Mackay was sent to the Waikato to keep the peace. A man named Timothy Sullivan had been murdered for trespassing on land belonging to the Maori King in April of that year, and there was fear of renewed hostilities. Mackay took control of the Waikato, both civil and military, until the end of June 1874, and managed to prevent the incident from escalating into another war.

When he returned from the Waikato he went back to negotiations with the Maori with great success. He gained a victory over the Land Leaguers by acquiring the first land sales in the Aroha Block on behalf of the Government. He followed this up by opening up the Ohinemuri for gold mining in 1875.

In May 1875, there was an inquiry into mining licenses which had been in Mackay's possession and had been illegally issued for the Ohinemuri Goldfield. At the same time, George Grey, now a member of parliament for City West in Auckland, began to call Mackay to account for having conducted private business in the Coromandel while being in Government employment. It was an attempt to break Mackay's personal hold over the now very important Hauraki District.

In July 1875 Mackay moved to Wellington to defend himself against the charges. He justified his land purchasing conduct with a report to Parliament in August, which was very scathing towards Grey, and his name was cleared of illegally issuing Ohinemuri mining rights in October.

In December 1875, despite already being a member for City West, Grey put himself forward as a candidate for the Thames seat. On nomination day Mackay also put himself forward, using his nomination speech as a means of attacking Grey. Mackay won the show of hands, but he withdrew when a poll was called for. He then entered a formal protest against Grey being eligible to stand on grounds that he was already an elected Member of Parliament. Though technically correct according to Parliamentary Practice, Mackay's protest was dismissed by an inquiry in July 1876.

In October 1877 Grey formed a Ministry to become Premier of New Zealand. When the Native Minister wanted Mackay to be his Under Secretary in early 1879, Grey wouldn't allow it. Also the Government refused to pay Mackay a large commission still owing for land which he had purchased on their behalf.

In April 1879, without official title or position, the Native Minister deputed Mackay to enquire into an escalating situation in Taranaki. The Maori of Parihaka were attempting to block Pakeha occupation of their land by peacefully occupying it themselves. After investigating the situation, Mackay recommended that there should be a commission set up with both Pakeha and Maori on its panel. But instead the Maori were arrested and the situation deteriorated until November 1881, when Parihaka was raided by police and its people either jailed or expelled.

After Grey's resignation in October 1879, Mackay was again able to gain Government appointments. He spent a year on the West Coast as Warden of the Goldfields at Greymouth. He was forced to resign after declaring bankruptcy in October 1880, very much out of pocket and still awaiting money owed to him for land sales in the north. When his discharge came two months later, he had returned to the North Island, where he took up jobs such as private land purchasing on commission, advocating for people at the Native Land Court and translating during Court sessions.

Mackay attempted to enter the House of Representatives as a member for the Coromandel in 1881 and 1887, but lost at the polls to Alfred Cadman. In 1896 Cadman accused Mackay of having misled the Government in 1872 when purchasing on their behalf at the Coromandel. Mackay responded, "I have been before the public for years, my private conduct may have been not altogether right, as I am subject to the same weaknesses as other men. But I can defy the world to say where I did wrong or acted in any way for my private interest against that of the general public".

== Personal life and death ==
In 1862 Mackay married Eliza Sophia Braithwaite in Nelson. She was six years his junior, the daughter of a prominent civil engineer. In 1864 they moved to Parnell in Auckland, where they had a son in July 1865 (who only lived for eight months) and a daughter in March 1867. During the second half of 1867 they moved to Shortland after Mackay became warden of the Thames Goldfield. In 1869 Mackay went to Auckland and sent Eliza a letter of separation.

Mackay and his wife were separated for many years while she remained in Shortland and he was living in Auckland or dealing in the Coromandel. They also had several reconciliations, living together in Shortland, Wellington, Greymouth, Gisborne and Paeroa. During their time apart Mackay was in relationships with at least two other women: Ema Te Aouru, otherwise known as Puahaere; and Margaret Sullivan, who lived with him as his wife in Freeman's Bay, Auckland.

Puahaere was a high ranking chief from the Coromandel. She was the daughter of Aotea Te Paratene and King Tūkāroto Matutaera Pōtatau Te Wherowhero Tāwhiao. Mackay and Puahaere had a daughter named Parearohi (also known as Arihia). They also possibly had a son.

Mackay's relationship with Margaret Sullivan probably came to an end after he almost died in 1892 from self-harm. By 1895 he was living again with Eliza. They settled at Paeroa where he worked as a mining advocate and licensed interpreter. By 1897 they lived on the same or adjoining property as their daughter and her husband at a farm called Danesfort, just outside of Paeroa.

In 1911, a year before his death, Mackay was visited by the historian James Cowan at his house in Paeroa. Cowan described him as lying paralysed, and subsisting on a tiny compassionate Government allowance of £1 per week. Mackay died in 1912 at the age of 80. Eliza died in 1915 at the age of 77, and was buried next to her husband at Paeroa.
