= The Colonist (New Zealand newspaper) =

Defunct New Zealand newspaper

The Colonist was a newspaper published in Nelson, New Zealand. It was published from 1857 to 1920.
