= Motupipi =

Locality in Tasman District, New Zealand

- locality
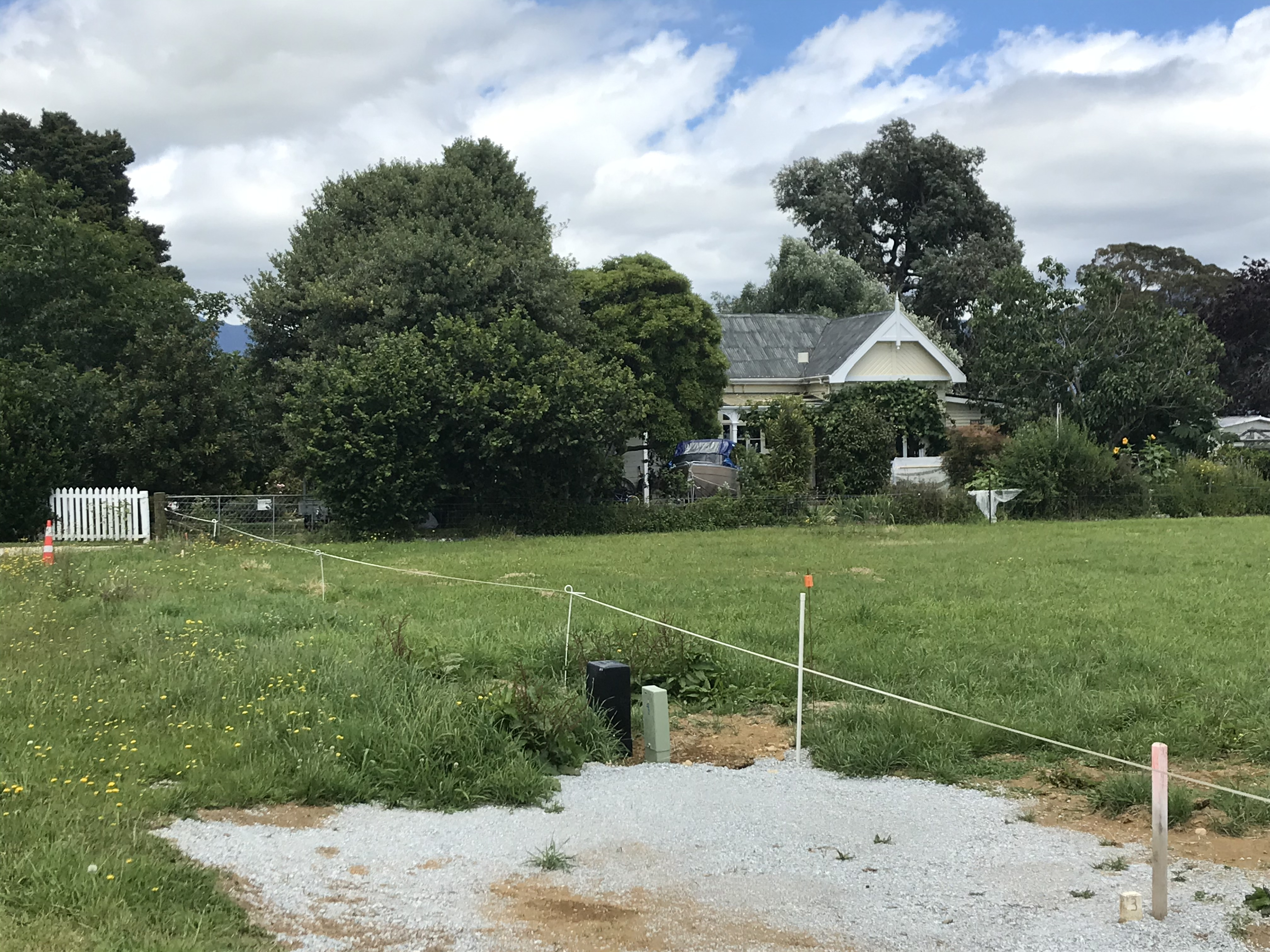
- View of Harwood House in Motupipi, registered as Category II by Heritage New Zealand
- Interactive map of Motupipi
- Coordinates: 40°51′22″S 172°50′56″E
- Country: New Zealand
- Territorial authority: Tasman
- Ward: Golden Bay
- Electorates: West Coast-Tasman; Te Tai Tonga

Government
  - Territorial authority: Tasman District Council
  - Mayor of Tasman: Tim King
  - West Coast-Tasman MP: Maureen Pugh
  - Te Tai Tonga MP: Tākuta Ferris

Area
  - Total: 55.52 km^{2} (21.44 sq mi)

Population (2023 census)
  - Total: 333
  - Density: 6.00/km^{2} (15.5/sq mi)

Motupipi is a settlement in the Tasman District of New Zealand's upper South Island, located at the mouth of the Motupipi River east of Tākaka. It was the first place in Golden Bay / Mohua where Europeans settled.

The name Motupipi translates as the island or bush (motu) with pipi shellfish, referring to the pipi which are found on the beach.

== History ==
=== European settlement ===
James Lovell and his wife Ann were the first Europeans to come to what was then known as Massacre Bay (now Golden Bay / Mohua). They landed at the beach in Motupipi after a two-day journey by whaleboat from Nelson in late 1842. At the time, there was a pā at the mouth of the Motupipi River, where between 200 and 300 people lived. The Lovells had their second daughter at Motupipi, the first pākeha child born in Golden Bay. Benjamin Lovell and family (he was a brother of James) lived in Motupipi in the early years. Joseph Packard and family had been talked into moving to Motupipi by James Lovell; the Lovells and Packards were the first pākeha in Golden Bay. More European settlement began in 1850. The settlement began as about 1500 acres of small dairy, fruit, and hop farms.

There are records of several notable early settlers:

- Peter Packer and his parents were among the original settlers. He took over 150 acres in 1872, and was clearing, sowing and farming most of it by 1905.
- Reuben Packard, who moved to the area with his parents a few years later, also took up 150 acres, which he cleared for sheep and beef farming.
- Joseph Packard was born in Suffolk, England in 1826 and was the oldest early settler. He originally purchased a 50-acre block, before taking a 300-acre block which he used to graze a few cows and sheep and plant about 300 lemon trees.
- Thomas Harwood, who was born at sea to parents from Yeovil in Somersetshire, England, purchased 235 acres of forested limestone land in 1868, which he began clearing and farming 1876. He initially farmed cattle, but transitioned by sheep farming in the early 20th century. By 1905, he had cleared and cultivated about 130 acres of the property. Harwood was also an active local politician.

The Golden Bay Coal Company began mining for coal at Motupipi in the early 20th century.

== Demographics ==
Motupipi locality covers 55.52 km^{2} (21.44 sq mi). It is part of the larger Pōhara-Abel Tasman statistical area.

Historical population
| Year | Pop. | ±% p.a. |
|---|---|---|
| 2006 | 273 | — |
| 2013 | 309 | +1.79% |
| 2018 | 321 | +0.76% |
| 2023 | 333 | +0.74% |

Motupipi had a population of 333 in the 2023 New Zealand census, an increase of 12 people (3.7%) since the 2018 census, and an increase of 24 people (7.8%) since the 2013 census. There were 156 males, 165 females, and 6 people of other genders in 132 dwellings. 4.5% of people identified as LGBTIQ+. There were 48 people (14.4%) aged under 15 years, 45 (13.5%) aged 15 to 29, 171 (51.4%) aged 30 to 64, and 66 (19.8%) aged 65 or older.

People could identify as more than one ethnicity. The results were 93.7% European (Pākehā), 8.1% Māori, 1.8% Asian, and 3.6% other, which includes people giving their ethnicity as "New Zealander". English was spoken by 99.1%, Māori by 1.8%, and other languages by 13.5%. The percentage of people born overseas was 27.9, compared with 28.8% nationally.

Religious affiliations were 18.9% Christian, 1.8% Hindu, 1.8% Buddhist, 2.7% New Age, and 1.8% other religions. People who answered that they had no religion were 67.6%, and 7.2% of people did not answer the census question.

Of those at least 15 years old, 78 (27.4%) people had a bachelor's or higher degree, 150 (52.6%) had a post-high school certificate or diploma, and 51 (17.9%) people exclusively held high school qualifications. 18 people (6.3%) earned over $100,000 compared to 12.1% nationally. The employment status of those at least 15 was 105 (36.8%) full-time, 69 (24.2%) part-time, and 3 (1.1%) unemployed.

== Education ==
Motupipi School is a co-educational state primary school for Year 1 to 6 students, with a roll of 83 as of July 2026.

The school opened about 1859, however, it celebrated its centenary in 1970. By 1905, the school was a one-roomed building with a roll of 60 students and capacity for 10 more.
