= 3rd New Zealand Parliament =

Term of the Parliament of New Zealand

3rd Parliament of New Zealand
←	2nd Parliament	4th Parliament	→

Overview
- Legislative body: New Zealand Parliament
- Term: 3 June 1861 – 30 October 1865
- Election: 1860–1861 general election
- Government: First Stafford ministry (until 1861); Second Fox ministry (1861–1862); Domett ministry (1862–1863); Whitaker-Fox ministry (1863–1864); Weld ministry (1864–1865); Second Stafford ministry (from 1865)

House of Representatives
- Members: 53
- Speaker of the House: David Monro
- Colonial Secretary: Edward Stafford — from 16 October 1865; Frederick Weld — 24 November 1864 – 16 October 1865 Alfred Domett — 6 August 1862 – 30 October 1863; William Fox — 12 July 1861 – 6 August 1862; Edward Stafford — until 12 July 1861

Legislative Council
- Members: 21 (at start); 35 (at end)
- Speaker of the Council: Thomas Bartley
- Colonial Secretary: Frederick Whitaker — 30 October 1863 – 24 November 1864

Sovereign
- Monarch: HM Victoria
- Governor: HE Rt. Hon Sir George Grey from December 1861 — HE Rt. Hon Colonel Thomas Browne until 3 October 1861

The 3rd New Zealand Parliament was a term of the Parliament of New Zealand. Elections for this term were held between 12 December 1860 and 28 March 1861 in 43 electorates to elect 53 MPs. Two electorates were added to this during this term, Gold Fields District (overlaid over existing Otago electorates) and a new Dunedin electorate created by splitting the existing City of Dunedin into Dunedin and Suburbs North and Dunedin and Suburbs South, increasing the number of MPs to 57. During the term of this Parliament, six Ministries were in power.

== Historical context ==
The third Parliament opened on 3 June 1861 (after a postponement from the previously announced date of 30 May 1861), following New Zealand's 1860–1861 election. It was the second Parliament under which New Zealand had responsible government, meaning that unlike the first Parliament, the Cabinet was chosen (although not officially appointed) by Parliament rather than by the Governor.

Political parties had not been established yet; this only happened after the 1890 election. Anyone attempting to form an administration thus had to win support directly from individual MPs. This made first forming, and then retaining a government difficult and challenging.

The third Parliament sat during the time of the New Zealand wars. Even before the first session started, William Cutfield King (representing the Grey and Bell electorate) was killed in the First Taranaki War. Marmaduke Nixon (Franklin electorate) was killed in action in 1864 whilst leading an assault on a Māori village during the Invasion of Waikato.

== Ministries ==
Since 1856, the first Stafford Ministry, led by Edward Stafford, was in place. This was the third administration under responsible government, and it was dissolved on 12 July 1861. Stafford was the third Premier of New Zealand. William Fox then formed the second Fox Ministry, which was in place from 12 July 1861 to 6 August 1862. Fox had previously been the Premier under the second administration. Alfred Domett, the fourth Premier, led the fifth administration, the Domett Ministry. This was in place from 6 August 1862 until 30 October 1863.

The Whitaker–Fox Ministry was the next administration, led by Frederick Whitaker as the fifth Premier. This administration was in place from 30 October 1863 to 24 November 1864. This was followed by the Weld Ministry under Frederick Weld as the sixth Premier. This was in place from 24 November 1864 to 16 October 1865. A few months before the 1866 general elections, Stafford once again became Premier on 16 October 1865, leading the second Stafford Ministry. This lasted well into the term of the fourth Parliament on 28 June 1869.

== Sessions ==
Parliament sat for five sessions:

Session	from	to
First	3 June 1861	7 September 1861
Second	7 July 1862	15 September 1862
Third	19 October 1863	14 December 1863
Fourth	24 November 1864	13 December 1864
Fifth	26 July 1865	30 October 1865

The first session started on 30 May 1861. Ever since Parliament had first met in 1854 in Auckland, an argument was had for the members to meet in a more central place. The second session of the 3rd Parliament was the first to meet outside of Auckland; the buildings of the Wellington Provincial Council were used for this session. A proposal to make this move to Wellington permanent was lost by a single vote.

The fifth session started on 26 July 1865 and Parliament was prorogued on 30 October.

== Electoral boundaries for the third Parliament ==
43 electorates were used for the 1860–61 elections. This was a significant increase from the previous 28 electorates, and resulted from the passage of the Representation Act 1860.

== Initial composition of the third Parliament ==
53 seats were created across the 43 electorates. The City of Wellington electorate was the only three-member electorate, and eight electorates were represented by two members. The remaining 34 electorates were represented by a single member.

Member	Electorate	Province	MP's term	Election date
Augustus White	Akaroa	Canterbury	First	13 February 1861
Thomas Russell	Auckland East	Auckland	First	11 January 1861
Josiah Firth	Auckland West	Auckland	First	11 January 1861
John Williamson	Auckland West	Auckland	Second	11 January 1861
Alfred Creyke	Avon	Canterbury	First	1 February 1861
Hugh Carleton	Bay of Islands	Auckland	Third	13 February 1861
Thomas Gillies	Bruce	Otago	Second	11 February 1861
Charles Kettle	Bruce	Otago	First	11 February 1861
Frederick Weld	Cheviot	Canterbury	Third	1 March 1861
John Cracroft Wilson	City of Christchurch	Canterbury	First	31 January 1861
John Ormond	Clive	Hawke's Bay	First	20 February 1861
Andrew Richmond	Collingwood	Nelson	First	4 February 1861
Thomas Dick	City of Dunedin	Otago	First	24 December 1860
Edward McGlashan	City of Dunedin	Otago	First	24 December 1860
Thomas Rowley	Ellesmere	Canterbury	First	25 January 1861
Robert Graham	Franklin	Auckland	Second	28 January 1861
Marmaduke Nixon	Franklin	Auckland	First	28 January 1861
William King	Grey and Bell	Taranaki	First	27 November 1860
Thomas Fraser	Hampden	Otago	First	20 February 1861
George Hall	Heathcote	Canterbury	First	12 February 1861
William Fitzherbert	Hutt	Wellington	Second	12 December 1860
Alfred Renall	Hutt	Wellington	Second	12 December 1860
Isaac Cookson	Kaiapoi	Canterbury	Second	7 February 1861
Crosbie Ward	Town of Lyttelton	Canterbury	Second	25 January 1861
John Munro	Marsden	Auckland	First	20 January 1861
William Butler	Mongonui	Auckland	First	30 January 1861
Herbert Curtis	Motueka	Nelson	Second	5 February 1861
Henry Stark	Napier	Hawke's Bay	First	19 February 1861
Alfred Domett	City of Nelson	Nelson	Second	27 December 1860
Edward Stafford	City of Nelson	Nelson	Second	27 December 1860
James Wemyss	Suburbs of Nelson	Nelson	First	28 January 1861
William Richmond	Town of New Plymouth	Taranaki	Second	28 December 1860
George Graham	Newton	Auckland	First	28 January 1861
Thomas Henderson	Northern Division	Auckland	Second	22 January 1861
James O'Neill	Northern Division	Auckland	Second	22 January 1861
James Richmond	Omata	Taranaki	First	30 November 1860
Maurice O'Rorke	Town of Onehunga	Auckland	First	18 January 1861
Reader Wood	Parnell	Auckland	First	15 January 1861
William Mason	Pensioner Settlements	Auckland	First	21 January 1861
David Monro	Picton	Marlborough	Third	16 February 1861
Alfred Brandon	Porirua	Wellington	Second	20 December 1860
Charles Taylor	Raglan	Auckland	Third	11 February 1861
William Fox	Rangitiki	Wellington	Second	4 February 1861
Francis Jollie	Timaru	Canterbury	First	25 March 1861
Alfred Saunders	Waimea	Marlborough	First	1 February 1861
Charles Carter	Wairarapa	Wellington	Second	12 December 1860
William Eyes	Wairau	Marlborough	First	15 February 1861
Dillon Bell	Wallace	Otago	Second	14 March 1861
Walter Mantell	Wallace	Otago	First	14 March 1861
Henry Harrison	Wanganui	Wellington	First	1 February 1861
Isaac Featherston	City of Wellington	Wellington	Third	11 December 1860
William Rhodes	City of Wellington	Wellington	Third	11 December 1860
William Taylor	City of Wellington	Wellington	First	11 December 1860

== Changes during term ==
There were numerous changes during the term of the third Parliament.

=== List of by-elections ===
By-election	Electorate	Date	Incumbent	Reason	Winner
1861	Grey and Bell	20 June	William King	Death	Harry Atkinson
1861	Suburbs of Nelson	20 June	James Wemyss	Resignation	William Wells
1861	Napier	1 July	Henry Stark	Resignation	William Colenso
1861	Wanganui	5 July	Henry Harrison	Resignation	Henry Harrison
1862 (1st)	City of Dunedin	17 March	Thomas Dick	Resignation	Thomas Dick
1862	Town of New Plymouth	5 May	William Richmond	Resignation	Isaac Watt
1862 (2nd)	City of Dunedin	30 May	Edward McGlashan	Resignation	John Richardson
1862	Ellesmere	9 June	Thomas Rowley	Resignation	James FitzGerald
1862	Avon	11 June	Alfred Creyke	Resignation	William Thomson
1862	Heathcote	12 June	George Hall	Resignation	William Moorhouse
1862	City of Auckland West	14 June	Josiah Firth	Resignation	James Williamson
1862	Bruce	31 July	Charles Kettle	Death	Edward Cargill
1862 (3rd)	City of Dunedin	15 November	John Richardson	Resignation	James Paterson
1862	Hampden	4 December	Thomas Fraser	Absence	John Jones
==== Supplementary election, 1863 ====
Dunedin and Suburbs North		28 March 1863			John Richardson
Dunedin and Suburbs South		6 April 1863			William Reynolds
Gold Fields		14 April 1863			William Baldwin; George Brodie
By-election	Electorate	Date	Incumbent	Reason	Winner
==== 3rd Parliament (continued) ====
1863	Dunedin and Suburbs South	20 June	James Paterson	Resignation	James Paterson
1863	Hampden	2 July	John Jones	Resignation	Frederick Wayne
1863	Kaiapoi	2 September	Isaac Cookson	Resignation	Robert Wilkin
1863	Dunedin and Suburbs North	3 September	Thomas Dick	Resignation	Julius Vogel
1863	Town of New Plymouth	9 October	Isaac Watt	Resignation	Henry Turton
1863	Heathcote	28 October	William Moorhouse	Resignation	Alfred Cox
1863	Akaroa	30 October	Augustus White	Resignation	Lancelot Walker
1864	Franklin	13 October	Marmaduke Nixon	Death (KIA)	Theodore Haultain
1864	Town of New Plymouth	18 November	Henry Turton	Resignation	Charles Brown
1864	Waimea	29 November	Alfred Saunders	Resignation	John Miles
1865 (1st)	Bruce	8 April	Thomas Gillies	Resignation	Arthur Burns
1865	Raglan	19 April	Charles Taylor	Resignation	William Buckland
1865	Parnell	20 April	Reader Wood	Resignation	Robert Creighton
1865	Town of New Plymouth	19 May	Charles Brown	Resignation	Henry Sewell
1865	Gold Fields	29 May	William Baldwin	Resignation	Charles Haughton
1865	Rangitiki	10 July	William Fox	Resignation	Robert Pharazyn
1865	Omata	18 July	James Richmond	Appointed to Legislative Council	Francis Gledhill
1865 (2nd)	Bruce	26 July	Edward Cargill	Resignation	James Macandrew
1865	Wairarapa	29 July	Charles Carter	Resignation	Henry Bunny

=== Existing electorates ===
Akaroa

White resigned in 1863 and was succeeded by Lancelot Walker.

Auckland West

Firth resigned on 30 April 1862. He was succeeded by James Williamson.

Avon

Creyke resigned on 21 April 1862. He was succeeded by William Thomson.

Bruce

Kettle died on 5 June 1862. Edward Cargill succeeded him in the 1862 by-election. In 1865, Edward Cargill resigned. The resulting second by-election in 1865, held on 26 July, was contested by James Macandrew and John Cargill. Macandrew and J. Cargill received 207 and 34 votes, and Macandrew was declared elected.

Gillies resigned and the subsequent first 1865 by-election was won on 8 April 1865 by Arthur John Burns.

City of Dunedin

Edward McGlashan resigned in 1861. Successors were John Richardson (1862) and James Paterson (1862–63).
Dick resigned in 1863.

The electorate was abolished in 1863 and replaced with the two Dunedin suburb electorates listed below.

Ellesmere

Rowley resigned in 1862 and was succeeded by James FitzGerald.

Franklin

Nixon was killed in action during the Invasion of Waikato on 27 May 1864. He was succeeded by Theodore Haultain.

Grey and Bell

King was killed on 8 February 1861. He was succeeded by Harry Atkinson.

Hampden

Fraser was vacated for absence in 1862. He was succeeded by John Richard Jones who resigned in 1863, and was replaced by Frederick Wayne.

Heathcote

G. Hall resigned in 1862. He was first succeeded by William Sefton Moorhouse (1862–63), then Alfred Cox (1863–65).

Kaiapoi

Cookson resigned in 1863. He was succeeded by Robert Wilkin.

Napier

Stark resigned in 1861. He was succeeded by William Colenso.

New Plymouth

William Richmond resigned in 1862. He was first succeeded by Isaac Newton Watt (1862–63), then Henry Hanson Turton (1863–64), and then Charles Brown (1864–65).

Parnell

Wood resigned in 1865. He was succeeded by Robert James Creighton.

Raglan

Charles John Taylor resigned in 1865. He was succeeded by William Buckland.

Suburbs of Nelson

Wemyss resigned in 1861. He was succeeded by William Wells.

Waimea

Saunders resigned in 1864. He was succeeded by John George Miles.

Wairarapa

Carter resigned in 1865. He was succeeded by Henry Bunny.

=== New electorates ===
Dunedin and Suburbs South

Dunedin and Suburbs South was established in 1862 as a two-member electorate. It was represented by two MPs: William Reynolds (from 4 December 1862) and James Paterson (from 29 April 1863) until the end of the term.

Dunedin and Suburbs North

Dunedin and Suburbs North was established in 1863 as a two-member electorate. It was represented by John Richardson (from 20 April 1863) and Julius Vogel (from 29 September 1863) until the end of the term.

Goldfields

The Goldfields electorate was established in 1862, during the term of the third Parliament. This was a reaction to the large influx of people to Otago during the Otago gold rush, and because the franchise had been extended to males aged 21 years and over who had held a miner's right continuously for at least three (or six) months. No electoral rolls were established for these districts, and to vote a miner just presented his miner's licence to the election official. Outside Otago where no special Goldfields electorate existed, miners could register as electors in the ordinary electoral district where they lived.

William Baldwin and George Brodie were elected in the 1863 Goldfields by-election. Baldwin resigned on 27 April 1865. Charles Edward Haughton won the resulting 1865 by-election held on 29 May contested by three candidates.
