= Learmonth White Dalrymple =

New Zealand educationalist

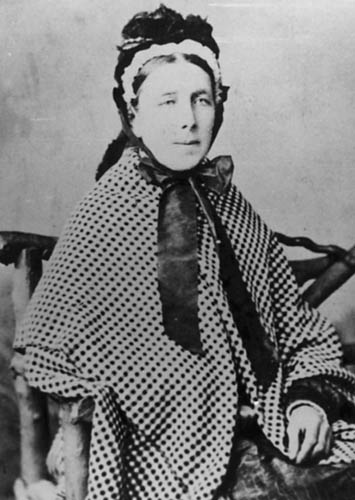
- Learmonth Dalrymple
- Born: 1827; Coupar Angus, Angus, Scotland
- Died: 26 August 1906 (aged 79); Dunedin, New Zealand
- Known for: educationalist

Learmonth White Dalrymple (c.1827–26 August 1906) was a New Zealand educationalist who campaigned for girls' secondary education in Dunedin and for women to be admitted to the University of Otago. This was the first Australasian university to agree to this and the school is said to be the first public high school for girls in the Southern hemisphere.

== Early life ==
She was born in Coupar Angus, Angus, Scotland about 1827, the eldest of nine children. Her unusual name most likely comes from the Learmonth family, which married into the Dalrymple family. However, her name was registered as Larmonth at baptism on 21 July 1827. She went to school at Madras College in St Andrews. She later considered her schooling inadequate, particularly lacking in mathematical training, which her father considered an unsuitable subject for women. Her mother Janet (née Taylor) died on 23 February 1840, leaving eight surviving children. Her father William Dalrymple, an ironmonger and trader in minerals, manure and grain, remarried Margaret Saunders, but she died within a year or two. Learmonth travelled extensively in Europe and learned fluent French, but also took over much of the work of raising her siblings.

William decided to emigrate to Wellington, New Zealand, and sailed on the Rajah from Gravesend on 14 June 1853 with Learmonth and three other of his children. A fifth joined them in New Zealand some years later. The trip was an eventful one, as they encountered a pirate ship. All women and children were issued weapons and brought on deck, which deterred the pirates. Near Tasmania, the Rajah was damaged in a storm, with a wave sweeping over the decks, carrying away the boats and cooking galley, and doing extensive damage to the stern. The ship stopped at Dunedin for two months for repairs before continuing to Wellington. The Dalrymples decided to return to Otago, where they settled first at Goodwood and then by 1857 at Kaihiku, south-west of Dunedin, where Learmonth ran the household while establishing a Sunday school.

== Campaigns for female education ==
In August 1863 the Otago Boys' High School opened. To mark the occasion, The Otago Daily Times published an editorial (probably written by Julius Vogel) calling for an equivalent girls' school. Dalrymple read this and wrote in support of the idea to her neighbour John Richardson, who was a member of parliament and Speaker of the Otago Provincial Council. He replied encouraging her and suggesting she organise a petition to the Provincial Council. He had in mind that she could gather a dozen signatures over a week, but Dalrymple wrote out ten or twelve copies of a petition calling for girls' school "which would be accessible to the middle and wealthier classes" and organised women to canvass for signatures for each. They met with a varied reception; some people, both men and women, were antagonistic or ridiculed the idea, while others gave "delightfully encouraging words". Richardson and William Reynolds moved in the Provincial Council that a scheme for girls' education should be presented to the next session. The motion passed unanimously, but nothing resulted from it.

Dalrymple organised a public meeting in Dunedin in November 1865. She felt unable to chair the meeting because it was not appropriate for an unmarried woman to do so, but persuaded a Mrs Thomas to take that position on the understanding that Dalrymple would do all the talking. About thirty women attended, but the meeting was disrupted by a couple of interruptions, and then had to be abandoned because a German band practising outside made speech impossible. The petition was presented to the Provincial Council in early December 1865. It was passed to a Select Committee on Education, which praised it and recommended it be implemented, but no action was taken.

Dalrymple formed a Ladies' Committee of the High School for Girls, wrote numerous letters over the next two years (between 700 and 800 over the seven-year campaign) and held public and private meetings to keep the issue in front of the Provincial Council and the public. She moved to Port Chalmers, which gave her greater access to the city. The Otago Daily Times and the Otago Witness both gave strong support to her movement, and Richardson made public speeches for it. In 1868, Vogel, now the Provincial Treasurer, was persuaded to include £1000 in the estimates for the establishment of a girls' high school, but this failed to pass. Dalrymple wrote to Superintendent James Macandrew's wife and persuaded her to allow a meeting with her husband. This was so successful that Macandrew requested the Education Board to create a proposal, and from that proposal created an Education Commission "to determine the best site and scheme for a High School and to consider whether it is expedient that provision should be made in the same building for the teaching of girls as well as boys".

The Ladies' Committee called a new public meeting and prepared a new petition. There was lively correspondence in the newspapers over the nature of a new school, with some supporting a co-educational school and others a girls' school. The meeting was held on 21 May 1869 and about 40 women attended. The meeting recommended that a girls' high school be established, similar to the existing boys' school, and put forward principles of operation for it. Dalrymple forwarded the recommendation to the Education Commission. Two newspapers supported the resolution with editorials, and the Otago Schoolmasters' Association also passed a motion of support. The Education Commission warmly received the proposal and supported many of its suggestions. In 1870 the Provincial Council and Education Board made arrangements for the opening of the new school, and the Otago Provincial School for Girls opened on 6 February 1871 – the first public girls' high school in the Southern hemisphere. The school was later renamed Otago Girls' High School.

The University of Otago opened in July 1871 with Richardson as its Chancellor. The university council had not initially considered whether women should be admitted as students, but Richardson in his inaugural speech mentioned that Colleges for women would be formed "in due time". One professor, G. S. Sale, issued an open invitation for women to attend his classics lectures, which attracted no opposition. On 31 July Dalrymple and her committee circulated a petition calling for women to be admitted to the university, saying that a degree would be a certificate to encourage study and raise teaching standards amongst women. They gained 149 signatures in a week, with The Otago Daily Times supporting them on 2 August 1871. The petition was presented to the university council on 8 August, and they unanimously resolved that women should be admitted, but that they would compete for certificates, the equivalent of degrees. This was the first university in Australasia to accept women students.

== Later life ==
Dalrymple worked to improve kindergarten education, writing a pamphlet and requesting to Parliament that they establish the Frobel system of pre-school learning. She also became a member of the Association for Promoting the Practice and Study of Economics in the Schools of the Colony, which advocated setting up savings banks in schools. She continued to support the Girls' School, donating a prize to it each year and founded a scholarship for women at the university.

She moved to Feilding in 1881 with her father. There she was active in the Women's Christian Temperance Movement of New Zealand (WCTU NZ) and women's suffrage movement. She signed the 1893 suffrage petition while living in Feilding. By 1896 she was living south of Feilding in Levin where she continued to participate in civic activities such as voting and education reform. She was the organizing president of the Levin chapter of the WCTU NZ as well as the national Superintendent of the Bible in Schools department. By 1902 she also served as the WCTU NZ Superintendent of Peace and Arbitration. However, she did not stop addressing the youth-oriented justice issues close to her heart: Bible in schools, boys and smoking, savings banks in schools, as well as the problem of barmaids as degrading for young women and being used to lure young men to drink to excess.

== Death and legacy ==
She returned to Dunedin about 1901 as her health failed, and died there on 26 August 1906.

Otago Girls' High School hung a portrait of her in the school hall in 1896, and named the Dalrymple Block, a specialist building, after her in 1960.
