= Dunedin and Suburbs South =

Dunedin and Suburbs South was a parliamentary electorate in the city of Dunedin in Otago, New Zealand from 1862 to 1866. From 1863 it was a multi-member electorate.

== History ==
During the second session (from 7 July to 15 September 1862) of the 3rd Parliament, the Representation Act 1862 was passed. The Act stipulated that the two-member City of Dunedin electorate was to be abolished in 1863 and replaced with Dunedin and Suburbs North and Dunedin and Suburbs South. Clause 9 of the Act read:

The existing two members of the City of Dunedin shall thenceforth, as long as they retain their seats, be respectively members of the district of Dunedin and suburbs North and Dunedin and suburbs South, in manner following, that is to say, the earliest elected member shall be a member for the district of Dunedin and suburbs North, and the last elected member shall be a member for the district of Dunedin and suburbs South.

The first elected member was Thomas Dick, but he resigned from the City of Dunedin electorate during 1863, so a new election had to be held to determine the representative for Dunedin and Suburbs North. The last elected member was John Richardson, who won the second by-election during 1862 in the City of Dunedin electorate. Richardson resigned on 12 September 1862, so a writ was issued to elect a new member for the City of Dunedin electorate. This caused considerable confusion, as it was assumed that the electorate had ceased to exist, and the new Suburb electorates were to be established. Nevertheless, the returning officer went ahead as per the instructions given by Governor George Grey in the writ.

Following this discussion in the media, the election was not taken seriously. The nomination meeting in November 1862 was attended by "a selected audience of three electors, five boys, half-a-dozen diggers out of luck, one policeman and two reporters." Upon calling for nominations, the three electors had "an earnest discussion" and eventually resolved to put forward James Paterson, who was duly declared elected. Paterson was not present at the meeting, and from the media reporting, it would not appear that he was aware that he was going to be nominated.

Paterson's election to the City of Dunedin electorate was upheld, and being the 'latest elected member', his seat was transferred to the Dunedin and Suburbs South electorate.

A second member was elected to the Dunedin and Suburbs South electorate in April 1863 – William Reynolds. Both members served until the end of the term of the 3rd Parliament in January 1866.

All this happened during the time of the Otago gold rush, which led to a significant increase in Otago's population. Changes to electorates reflected this situation. During this time, the Goldfields and later Gold Field Towns electorates were established.

The electorate was abolished in 1866. At that time, the City of Dunedin electorate was re-established. The Dunedin electorates of Caversham, Port Chalmers and Roslyn were all first established in 1866. The vast majority of Dunedin and Suburbs South went to the Caversham electorate.

=== Members of parliament ===
The electorate was represented by two members of parliament:

Election	Winners	
1862 by-election	James Paterson (City of Dunedin incumbent)	
1863 supplementary election	James Paterson (City of Dunedin incumbent)	William Reynolds

== Election results ==
Only two elections were contested during the existence of the Dunedin and Suburbs South electorate.

=== 1863 by-election ===
1863 Dunedin and Suburbs South by-election
Party	Candidate	Votes	%	±%
Independent	James Paterson	105	59.32	
Independent	Julius Vogel	72	40.68	
Turnout		177		
Majority		33	18.64	

=== 1863 supplementary election ===
1863 Dunedin and Suburbs South
Party	Candidate	Votes	%	±%
Independent	William Reynolds	77	64.7	
Independent	Julius Vogel	31	26.1	
Independent	William Cutten	11	9.2	
Turnout		119		
Majority		46		
