= City of Dunedin (New Zealand electorate) =

City of Dunedin, during the first two parliaments called Town of Dunedin, was a parliamentary electorate in Dunedin in Otago, New Zealand. It was one of the original electorates created in 1853 and existed, with two breaks, until 1905. The first break, from 1862 to 1866, was caused by an influx of people through the Otago gold rush, when many new electorates were formed in Otago. The second break occurred from 1881 to 1890. It was the only New Zealand electorate that was created as a single-member, two-member and three member electorate.

== Population centres ==
In December 1887, the House of Representatives voted to reduce its membership from general electorates from 91 to 70. The 1890 electoral redistribution used the same 1886 census data used for the 1887 electoral redistribution. In addition, three-member electorates were introduced in the four main centres. This resulted in a major restructuring of electorates, and Dunedin was one of eight electorates to be re-created for the 1890 election.

== History ==
From 1853 to 1860, the electorate was known as the Town of Dunedin. From 1860 to 1905, it was the City of Dunedin.

James Macandrew was the first elected member. He resigned on 2 November 1858 and was re-elected in a 14 January 1859 by-election.

Elections for the first two-member electorate were held on 24 December 1860. Three people contested the poll, with Thomas Dick and Edward McGlashan returned.

In 1863, the electorate was abolished and replaced with Dunedin and Suburbs North and Dunedin and Suburbs South. It was recreated for the 1866 general election.

James Gordon Stuart Grant was a local eccentric and a frequent candidate from 1867 to 1884.

The 1875 election was contested by eight candidates. The three candidates on the anti-centralist ticket, James Macandrew, William Larnach and Robert Stout, were all successful. They beat William Reynolds, James Macassey Henry Fish, James Grant and John Armstrong.

Larnach resigned on 31 May 1878.

The 1893 election was contested by eight candidates, who contested three available positions. William Hutchison and David Pinkerton were incumbents who were successful, William Earnshaw was the third successful candidate (he had represented the Peninsula electorate in the previous Parliament), the previous representative Henry Fish came fourth, Hugh Gourley was fifth, with other unsuccessful candidates being James Gore, Charles Haynes, and David Nicol.

Dunedin was recreated for the 2020 general election as a single-member electorate, as Dunedin no longer has a population large enough to support two electorates. The electorate, however, does not include South Dunedin, as that is now part of a recreated Taieri electorate.

== Members of Parliament ==
The multi-member electorate was represented by 23 Members of Parliament:

=== Single-member electorate ===
From 1853 to 1860, Town of Dunedin was a single-member electorate.

| Election | Winner |
|---|---|
| 1853 election | James Macandrew |
| 1855 election | James Macandrew |
| 1859 by-election | James Macandrew |

=== Two-member electorate ===
From 1860 to 1863, and 1866 to 1875 City of Dunedin was a two-member electorate. Under the Representation Act 1862 the City of Dunedin electorate was abolished, with two new electorates, Dunedin and Suburbs North and Dunedin and Suburbs South replacing it, with elections being held on 28 March to 6 April 1863 respectively. All electorates before and after changes returned two members, with each of the previous incumbents in City of Dunedin being assigned an incumbency in one of the Dunedin Suburbs electorates, although Thomas Dick resigned before taking up his entitlement in Dunedin and Suburbs North, forcing the 1863 by-election.

| Election | Winners | |
|---|---|---|
| 1860 election | Thomas Dick | Edward McGlashan |
| 1st 1862 by-election | Thomas Dick | Edward McGlashan |
| 2nd 1862 by-election | Thomas Dick | John Richardson |
| 3rd 1862 by-election | Thomas Dick | James Paterson |
Electorate abolished 1862 see Dunedin and Suburbs North and Dunedin and Suburbs South)
| 1866 election | William Reynolds | James Paterson |
| 1867 by-election | William Reynolds | James Paterson |
| 1869 by-election | William Reynolds | Thomas Birch |
| 1871 election | William Reynolds | John Bathgate |
| 1874 by-election | William Reynolds | Nathaniel Wales |

=== Three-member electorate ===
From 1875 to 1881, and 1890 to 1905 City of Dunedin was a three-member electorate.

Key:

Independent Liberal Conservative Liberal–Labour Independent Liberal

| Election | Winners | | |
|---|---|---|---|
| 1875 election | James Macandrew | William Larnach | Robert Stout |
| 1878 by-election | James Macandrew | Richard Oliver | Robert Stout |
| 1879 by-election | James Macandrew | Richard Oliver | William Stewart |
| 1879 election | Thomas Dick | Richard Oliver | William Stewart |
(Electorate abolished 1881–1890, see Dunedin Central, Dunedin East and Dunedin West)
| 1890 election | William Hutchison | David Pinkerton | Henry Fish |
| 1893 election | William Hutchison | David Pinkerton | William Earnshaw |
| 1896 election | Scobie Mackenzie | John A. Millar | Henry Fish |
| 1897 by-election | Scobie Mackenzie | John A. Millar | Alexander Sligo |
| 1899 election | James Arnold | John A. Millar | Alfred Barclay |
| 1902 election | James Arnold | John A. Millar | Harry Bedford |
(Electorate abolished 1905, see Dunedin Central, Dunedin North and Dunedin South)

== Election results ==
=== 1899 election ===
1899 general election: Dunedin
| Party | Candidate | Votes | % | ±% |
|---|---|---|---|---|
| Liberal–Labour | John A. Millar | 9,045 | 61.70 | +14.78 |
| Liberal–Labour | James Arnold | 8,290 | 56.55 | |
| Liberal | Alfred Richard Barclay | 7,363 | 50.23 | |
| Conservative | Scobie Mackenzie | 6,726 | 45.88 | −12.96 |
| Conservative | Alexander Sligo | 6,415 | 43.76 | |
| Conservative | Charles Haynes | 4,919 | 33.55 | |
| Liberal | Charles Robert Chapman | 1,222 | 8.34 | |
| Majority | | 637 | 4.35 | +1.50 |
| Turnout | | 14,660 | 72.99 | +1.99 |
| Registered electors | | 20,084 | | |

=== 1897 by-election ===
1897 City of Dunedin by-election
| Party | Candidate | Votes | % | ±% |
|---|---|---|---|---|
| Conservative | Alexander Sligo | 5,045 | 45.29 | |
| Liberal | Hugh Gourley | 4,065 | 36.49 | |
| Independent Liberal | William Hutchison | 2,030 | 18.22 | |
| Informal votes | | 55 | | |
| Majority | | 980 | | |
| Turnout | | 11,140 | 75.59 | |
| Registered electors | | 14,811 | | |

=== 1896 election ===
1896 general election: Dunedin
| Party | Candidate | Votes | % | ±% |
|---|---|---|---|---|
| Conservative | Scobie Mackenzie | 7,821 | 58.84 | |
| Liberal–Labour | John A. Millar | 6,236 | 46.92 | |
| Conservative | Henry Fish | 6,067 | 45.64 | −1.87 |
| Liberal | David Pinkerton | 5,689 | 42.80 | −15.94 |
| Liberal | William Hutchison | 4,983 | 37.49 | −12.57 |
| Conservative | Alexander Campbell Begg | 4,409 | 33.17 | |
| Liberal–Labour | William Earnshaw | 2,421 | 18.21 | −34.41 |
| Conservative | James Gore | 1,299 | 9.77 | −22.57 |
| Independent | Alfred Henry Burton | 274 | 2.06 | |
| Conservative | Murray Aston | 272 | 2.05 | |
| Independent | Frederick Marler Lester | 209 | 1.57 | |
| Independent | David Nicol | 196 | 1.47 | −2.06 |
| Majority | | 378 (Note: Majority is difference between lowest winning poll (Fish - 6,067) and highest losing poll (Pinkerton - 5,689)) | 2.84 | 0.29 |
| Turnout | | 13,292 | 71.01 | 2.94 |
| Registered electors | | 18,719 | | |

Table footnotes:

=== 1893 election ===
1893 general election: Dunedin
| Party | Candidate | Votes | % | ±% |
|---|---|---|---|---|
| Liberal–Labour | David Pinkerton | 6,771 | 58.74 | −4.88 |
| Liberal–Labour | William Earnshaw | 6,066 | 52.62 | |
| Liberal | William Hutchison | 5,771 | 50.06 | −6.10 |
| Conservative | Henry Fish | 5,477 | 47.51 | −10.65 |
| Liberal | Hugh Gourley | 4,081 | 35.40 | |
| Conservative | James Gore | 3,728 | 32.34 | |
| Conservative | Charles Haynes | 2,283 | 19.80 | |
| Independent | David Nicol | 407 | 3.53 | |
| Majority | | 294 | 2.55 | −2.90 |
| Turnout | | 11,528 | 68.07 | +12.79 |
| Registered electors | | 16,936 | | |

=== 1890 election ===
1890 general election: City of Dunedin
| Party | Candidate | Votes | % | ±% |
|---|---|---|---|---|
| Liberal–Labour | David Pinkerton | 3,209 | 63.61 | |
| Liberal | Henry Fish | 2,934 | 58.16 | |
| Liberal | William Hutchison | 2,833 | 56.16 | |
| Conservative | James Allen | 2,485 | 49.26 | |
| Conservative | Richard Henry Leary | 1,838 | 36.43 | |
| Liberal | Alfred Lee Smith | 1,835 | 36.38 | |
| Majority | | 348 | 6.90 | |
| Turnout | | 5,045 | 55.28 | |
| Registered electors | | 9,126 | | |

=== 1875 election ===
1875 general election: Dunedin
| Party | Candidate | Votes | % | ±% |
|---|---|---|---|---|
| Independent | James Macandrew | 891 | 71.22 | |
| Independent | Robert Stout | 865 | 69.14 | |
| Independent | William Larnach | 843 | 67.38 | |
| Independent | William Reynolds | 476 | 38.04 | |
| Independent | James Macassey | 409 | 32.69 | |
| Independent | Henry Fish | 238 | 19.02 | |
| Independent | James Grant | 29 | 2.31 | |
| Turnout | | 1,251 | | |

=== 1879 City of Dunedin by-election ===
1879 City of Dunedin by-election
| Party | Candidate | Votes | % | ±% |
|---|---|---|---|---|
| Independent | William Downie Stewart Sr | 726 | 54.18 | |
| Independent | Charles Reeves | 563 | 42.01 | |
| Independent | James Gordon Stuart Grant | 51 | 3.81 | |
| Turnout | | 1340 | | |
| Majority | | 163 | 12.16 | |

=== 1878 City of Dunedin by-election ===
1878 City of Dunedin by-election
| Party | Candidate | Votes | % | ±% |
|---|---|---|---|---|
| Independent | Richard Oliver | 769 | 53.89 | |
| Independent | Charles Stephen Reeves | 658 | 46.11 | |
| Majority | | 111 | 7.78 | |
| Turnout | | 1427 | | |

=== 1874 City of Dunedin by-election ===
1874 City of Dunedin by-election
| Party | Candidate | Votes | % | ±% |
|---|---|---|---|---|
| Independent | Nathaniel Wales | 629 | 52.03 | |
| Independent | George Elliott Barton | 541 | 44.75 | |
| Independent | James Gordon Stuart Grant | 39 | 3.23 | |
| Turnout | | 1209 | | |
| Majority | | 88 | 7.28 | |

=== 1869 City of Dunedin by-election ===
1869 City of Dunedin by-election
| Party | Candidate | Votes | % | ±% |
|---|---|---|---|---|
| Independent | Thomas Birch | 578 | 76.35 | |
| Independent | James Gordon Stuart Grant | 179 | 23.65 | |
| Turnout | | 757 | | |
| Majority | | 399 | 52.71 | |

=== 1867 City of Dunedin by-election ===
1867 City of Dunedin by-election
| Party | Candidate | Votes | % | ±% |
|---|---|---|---|---|
| Independent | William Reynolds | 333 | 86.49 | |
| Independent | James Gordon Stuart Grant | 52 | 13.51 | |
| Turnout | | 385 | | |
| Majority | | 281 | 72.99 | |

=== May 1862 City of Dunedin by-election ===
May 1862 City of Dunedin by-election
| Party | Candidate | Votes | % | ±% |
|---|---|---|---|---|
| Independent | John Richardson | 45 | 54.88 | |
| Independent | James Paterson | 37 | 45.12 | |
| Turnout | | 82 | | |
| Majority | | 8 | 9.76 | |

=== 1860 election ===
1860 general election: Town of Dunedin
| Party | Candidate | Votes | % | ±% |
|---|---|---|---|---|
| Independent | Thomas Dick | 96 | 44.04 | |
| Independent | Edward McGlashan | 88 | 40.37 | |
| Independent | William John Dyer | 34 | 15.60 | |
| Turnout | | 218 | | |

=== 1859 by-election ===
1859 Town of Dunedin by-election
| Party | Candidate | Votes | % | ±% |
|---|---|---|---|---|
| Independent | James Macandrew | 40 | 93.02 | − |
| Independent | James Gordon Stuart Grant | 3 | 6.98 | − |
| Majority | | 37 | 86.05 | − |
| Total votes | | 43 | - | - |
