= 1863 Dunedin and Suburbs South by-election =

New Zealand by-election

The 1863 Dunedin and Suburbs South by-election was a by-election held on 20 June 1876 in the Dunedin and Suburbs South electorate during the 3rd New Zealand Parliament. It was then a two-member electorate; the other member being William Reynolds.

The by-election was caused by the resignation of the incumbent, James Paterson. He had resigned because of complaints that there were irregularities in his election, although the election had been gazetted as valid. At the nomination meeting the show of hands was Paterson 19 to Vogel 9, but Vogel demanded a poll.

Paterson was re-nominated. He was opposed by Julius Vogel but Paterson was re-elected.

Paterson wrote condemning an unseemly and offensive pamphlet that he had not been aware of, referring to the religion of Vogel (who was a Jew).

== Result ==
The following table gives the election result:

1863 Dunedin and Suburbs South by-election
Party	Candidate	Votes	%	±%
Independent	James Paterson	105	59.32	
Independent	Julius Vogel	72	40.68	
Turnout		177		
Majority		33	18.64	
