= James Paterson (New Zealand politician) =

New Zealand politician

New Zealand Parliament
Years	Term	Electorate	Party
1862–1863	3rd	City of Dunedin	Independent
1863–1866	3rd	Dunedin and Suburbs South	Independent
1866–1869	4th	City of Dunedin	Independent

James Paterson (1807 – 29 July 1886) was a 19th-century Member of Parliament in Otago, New Zealand. He was a cabinet minister, and on the Legislative Council.

Paterson was born in Edinburgh in 1807. He lived in British Guiana for 14 years and by the early 1850s, he had returned to Edinburgh. He met George Ross, one of Dunedin's first settlers, who had come back to Edinburgh to have a ship built for him. Paterson emigrated to Dunedin on that ship, the Clutha, and reached Dunedin on 12 February 1854. He was a merchant in Dunedin and went into partnership with George Hepburn, and together they bought out the business of James Macandrew.

Paterson was first elected onto the Otago Provincial Council for the Town of Dunedin electorate on 2 October 1861 and served for the remainder of the third council, and for all of the fourth council until 10 January 1867. For three separate periods between April 1862 and April 1865, he was a member of the executive council.

When Edward McGlashan resigned from the City of Dunedin parliamentary electorate, he contested the resulting May 1862 by-election, but was beaten by John Richardson. Richardson himself resigned not long after, and Paterson won the resulting by-election unopposed. He represented the City of Dunedin electorate until the following year (1863), when he in turn also resigned. When the Dunedin and Suburbs South electorate was formed in 1863, Paterson defeated Julius Vogel and represented the electorate until 1866. In 1865, he stood for Mayor of Dunedin, but was beaten by William Mason in this inaugural election.

From 1866, he was a member for the City of Dunedin electorate alongside William Reynolds, until he again resigned in 1869. His popularity came to an end when he spoke in favour of the abolition of provincial governments. He did not stand for election again, and on 17 June 1869, he was appointed to the New Zealand Legislative Council by Edward Stafford. He remained a member until 19 August 1884, when he was too ill to remain on the council.

In 1859, Paterson married the widow of Thomas Bain; they had no children. He was ill for five years before he died on 29 July 1886 at his home in Regent Road, Dunedin, and was survived by his wife.

== Notes ==
Political offices
Preceded by Edward Stafford	Postmaster-General; 1866	Succeeded by John Hall
New Zealand Parliament
Preceded by John Richardson	Member of Parliament for City of Dunedin; 1862–1863; 1866–1869; Served alongside: Thomas Dick (1862–1863); William Reynolds (1866–1869)	In abeyance Title next held by William Reynolds himself
In abeyance Title last held by Thomas Dick himself	Member of Parliament for City of Dunedin; 1862–1863; 1866–1869; Served alongside: Thomas Dick (1862–1863); William Reynolds (1866–1869)	Succeeded by Thomas Birch
New constituency	Member of Parliament for Dunedin and Suburbs South; 1863–1866; Served alongside: William Reynolds	Constituency abolished
