= 1862 City of Dunedin by-elections =

Two New Zealand by-elections

The 1862 City of Dunedin by-elections were three by-elections held in the City of Dunedin electorate in Dunedin following three resignations.

The City of Dunedin electorate was one of the original 24 electorates used for the 1st New Zealand Parliament in 1853.

In 1862 it was a two-member electorate in the 3rd New Zealand Parliament. That year, the following by-elections were held.

== March 1862 ==
Thomas Dick had resigned as his business interests meant that he could not travel to Auckland for the current session. Major Richardson was nominated to replace Dick, who then decided to stand again. At a nomination meeting on Tuesday, 18 March, a show of hands gave 15 for Dick and 14 for Richardson; Richardson called for a poll. But later it was found that Richardson had been nominated by Mr Lloyd who was not an elector for the same district and so was not qualified to nominate him. So Dick was re-elected on 18 or 19 March without a poll being held. Apart from the period before his re-election, he was a member for the electorate for the whole of 1862.

== May 1862 ==
Edward McGlashan resigned and on 30 May was replaced by John Richardson. He was opposed by James Paterson. The result of the poll was:

May 1862 City of Dunedin by-election
Party	Candidate	Votes	%	±%
Independent	John Richardson	45	54.88	
Independent	James Paterson	37	45.12	
Turnout		82		
Majority		8	9.76	

== November 1862 ==
John Richardson resigned and on 15 November was replaced by James Paterson. Major Richardson was transferred to the new electorate of Dunedin and Suburbs North, and thought it fair to let the electors of the new electorate have a vote. However, the writ was issued for the abolished electorate of the City of Dunedin, and the two individuals present nominated Paterson, the only nomination. As the last person elected, Paterson was transferred to the new electorate of Dunedin and Suburbs South
