= 1863 Town of New Plymouth by-election =

New Zealand by-election

The 1863 Town of New Plymouth by-election was a by-election held on 9 October in the Town of New Plymouth electorate during the 3rd New Zealand Parliament.

The by-election was caused by the resignation of the incumbent, Isaac Newton Watt.

He was replaced by Henry Hanson Turton.

Turton was the only nomination, so was declared elected unopposed.
