= David Forsyth Main =

New Zealand politician

New Zealand Parliament
Years	Term	Electorate	Party
1867–1870	4th	Port Chalmers	Independent

David Forsyth Main (1831 – 27 July 1880) was a 19th-century member of parliament in Otago, New Zealand.

Main was one of three candidates in the Gold Field Towns electorate in the 1866 election, when he came a close second to James Benn Bradshaw.

Main represented the Port Chalmers electorate from 1867 to 1870, when he retired.

He was a barrister and died in Dunedin aged 48.

New Zealand Parliament
Preceded by Thomas Dick	Member of Parliament for Port Chalmers; 1867–1870	Succeeded by James Macandrew
