= 1878 Port Chalmers by-election =

New Zealand by-election

The 1878 Port Chalmers by-election was a by-election held on 12 April 1878 in the Port Chalmers electorate during the 6th New Zealand Parliament.

The by-election was caused by the resignation of the incumbent MP William Reynolds.

The by-election was won by James Green.

he was opposed by the ex-Mayor Mr Henry Dench.

== Results ==
The following table gives the election result (possibly missing one booth, but no later result has been found):

1878 Port Chalmers by-election
Party	Candidate	Votes	%	±%
Independent	James Green	269	60.04	
Independent	Henry Dench	179	39.96	
Majority		90	20.09	
Turnout		448		
