= 1867 City of Dunedin by-election =

New Zealand by-election

The 1867 City of Dunedin by-election was a by-election held on 19 January 1867 in the City of Dunedin electorate in Dunedin during the 4th New Zealand Parliament.

The by-election was caused by the resignation of the incumbent, William Reynolds. In 1867, there was great political turmoil in Otago over the New Zealand Wars fought in the North Island and its associated expenditure, and calls for separation of the South Island from the North Island. At a public meeting called by the Mayor of Dunedin, William Mason, Reynolds and James Paterson, who represented the City of Dunedin, both agreed that they would resign and then see whether they still had public support. Reynolds went ahead with his resignation but Paterson did not.

Reynolds stood for re-election, and was confirmed by a large majority.

He was opposed by James Gordon Stuart Grant, a local eccentric and frequent candidate who was then a member of the Otago Provincial Council.

== Results ==
1867 City of Dunedin by-election
Party	Candidate	Votes	%	±%
Independent	William Reynolds	333	86.49	
Independent	James Gordon Stuart Grant	52	13.51	
Turnout		385		
Majority		281	72.99	
