= 1863 Hampden by-election =

New Zealand by-election

The 1863 Hampden by-election was a by-election held on 2 July 1863 in the Hampden electorate during the 3rd New Zealand Parliament.

The by-election was caused by the resignation of the incumbent, John Richard Jones.

Frederick Wayne was declared elected unopposed, as he was the only candidate nominated.
