= 1862 Hampden by-election =

New Zealand by-election

The 1862 Hampden by-election was a by-election held on 14 June 1862 in the Hampden electorate during the 3rd New Zealand Parliament.

The by-election was caused by the resignation of the incumbent, Thomas Fraser, on 30 April 1862. He had been vacated for absence.

James Williamson was declared elected unopposed, as he was the only candidate nominated. Julius Vogel was also nominated, but declined.
