= 1869 City of Dunedin by-election =

New Zealand by-election

The 1869 City of Dunedin by-election was a by-election held on 5 March 1869 in the City of Dunedin electorate in Dunedin during the 4th New Zealand Parliament.

The by-election was caused by the resignation of the incumbent, James Paterson.

The winner was Thomas Birch. He was opposed by James Gordon Stuart Grant, a local eccentric and frequent candidate.

== Results ==
1869 City of Dunedin by-election
Party	Candidate	Votes	%	±%
Independent	Thomas Birch	578	76.35	
Independent	James Gordon Stuart Grant	179	23.65	
Turnout		757		
Majority		399	52.71	
