= 1887 Port Chalmers by-election =

New Zealand by-election

The 1887 Port Chalmers by-election was a by-election held on 6 April 1887 in the Port Chalmers electorate during the 9th New Zealand Parliament.

The by-election was caused by the death on 11 February of the incumbent MP James Macandrew.

The by-election was won by James Mills. As he was the only candidate nominated, he was declared duly elected.
