= Archie Campbell (politician) =

New Zealand politician

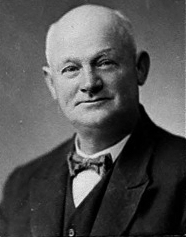
Campbell in 1935

Archibald Campbell (2 January 1874 – 1 September 1955) was a New Zealand politician of the Labour Party and Secretary of the Port Chalmers Waterside Workers Union.

== Political career ==
New Zealand Parliament
Years	Term	Electorate	Party
1935–1938	25th	Chalmers	Labour

Norman Hartley Campbell, the brother of Archibald Campbell, had unsuccessfully contested the Chalmers electorate in the 1928 and 1931 elections. His brother had already won the nomination as the Labour candidate for the 1935 election against Michael Connelly, when he died in February 1935 following an operation. The Labour Party hierarchy wanted to make Connolly their candidate, but there was resentment and a new ballot was held, which was won by Archibald Campbell. He was elected for the Chalmers electorate with the swing to Labour in the 1935 election, but retired in 1938.

He served on the Legislative Council from 1939 to 1946 and from 1947 to 1950, when the upper house was abolished.

== Notes ==
New Zealand Parliament
Preceded by Alfred Ansell	Member of Parliament for Chalmers; 1935–1938	Constituency abolished
