= New Zealand supplementary elections =

Parliamentary elections held during the colonial period

The New Zealand Constitution Act 1852 authorised the General Assembly to establish new electoral districts and to alter the boundaries of, or abolish, existing districts whenever this was deemed necessary. The rapid growth of New Zealand's European population in the early years of representative government (particularly in Otago) meant changes to electoral districts were implemented frequently, both at general elections, and on four occasions as supplementary elections within the lifetime of a parliament.

== 1859 supplementary election ==
The Electoral Districts Act 1858 established four new electorates; Marsden and Wairarapa in the North Island, and Cheviot and Wallace in the South Island. Elections were held from 7 November to 18 December 1859 during the term of the 2nd New Zealand Parliament and required redrawing of the electoral boundaries of Bay of Islands, Northern Division, Wairarapa and Hawke's Bay (renamed as County of Hawke), Wairau, Christchurch Country and Dunedin Country electorates.

=== Results ===
==== Wairarapa ====
The Wairarapa election was won unopposed by Charles Carter on 7 November 1859.

==== Marsden ====
The Marsden election was won by James Farmer on 29 November 1859.

On nomination day (21 November) James Farmer and John Munro were nominated, and after a show of hands in favour of Farmer, Munro demanded a poll. James Farmer was subsequently elected the following week, although voting figures are currently unknown.

==== Wallace ====
The Wallace election was won unopposed by Dillon Bell on 30 November 1859.

==== Cheviot ====
The Cheviot election was won unopposed by Edward Jollie on 18 December 1859.

== 1863 supplementary election ==
The Representation Act 1862 added two new electorates and four additional MPs to Otago Province in the South of the South Island. Gold Fields electorate was overlaid over the entire province, and the electorates of Bruce and City of Dunedin were substantially redrawn, with City of Dunedin disappearing and two new electorates, Dunedin and Suburbs North and Dunedin and Suburbs South replacing it. Elections were held from 28 March to 14 April 1863. All electorates before and after changes returned two members, with each of the previous incumbents in City of Dunedin being assigned an incumbency in one of the Dunedin Suburbs electorates although Thomas Dick resigned before taking up his entitlement in Dunedin and Suburbs North.

=== Results ===
==== Dunedin and Suburbs North ====
The Dunedin and Suburbs North election was won unopposed by John Richardson on 28 March 1863.

==== Dunedin and Suburbs South ====
The Dunedin and Suburbs South election was won by William Reynolds on 6 April 1863.

On nomination day (2 April) Reynolds, William Cutten and Julius Vogel were nominated, and after a show of hands in favour of Reynolds, Cutten and Vogel demanded a poll. Reynolds was subsequently elected the following week.

1863 Dunedin and Suburbs South
Party	Candidate	Votes	%	±%
Independent	William Reynolds	77	64.7	
Independent	Julius Vogel	31	26.1	
Independent	William Cutten	11	9.2	
Turnout		119		
Majority		46		

==== Gold Fields ====
The Gold Fields election returned two members, and was won unopposed by William Baldwin and George Brodie on 14 April 1863.

== 1868 supplementary election ==
The Westland Representation Act 1867 introduced changes to the Waimea and Westland electorates. Their areas were reassigned and four electorates formed. Waimea lost some area, but continued to exist. Westland was abolished in 1867. A new electorate Westland Boroughs (comprising the towns of Greymouth and Hokitika) was established, and the Act stipulated that the sitting Westland member, William Sefton Moorhouse, was transferred to it. Other new electorates, Westland North and Westland South held elections from 3–9 April 1868.

=== Results ===
==== Westland South ====
The Westland South election was won by Edmund Barff on 6 April 1868.

On nomination day (30 March) Barff and Charles Button were nominated, and after a show of hands in favour of Button, a poll was demanded. Edmund Barff was subsequently elected the following week.

1868 Westland South election
Party	Candidate	Votes	%	±%
Independent	Edmund Barff	355	51.7	
Independent	Charles Button	332	48.3	
Turnout		687		
Majority		23		

==== Westland North ====
The Westland North election was won by Timothy Gallagher on 9 April 1868.

On nomination day (4 April) Gallagher, George Donne, and George Horne were nominated, and after a show of hands in favour of Horne, Donne demanded a poll. Timothy Gallagher was subsequently elected the following week.

1868 Westland North election
Party	Candidate	Votes	%	±%
Independent	Timothy Gallagher	597	67.0	
Independent	George Horne	270	30.3	
Independent	George Donne	24	2.7	
Turnout		891		
Majority		327		

== 1868 Māori election ==
The Maori Representation Act 1867 established four electorates to represent the indigenous Māori population. The European (or General) electorates at the time only enfranchised adult males who were the owners of freehold or leasehold land, and as Māori land was generally communally owned under customary title this put them outside the definitions of the Constitution Act, and unable to register to vote. Elections to the four electorates; Eastern Maori, Northern Maori, Southern Maori and Western Maori were held on or around 15 April 1868.
