= James Mills (ship owner) =

New Zealand businessman (1847–1936)

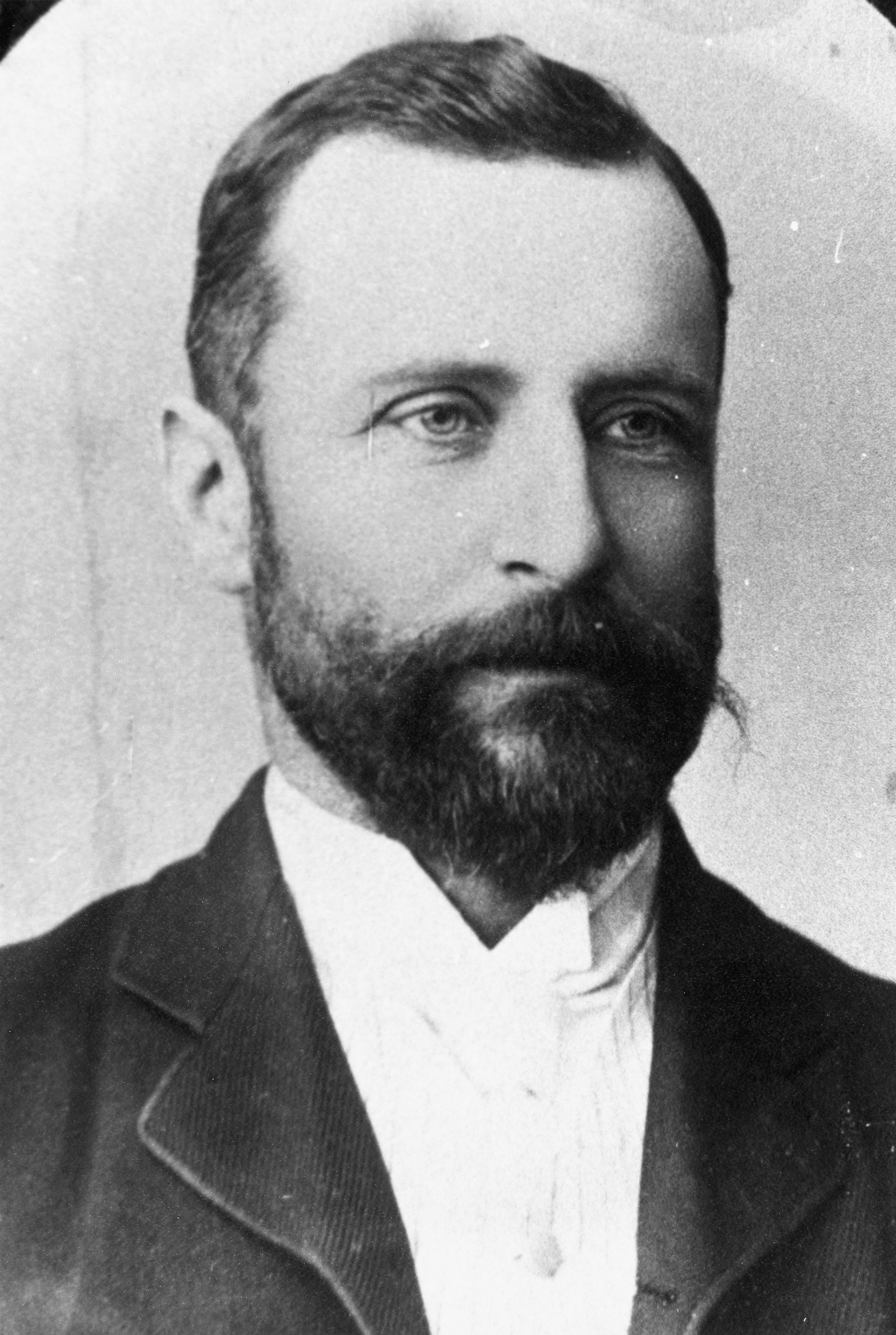
James Mills, c. 1887

Sir James Mills KCMG (30 July 1847 – 23 January 1936) was a New Zealand businessman and politician. He founded the Union Steam Ship Company in Dunedin in 1875.

== Biography ==
New Zealand Parliament
Years	Term	Electorate	Party
1887	9th	Port Chalmers	Independent
1887–1890	10th	Port Chalmers	Independent
1890–1893	11th	Port Chalmers	Independent

Mills was born in Wellington and raised in Dunedin. He worked for Johnny Jones, starting as a shop assistant and working his way up to managing Jones' Harbour Steam Company. After Jones' death in 1869 he became the leading trustee of his estate. Between 1869 and 1871 he built up a shareholding in the Harbour Steam Company until he was able to control the company. He floated the Union Steam Ship Company of New Zealand in 1875 with backing from Scottish shipbuilder Peter Denny in return for orders for his Dumbarton shipyard. The Union Company (as it was known) became a major shipping line, with a near-monopoly on trans-Tasman shipping, and was referred to as the "Southern Octopus". By 1914 it had 75 ships. It was the biggest shipping line in the southern hemisphere and New Zealand's largest private-sector employer. Mills sold the Union Company to P&O in 1917.

He represented Waikouaiti on the Otago Provincial Council in 1870, and again from 1873 to 1876. Later, he represented the Port Chalmers electorate in Parliament from a by-election in 1887 to 1893, when he retired.

He was knighted in 1907, and appointed Knight Commander of the Order of St Michael and St George in 1909. It was said in a tribute to Mills that these distinctions made him the first native-born, non-indigenous New Zealander to be so honoured.

He died in London on 23 January 1936, aged 88, having been a UK resident since 1907. He is buried in Putney Vale Cemetery, south west London. Mount Mills in Antarctica is named after him.

New Zealand Parliament
Preceded by James Macandrew	Member of Parliament for Port Chalmers; 1887–1893	Succeeded by John A. Millar
