= James Green (New Zealand politician) =

New Zealand politician

New Zealand Parliament
Years	Term	Electorate	Party
1878–1879	6th	Port Chalmers	Independent
1881–1884	8th	Waikouaiti	Independent
1893–1896	12th	Waikouaiti	Independent

James Green (1836–1905) was a 19th-century independent Member of Parliament in Otago, New Zealand.

He represented the Port Chalmers electorate from 1878 to 1879, when he was defeated. He then represented the Waikouaiti electorate from 1881 to 1884, when he was defeated, and from 1893 to 1896, when he was again defeated.

New Zealand Parliament
Preceded by William Reynolds	Member of Parliament for Port Chalmers; 1878–1879	Succeeded by James Macandrew
