= Thomas Fraser (New Zealand politician) =

New Zealand politician

New Zealand Parliament
Years	Term	Electorate	Party
1861–1862	3rd	Hampden	Independent

Thomas Fraser (27 December 1807 – 24 June 1891) was a 19th-century Member of Parliament in Otago, New Zealand.

Fraser was born in Inverness-shire; his father was Captain Thomas Fraser. He joined the East India Company at age 16 as a member of the 7th Bengal Cavalry. He held the rank of captain at his retirement in 1842 and went to live in France for some time. He came to Wellington in New Zealand on the Oliver Lang on 18 September 1858.

In Otago, Fraser settled on a sheep station in the Shag Valley; located off what is now State Highway 85 roughly half-way between Dunback and Morrisons.

Fraser represented the Hampden electorate from 1861 to 1862, when he was vacated for absence. He was appointed onto the executive committee of the Otago Provincial Council in 1868 and was deputy-superintendent under James Macandrew. He was appointed to the Legislative Council in 1870, which he held until he died on 24 June 1891.

His son, John F. M. Fraser, married a daughter of Richard Davies Ireland Q.C. of Melbourne.
