= Henry Hanson Turton =

New Zealand politician (1818–1887)

New Zealand Parliament
Years	Term	Electorate	Party
1863–1864	3rd	Town of New Plymouth	Independent

Henry Hanson Turton (1818–1887) was a 19th-century Member of Parliament in Taranaki, New Zealand.

He represented the Town of New Plymouth electorate from 1863 to 1864, when he resigned.

New Zealand Parliament
Preceded by Isaac Newton Watt	Member of Parliament for Town of New Plymouth; 1863–1864	Succeeded by Charles Brown
