= Frederick Wayne =

New Zealand politician (1834–1901)

New Zealand Parliament
Years	Term	Electorate	Party
1863–1866	3rd	Hampden	Independent

Frederick Wayne (1834–1901) was a 19th-century Member of Parliament in Otago, New Zealand.

He represented the Hampden electorate from 1863 to 1866, when he retired.

Wayne married in 1864 and had four sons.
