= 1874 City of Dunedin by-election =

New Zealand by-election

A by-election was held on 23 April 1874 in the City of Dunedin electorate in Dunedin during the 5th New Zealand Parliament.

The by-election was caused by the resignation of the incumbent, John Bathgate to when he resigned to take up the appointments of Dunedin resident magistrate and Otago district judge.

The winner of the by-election was Nathaniel Wales.

Wales was opposed by George Elliott Barton and James Gordon Stuart Grant.

Grant was a local eccentric and frequent candidate.

== Results ==
1874 City of Dunedin by-election
Party	Candidate	Votes	%	±%
Independent	Nathaniel Wales	629	52.03	
Independent	George Elliott Barton	541	44.75	
Independent	James Gordon Stuart Grant	39	3.23	
Turnout		1209		
Majority		88	7.28	
