= 1862 Town of New Plymouth by-election =

New Zealand by-election

The 1862 Town of New Plymouth by-election was a by-election held on 5 May in the Town of New Plymouth electorate during the 3rd New Zealand Parliament.

The by-election was caused by the resignation of the incumbent, William Richmond.

He was replaced by Isaac Newton Watt.

Watt was the only nomination, so was declared elected unopposed.
