= 1867 Port Chalmers by-election =

New Zealand by-election

The 1867 Port Chalmers by-election was a by-election held on 15 June 1867 in the Port Chalmers electorate during the 4th New Zealand Parliament.

The by-election was caused by the death on 11 February of the incumbent MP Thomas Dick. The by-election was won by David Forsyth Main.

== Results ==
The following table gives the election result, which was contested by five candidates, although Main and Captain Malcolm were the only serious contenders:

1867 Port Chalmers by-election
| Party | Candidate | Votes | % | ±% |
|---|---|---|---|---|
| Independent | David Forsyth Main | 92 | 46.94 | |
| Independent | Captain James Malcolm | 81 | 41.33 | |
| Independent | Hugh McDermid | 22 | 11.22 | |
| Independent | James McIndoe | 1 | 0.51 | |
| Independent | John Graham | 0 | 0 | |
| Majority | | 11 | 5.61 | |
| Turnout | | 196 | | |
