= John Richard Jones =

New Zealand politician

New Zealand Parliament
Years	Term	Electorate	Party
1862–1863	3rd	Hampden	Independent

John Richard Jones (died 4 May 1911) was a 19th-century Member of Parliament in Otago, New Zealand.

Jones was the eldest son of Johnny Jones, a ship owner from Sydney and one of the earliest pioneers in Otago, where he bought a whaling station near Waikouaiti in 1838. On 23 October 1855, Jones Jr. married Mary Orbell, the fourth daughter of John Orbell of Hawkesbury.

Jones represented the Hampden electorate from 1862 to 1863, when he resigned. He died on 4 May 1911.
