= Alfred Ansell =

New Zealand politician

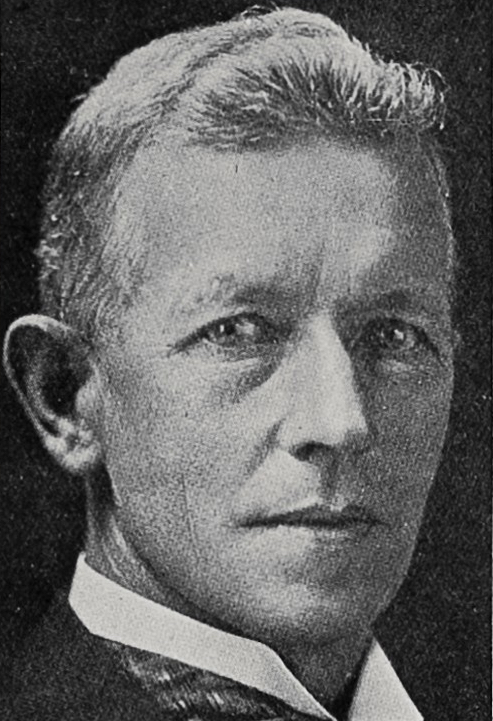
Alfred Ansell

Alfred Edward Ansell (1876 – 16 February 1941) was a Reform Party Member of Parliament in New Zealand.

New Zealand Parliament
Years	Term	Electorate	Party
1928–1931	23rd	Chalmers	Reform
1931–1935	24th	Chalmers	Reform

Ansell was born in 1876 in Dunedin. He was elected to the Chalmers electorate in the 1928 general election, but was defeated in 1935.

In 1935, he was awarded the King George V Silver Jubilee Medal. He died unexpectedly on 16 February 1941.

New Zealand Parliament
Preceded by James Dickson	Member of Parliament for Chalmers; 1928–1935	Succeeded by Archie Campbell
