= Dunedin and Suburbs North =

Dunedin and Suburbs North was a parliamentary electorate in the city of Dunedin in Otago, New Zealand from 1863 to 1866. It was a multi-member electorate.

== History ==
During the second session (from 7 July to 15 September 1862) of the 3rd Parliament, the Representation Act, 1862 was passed. The Act stipulated that the two-member City of Dunedin electorate was to be abolished in 1863 and replaced with Dunedin and Suburbs North and Dunedin and Suburbs South. Clause 9 of the Act read:

The existing two members of the City of Dunedin shall thenceforth, as long as they retain their seats, be respectively members of the district of Dunedin and suburbs North and Dunedin and suburbs South, in manner following, that is to say, the earliest elected member shall be a member for the district of Dunedin and suburbs North, and the last elected member shall be a member for the district of Dunedin and suburbs South.

The first elected member was Thomas Dick, but he resigned from the City of Dunedin electorate during 1863. John Richardson was elected on 20 April 1863. Future Premier Julius Vogel was elected separately in the 1863 by-election election some months later on 29 September 1863. Both members served until Parliament was dissolved on 27 January 1866.

All this happened during the time of the Otago gold rush, which led to a significant increase in Otago's population. Changes to electorates reflected this situation. During this time, the Goldfields and later Goldfields Towns electorates were established.

The electorate was abolished in 1866. At that time, the City of Dunedin electorate was re-established. The Dunedin electorates of Caversham, Port Chalmers and Roslyn were all first established in 1866.

== Members ==
The electorate was represented by two members of parliament:

Election	Winners	
1863 supplementary election	John Richardson (Independent)	(vacant)
1863 by-election	John Richardson (Independent)	Julius Vogel (Independent)
