= 1882–1883 Whitaker ministry =

New Zealand government led by Frederick Whitaker

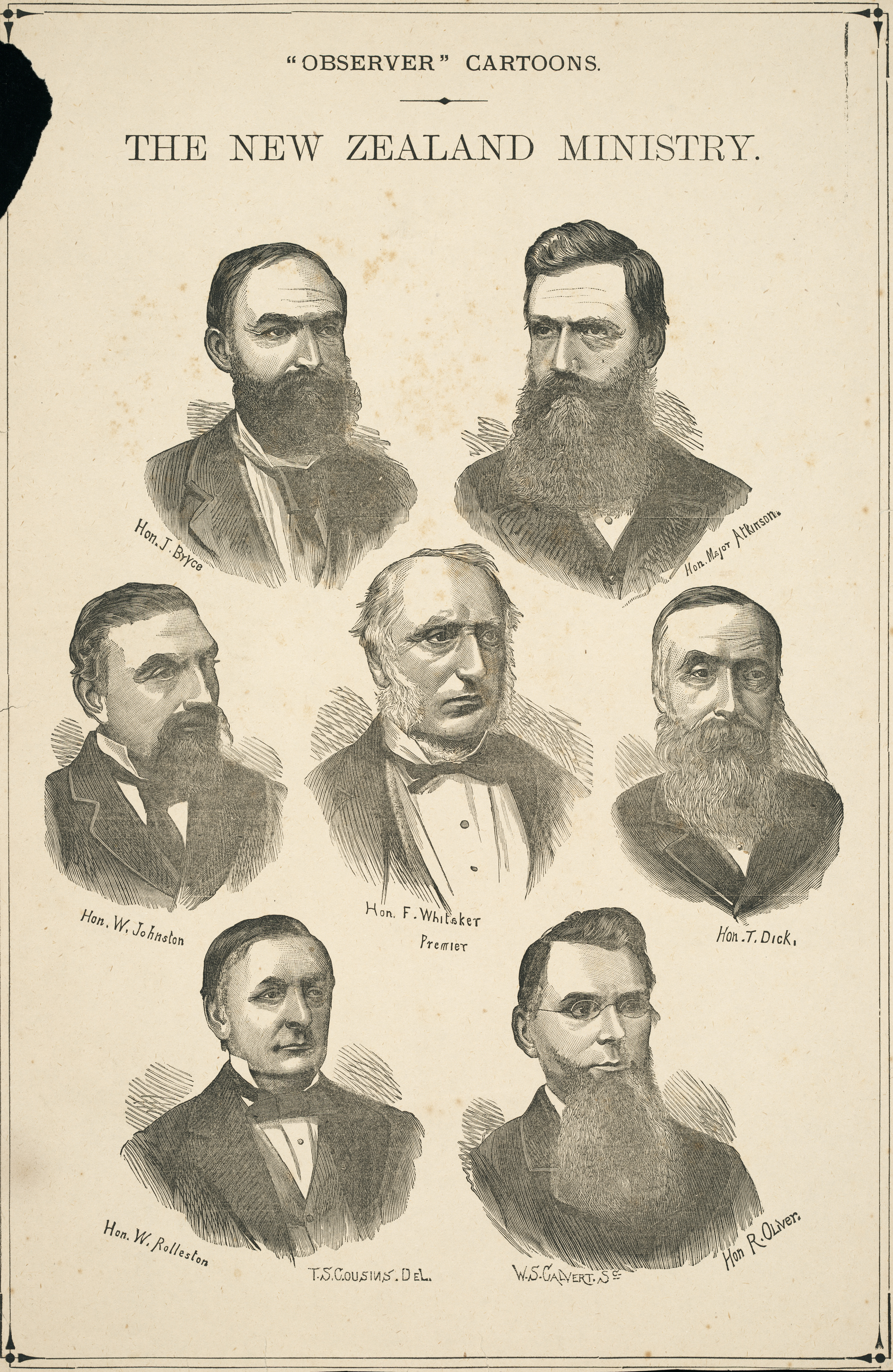
The Whitaker ministry in July 1882 (Connolly not appointed yet)

The Whitaker ministry was formed in 1882 as the government of New Zealand. It was led by Frederick Whitaker and lasted for 17 months, from 21 April 1882 to 25 September 1883. The Whitaker ministry succeeded the Hall ministry upon John Hall's resignation.

== Background ==
John Hall resigned as premier due to health issues and a Cabinet conflict with Native Minister John Bryce, which led Governor Gordon to attempt to call Sir George Grey to form a ministry. Hall reminded the governor that his following held a majority in the House of Representatives and nominated Frederick Whitaker to replace him. Whitaker had been the Hall government's representative in the Legislative Council, renowned as "a Triton among minnows" in that house. Harry Atkinson represented Whitaker in the lower house.

The ministry succeeded Hall's retrenching government, but as a budget surplus had been achieved, they felt able to reduce the property tax by half and raise a 3-million-pound loan for public works. Atkinson introduced a bill to establish a contributory social security scheme in 1882, but this was well ahead of contemporary opinion, and his second attempt in 1883 was greeted with "ribald laughter". Similarly, William Rolleston's attempt to create a perpetual Crown lease option for land ownership was amended beyond recognition by the Legislative Council.

On 15 September 1882 the ministry passed the North Island Main Trunk Railway Loan Act, to expedite construction of the North Island Main Trunk south of Te Awamutu by authorising the overseas borrowing of a million pounds for the work.

Whitaker had only intended to serve for a single session of Parliament, and having found the premiership tiresome, he returned to his legal practice. He was succeeded by his close colleague Harry Atkinson.

== Ministers ==
The following members served in the Whitaker ministry:

Name	Portrait	Office	Term
Frederick Whitaker, MLC		Premier	21 April 1882 – 25 September 1883
Frederick Whitaker, MLC		Attorney-General	8 October 1879 – 25 September 1883
Harry Atkinson		Colonial Treasurer	8 October 1879 – 16 August 1884
Harry Atkinson		Commissioner of Stamp Duties	29 October 1879 – 16 August 1884
Harry Atkinson		Commissioner of Customs	21 April 1882 – 16 August 1884
William Rolleston		Minister of Lands and Immigration	8 October 1879 – 16 August 1884
William Rolleston		Minister of Mines	15 December 1880 – 16 August 1884
John Bryce		Minister of Native Affairs	19 October 1881 – 16 August 1884
Thomas Dick		Colonial Secretary	5 March 1880 – 16 August 1884
Thomas Dick		Minister of Education	15 December 1880 – 16 August 1884
Thomas Dick		Minister of Justice	23 April 1881 – 11 October 1882
Thomas Dick		Postmaster-General	11 October 1882 – 25 September 1883
Thomas Dick		Electric Telegraph Commissioner	11 October 1882 – 25 September 1883
Walter Johnston		Postmaster-General	9 March 1881 – 11 October 1882
Walter Johnston		Commissioner of Telegraphs	9 March 1881 – 11 October 1882
Walter Johnston		Minister for Public Works	21 April 1882 – 23 November 1883
Richard Oliver, MLC		Member of Executive Council	18 May 1882 – 25 September 1883
Edward Conolly		Minister of Justice	11 October 1882 – 16 August 1884

== See also ==
- List of New Zealand governments
