= 1866 Port Chalmers by-election =

New Zealand by-election

The 1866 Port Chalmers by-election was a by-election held on 15 December 1866 during the 4th New Zealand Parliament in the Otago electorate of Port Chalmers.

The by-election was caused by the resignation of the incumbent MP Thomas Dick.

Dick had spoken in favour of separation of the two islands, as he could not prevent "our money being spent on absurd and unnecessary Maori difficulties" in the North Island.

He was renominated. As there were no other candidates, he was declared elected unopposed.
