= 1863 Dunedin and Suburbs North by-election =

New Zealand by-election

The Dunedin and Suburbs North by-election 1863 was a by-election held on 3 September 1863 in the Dunedin and Suburbs North electorate during the 3rd New Zealand Parliament.

The by-election was caused by the resignation of incumbent MP Thomas Dick.

The election was won by Julius Vogel. As no other candidate was proposed, he was duly declared elected unopposed.
