= Rachel Reynolds =

New Zealand social worker and community leader

- Born: Rachel Selina Pinkerton; 19 December 1838; South Australia, Australia
- Died: 21 August 1928 (aged 89); Dunedin, New Zealand
- Occupation: Social worker
- Spouse: William Hunter Reynolds (m. 1856; died in 1899)

Rachel Selina Reynolds (née Pinkerton, 19 December 1838 – 21 August 1928) was a New Zealand social worker and community leader.

== Early life ==
Reynolds was born in South Australia, Australia in 1838, the eldest of six children of William and Eleanor Pinkerton. She grew up in the Australian outback, acquiring skills such as rounding up wild cattle. Life was rough and dangerous, however, and in 1855 the family moved to New Zealand. They established a sheep farm in Tapanui, in the southern province of Otago, and lived in Dunedin.

== Adult life ==
At the age of 17, in 1856, Reynolds married local merchant and politician William Reynolds. Shortly after, the couple went to England to recruit more settlers for Otago. On their return, they purchased a large hillside house in Dunedin, Montecillo and lived there for the next 40 years, raising a family of nine children, four daughters and three sons.

Reynolds was active in a wide range of social justice causes. In the 1860s she was one of a group of Dunedin residents who lobbied for the establishment of a girls' secondary school, resulting in the opening of Otago Girls' High School in 1871. She was also active in encouraging the University of Otago to admit women students, a goal which was also realised in 1871.

Reynolds also worked on projects providing welfare to poor and needy people. In the 1870s Reynolds worked with Presbyterian minister Rutherford Waddell to provide food, clothes and other welfare services to poor women and children in Dunedin. She also set up a clothing club and ran sewing lessons so that mothers could learn to make affordable clothes for their families.

Reynolds devoted a large amount of time to addressing the needs of children, leading to the opening of New Zealand's first free kindergarten in 1889. She later became the president of the Dunedin Free Kindergarten Association, and oversaw the establishment of a further seven kindergartens in the city.

In the 1880s and early 1890s, Reynolds was active in the women's suffrage movement and in 1892 became vice-president of an independent women's franchise league formed in Dunedin that year.

Reynolds' husband died in 1899, after which Reynolds travelled to England and Europe and wrote her memoirs, published in 1929 as Pioneering in Australia and New Zealand.

Reynolds died in Dunedin in 1928.

In September 2026 it was announced that a new street in the Dunedin suburb of Calton Hill would be named Rachel Reynolds Place in Reynolds' honour.
