= George Bell (editor) =

New Zealand newspaper proprietor and editor

George Bell (9 January 1809 – 4 February 1899) was a New Zealand newspaper proprietor and editor. He was born in Kingston upon Hull, Yorkshire, England on 9 January 1809. Edward McGlashan was his son-in-law.
