= Hampden (New Zealand electorate) =

Hampden was a parliamentary electorate in the Otago region of New Zealand, from 1861 to 1870. The electorate was centred on the town of Hampden.

== History ==
The electorate was formed for the 1860–1861 general election. Its first representative was Thomas Fraser, who was vacated for absence in 1862. John Richard Jones succeeded him in an 1862 by-election. He resigned the following year. Jones was succeeded by Frederick Wayne in an 1863 by-election. Wayne retired at the end of the term.

The 1866 general election was won by Charles Edward Haughton. He served until the end of the term in 1870, when the Hampden electorate was abolished. Haughton successfully contested the Wakatipu electorate in the 1871 general election.

== Members of Parliament ==
Hampden was represented by four Members of Parliament:

Key

Independent

Election	Winner
1861 election	Thomas Fraser
1862 by-election	John Richard Jones
1863 by-election	Frederick Wayne
1866 election	Charles Edward Haughton
