= William Reynolds (New Zealand politician) =

New Zealand politician

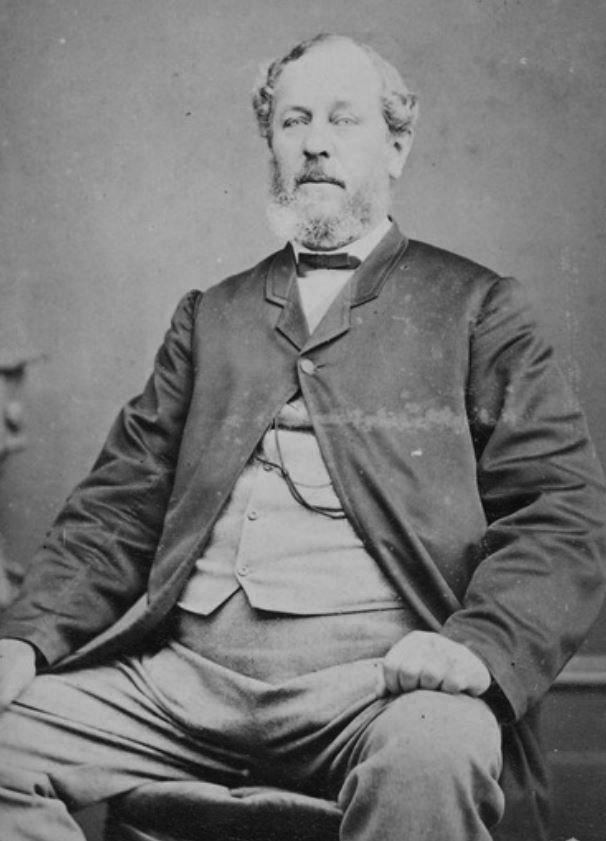

Member of the New Zealand Parliament for Dunedin and Suburbs South
- In office 6 Apr 1863 – 27 Jan 1866

Member of the New Zealand Parliament for City of Dunedin
- In office 9 Mar 1866 – 6 Dec 1875

Member of the New Zealand Parliament for Port Chalmers
- In office 10 Jan 1876 – 4 Mar 1878

Member of the New Zealand Legislative Council
- In office 30 Apr 1878 – 1 Apr 1899

Personal details
- Born: 1 May 1822 Chatham, Kent, England
- Died: 1 April 1899 (aged 76) Mornington, Dunedin, New Zealand
- Party: Independent
- Spouse: Rachel Pinkerton
- Relations: James Macandrew (brother-in-law)

William Hunter Reynolds (1 May 1822 – 1 April 1899) was a 19th-century businessman and Member of Parliament in Dunedin, Otago region, New Zealand. He was a cabinet minister. He is the only person who held membership on the Otago Provincial Council over the entire course of its existence (1853–1876), was Speaker of the council for three years, and was a member of the council's executive eight times.

== Early life ==
Reynolds was involved in shipping by trade, initially in partnership with his brother-in-law James Macandrew who had married his sister Elizabeth Hunter Reynolds. Reynolds himself married Rachel Pinkerton in 1856 and they raised nine children together.

== Political career ==
New Zealand Parliament
| Years | Term | Electorate | Party |
|---|---|---|---|
| 1863–1866 | 3rd | Dunedin and Suburbs South | Independent |
| 1866 | 4th | City of Dunedin | Independent |
| 1867–1870 | 4th | City of Dunedin | Independent |
| 1871–1875 | 5th | City of Dunedin | Independent |
| 1876–1878 | 6th | Port Chalmers | Independent |

In the inaugural 1853 provincial council elections, Reynolds was one of six representatives for the Dunedin Country electorate in the Otago Provincial Council (1853–1855). In the 1855 election, he successfully stood for the Town of Dunedin electorate. He represented that electorate, from the third council named City of Dunedin, until the abolition of provincial government in 1876. He was Speaker of Otago Province from May 1857 to December 1870. Between 1854 and 1865, he was on the council's executive on eight occasions.

He represented the Dunedin and Suburbs South electorate from 1863 to 1866, when the 3rd Parliament was dissolved. He then represented the City of Dunedin electorate in 1866 (resigned) and from 1867 to 1875. He then represented the Port Chalmers electorate (Port Chalmers was Dunedin's port) from 1876 to 1878, when he resigned.

He was appointed to the New Zealand Legislative Council on 30 April 1878, and served until his death.

In 1893 Reynolds was at the centre of a drama that led to the passing of the Women's suffrage bill into law. Premier Seddon had expected to stop the bill in the upper house, but found that one more vote was needed. Thomas Kelly, a new Liberal Party councillor had left himself paired in favour of the measure, but Seddon obtained his consent by wire to change his vote. Seddon's manipulation so incensed two opposition councillors, Reynolds and Edward Cephas John Stevens that they changed sides and voted for the bill, allowing it to pass by 20 votes to 18 and so gave the vote to women.

== Notes ==
New Zealand Parliament
| New constituency | Member of Parliament for Dunedin and Suburbs South; 1863–1866; Served alongside: James Paterson | Constituency abolished |
| In abeyance Title last held by Thomas Dick; James Paterson | Member of Parliament for City of Dunedin; 1866–1875; Served alongside: James Paterson; Thomas Birch; John Bathgate; Nathaniel Wales | Succeeded by James Macandrew; William Larnach; Robert Stout |
| Preceded by James Macandrew | Member of Parliament for Port Chalmers; 1876–1878 | Succeeded by James Green |
