= Isaac Newton Watt =

New Zealand Parliament
| Years | Term | Electorate | Party |
|---|---|---|---|
| 1862–1863 | 3rd | Town of New Plymouth | Independent |

Isaac Newton Watt (1821–1886) was a soldier, merchant and a Member of Parliament in Taranaki, New Zealand in the mid-to-late 19th century.

== Early life ==
He was born in London sometime in 1821, the son of Isaac Watt the land surveyor and Susanna Dunlop. His father Isaac (b. 1782) was born in Whitby, and was the son of a famous Whitby mariner, James Watt (b 1742). Isaac Newton Watt was the fourth of Isaac and Susanna's thirteen children.

He studied medicine at St Bartholemew's Hospital in London, but ran out of money and could not complete the course. In 1842 Isaac Newton Watt's sister Elizabeth died, aged 25. This left Isaac's brother-in-law Frederick Thatcher a depressed widower. With few prospects, the brothers-in-law, now friends, left London to start life afresh in New Zealand.

They sailed from Plymouth on the barque Himalaya, and landed in New Plymouth, New Zealand, on 23 December 1843. At this time the colony consisted of 1091 people - 617 males and 474 females. In early 1844 Isaac started off as a merchant and bought the Devon Hotel in New Plymouth. Frederick Thatcher started out as an architect in Wellington, and now his buildings can be seen all over Wellington in churches and wharves, most notably Old St Paul's in Mulgrave Street Wellington.

Isaac meanwhile was becoming a reasonably successful merchant, in a weak, puny colony. In 1846 he married Ami Raimpaha Hone Te Pai Tahuna, a Māori woman of the Te Āti Awa tribe, possibly a princess or the daughter of the chief. In 1847 their first child Newton Fullage was born, and in 1849 their second child Charles Llewellyn was as well.

== Provincial council ==
Through the early years of the 1850s Isaac Newton Watt came to be an influential and important man in the Province of New Plymouth. He was elected as a member of the provincial council in at the 1853 elections, and was a speaker in the council until 1856. He remained a member until 1861. In 1858 he became the resident magistrate for New Plymouth, and was involved the Mechanics Institute of New Plymouth, delivering many lectures on science, philosophy and literature.

== Military career ==
In early 1859 his military career began. The Taranaki Rifle Volunteer Corps had been founded late the last year, in response to growing settler concerns about Maori resistance to their land-buying approaches. A nomination of officers was held on 12 February 1859. Nine gentlemen were elected as officers, and Isaac Newton Watt was elected as captain. On 22 February 1860 Taranaki erupted into open war, as the First Taranaki war began after the illegitimate purchase of the Waitara block. The Taranaki militia was called out for active service. This militia included the Taranaki Rifle Volunteer Corps as well as a small mounted company.

The Corps was involved in the First Taranaki war through 1860 into early 1861, and later in 1863–1866.

== Member of Parliament ==
He represented the Town of New Plymouth electorate from 1862 to 1863, when he resigned. He was a member of the Taranaki Provincial Council, representing the New Plymouth electorate from 1853 to 1861. He was the first Speaker of the Provincial Council from 1853 to 1856, and was a member of the Executive Council from 1857 to 1859.

New Zealand Parliament
| Preceded by William Richmond | Member of Parliament for Town of New Plymouth; 1862–1863 | Succeeded by Henry Hanson Turton |
