= Nathaniel Young Armstrong Wales =

New Zealand politician

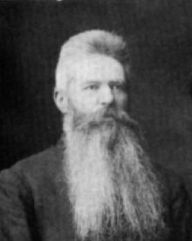
Nathaniel Young Armstrong Wales

Nathaniel Young Armstrong Wales (1832 – 3 November 1903) was a 19th-century architect, Member of Parliament, and Mayor in Dunedin, Otago, New Zealand.

== Biography ==
New Zealand Parliament
Years	Term	Electorate	Party
1874–1875	5th	City of Dunedin	Independent

Wales was born in Northumberland, England. He trained as an architect in Jedburgh, Scotland. He joined the Victorian gold rush in its early days and then migrated to Dunedin in 1861.

He was employed by the architect William Mason and in 1871 joined him as a partner in the firm.

He represented the City of Dunedin electorate from 1874 to 1875, when he retired.

He was later Mayor of Dunedin from 1895 to 1896. Coincidentally, Wales' partner Mason had held the same position during the 1860s.

== Notable designs ==
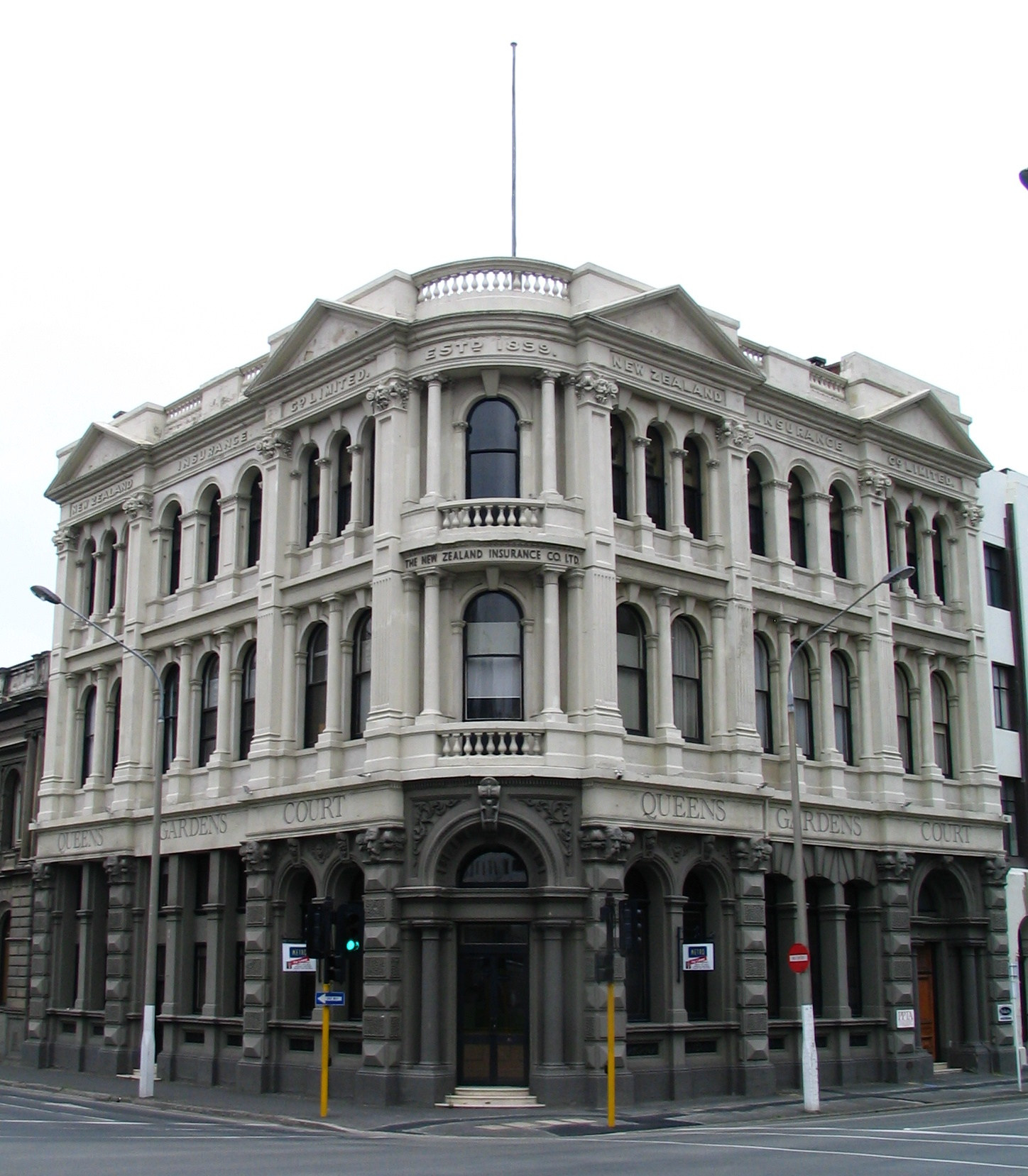
The former New Zealand Insurance Company Building

One of his notable designs is his own house at 38 Belgrave Crescent, which was built from stones quarried on the site. He designed the New Zealand Insurance Company Building, which is located on the corner of Queens Gardens and Crawford Street, and which is registered as a Category I heritage by Heritage New Zealand.
