= Chalmers (electorate) =

Chalmers, originally Port Chalmers, was a parliamentary electorate in the Otago Region of New Zealand, from 1866 to 1938 with a break from 1896 to 1902. It was named after the town of Port Chalmers, the main port of Dunedin and Otago.

== Population centres ==
In the 1865 electoral redistribution, the House of Representatives focussed its review of electorates to South Island electorates only, as the Otago gold rush had caused significant population growth, and a redistribution of the existing population. Fifteen additional South Island electorates were created, including Port Chalmers, and the number of Members of Parliament was increased by 13 to 70.

== History ==
Port Chalmers was first established in 1866 for the term of the 4th New Zealand Parliament. For the 1893 election, it was renamed as Chalmers. In 1896, the electorate was abolished, but it was re-created (again as Chalmers) for the 1902 election. The electorate was abolished again for the last time in 1938.

Due to World War II, the 1941 census was postponed. The next census was brought forward to 1945 so that the significant changes in population since the 1936 census could be taken into consideration in a 1946 electoral redistribution prior to the scheduled 1946 general election. At the same time, the Labour government abolished the country quota. The electoral redistribution changed all 76 electorates. When the draft electoral redistribution was released for consultation in early April 1946, it was proposed for the Dunedin North electorate to be abolished and most of its area was supposed to go to a re-created Chalmers electorate. Based on consultation feedback, the Port Chalmers Borough became part of the Oamaru electorate. With such a geographic change, the proposed name of Chalmers electorate was no longer viable and the electorate name Dunedin North changed to North Dunedin instead.

Thomas Dick was elected on 17 March 1866 and resigned on 15 October 1866. He successfully contested the 15 December 1866 by-election, but resigned again on 26 April 1867. David Forsyth Main succeeded him through the 1867 by-election.

James Macandrew died in February 1887 whilst holding the electorate. The 1887 by-election was won by James Mills. The 1887 election was contested by Mills and James Green, with Mills being successful.

James Dickson represented Chalmers for four parliamentary terms from the 1914 election until 1928, when he retired. Dickson was succeeded by another member of the Reform Party, Alfred Ansell, who won the 1928 and 1931 elections. In both elections, Ansell was challenged by Labour's Norman Hartley Campbell. Campbell had already won the nomination as the Labour candidate for the 1935 election against M. Connolly, when he died in February 1935 following an operation. The Labour Party hierarchy wanted to make Connolly their candidate, but there was resentment and a new ballot was held, which was won by Archie Campbell, the brother of Norman Hartley Campbell. Archie Campbell defeated Ansell with the swing to Labour in the 1935 election, but retired in 1938.

The electorate was represented by seven Members of Parliament from 1866 to 1896, and a further five MPs from 1902 to 1938. At the 1937 redistribution the electorate was split between Dunedin Central, Dunedin North and Oamaru electorates.

=== Members of Parliament ===
Key

Independent	Liberal	Liberal–Labour	Independent Liberal	Reform	Labour

Election	Winner
1866 election	Thomas Dick
1866 by-election	Thomas Dick
1867 by-election	David Main
1871 election	James Macandrew
1876 election	William Reynolds
1878 by-election	James Green
1879 election	James Macandrew
1881 election	James Macandrew
1884 election	James Macandrew
1887 by-election	James Mills
1887 election	James Mills
1890 election	James Mills
(electorate renamed as Chalmers)
1893 election	John A. Millar
(electorate abolished, 1896-1902)
1902 election	Edmund Allen
1905 election	Edmund Allen
1908 election	Edward Clark
1911 election	Edward Clark
1914 election	James Dickson
1919 election	James Dickson
1922 election	James Dickson
1925 election	James Dickson
1928 election	Alfred Ansell
1931 election	Alfred Ansell
1935 election	Archie Campbell
(Electorate abolished 1938)

== Election results ==
=== 1935 election ===
1935 general election: Chalmers
Party	Candidate	Votes	%	±%
Labour	Archie Campbell	4,596	53.30	
Reform	Alfred Ansell	3,525	40.88	−8.31
Democrat	Robert Fraser	501	5.81	
Informal votes		33	0.38	−0.05
Majority		1,071	12.42	
Turnout		8,622	89.07	+7.75
Registered electors		9,680		

=== 1931 election ===
1931 general election: Chalmers
Party	Candidate	Votes	%	±%
Reform	Alfred Ansell	3,870	49.19	
Labour	Norman Hartley Campbell	3,698	47.01	
Independent	Thomas Scollay	299	3.80	
Informal votes		34	0.43	
Majority		172	2.19	
Turnout		7,901	87.32	
Registered electors		9,048		

=== 1928 election ===
1928 general election: Chalmers
Party	Candidate	Votes	%	±%
Reform	Alfred Ansell	3,357	41.39	
Labour	Norman Hartley Campbell	2,738	33.76	
United	John Patrick Walls	1,965	24.23	
Independent Reform	William Adams McLachlan	50	0.62	
Majority		619	7.63	
Informal votes		75	0.92	
Turnout		8,185	90.11	
Registered electors		9,083		

=== 1902 election ===
1902 general election: Chalmers
Party	Candidate	Votes	%	±%
Liberal	Edmund Allen	2,614	56.63	
Conservative	John White	2,002	43.37	
Majority		612	13.26	
Turnout		4,616	76.54	
Registered electors		6,031		

=== 1893 election ===
1893 general election: Port Chalmers
Party	Candidate	Votes	%	±%
Liberal–Labour	John A. Millar	1,754	51.76	+9.23
Liberal	Edmund Allen	1,635	48.24	
Majority		119	3.51	
Turnout		3,389	70.44	+4.26
Registered electors		4,811		

=== 1890 election ===
1890 general election: Port Chalmers
Party	Candidate	Votes	%	±%
Independent	James Mills	874	57.46	
Liberal–Labour	John A. Millar	647	42.53	
Majority		227	14.92	
Turnout		1,521	66.18	
Registered electors		2,298		

=== 1878 by-election ===
1878 Port Chalmers by-election
Party	Candidate	Votes	%	±%
Independent	James Green	269	60.04	
Independent	Henry Dench	179	39.96	
Majority		90	20.09	
Turnout		448		

=== 1867 by-election ===
1867 Port Chalmers by-election
Party	Candidate	Votes	%	±%
Independent	David Forsyth Main	92	46.94	
Independent	Captain James Malcolm	81	41.33	
Independent	Hugh McDermid	22	11.22	
Independent	James McIndoe	1	0.51	
Independent	John Graham	0	0	
Majority		11	5.61	
Turnout		196		
