= 1866 New Zealand general election =

New Zealand general election

1866 general election
- 12 February – 6 April 1866

All 70 seats in the New Zealand House of Representatives
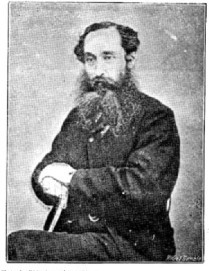
	First party
Leader	Edward Stafford
Party	Independent
Leader's seat	City of Nelson
Last election	70 seats
Seats won	70
Seat change	Steady
Premier before election
Edward Stafford
Independent
Subsequent Premier
Edward Stafford
Independent

The 1866 New Zealand general election was held between 12 February and 6 April to elect 70 MPs to the fourth term of the New Zealand Parliament.

In 1867 four Māori electorates were created, initially as a temporary measure for five years. The first Māori elections for these seats were held in 1868, with universal suffrage for Māori males over 21.

The first four Māori members of parliament were Tareha Te Moananui (Eastern Maori), Frederick Nene Russell (Northern Maori) and John Patterson (Southern Maori), who all retired in 1870; and Mete Kīngi Paetahi (Western Maori) who was defeated in 1871.

== Results ==
Member	Electorate	Province	MP's term	Election date
George Armstrong	Akaroa	Canterbury	First	21 February
Lancelot Walker	Ashley	Canterbury	Second	2 March
Archibald Clark	Auckland East	Auckland	Second	12 February
James Williamson	Auckland West	Auckland	Second	13 February
John Williamson	Auckland West	Auckland	Third	13 February
Crosbie Ward	Avon	Canterbury	Third	20 February
Hugh Carleton	Bay of Islands	Auckland	Fourth	5 March
John Cargill	Bruce	Otago	Third	7 March
Arthur Burns	Caversham	Otago	Second	16 March
David Monro	Cheviot	Canterbury	Third	19 February
James FitzGerald	City of Christchurch	Canterbury	Fourth	12 February
John Ormond	Clive	Hawke's Bay	Second	17 March
James Macandrew	Clutha	Otago	Fourth	9 March
John Cracroft Wilson	Coleridge	Canterbury	Second	31 January
Andrew Richmond	Collingwood	Nelson	Second	9 March
William Reynolds	City of Dunedin	Otago	Second	9 March
James Paterson	City of Dunedin	Otago	Second	9 March
Theodore Haultain	Franklin	Auckland	Third	22 February
Robert Graham	Franklin	Auckland	Second	22 February
Francis Jollie	Gladstone	Canterbury	Second	23 February
Charles O'Neill	Goldfields	Otago	First	26 February
Julius Vogel	Goldfields	Otago	Second	26 February
James Bradshaw	Gold Field Towns	Otago	First	16 March
James Richmond	Grey and Bell	Taranaki	Second	2 March
Charles Haughton	Hampden	Otago	Second	5 March
John Hall	Heathcote	Canterbury	Second	1 March
William Fitzherbert	Hutt	Wellington	Third	28 February
Alfred Ludlam	Hutt	Wellington	Third	28 February
William Wood	Invercargill	Southland	First	9 March
Joseph Beswick	Kaiapoi	Canterbury	First	16 February
Edward Hargreaves	Town of Lyttelton	Canterbury	First	3 March
William Baldwin	Manuherikia	Otago	Second	17 March
Francis Hull	Marsden	Auckland	First	5 March
Dillon Bell	Mataura	Southland	Third	10 March
Thomas Ball	Mongonui	Auckland	First	20 March
Charles Parker	Motueka	Nelson	Second	2 March
William Sefton Moorhouse^{a}	Mount Herbert	Canterbury	First	22 February
Donald McLean	Napier	Hawke's Bay	First	20 March
Oswald Curtis	City of Nelson	Nelson	First	20 February
Edward Stafford	City of Nelson	Nelson	Third	20 February
William Wells	Suburbs of Nelson	Nelson	Third	15 February
John Richardson	New Plymouth	Taranaki	Second	16 March
George Graham	Newton	Auckland	Second	15 February
James O'Neill	Northern Division	Auckland	Third	14 February
Thomas Henderson	Northern Division	Auckland	Third	14 February
Robert Campbell	Oamaru	Otago	First	23 March
Arthur Atkinson	Omata	Taranaki	First	9 March
Maurice O'Rorke	Town of Onehunga	Auckland	Second	20 February
Frederick Whitaker	Parnell	Auckland	First	16 February
Paul de Quincey	Pensioner Settlements	Auckland	First	15 February
Arthur Beauchamp	Picton	Marlborough	First	14 March
Alfred Brandon	Porirua	Wellington	Third	5 March
Thomas Dick	Port Chalmers	Otago	Second	17 March
Joseph Newman	Raglan	Auckland	First	23 February
William Watt	Rangitiki	Wellington	First	8 March
Donald Hankinson	Riverton	Southland	First	26 February
George Hepburn	Roslyn	Otago	First	22 March
Edward Stevens	Selwyn	Canterbury	First	26 February
Donald Reid	Taieri	Otago	First	7 March
Alfred Cox	Timaru	Canterbury	Second	20 February
William Murison	Waikouaiti	Otago	First	28 February
Arthur Oliver	Waimea	Marlborough	First	23 February
Henry Bunny	Wairarapa	Wellington	Second	3 March
William Eyes	Wairau	Marlborough	Second	23 February
Alexander McNeill	Wallace	Otago	First	6 April
John Bryce	Wanganui	Wellington	First	3 March
William Taylor	City of Wellington	Wellington	Second	1 March
Isaac Featherston	City of Wellington	Wellington	Fourth	1 March
Charles Borlase	City of Wellington	Wellington	First	1 March
William Sefton Moorhouse^{a}	Westland	Canterbury	Fourth	16 March

^{a} Moorhouse was elected in both the Mount Herbert and Westland electorates. He chose to represent Westland.
