= John Richardson (New Zealand politician) =

New Zealand politician, born 1810

The Honourable John Larkins Cheese Richardson MLC
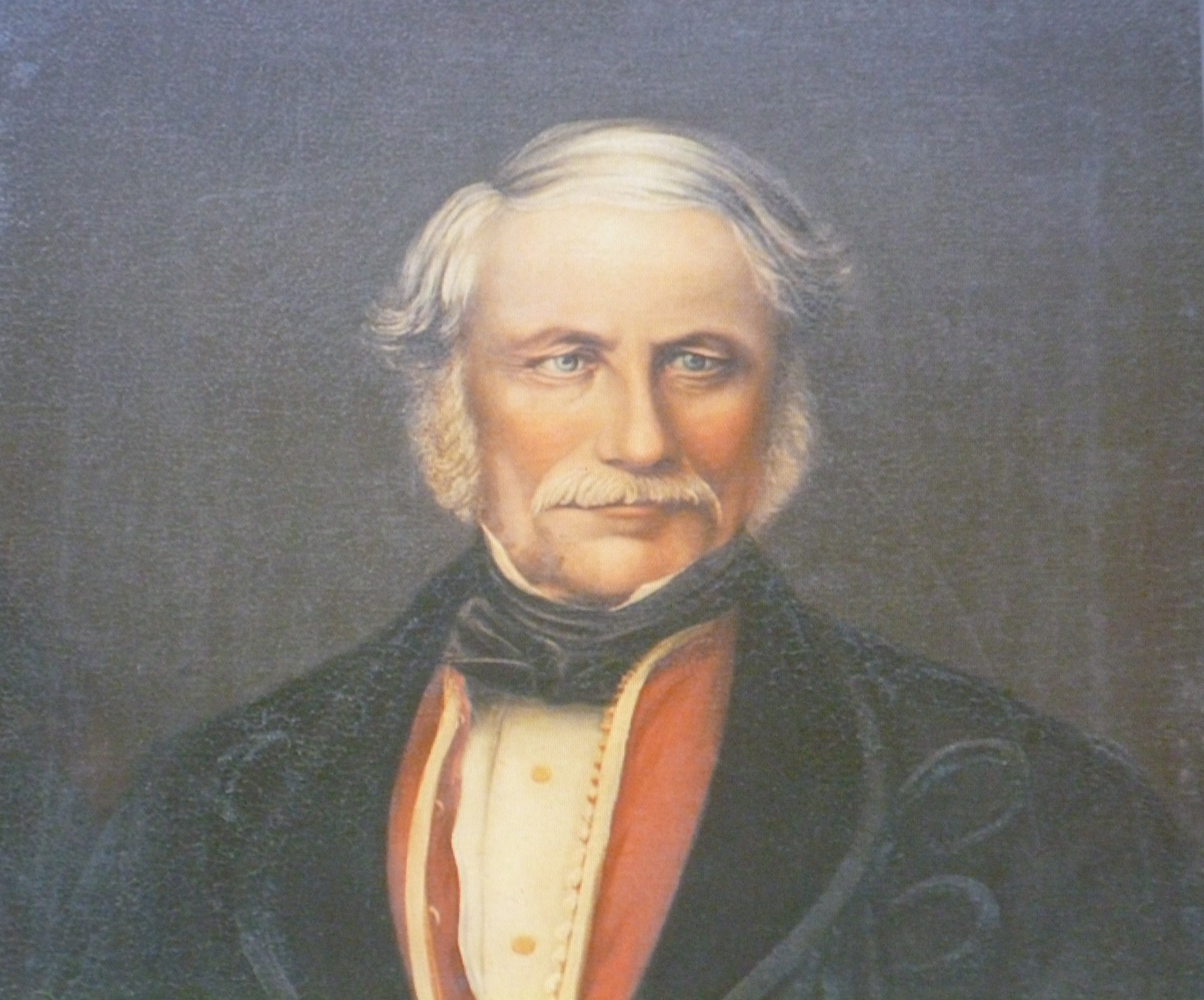

3rd Superintendent of Otago Province
- In office 17 May 1861 – 15 Apr 1863
- Preceded by: James Macandrew
- Succeeded by: John Hyde Harris

4th Speaker of the Legislative Council
- In office 1868–1879
- Preceded by: Thomas Bartley
- Succeeded by: William Fitzherbert

Personal details
- Born: 4 August 1810 Bengal, India
- Died: 6 December 1878 (aged 68) Dunedin, New Zealand
- Party: Independent

Sir John Larkins Cheese Richardson (4 August 1810 – 6 December 1878) was a 19th-century New Zealand politician, and a cabinet minister.

== Military career ==
Richardson was born in Bengal, India. His father was Robert Richardson, a civil servant of the East India Company who ran a silk factory. Richardson received his education at the Company's Military Seminary in Addiscombe, Surrey, England. Afterwards, he was in the Bengal Horse Artillery, and rose to the rank of Major. He took part in the Afghan Campaign, 1842 and was decorated for gallantry for his part in the attack on Istalif. In 1845–1846 Richardson also took part in the First Anglo-Sikh War.

== Political career ==
New Zealand Parliament
Years	Term	Electorate	Party
1862	3rd	City of Dunedin	Independent
1863–1866	3rd	Dunedin and Suburbs North	Independent
1866–1867	4th	Town of New Plymouth	Independent

He was Superintendent of Otago Province 1861–1862 at the start of the Otago gold rush. He then represented several electorates in Parliament: City of Dunedin in 1862 (resigned), then Dunedin and Suburbs North from 1863 to 1866, then Town of New Plymouth from 1866 to 1867, when he resigned.

He was then appointed to the Legislative Council, of which he was the Speaker from 1868 to 1879. He was knighted in 1874.

Richardson worked with Learmonth White Dalrymple to establish a girls' high school in Dunedin, and for women to be admitted as students of the University of Otago.

== University of Otago ==
Richardson was an inaugural member of the council of the University of Otago in 1869, becoming the university's Chancellor in 1871, and was also a member of the New Zealand University Council. He was responsible for allowing women to enroll at the university and helped to remove barriers for their entry. This allowed the university to be the first in Australasia to enroll women. The University of Otago's tallest building, the Richardson Building, is named in his honour. Richardson's granddaughter, Josephine Gordon Rich, studied with Thomas Jefferson Parker at the university, and published a scientific paper, but does not appear in student lists, probably because her home-schooling made her ineligible to enrol.

Richardson died at Dunedin on 6 December 1878 and was buried at Dunedin Northern Cemetery.

Political offices
Preceded by James Macandrew	Superintendent of Otago Province; 1861–1863	Succeeded by John Hyde Harris
Preceded by Thomas Gillies	Postmaster-General; 1864–1865	Succeeded by Edward Stafford
Preceded by Thomas Bartley	Speaker of the New Zealand Legislative Council; 1868–1879	Succeeded by William Fitzherbert
New Zealand Parliament
Preceded by Edward McGlashan	Member of Parliament for City of Dunedin; 1862; Served alongside: Thomas Dick	Succeeded by James Paterson
Preceded by Henry Sewell	Member of Parliament for Town of New Plymouth; 1866–1867	Succeeded by Harry Atkinson
