= Thomas Birch (New Zealand politician) =

New Zealand politician

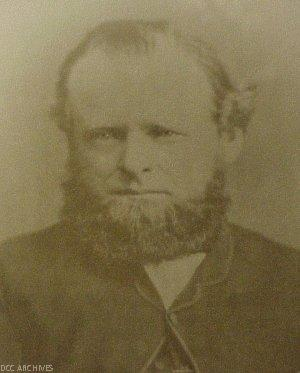

New Zealand Parliament
Years	Term	Electorate	Party
1869–1870	4th	City of Dunedin	Independent

Thomas Birch (1825 – 12 March 1880) was a 19th-century Member of Parliament in Dunedin, Otago, New Zealand.

He represented the City of Dunedin electorate from 1869 to 1870, when he retired.

He was the third Mayor of Dunedin.

Political offices
Preceded by John Hyde Harris	Mayor of Dunedin; 1868–1870	Succeeded by Henry Fish
