= Edward McGlashan =

New Zealand politician

Member of the New Zealand Parliament for City of Dunedin
- In office 24 Dec 1860 – 17 Mar 1862

Member of the New Zealand Parliament for Roslyn
- In office 12 Sep 1871 – 6 Dec 1875

Personal details
- Born: 12 December 1817 Edinburgh, Scotland
- Died: 31 July 1889 (aged 71) St Clair, Dunedin, New Zealand
- Party: Independent

Edward McGlashan (12 December 1817 – 31 July 1889) was a 19th-century Member of Parliament in Dunedin, Otago, New Zealand.

McGlashan was born in Edinburgh, Scotland, in 1817. His father's family were publishers to the University of Edinburgh. After receiving a good education, McGlashan worked in the book trade. Inspired by his brother's work as secretary for the Otago Association, he decided to emigrate and left in 1848. He went to Adelaide in South Australia, then Melbourne and finally Sydney, where he sold the books that he took with him for a good profit. There, he purchased provisions that he took with himself to Dunedin in 1850, which he could once again sell at a good profit. In 1853, he was joined in Dunedin by his older brother, John McGlashan.

Edward McGlashan worked at first as a registrar at the Supreme Court under Justice Sidney Stephen. He then leased a flour mill from William Henry Valpy on the Water of Leith. He also had a store and auction room in Princes Street. From 1858 until 1862, when the Otago gold rush began, he was in partnership with W. Carr Young, and they traded as Young and McGlashan. McGlashan visited England in 1862.

Edward McGlashan stood for election in the first Otago Provincial Council, and represented the Dunedin Country electorate from 28 September 1853 to 15 September 1855. He was unsuccessful at some later provincial elections. In 1865, he contested the superintendency, but was beaten by Thomas Dick. He would later represent the North Harbour electorate in the 6th and 7th council, from 17 March 1871 until the abolition of the provincial governments on 31 October 1876.

New Zealand Parliament
Years	Term	Electorate	Party
1860–1862	3rd	City of Dunedin	Independent
1871–1875	5th	Roslyn	Independent

He represented the City of Dunedin electorate from the 1860 general election to 1862 when he resigned; and then the Roslyn electorate from the 1871 Roslyn by-election to 1875, when he retired.

McGlashan had various business interests later in life. He dealt in stock and farmland, and owned Mount Stokes station. He owned steamers and was milling in The Catlins. He started to manufacture paper, but was unsuccessful in making it from tussock grasses. He moved to Timaru for some years and was a director of a number of companies, including a major shareholder in the New Zealand Shipping Company. After a long visit to England from 1881, he returned to Dunedin to live in St Clair.

McGlashan married twice, and his second wife was Henrietta, the daughter of George Bell; they married on 10 March 1880. McGlashan's health was poor for his last few years. He died on 31 July 1889 at his residence in St Clair, and was survived by his second wife.

== Notes ==
New Zealand Parliament
Preceded by James Macandrew	Member of Parliament for City of Dunedin; 1860–1862; Served alongside: Thomas Dick	Succeeded by John Richardson
Preceded by Henry Driver	Member of Parliament for Roslyn; 1871–1875	Succeeded by Arthur John Burns
