= Julius Vogel =

Premier of New Zealand (1873–1875, 1876)

The Right Honourable Sir Julius Vogel KCMG
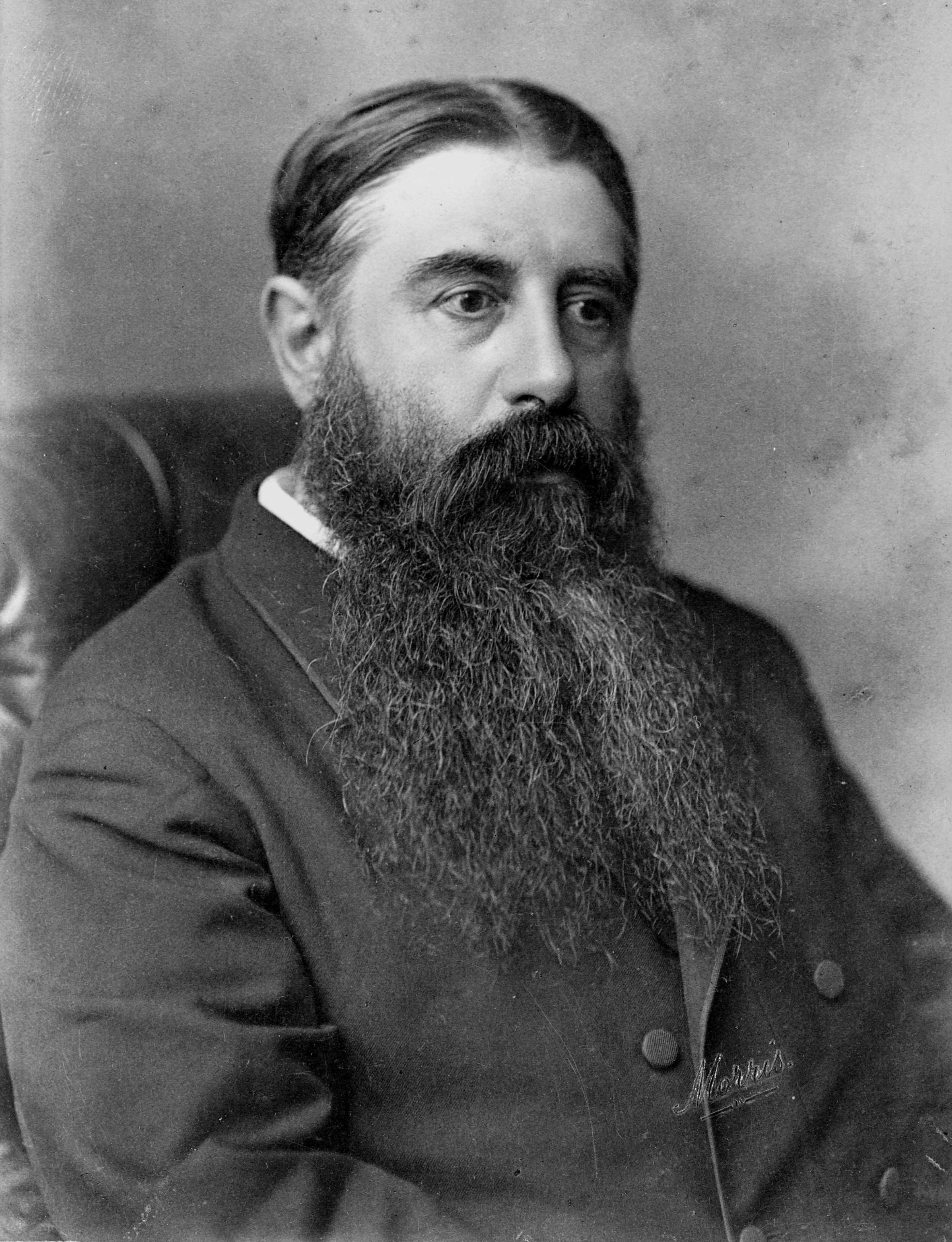

8th Premier of New Zealand
- In office 8 April 1873 – 6 July 1875
- Monarch: Victoria
- Governor: James Fergusson; George Phipps
- Preceded by: William Fox
- Succeeded by: Daniel Pollen
- In office 15 February 1876 – 1 September 1876
- Monarch: Victoria
- Governor: George Phipps
- Preceded by: Daniel Pollen
- Succeeded by: Harry Atkinson

Personal details
- Born: 24 February 1835 London, UK
- Died: 12 March 1899 (aged 64) Molesey, Surrey, UK
- Resting place: Willesden Jewish Cemetery, London, UK
- Party: None
- Spouse: Mary Clayton (m. 1867)
- Children: 4
- Relatives: William Clayton (father-in-law)
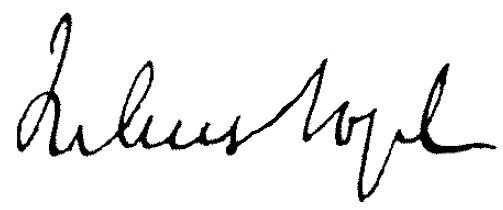
- Signature

Sir Julius Vogel (24 February 1835 – 12 March 1899) was the eighth premier of New Zealand. His administration is best remembered for the issuing of bonds to fund railway construction and other public works. He was the first Jewish prime minister of New Zealand. Historian Warwick R. Armstrong assesses Vogel's strengths and weaknesses:

Vogel's politics were like his nature, imaginative – and occasionally brilliant – but reckless and speculative. He was an excellent policymaker but he needed a strong leader to restrain him....Yet Vogel had vision. He saw New Zealand as a potential 'Britain of the South Seas', strong both in agriculture and in industry, and inhabited by a large and flourishing population.

== Early life ==
Born in London, Vogel received his early education at University College School in University College, Gower St London. He later studied chemistry and metallurgy at the Royal School of Mines (later part of Imperial College London). He emigrated to Victoria, Australia, in 1852, being editor of several newspapers on the goldfields, including the Inglewood Advertiser and the Maryborough and Dunolly Advertiser. After an unsuccessful attempt to enter the Victorian Parliament in the Avoca district in August 1861 (he lost to James Macpherson Grant and Benjamin George Davies), he left Australia for New Zealand and moved to Otago in October 1861, where he became a journalist for the Otago Witness. In November 1861, he founded the Otago Daily Times and became its first editor. In 1863 James Grant was charged with criminal libel against Vogel in an election pamphlet but was found not guilty by a jury.

On 19 March 1867, Vogel got married in Dunedin to his neighbour Mary "Polly" Clayton, the daughter of architect William Henry Clayton. They had three sons and one daughter.

== Political career ==
Vogel first became involved in politics in 1862, winning election to the provincial council of Otago. Four years later became the head of the provincial government, a post which he held until 1869.

=== Member of Parliament ===
New Zealand Parliament
| Years | Term | Electorate | Party |
|---|---|---|---|
| 1863–1866 | 3rd | Dunedin and Suburbs North | Independent |
| 1866–1870 | 4th | Goldfields | Independent |
| 1871–1875 | 5th | Auckland East | Independent |
| 1876 | 6th | Wanganui | Independent |
| 1884–1887 | 9th | Christchurch North | Independent |
| 1887–1889 | 10th | Christchurch North | Independent |

In 1863 he was unsuccessful in the 1863 by-election for Dunedin and Suburbs South. Later in an 1863 by-election he was elected a member of the New Zealand House of Representatives for the Dunedin and Suburbs North electorate.

In the 1866 election, he was defeated by William Murison in the Waikouaiti electorate on Wednesday, 28 February. It is unclear why Vogel stood in Waikouaiti as two days earlier, he had been returned unopposed at the nomination for the Goldfields electorate. On retiring from the provincial government in 1869, he joined the William Fox ministry as colonial treasurer, afterward holding the posts of postmaster-general, commissioner of customs, and telegraph commissioner at various times.

In 1870, as Colonial Treasurer he introduced his "grand go-ahead policy" or great Public Works policy to revitalise and develop the country by borrowing overseas to build railways, roads and telegraph lines and to attract immigrants.

The Fox ministry having been forced to resign, Vogel carried a vote of no confidence in their successors, and in October 1872, returned to power as leader in the Lower House, colonial treasurer and postmaster-general. He represented several electorates throughout the colony: Dunedin and Suburbs North 1863–1866, Goldfields in Otago 1866–1870, Auckland East 1871–1875, Wanganui 1876 (resigned) and Christchurch North 1884–1889 (resigned).

Vogel successfully contested the 1884 election in Christchurch North against John Crewes.

Vogel was the first Member of Parliament to be named in New Zealand. He was named on 15 November 1887 by the Speaker of the House Maurice O'Rorke for saying that his fellow Member Robert Thompson was 'want of manners' in a debate about Vogel's use of constabulary for household purposes – a charge he denied.

=== Premier of New Zealand ===
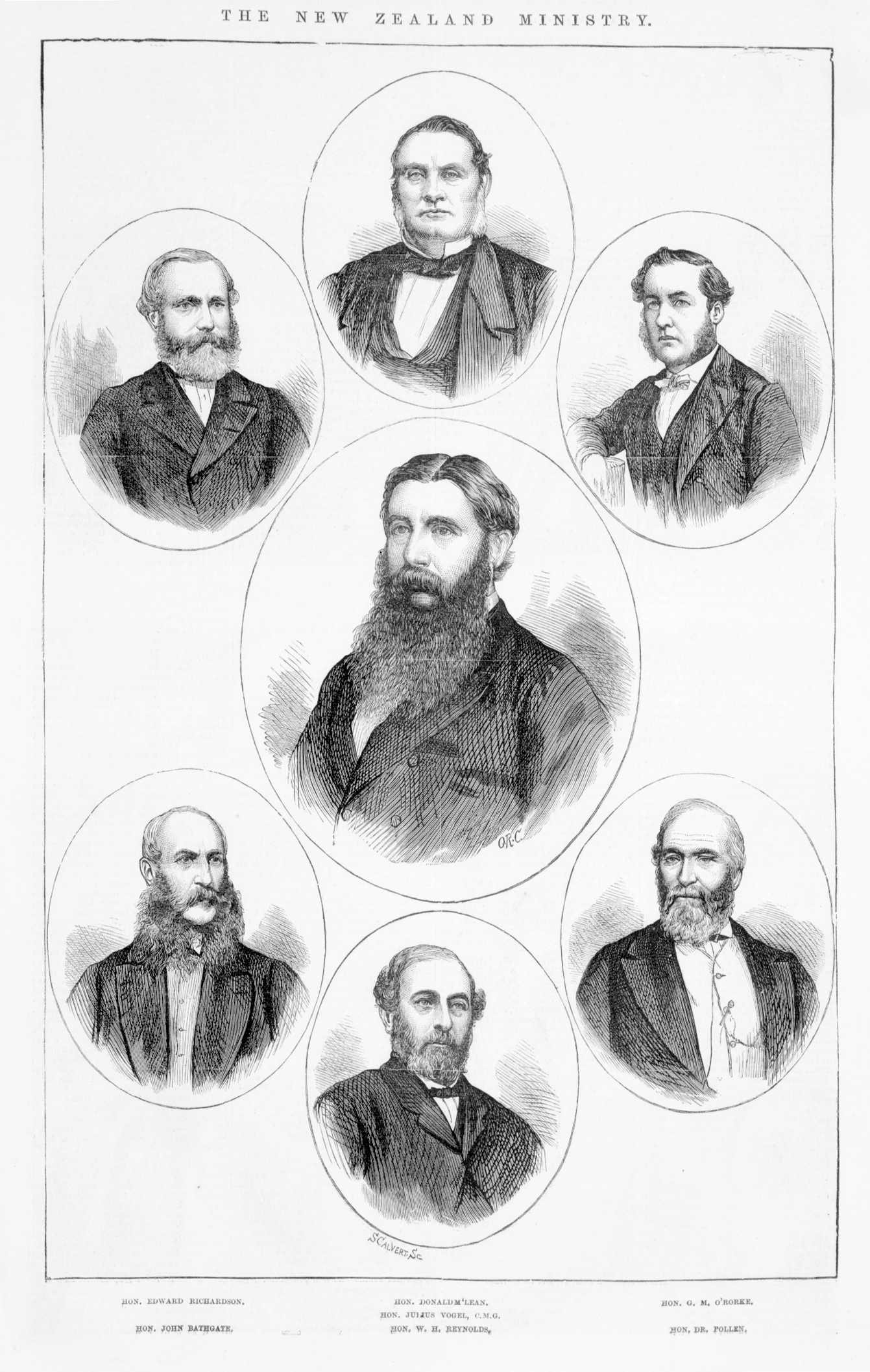
Vogel and his ministry (1873)

Vogel was premier from 1873 to 1875 and again in 1876. Vogel retired from premiership in August 1876 and celebrated his retirement with a ball in Nelson.

From 1876 to 1881, he was agent-general for New Zealand in London, and, in 1884, he was again a member of the government of the colony. During his political career, Vogel worked generally successfully for reconciliation with the Māori people. In 1887, he introduced the first women's suffrage Bill to Parliament, but suffrage was not granted until 1893. He was knighted in 1875. He finally gave up the colonial office in 1887; from which date he lived in England and was the Agent-General for New Zealand.

Vogel is best remembered for his "Great Public Works" scheme of the 1870s. Before 1870, New Zealand was a country largely dominated by provincial interests and pork-barrel politics. After Vogel, as colonial treasurer, proposed borrowing the massive sum of 10 million pounds, New Zealand developed a significant infrastructure of roads, railways and communication, all administered by central government.

Infrastructure included a 24,000-kilometre telegraph wire connecting London to New Zealand via India, Southeast Asia and Australia. The final piece was successfully installed 17 February 1876 at Schroder's Mistake, on the Whakapuaka native land block overseen by Hūria and Hemi Mātenga. The area was soon renamed Cable Bay.

Since Vogel, two other New Zealanders of Jewish descent have held the premiership: Francis Bell, an Anglican who briefly became prime minister in May 1925; and John Key, New Zealand's prime minister between 2008 and 2016 who was not religious despite attending synagogue as a child on occasion. Benjamin Disraeli, of Jewish descent but Anglican, was Prime Minister of the United Kingdom contemporaneously to Vogel's premiership.

== Life after politics ==
Vogel has a reputation as the first New Zealander to write a science-fiction novel: Anno Domini 2000, or, Woman's Destiny, published in 1889. It anticipated a utopian world where women held many positions of authority. New Zealand went on to become the first country to give women the vote, and, from 1997 to 2008, continuously had a female prime minister, while for a short period (2005–2006) women simultaneously held all five highest government positions (Monarch, Governor-General, Prime Minister, Speaker of the House and Chief Justice).

In honour of this book, the Sir Julius Vogel Awards for New Zealand speculative fiction take their name from him.

He died in London, having retired there in 1887 after electoral defeat. He had been an invalid for several years.

On his death at East Molesey in 1899, Vogel was interred in Willesden Jewish Cemetery in London.

== Namesakes ==
Several things bear his name today:

- The Sir Julius Vogel Awards for science fiction writing.
- Suburbs named Vogeltown, Wellington, and Vogeltown, New Plymouth.
- Vogel House, the former official residence of New Zealand prime ministers for most of the 20th century.
- Vogel Building in Wellington built for the Ministry of Works, now housing much of the Ministry of Justice. This building has been renamed the Justice Centre as of July 2013.
- Various streets throughout the country named Vogel Street, such as the one in his former constituency of Dunedin.

== See also ==
- New Zealand literature

== Sources ==
- Wilson, Jim (1985) [First published in 1913]. New Zealand Parliamentary Record, 1840–1984 (4th ed.). Wellington: V.R. Ward, Govt. Printer. OCLC 154283103.

Government offices
| Preceded by William Fox | Premier of New Zealand; 1873–1875; 1876 | Succeeded by Daniel Pollen |
| Preceded by Daniel Pollen | Premier of New Zealand; 1873–1875; 1876 | Succeeded by Harry Atkinson |
Political offices
| Preceded by Edward Stafford | Postmaster-General; 1869–1872; 1872–1876; 1884; 1884–1887 | Succeeded by Oswald Curtis |
| Preceded by Oswald Curtis | Postmaster-General; 1869–1872; 1872–1876; 1884; 1884–1887 | Succeeded by George McLean |
| Preceded by Richard Oliver | Postmaster-General; 1869–1872; 1872–1876; 1884; 1884–1887 | Succeeded by William Russell |
| Preceded by William Russell | Postmaster-General; 1869–1872; 1872–1876; 1884; 1884–1887 | Succeeded by Harry Atkinson |
| Preceded by John Hall | Electric Telegraph Commissioner; 1869–1872 | Position abolished |
| Preceded by Oswald Curtis | Telegraph Commissioner; 1873–1875 | Position abolished |
| New title | Commissioner of Telegraphs; 1875–1876; 1884; 1884–1887 | Succeeded by George McLean |
| Preceded by Richard Oliver | Commissioner of Telegraphs; 1875–1876; 1884; 1884–1887 | Succeeded by William Russell |
| Preceded by William Russell | Commissioner of Telegraphs; 1875–1876; 1884; 1884–1887 | Succeeded by Harry Atkinson |
Diplomatic posts
| Preceded by Isaac Featherston | Agent-General of New Zealand in the United Kingdom; 1876–1880 | Succeeded by Dillon Bell |
New Zealand Parliament
| New constituency | Member of Parliament for Dunedin and Suburbs North; 1863–1866; Served alongside: John Richardson | Electorate abolished |
| Preceded by John Bryce | Member of Parliament for Whanganui; 1876; Served alongside: John Bryce | Succeeded by William Fox |
| Preceded by Henry Thomson | Member of Parliament for Christchurch North; 1884–1889 | Succeeded by Edward Wingfield Humphreys |
