= James Macandrew =

New Zealand politician

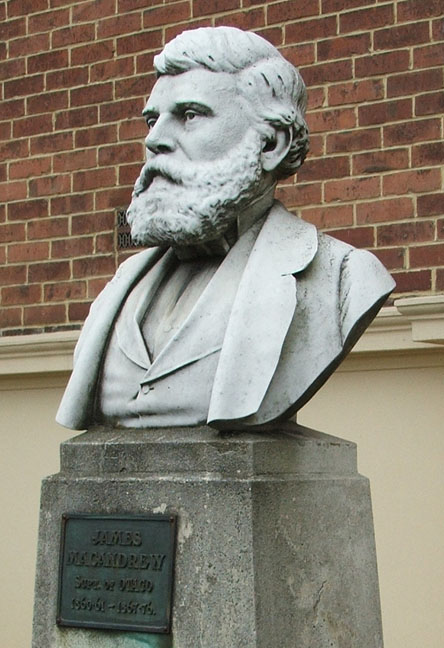
Bust of James Macandrew outside Toitū Otago Settlers Museum, Dunedin

James Macandrew (1819(?) – 24 February 1887) was a New Zealand ship-owner and politician. He served as a Member of Parliament from 1853 to 1887 and as the last Superintendent of Otago Province.

== Early life ==
Macandrew was born in Scotland, probably in Aberdeen, where he was baptised on 18 May 1819.

He became active in the Free Church of Scotland, and from there, in the proposed colonisation of Otago (which was being advocated by the Lay Association of the Free Church of Scotland, later the Otago Association). In partnership with his brother-in-law William Reynolds, Macandrew bought a schooner, loaded it with cargo, and set sail for Otago with his family. He arrived in January 1851.

Still working in partnership with his brother-in-law, Macandrew immediately became a major figure in the business community of Dunedin. Reynolds, his brother-in-law, began to build up a shipping business, while Macandrew himself established a trading firm in the city. The partners later established a steamer service between Dunedin and Melbourne, Australia. The two soon became very wealthy.

== Political career ==
New Zealand Parliament
Years	Term	Electorate	Party
1853–1855	1st	Town of Dunedin	Independent
1855–1858	2nd	Town of Dunedin	Independent
1859–1860	2nd	Town of Dunedin	Independent
1865–1866	3rd	Bruce	Independent
1866–1870	4th	Clutha	Independent
1871–1875	5th	Port Chalmers	Independent
1875–1879	6th	City of Dunedin	Independent
1879–1881	7th	Port Chalmers	Independent
1881–1884	8th	Port Chalmers	Independent
1884–1887	9th	Port Chalmers	Independent

Macandrew was one of six representatives for the Dunedin Country electorate in the first Otago Provincial Council (1853–1855). He represented the Central electorate in the second provincial council (1855–1859), and the Port Chalmers electorate in the fourth provincial council (1863–1867). Macandrew was Superintendent of Otago Province from 1860 to 1861, and again from 1867 until abolition in 1876. He was Speaker of Otago Province twice (1853–1854, and 1856–1859). From January to November 1854, he was on the council's executive.

When it was formed, Macandrew was elected to the New Zealand Parliament, representing the Town of Dunedin electorate. In Parliament, he fought what he saw as a bias towards the northern provinces (Auckland and Wellington) at the expense of his own Otago. He also defended the practice of opening Parliament with prayers (describing them as a necessary "acknowledgement of dependence on the Divine Being"), and lobbied that all Parliamentary debates be published.

He remained in Parliament until his death on 24 February 1887, having served in nine separate terms for the electorates. He first served for Town of Dunedin 1853–1858 (he resigned on 2 November 1858). He successfully contested a 14 January 1859 by-election in the same electorate and served until the end of the parliamentary term in 1860. Next, he served in the Bruce electorate 1865–1866, followed by Clutha 1866–1870, Port Chalmers 1871–1875 and City of Dunedin 1875–1879. His last term was in Port Chalmers again from 1879 to 1887, when he died.

He was Minister of Works from 5 March 1878 to 8 October 1879. For his last six and a half years in Parliament, he held the title of Father of the House, as the longest continuously serving MP.

== Personal life ==
Macandrew and his wife had four daughters and four sons. One son, Dr Herbert Macandrew, became medical superintendent of the Seaview Asylum in Hokitika.

He died one day after an accident in Dunedin which occurred on 23 February 1887.

== Commemoration ==
The town of Macandrew Bay on the Otago Peninsula is named after James Macandrew, and Dunedin's former main sporting venue, Carisbrook is named after his former home in the city.

Macandrew Road in Port Chalmers is named after him.

Macandrew is buried at Macandrew Bay Cemetery.

== Notes ==
Political offices
Preceded by William Cargill	Superintendent of Otago Province; 1860–1861; 1867–1877	Succeeded by John Richardson
Preceded by Thomas Dick	Superintendent of Otago Province; 1860–1861; 1867–1877	Provincial Councils abolished
New Zealand Parliament
New constituency	Member of Parliament for Town of Dunedin; 1853–1860	Succeeded by Thomas Dick; Edward McGlashan
Preceded by Edward Cargill	Member of Parliament for Bruce; 1865–1866; Served alongside: Arthur John Burns	Succeeded by John Cargill
New constituency	Member of Parliament for Clutha; 1866–1871	Succeeded by James Thomson
Preceded by David Forsyth Main	Member of Parliament for Port Chalmers; 1871–1875; 1879–1887	Succeeded by William Reynolds
Preceded by James Green	Member of Parliament for Port Chalmers; 1871–1875; 1879–1887	Succeeded by James Mills
Honorary titles
Preceded by Alfred Brandon	Father of the House; 1881–1887	Succeeded by Sir Maurice O'Rorke
