= Thomas Dick (politician) =

New Zealand politician

The Honourable Thomas Dick
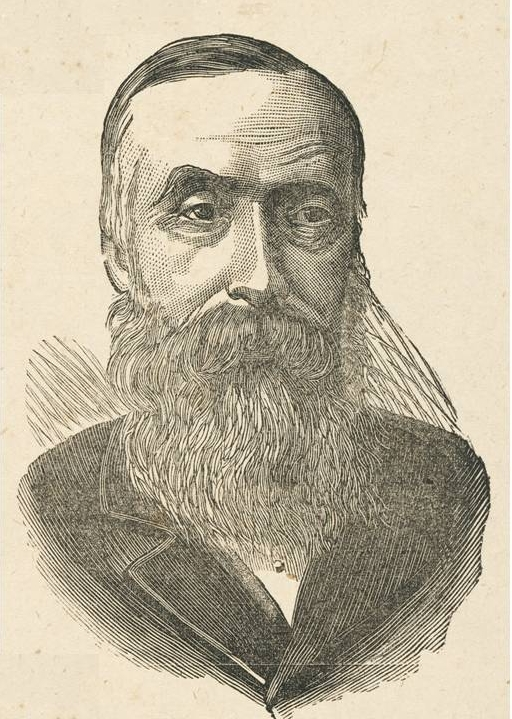
- Thomas Dick in 1882

5th Superintendent of Otago Province
- In office 4 August 1865 – 26 February 1867
- Preceded by: John Hyde Harris
- Succeeded by: James Macandrew

17th Colonial Secretary of New Zealand
- In office 5 March 1880 – 16 August 1884
- Governor: The Lord Rosmead; James Prendergast; The Baron Stanmore; William Jervois
- Preceded by: John Hall
- Succeeded by: William Montgomery

7th Minister of Justice
- In office 23 April 1881 – 11 October 1882
- Preceded by: William Rolleston
- Succeeded by: Edward Connolly

3rd Minister of Education
- In office 15 December 1880 – 16 August 1884
- Preceded by: William Rolleston
- Succeeded by: William Montgomery

Personal details
- Born: 13 August 1823 Edinburgh, Scotland
- Died: 5 February 1900 (aged 76) Dunedin, New Zealand

Thomas Dick (13 August 1823 – 5 February 1900) was a 19th-century New Zealand politician. Originally a merchant, he worked in London and then represented his firm on Saint Helena for seven years. From there, he was sent to Dunedin as the company's representative; he emigrated with an extended family. He soon became involved in politics and was Superintendent of Otago Province from 1865 until 1867. Over a period of 24 years, he represented various Dunedin electorates in Parliament and was Colonial Secretary (1880–1884), Minister of Justice from 1881 to 1882, and Minister of Education from 1881 to 1884. A deeply religious man, he was involved in many church affairs. He was one of the founders of Hanover Street Baptist Church; the building is now classified as Category I by Heritage New Zealand.

== Early life ==
Dick was born in Edinburgh, the son of Thomas Dick and Marjorie Dick (née Sherriff). The family moved to London, but he was sent back to Edinburgh for his education. He was employed by London merchandise firms and his second employer sent him to Saint Helena as their company representative in 1850 for seven years. There he married his second wife, Elizabeth Clarissa Darling in 1850. He was transferred to Dunedin, New Zealand, in 1857, arriving there with his wife, four children, his wife's mother (Elizabeth Darling) and his wife's siblings on the ship Bosworth on 26 November. He became an auctioneer in Dunedin.

== Political career ==
New Zealand Parliament
Years	Term	Electorate	Party
1860–1862	3rd	City of Dunedin	Independent
1862–1863	3rd	City of Dunedin	Independent
1866	4th	Port Chalmers	Independent
1866–1867	4th	Port Chalmers	Independent
1879–1881	7th	City of Dunedin	Independent
1881–1884	8th	Dunedin West	Independent

Dick was active in politics in the Otago District of New Zealand. He was elected to the Otago Provincial Council on 12 February 1859. He was Provincial Secretary for several years and was Superintendent from 1865 to 1867.

The 1865 election for the Superintendency was caused by the resignation on 23 June 1865 of John Hyde Harris, who claimed significant differences in opinion with his executive, as well as a need to devote more time to his private financial affairs, as reasons for his resignation. At the nomination meeting, Dick, Henry Clapcott and Edward McGlashan were proposed. Clapcott had been on the Executive of the Provincial Council from May 1864 (when he was first elected onto the council) until April 1865. McGlashan had been on the first Council (1853–1855) and had represented the City of Dunedin electorate in Parliament from 1860 until his resignation in 1862. Clapcott withdrew his candidacy (apparently, he was not well received by the voters) and resigned from the council a month later. The election was held on 4 August 1865 and with 990 votes to 565, Dick achieved a clear majority.

He represented four Dunedin electorates, first the City of Dunedin electorate from 1860 to 1862 and 1862 to 1863, then the Port Chalmers electorate in 1866 and 1866–1867, then the City of Dunedin electorate again from 1879 to 1881, then the Dunedin West electorate from 1881 to 1884, when he was defeated by William Downie Stewart by 504 votes to 480 in the 1884 election. Previously he had not been defeated; he had resigned the seat he then held in 1862, 1863, 1866, 1867 and 1881. Dick contested the Dunedin West electorate again in the 1887 election, but he was again defeated by Stewart by a similar margin (708 votes to 695). He was then offered to be appointed to the Legislative Council, but he declined and retired from politics.

In Port Chalmers, Dick was elected on 17 March 1866 and resigned on 15 October 1866. He successfully contested the 15 December 1866 by-election, but resigned again on 26 April 1867. David Forsyth Main succeeded him through the 1867 by-election.

Dick served in three Ministries: Hall, Whitaker, and the third Atkinson. He was Colonial Secretary from 5 March 1880 and held this role continuously until the defeat of the third Atkinson Ministry on 16 August 1884. He was appointed Minister of Education on 15 December 1880 in the Hall Ministry and also continuously served in this role until 16 August 1884. He was appointed Minister of Justice on 23 April 1881 in the Hall Ministry and held this role until 11 October 1882 during the term of the Whitaker Ministry. He was Postmaster-General and Electric Telegraph Commissioner in the Whitaker Ministry (11 October 1882 – 25 September 1883).

The author of The History of Otago says about Dick that "he distinguished himself more by an assiduous devotion to duty than by any display of brilliance."

== Religion ==
Dick was deeply involved in church matters. He became a baptist on Saint Helena, but was open-minded to all other evangelical churches. He was one of the original trustees of Knox Church in Dunedin. As the population grew during the gold mining days, he was one of the founders Hanover Street Baptist Church and became one of the trustees. In 1991, the church building was classified a Category I historic place by the New Zealand Historic Places Trust (since renamed to Heritage New Zealand), with registration number 4792.

== Family and death ==
In London, he married Mary Barber in 1846. A daughter, Eliza Mary, was born the following year. His daughter married Henry Purdie in 1872 and died on 31 July 1892 in Christchurch and is buried at Linwood Cemetery.

His first wife died in 1849, and he remarried in 1850 at Saint Helena to Elizabeth Clarrissa Darling, and there were two sons and one daughter by this marriage. His wife's mother and siblings had emigrated with them, and many of the Dick and Darling family are buried in the family grave at the Dunedin Southern Cemetery. His elder son, Thomas Hudson Dick (b. 1852, Saint Helena – d. 19 June 1921) was a rope maker and signed up at 19 to serve in the machine gun corps. His last address was in the Dunedin suburb of Mornington. His daughter, Elizabeth (Lizzie) Low died on 9 September 1924. Both Thomas and Elizabeth Low are buried in the family grave.

His son James Bertram Dick (1859-1930) married Edith Ellen Boot (1865-1945) in 1893. He became a bank manager, and she became a national officer in the Women's Christian Temperance Union New Zealand in 1896. His last address was George Street, Dunedin. He is also buried at Dunedin Southern Cemetery, but not in the family grave.

His mother-in-law, Elizabeth Darling, who had been born on Saint Helena, died on 9 April 1883. His sister-in-law, Agnes Darling, married Andrew Fleming. From 1865, 'Dick & Fleming' traded as land agents. Agnes Fleming died at her residence in Molesworth Street, Wellington on 16 June 1899 and was also interred at Dunedin Southern Cemetery. Another sister-in-law, Charlotte Darling, married Henry Wirgman Robinson. She died at Naseby on 26 October 1873 in childbirth, aged 35, and was also buried in the family grave.

Thomas Dick's second wife died on 29 April 1869 at their residence 'Viewmount' in Queen Street, Dunedin. She is also buried at South Dunedin Cemetery.

He remarried in 1871 to Elizabeth "Eliza" Reid Walker (née Stewart) at Invercargill. She was the widow of Frederick Walker (d. 1866), who was Provincial Treasurer of Otago and whom Dick knew from the voyage on the Bosworth. Eliza Reid Dick was a founding secretary in May 1885 of the Dunedin chapter of the Women's Christian Temperance Union New Zealand (WCTU NZ). She continued supporting the WCTU NZ campaigns, including signing the petition for women to win the right to vote in 1893. She served as the president of the Dunedin Union from 1895 to 1899, hosting the national convention for the WCTU NZ in Dunedin in April 1896. She assisted with the work and fundraising for the Leavitt House and the Sailor's Rest, both religiously inspired social reform efforts in Dunedin.

Dick died at his residence 'Viewmount' on 5 February 1900. He was survived by his third wife, one daughter and his two sons. He is buried at the Dunedin Southern Cemetery.

Dick Street in Kihikihi is named for him. Elizabeth Reid Dick died in 1906 and is buried in the family grave.

== Notes ==
Political offices
Preceded by John Hyde Harris	Superintendent of Otago Province; 1865–1867	Succeeded by James Macandrew
Preceded by William Rolleston	Minister of Education; 1880–1884	Succeeded by William Montgomery
Preceded by William Rolleston	Minister of Justice; 1881–1882	Succeeded by Edward Conolly
Preceded by Walter Johnston	Postmaster-General; 1882–1883	Succeeded by Richard Oliver
New title	Electric Telegraph Commissioner; 1882–1883	Succeeded by Richard Oliver
New Zealand Parliament
Preceded by James Macandrew	Member of Parliament for City of Dunedin; 1860–1863; Served alongside: Edward McGlashan, John Richardson, James Paterson; 1879–1881; Served alongside: Richard Oliver, William Downie Stewart	In abeyance Title next held by William Reynolds; James Paterson
Preceded by James Macandrew	Member of Parliament for City of Dunedin; 1860–1863; Served alongside: Edward McGlashan, John Richardson, James Paterson; 1879–1881; Served alongside: Richard Oliver, William Downie Stewart	In abeyance Title next held by William Hutchison; David Pinkerton; Henry Fish
New constituency	Member of Parliament for Port Chalmers; 1866–1867	Succeeded by David Forsyth Main
New constituency	Member of Parliament for Dunedin West; 1881–1884	Succeeded by William Downie Stewart
