= Mosgiel =

Mosgiel Te Konika o te Matamata
- Town
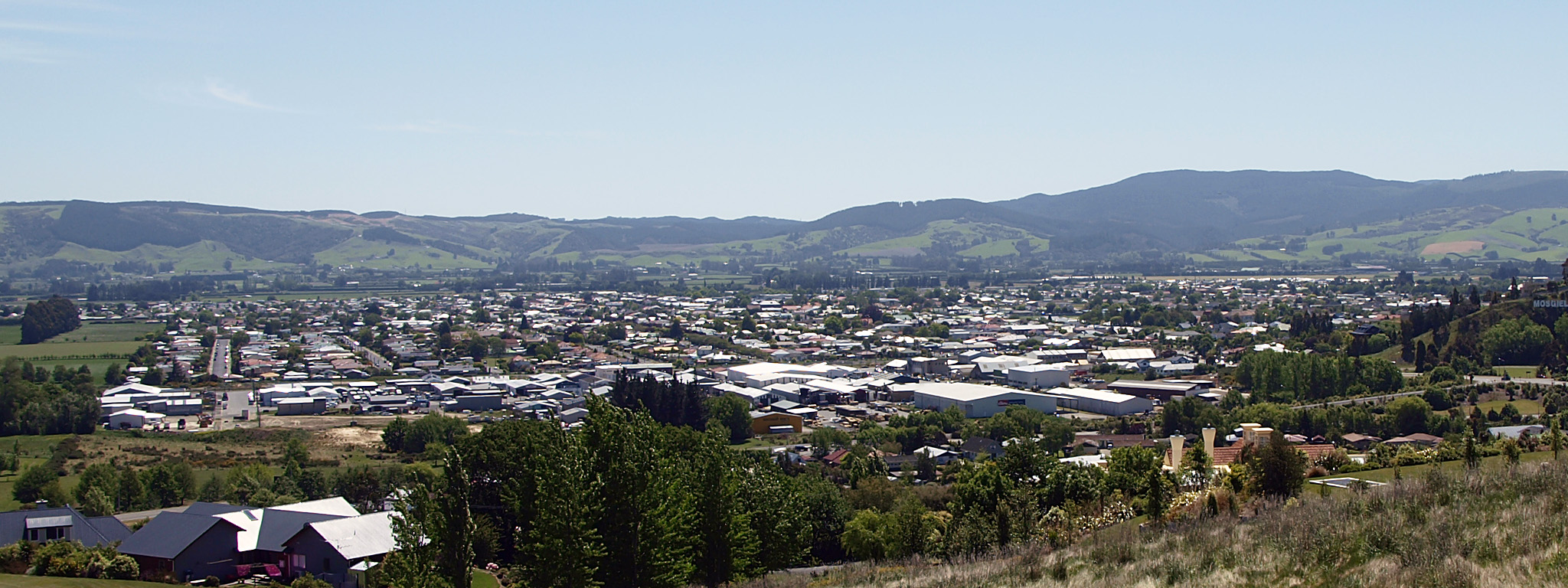
- Interactive map of Mosgiel
- Coordinates: 45°52′30″S 170°20′55″E
- Country: New Zealand
- Region: Otago
- District: Dunedin
- Community board: Mosgiel-Taieri Community Board
- Electorates: Taieri; Te Tai Tonga (Māori)

Government
  - Territorial authority: Dunedin City Council
  - Regional council: Otago Regional Council
  - Mayor of Dunedin: Sophie Barker
  - Taieri MP: Ingrid Leary
  - Te Tai Tonga MP: Mananui Ramsden

Area
  - Total: 17.28 km^{2} (6.67 sq mi)

Population (June 2025)
  - Total: 15,100
  - Density: 874/km^{2} (2,260/sq mi)
- Time zone: UTC+12 (NZST)
  - Summer (DST): UTC+13 (NZDT)
- Post code: 9024
- Area code: 03

Mosgiel (/ˈmɒzɡiːl/) is a town on the Taieri Plain in Otago, New Zealand, 17 km (11 mi) west of Dunedin. Since the re-organisation of New Zealand local government in 1989 it has been administered by the Dunedin City Council. Mosgiel has a population of approximately 15,100 as of June 2025. A nickname for Mosgiel is "The pearl of the plain". Its low-lying nature does pose problems, making it prone to flooding after heavy rains. Mosgiel takes its name from Mossgiel Farm, Ayrshire, the farm of the poet Robert Burns, the uncle of the co-founder in 1848 of the Otago settlement, the Reverend Thomas Burns. (Note: A popular, though probably apocryphal, local theory is that the extra "s" was dropped at a time when the cost of telegrams was calculated by the number of characters. The name of the Dunedin suburb of Roslyn (named for Rosslyn in Scotland) is similarly truncated. These two places were sites of major woollen mills – as was the town of Milton 40 kilometres (25 mi) to the south, where name may originally have been Milltown. Whether there is any connection between the location of the mills and name truncation, or whether it is a mere coincidence, is unknown.)

Mosgiel stands at the north-eastern extremity of the Taieri Plain. The Silver Stream, a tributary of the Taieri River, runs through its north end. Between Mosgiel and the centre of Dunedin stand the rugged Three Mile Hill and Scroggs Hill, which form part of the crater-wall of a long-extinct volcano, the crater being the Otago Harbour. To the south of the town lies one of the many peaks that formed part of the volcano: Saddle Hill, a prominent landmark, visible from a considerable distance and notable for its distinctive shape, lies south of State Highway One where Kinmont Park, a new housing subdivision is located at the foot of the hill.

The Dunedin Southern Motorway, upgraded in 2003, links Mosgiel with the centre of Dunedin. State Highway 87 to Kyeburn starts at a junction with State Highway 1 at the southeastern edge of Mosgiel, the first part of the highway being the main street of Mosgiel, Gordon Road.

== Legend and early history ==
The site of Mosgiel figures in Māori legend, but surrounding features of the Taieri Plain and adjacent hills have older mythical associations. Of the canoes of South Island migratory legend the fourth and fifth, Tākitimu and Āraiteuru, are mentioned in connection with the area. Maungatua, the large hill to the west of the plain, represents a huge wave which struck the Takitimu, throwing overboard Aonui, who became a pillar on the Tokomairaro Beach. Another account makes Aonui a female survivor of the wreck of the Ārai Te Uru, built by Kahui Tipua, who had arrived earlier but sent this vessel to the Polynesian homeland Hawaiki to get kūmara. On its return the canoe suffered shipwreck at Shag Point in North Otago, but its survivors quested about the land in search of supplies. If they failed to get back before dawn they turned into natural landscape-features, and this fate befell Aonui. These ancient traditions suggest that some of the earliest Polynesian settlers in the south knew the Taieri Plain.

W.R. Kirk repeated the later story of a taniwha (water-monster), the "familiar spirit or guardian of Te Rakitaounere (also given as Te Rakitauneke) a famous chief and warrior" who lost his master about the Dunedin hills, slithered down the Silverstream, 'Whaka-ehu', and 'lay down and left a hollow Te Konika o te Matamata' on the site of Mosgiel. The taniwha (named Matamata) wriggled down the Taieri, making its tortuous course, and when he died became the seaboard hills, including Saddle Hill. This story has associations with Kāti Māmoe, ('Ngāti Mamoe' in modern standard Māori) of the late 17th or early 18th century. According to tradition this period also saw the occupation of the kaik (unfortified settlement) near modern Henley – called Tai-ari like the river – and on the hill above it a pā, or fortified settlement, called Omoua. Tukiauau built a pā called Whakaraupuka on the west side of Lake Waihola and his rival, Tuwiriroa, came down from Lake Wakatipu and built one at Taieri Mouth on the coast. Māori soon abandoned Whakaraupuka, but the Taiari settlement at Henley endured into modern times. (Anderson, 1998.)

In February 1770 Captain James Cook described the saddle-shaped hill which became known as Saddle Hill, the landmark east of Mosgiel. The Weller brothers of the Otago whaling station on Otago Harbour (modern Ōtākou) sent a Mr. Dalziel to inspect the Taieri Plain for a proposed Scottish settlement in 1839, but he gave an unfavourable report. In 1844 Edward Shortland noticed Māori running pigs on the landward slopes of Saddle Hill or Makamaka (as he recorded the hill's Māori name). Charles Kettle surveyed the plain and coastal hills for the Otago Association in 1846 and 1847. He also climbed the westward hills and saw the raised land beyond, the nearest approach of the Central Otago plateau to the sea, which he correctly identified as potentially fine pastoral country.

Following the arrival of the Association's settlers at Dunedin in 1848, a Scots shepherd, Jaffray, brought his wife and dogs along the Māori track from Kaikorai Valley and settled on Saddle Hill in a whare (a Māori-style house) in 1849, establishing the first European farmstead in the district. In the same year the Reverend Thomas Burns, spiritual leader of the Association's settlement, selected the land which would become Mosgiel.

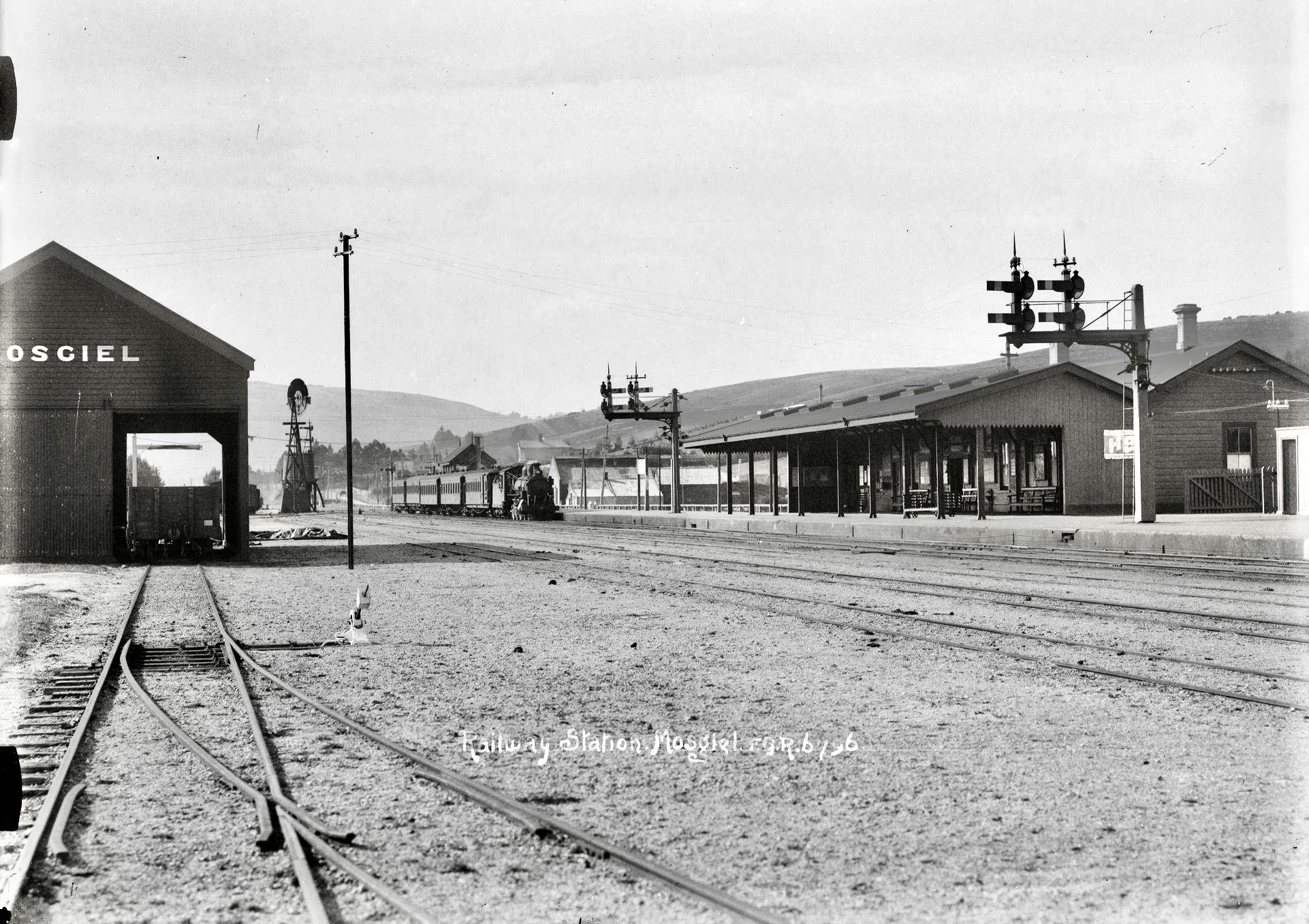
Mosgiel railway station about 1920. The building remains and is now leased

In the mid-1850s Arthur John Burns, a son of Thomas Burns, settled on some of the land. A large stand of native bush stood nearby. The richness of the land and the proximity of the main south road, more or less following the route of an old Māori track, led to early close rural settlement.

The 1861 Otago gold rush saw the development of a road – leading west to the interior – which intersected the site. Arthur John Burns's establishment of the Mosgiel Woollen Company and mill in 1871 brought the settlement of workers in cottages. 1875 saw the north-south road paralleled by a railway, with a branch to the west constructed in 1877. The authorities declared the Mosgiel Town District in 1882 and constituted a Borough Council in 1885. The town grew and became the most substantial in the district. The surrounding plain became a sort of Home County to Dunedin, a place of prosperous farms and of the large houses of successful businessmen with rural tastes. Horse-breeding and racing flourished.

== Mosgiel in the twentieth century ==
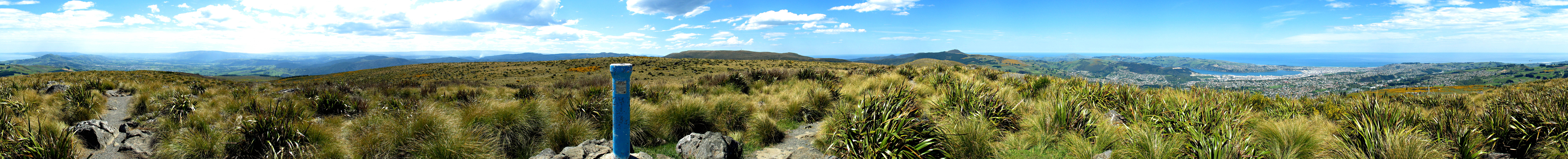
Panorama from the summit of Flagstaff Hill, Dunedin, with Mosgiel on the far left.

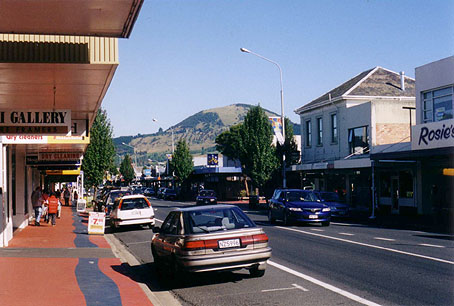
Gordon Road, Mosgiel, with Saddle Hill in the background.

From 1900 to 1997, Mosgiel was the site of Holy Cross College, the national Roman Catholic seminary for the training of priests. The seminary was located on extensive grounds which included a farm. The seminary was moved to Auckland in 1997 but many of its buildings remain and are used for Catholic as well as other purposes.

The significance of the area for transport grew in the 20th century when the proximity of the plain's flat land to Dunedin saw the establishment of the Taieri Aerodrome, just north of Mosgiel, in the late 1920s and the development of Momona Airport, now Dunedin International Airport, further south on the plain in 1962.

After the Second World War, some expected Mosgiel might industrialise extensively, like the Hutt Valley, but expansion remained limited. The bankruptcy of the woollen mill in 1980 and its eventual closure have not been offset by other industrial developments.

The late 20th century's increasingly ageing New Zealand population saw the expansion of housing for the elderly, with several retirement villages and communities located in the vicinity. In recent decades the hills above the plain have seen some division into lifestyle blocks. The 2003 completion of the Fairfield bypass shortened commuting-time via the southern motorway (part of State Highway 1) to the city centre.

Mosgiel's economy until recent years, focused on the manufacture of wool-products and many elderly New Zealanders still associate the word "Mosgiel" with the former Mosgiel Woollen Mills. Today, Mosgiel's income comes from many sources, including local shops, cafés and bars. It remains an important service-centre for the surrounding farming community. It also hosts one of New Zealand's largest agricultural research institutes, Invermay. Until recently the largest employer was Fisher & Paykel which manufactured DishDrawer dishwasher and ranges at their Mosgiel factory. The closure of this plant was announced in early 2008.

== Demographics ==
Mosgiel is described by Statistics New Zealand as a medium urban area, and covers 17.28 km^{2} (6.67 sq mi) and had an estimated population of 15,100 as of June 2025, with a population density of 874 people per km^{2}.

Historical population
Year	Pop.	±% p.a.
2006	11,649	—
2013	12,258	+0.73%
2018	13,635	+2.15%
2023	14,589	+1.36%

Before the 2023 census, Mosgiel had a smaller boundary, covering 16.96 km^{2} (6.55 sq mi). Using that boundary, Mosgiel had a population of 13,635 at the 2018 New Zealand census, an increase of 1,377 people (11.2%) since the 2013 census, and an increase of 1,986 people (17.0%) since the 2006 census. There were 5,805 households, comprising 6,348 males and 7,290 females, giving a sex ratio of 0.87 males per female, with 2,229 people (16.3%) aged under 15 years, 1,836 (13.5%) aged 15 to 29, 5,568 (40.8%) aged 30 to 64, and 3,999 (29.3%) aged 65 or older.

Ethnicities were 93.9% European/Pākehā, 6.8% Māori, 1.4% Pasifika, 2.6% Asian, and 2.0% other ethnicities. People may identify with more than one ethnicity.

The percentage of people born overseas was 11.7, compared with 27.1% nationally.

Although some people chose not to answer the census's question about religious affiliation, 50.1% had no religion, 40.7% were Christian, 0.1% had Māori religious beliefs, 0.4% were Hindu, 0.6% were Muslim, 0.2% were Buddhist and 1.1% had other religions.

Of those at least 15 years old, 1,566 (13.7%) people had a bachelor's or higher degree, and 3,123 (27.4%) people had no formal qualifications. 1,545 people (13.5%) earned over $70,000 compared to 17.2% nationally. The employment status of those at least 15 was that 4,764 (41.8%) people were employed full-time, 1,617 (14.2%) were part-time, and 252 (2.2%) were unemployed.

Individual statistical areas (2018 boundaries)
Name	Area (km^{2})	Population	Density (per km^{2})	Households	Median age	Median income
Bush Road	0.88	2,358	2,680	1,032	48.9 years	$25,400
Mosgiel East	3.34	2,730	817	1,182	57.0 years	$27,900
Mosgiel Central	1.24	2,607	2,102	1,236	52.4 years	$24,700
Seddon Park	1.56	2,868	1,638	1,254	48.3 years	$23,600
Wingatui	6.82	891	131	315	43.9 years	$38,700
East Taieri	3.12	2,181	699	786	44.8 years	$43,200
New Zealand					37.4 years	$31,800

== Points of interest ==
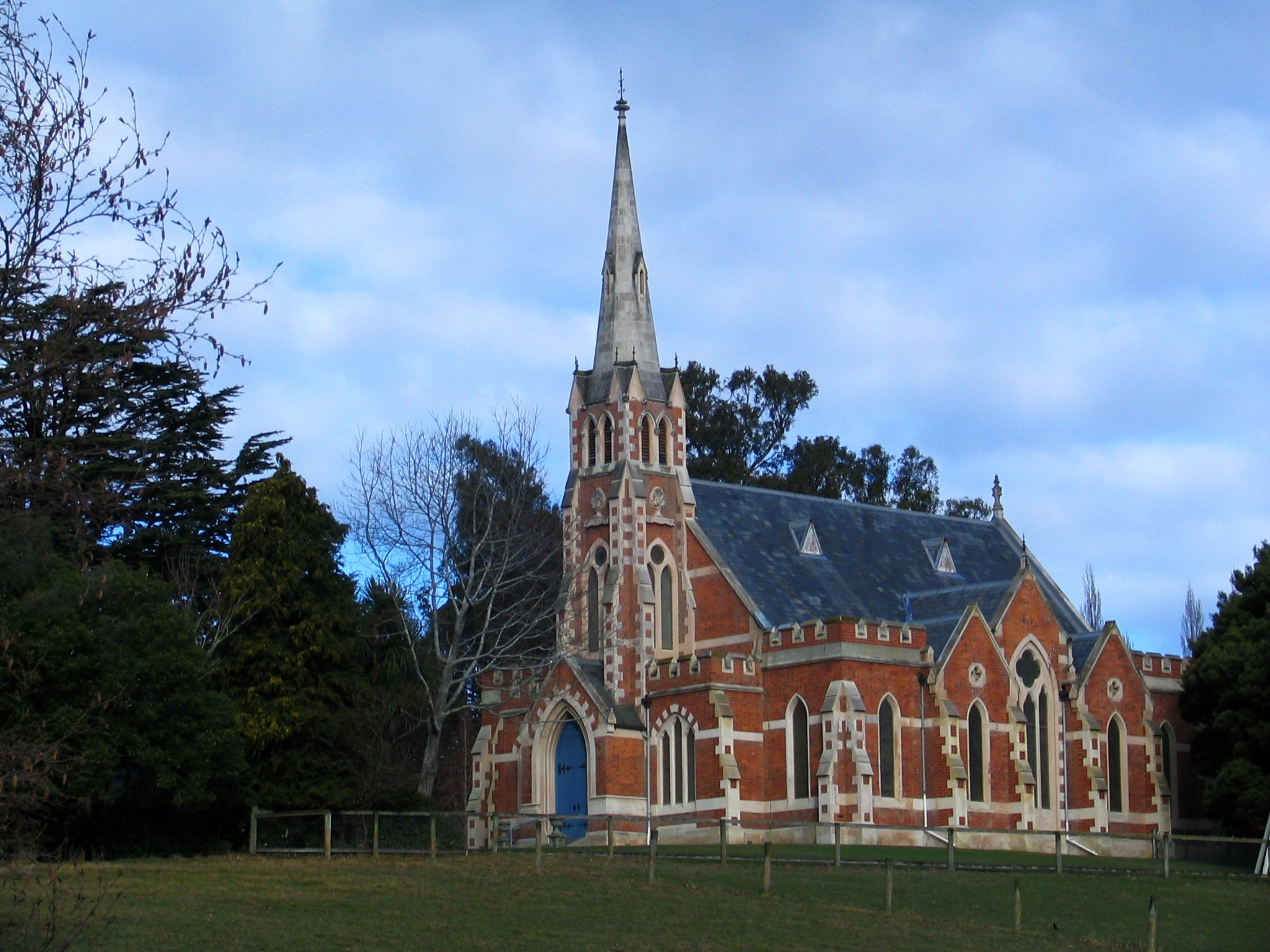
East Taieri Presbyterian Church

R.A. Lawson's East Taieri Presbyterian Church (1870) stands near the Mosgiel turnoff to State Highway 1.

The Mosgiel Woollen Mill built in 1871 in Factory Road, was the second woollen mill to open in New Zealand. The mill was integral to the town and a significant employer from when it opened until the end of the 20th century when it closed.

In 1936, while still a schoolboy, the artist Colin McCahon took part in a family outing, driving from the seaboard over the coastal hills. Looking across the Taieri Plain towards Central Otago he had what he described as a "vision", seeing a pre-Biblical "landscape of splendour order and peace" – which, he said, it became his life's work to communicate. The same view, though seen from a greater distance, had inspired Charles Kettle in the 1840s.

In 1953 the young Ralph Hotere, later to become one of New Zealand's best-regarded artists, qualified as a pilot on Tiger Moths at the Taieri Aerodrome Training School, Mosgiel.

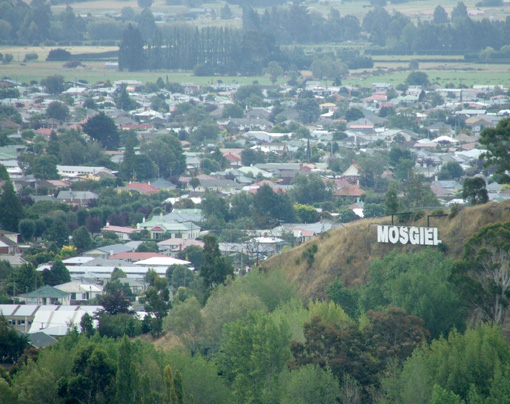
Mosgiel and "Mollywood" sign

Mosgiel's sign forms an unusual feature. Modelled on the famous Hollywood Sign, the seven letters of the Mosgiel sign perch on a hillside close to State Highway 1. Because of this sign locals sometimes (though not very often) jokingly refer to Mosgiel as "Mollywood".

The distinctive outline of Saddle Hill forms the eastern border of the greater Mosgiel area.

In recent years Mosgiel has experienced increased urbanisation and a growth in population. The revival has come about in part due to people moving from Dunedin's inner suburbs. Mosgiel has recently seen the opening or refurbishment of cafés and bars aimed at a younger market, and workers have built stages one and two of a planned larger playground.

In 2010 Mosgiel became home to the first Warehouse Local store, and a McDonald's restaurant was planned to go next to New World, however due to strict restrictions that would be imposed on the restaurant the idea has been scrapped.

== Education ==
Taieri College is the only state secondary school in Mosgiel. It caters for years 7 to 13 and has a roll of 1,198. The school was formed in 2004 as a merge between The Taieri High School and Mosgiel Intermediate. The Taieri High School was called Mosgiel District High School until 1956, and has origins from 1864.

East Taieri School, Elmgrove School, and Silverstream School are state contributing primary schools catering for years 1 to 6. They have rolls of 313, 300, and 315 students, respectively. East Taieri School was founded as a preaching station in 1853, and moved to its current location in 1863.

St Mary's School is a state-integrated Catholic full primary school for years 1 to 8 and has a roll of 132. The school started in 1882 and was run by the Sisters of Mercy from 1889.

Amana Christian School is a private composite school for years 1 to 13 and has a roll of 64. It opened in 2001.

All these schools are coeducational. Rolls are as of July 2026.

== Notable residents ==
- Frank W. Boreham - Baptist Preacher and author.
- Steve Hansen, KNZM – All Black head coach 2012 - 2019 World Cup Winner 2015.
- Barry Milburn – New Zealand test cricketer (wicketkeeper), local butcher.
- Michael McGarry – New Zealand footballer.
- Rowan Milburn – New Zealand and Netherlands women's cricket international.
- Geoffrey Orbell – New Zealand doctor, mostly recognised after he rediscovered the takahē, a bird previously thought to be extinct.
- Brad Thorn – All Black and Australian rugby league international.
- Ernest John "Midge" Didham – Jockey, won 1970 Melbourne Cup.
- Thomas Desmond Coughlan – 1958 All Black.
- Peter Johnstone – All Black 1949–51. Captain 1950–51. Local Rugby Ground named after him. Undefeated as All Black Captain. Named as one of five players of 1951, by NZ Rugby Almanac.
- Herbert Paul Sapsford – 1976 All Black v Argentina, local dentist.
- Andrew Joseph Francis Brown (known as Joe) – Entrepreneur, entertainment promoter. Franchise owner of Miss NZ Contest.
- Peter Renner – 1984 Summer Olympic representative (3,000m steeplechase), national and Oceania record holder (8.14.05) in 3,000m steeplechase.
- Kenneth Charles Bloxham – Otago and All Black representative
- Alister Hopkinson – All Black 1967–70. Played 35 matches for NZ, including 9 Tests.
- Jenny McDonald – NZ women's hockey player 1971–85. Captain 1980–85.
- Justin Ives – Rugby International for Japan 2011 – 2015.
- Roy Blair - NZ Roller skating Champion NZ Speed Ice Skating Champion Played one First Class game for Otago Cricket team. Father of NZ One Day International Bruce Blair, and Otago Representative Wayne Blair.
- Bruce Blair - Otago cricket representative NZ One Day International 14 Matches.
- Mary Cuddie - Early settler, farmer and shopkeeper.

== Climate ==
Climate data for Mosgiel (Invermay Edr) (1981–2010)
Month	Jan	Feb	Mar	Apr	May	Jun	Jul	Aug	Sep	Oct	Nov	Dec	Year
Mean daily maximum °C (°F)	20.1 (68.2)	19.4 (66.9)	18.1 (64.6)	15.8 (60.4)	12.9 (55.2)	10.3 (50.5)	10.0 (50.0)	11.5 (52.7)	13.7 (56.7)	15.2 (59.4)	16.9 (62.4)	18.2 (64.8)	15.2 (59.3)
Daily mean °C (°F)	14.9 (58.8)	14.4 (57.9)	12.9 (55.2)	10.5 (50.9)	8.1 (46.6)	5.8 (42.4)	5.3 (41.5)	6.8 (44.2)	8.8 (47.8)	10.1 (50.2)	11.8 (53.2)	13.4 (56.1)	10.2 (50.4)
Mean daily minimum °C (°F)	9.7 (49.5)	9.4 (48.9)	7.8 (46.0)	5.2 (41.4)	3.2 (37.8)	1.3 (34.3)	0.6 (33.1)	2.0 (35.6)	3.9 (39.0)	5.0 (41.0)	6.7 (44.1)	8.7 (47.7)	5.3 (41.5)
Average rainfall mm (inches)	82.3 (3.24)	83.8 (3.30)	90.1 (3.55)	43.7 (1.72)	67.8 (2.67)	58.2 (2.29)	70.7 (2.78)	61.3 (2.41)	54.3 (2.14)	68.5 (2.70)	54.1 (2.13)	81.7 (3.22)	816.5 (32.15)
Source: NIWA
