= Otago Association =

The Otago Association was founded in 1845 by adherents of the Free Church of Scotland with the purpose of establishing a colony of like-minded Scots in Otago in the South Island of New Zealand, chiefly at Dunedin.

In addition to religion, the economy was also a motivator in the association's foundation and operations. The Highland Clearances, crop failures, and population pressures in industrialised urban centres all created conditions that, by the mid-nineteenth century, made emigration seem attractive to many poorer Scots.

John McGlashan was the association's secretary in Edinburgh, Scotland, from 1847. He would himself emigrate in 1853. The first two settler ships, John Wickliffe and Philip Laing, under the command of William Cargill, sailed from Britain in late 1847 and arrived at what is now Port Chalmers on 23 March and 15 April 1848, respectively. About 12,000 immigrants arrived in Dunedin within a decade.

== See also ==
- Canterbury Association
- New Zealand Company
