= April 1865 Bruce by-election =

New Zealand by-election

- 8 April 1865
- Turnout: 180 (36.0%)
Candidate	Arthur John Burns	William John Dyer
Party	Independent	Independent
Popular vote	102	78
Percentage	56.67	43.33
MP before election
Thomas Gillies
Independent
Elected MP
Arthur John Burns
Independent

The April 1865 Bruce by-election was a New Zealand by-election held in the multi-member (Note: The New Zealand term of multi-member electorates is that they are electorates that have multiple representatives elected at the same time (except in the case of by-elections). Multi-member electorates in New Zealand had two or three members. At this time the Bruce electorate had two.) electorate of Bruce during the 3rd New Zealand Parliament on 8 April 1865. It was triggered on 9 January that year by the resignation of separationist Thomas Gillies and won by prominent settler Arthur John Burns. The more liberal businessman William John Dyer was the sole other contester of the by-election, finishing with 43.33% of the vote.

Five candidates were nominated but two of them had their nominations rejected by the Returning Officer. Both rejected nominees had nominated other electors earlier in the meeting; the Returning Officer believed this behaviour was childish and contrary to the "serious duty" of candidacy. A third nominee—Henry Clapcott—was proposed but withdrew prior to the election. The by-election was one of three by-elections in the electorate that were also in the 3rd Parliament, the others being the July 1865 by-election and the 1862 by-election. 11 months after the by-election came the 1866 election.

== Background ==
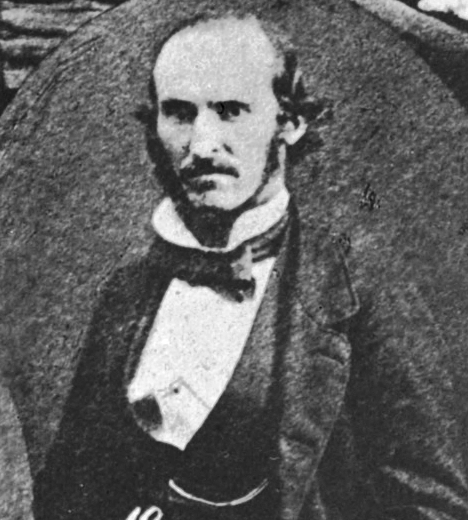
Thomas Gillies around 1860

Thomas Gillies was a cabinet minister in the Domett Ministry (August 1862) and then the Whitaker–Fox Ministry (October 1863 – November 1864), and had served as a Member of Parliament for Bruce since 1861. He was a strong advocate of the separation of the North and South islands, but did not get majority support in the ministries or from parliament as a whole, and he resigned his parliamentary seat in early 1865 as he could not achieve his goal. The question of separation was also not universally supported by his electorate. The first mention of Gillies having resigned came on 9 January 1865 and the resignation eventually took effect on 3 March that year.

His resignation eventually triggered the by-election. Some of the electors near Lake Wakatip—the contemporary spelling of Lake Wakatipu—were sorry to see Gillies retire because of "some infatuated idea in regard to separation". The loss of a 'suitable representative' generally displeased the electorate, including those who were against his views.

== Campaign ==
The Otago Daily Times's Tokomairiro correspondent reported on 23 March that a writ for the election of a replacement was issued, and that the dates for a nomination meeting and election were set for 31 March and 8 April, respectively. As of 23 March, no candidates had come forward and the newspaper stated that their reporters had not heard any rumours about potential candidates either. On the day prior to the nomination meeting, still no candidates had come forward, despite discussions of Frederick Moss as a suitable representative. Moss had declined becoming a candidate due to private engagements.

=== Nomination meeting ===
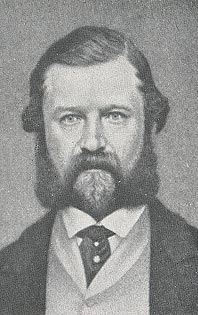
John Harris

The meeting for nominations for the by-election was held in the Tokomairiro Court House in Milton—which in those days was called Tokomairiro or Tokomairaro—on 31 March 1865. Up until two years previously, the Court House in Dunedin hosted the nomination meeting, and this was the first Bruce election with the nominations held in Tokomairiro. The Returning Officer John Dewe—having read the election notice and the writ—called upon the various electors to declare their nominations of candidates. The number of electors present was approximately 30, yet for a considerable time no elector announced their nomination.

Finally, John Hardy gave a speech in which he expressed his astonishment that despite Bruce being one of the most developed parliamentary constituencies, no candidate had yet been nominated by the electors. He then announced his nomination of Henry Clapcott, the Treasurer of Otago Province at the time, as a person who he thought would be a suitable representative for the electorate. M. B. Power seconded that nomination. Some speakers opposed Clapcott's nomination, as the provincial superintendent (John Hyde Harris) and the provincial speaker (John L. C. Richardson) were already members of the House of Representatives, and Clapcott as the third-ranked provincial executive member would leave an ineffective executive behind to run Otago.

E. Marryatt proposed William John Dyer, seconded pro forma by H. Clark. Before he announced his nomination, John Lillie Gillies signalled that he was about to propose someone who was well known among those who lived in the electorate. After a speech, Gillies announced his nomination and stated that he was sure that the electors could not find a more honest candidate than Arthur John Burns, who he then announced as the candidate he would like to propose. James Smith seconded that nomination.

No other candidates were proposed and the Returning Officer called for Dyer to give a speech to the electors regarding what he would advocate for and his goals if he became the Member of Parliament for Bruce. However, before Dyer made his speech John Hardy stepped in and asked if he could say some words as Henry Clapcott's representative, an action opposed by other electors. Hardy said that in reply to some observations by J. L. Gillies regarding the state of the province of Otago without a treasurer— he would then also like to nominate Marryatt—who himself had nominated someone. The observations were concerning the fact that Clapcott would be forced to resign as Treasurer to take up his role as MP for Bruce. Marryatt had opposed the stepping in of Hardy, without a clue that he would be nominated for the role. Laughingly, J. L. Gillies seconded that nomination. However, Gillies said that an elector may only nominate one person for a role at an election. The Returning Officer then justified that an elector may nominate as many people as they like. Returning the compliment, Marryatt nominated Hardy for the role, seconded by George E. Brown. However, the Returning Officer took no notice of the nominations, stating that it was immature of the electors to make a joke on such a serious duty. Multiple electors then said that some fun at an election was expected, a stance which the Returning Officer disagreed with.

After the interruption, Dyer came forward and delivered his speech. During his speech, Dyer explained that he was a separationist, though not to the extremes as some of the Separation League, a supporter of the elimination of the House of Representatives, and could see no reason why the Chinese could not come to New Zealand like any other people.

Burns said in his speech that he had no idea that he would be a candidate for the electorate, and therefore did not have enough time to prepare a speech, so he made it up along the way. He stated that if he became a Member of Parliament for Bruce, he would endeavour to act in a straightforward manner. In response to questions, Burns stated that he was an advocate for free trade. He also stated that he was against separationism, the act of dividing the North and South Islands, and that although he supported the use of income tax, he was against a stamp act or newspaper postage.

Henry Clapcott was not present at the nomination meeting.

After the speeches the Returning Officer called for a show of hands. The results were as follows:

Party	Name	Votes
Independent	Arthur John Burns	7
Independent	William John Dyer	4
Independent	Henry Clapcott	3

The Returning Officer then declared the results to be in favour of Burns. Supporters of Clapcott demanded an election on his behalf, which was held on 8 April 1865. According to reports, Burns was deemed the most likely candidate to win the by-election, an interpretation which turned out to be correct.

== Candidates ==
Party	Name	Notes
Independent	Arthur John Burns	A well-known person around the Otago Province, Burns had no idea that he would be chosen by the electors as a candidate. Burns was president of the Ayrshire Association of Otago.
Independent	William John Dyer	A separationist, Dyer was also a more left-wing candidate than Burns.
Independent	Henry Clapcott	Clapcott was the Treasurer of the Otago Province. On 5 April 1865 it was announced by the Otago Daily Times that Clapcott had withdrawn his candidacy for the seat.

== Election and results ==
The election was held on 8 April 1865. Clapcott placed an advertisement on 5 April in the Otago Daily Times stating that he had withdrawn from the contest for the seat.

April 1865 Bruce by-election
Party	Candidate	Votes	%	±%
Independent	Arthur John Burns	102	56.67	
Independent	William John Dyer	78	43.33	
Majority		24	13.33	
Turnout		180	36.00	
Registered electors		500		

It was not possible to announce the results before the afternoon of 11 April 1865, and they were announced on 12 April. Burns won the election, as expected, although with just 24 votes (13.34%) over his sole opponent, Dyer. As the candidate who got a plurality of the votes, Burns was officially declared by the Returning Officer John Dewe as the new Member of Parliament for the electorate on 12 April 1865.

=== Results by polling booth ===
There were eight polling booths, and this was an increase by five since the last election held. The new booths were located at three school houses, in Waihola, Lawrence, and Inch Clutha, at the station of Captain Francis Wallace Mackenzie in Pomahaka, and at the courthouse in Dunedin. The latter booth was located outside of the electorate, but many of the electors resided in Dunedin. (Note: At the time, suffrage was linked to property ownership.) The polling booths that remained the same as at the 1862 by-election were the Court House at Tokomairiro (the place where the nomination meeting was held), and at the schoolhouses in Warepa and East Taieri. At the polling booth of East Taieri, four people voted whose names were not included on the electoral roll. Those votes were not included in the official count. Despite there being 280 electors enrolled in Tokomairiro, only 65 (23.2%) of them cast a vote in the by-election, a statistic that could have changed the election. The following table shows detailed results.

Polling booth	Burns	Dyer	Total
Tokomairiro	22	43	65
East Taieri	39	4	43
Waihola	14	19	33
Dunedin	15	8	23
Inch Clutha	7	2	9
Lawrence	4	2	6
Warepa	1	0	1
Pomahaka	0	0	0
Total	102	78	180

== Aftermath ==
On 11 January 1865 there was a meeting of the Separation League, in which J. H. Harris was elected president and T. B. Gillies, whose resignation of the seat caused the by-election, deputy president. Burns lasted as a representative for Bruce until the 7 March 1866 election when it was transformed into a single-member electorate. That election was won by John Cargill—who had contested the previous election—unopposed.

== Citations ==
- Cyclopedia Company (1905). "Pomahaka". The Cyclopedia of New Zealand : Otago & Southland Provincial Districts. Christchurch: Cyclopedia Company, Limited – via The New Zealand Electronic Text Collection.
- Cyclopedia Company (1905). "Warepa". The Cyclopedia of New Zealand : Otago & Southland Provincial Districts. Christchurch: Cyclopedia Company, Limited – via The New Zealand Electronic Text Collection.
- McRobie, Alan (1989). Electoral Atlas of New Zealand. Wellington: GP Books. ISBN 0-477-01384-8.
- Scholefield, Guy (1940). Dictionary of New Zealand Biography A–L (PDF). Wellington: Dictionary of New Zealand Biography.
- Wilson, Jim (1985) [First published in 1913]. New Zealand Parliamentary Record, 1840–1984 (4th ed.). Wellington: V.R. Ward, Govt. Printer. OCLC 154283103.
