= Bruce Blair =

Bruce Blair may refer to:

- Bruce Blair (cricketer) (born 1957), New Zealand former cricketer
- Bruce G. Blair (1947–2020), American nuclear security expert
