= John McGlashan =

John McGlashan may refer to:

- John McGlashan (politician) (1802–1864), New Zealand lawyer, politician and educationalist
  - John McGlashan College, boarding school for boys in Dunedin, New Zealand, named for the above
- John McGlashan (footballer) (1967–2018), Scottish football player and manager
- John Glashan (born John McGlashan, 1927–1999), Scottish cartoonist, illustrator and playwright
