= Mr Yipadee =

New Zealand children's musician

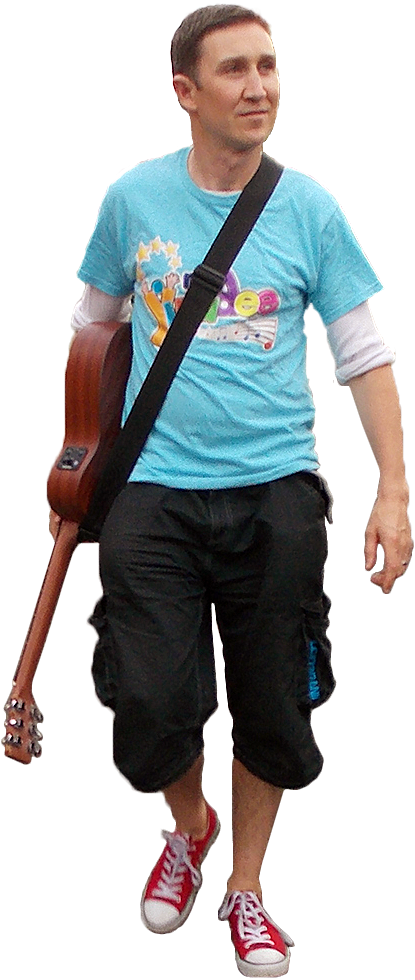
- Born: Dean O'Brien; 2 September 1978 (age 48)
- Other name: Deano Yipadee
- Known for: Children's musician, producer, and author
- Website: www.yipadee.com

Dean O'Brien, known by his stage name Mr Yipadee or Deano Yipadee, is a children's author, musician, and producer, who has performed in New Zealand, Australia and the United Kingdom.

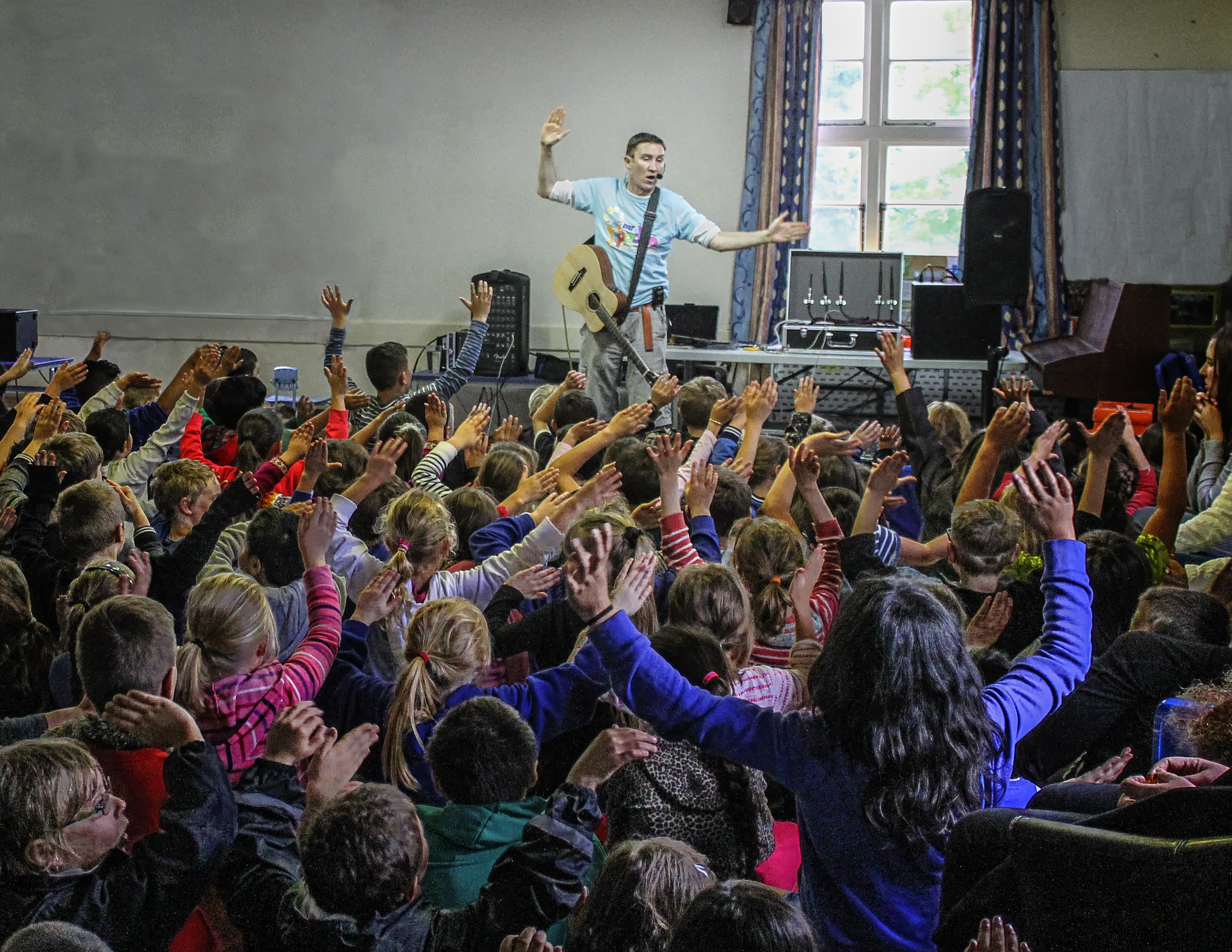
Deano Yipadee aka Mr Yipadee aka Deano O'Brien and crowd

== Early life ==
O'Brien was raised in Mosgiel, New Zealand, where he was educated at St Mary's Catholic primary school and Taieri High School. He became interested in performing music from an early age, and he played guitar in a number of bands in school. He also spent a year in Japan teaching English through music to young children. He began working in radio, initially for More FM in New Zealand, and then for 6 years on breakfast shows in Manchester, Liverpool, and Lancashire in England. He then spent over 4 years as the Programme Director for a radio station in Manchester, England. He was made redundant in 2012.

It was reported (incorrectly) in the Sydney Morning Herald after his Debut album went to Number One in the UK that O'Brien is from Melbourne, Australia.

== Music career ==
After being made redundant, O'Brien decided to pursue a career writing and performing children's music, using the stage name Mr Yipadee. His music is intended to promote positive thinking and self-confidence among children. His first performances were at birthday parties and children's play centres near his home in Preston, England.

He has released four albums under the name Mr Yipadee, The Animal Choir, about a mouse starting a choir, The Yes I Can Club., "Positively Nursery Rhymes", and World's Greatest Christmas Party. Yes I Can Club charted at number one on the iTunes Children's Best Sellers Chart in the UK when it was released. and World's Greatest Christmas was at number two on the Best Sellers Chart in December 2014.

In 2013, Mr Yipadee performed on the Kidz Field stage at Glastonbury Festival. After his performance, his debut album The Animal Choir peaked at number one on the iTunes children's chart. In September and October 2013, he toured New Zealand with fellow children's entertainer Craig Smith. He has also toured the UK between 2013 and 2016 with CBeebies presenter, Alex Winters., CBeebies TV actor, Joe Chambers who plays First Officer Ditti on CBeebies TV Show, The Rhyme Rocket, Let's Play (CBeebies) presenter Rebecca Keatley and Cat Sandion

In 2015. O'Brien organised a dozen TV Stars to create an album called "Sing Along For Syria, this album included kids to stars from CBeebies, CITV, CBBC, and a star from iTV's Coronation Street.

== Author career ==
In 2016, under the name Deano Yipadee, O'Brien's first children's book Jingle Bells, Rudolph Smells was released by publishing house Scholastic. and debuted at number one on the best sellers children's charts and although it was only released in the last quarter of 2016 was number five in overall 2016 New Zealand Children's books best sellers list. It also reached the top 10 of all genre of books in Australia in the Collins Booksellers Best Sellers List in 2017. This book was taken from the song Smelly Christmas. This song was on the World's Greatest Christmas Party album that went to number two on the UK children's charts. "Jingle Bells, Rudolph Smells" is illustrated by Paul Beavis and Gruffalo's Alex Scheffler.

Deano Yipadee's second book, Nee Naw The Little Fire Engine, debuted in the top 3 in the best sellers charts in the first week of February. It remained in the top 10 for over three months and also made the Collins Booksellers Top 10 Best Sellers List in September 2017.

His third book, Stink-o-saurus, reached the top 3 in the best sellers charts in October and November 2017. and also topped the Collins Booksellers Top 10 Best Sellers List in Australia.

In 2018, Deano Yipadee has had three books in the top 5 in the same weeks in the Collins Booksellers Australian Best Sellers Charts in March and The New Zealand best sellers charts in April.

In 2019, Deano Yipadee had his books released in 21 countries by Scholastic Asia, Scholastic Canada, Scholastic UK and New Frontier publishing.

In 2020, Deano released the third book in the Scholastic bestselling book series Nee Naw The Little Fire Engine, called Nee Naw Goes Bananas.

In 2021, Deano released two books with Scholastic. The first in April was 'Nee Naw And Friends - Ellie Copter', the fourth book in the Nee Naw The Little Fire Engine Series and the first that introduces a helicopter called Ellie. Ellie Copter spent three months in the top 10 of the Children & Teens Best Sellers Charts. The second book, Jingle Bells, What's That Smell, was released in October and spent two months in the top 10 of the Children And Teens best sellers charts in the weeks leading up to Christmas, 2021.

In 2022, Deano released a book called Granny's Undies with Scholastic and illustrator, Carla Martell.

In 2023, Deano released a new book in the best-selling Nee Naw series called Dusty the Digger. The voice of the character Dusty that sings on the song with Deano is host of Dancing With The Starts NZ, Sharyn Casey. The voices of Plinky and Plinky the silly billy goats on this song are sung by Bryce and Rog from The Rock's breakfast show, The Morning Rumble.

In April 2023, Nee Naw The Little Fire Engine was featured vs Wonky Donkey and The Little Yellow Digger on TVNZ's Lego Masters (TV2). Series 2 Episode 8 had contestants making one of those three iconic New Zealand children's books characters (TV2).

In May 2023, Deano had four books in the Nielsen NZ Children And Teens (Official) Best-sellers Charts with Ellie Copter - Nee Naw And Friends at number one, Nee Naw the Little Fire Engine at number three, Nee Naw Goes Bananas at number five and Nee Naw And The Cowtastrophe at number seven.

In June 2023, Deano had 50% of the books in the official bestseller charts in the same week. According to Kete Books, this is a New Zealand first with five books in the Neilson NZ Children and Teens (Official) Best-sellers Charts. Dusty the Digger at number one, Stink-o-saurus at number five, Nee Naw the Little Fire Engine at number seven, Ellie Copter at number nine and Granny's Undies at number ten.

In June 2023, Deano Yipadee released a new book called Dusty the Digger - Nee Naw and Friends. This debuted at number one in the Nielsen NZ Children and Teens (Official) Best-sellers Charts.

In June 2024, Deano Yipadee released a book called Moto Mike the Motorbike - Nee Naw and Friends. This debuted in the Nielsen NZ Children and Teens (Official) Best-sellers Charts at number one and stayed there for three months. In 2025 it has had continued chart placements and in May was at number two, with Toot the Tow Truk at number three and Elle Copter at number seven all in the same week

In June 2025, Deano Yipadee released a book called Toot the Tow Truck - Nee Naw and Friends. This debuted in the Nielsen NZ Children and Teens (Official) Best-sellers Charts at number one and stayed in the top ten for three months. The song, released on many music and video streaming platforms, features Jono Pryor from the TV and Radio Show, Jono and Ben as the voice of Toot the Tow Truck alongside Deano Ypadee's daughters, Ellie and Jett Yipadee.

== Personal life ==
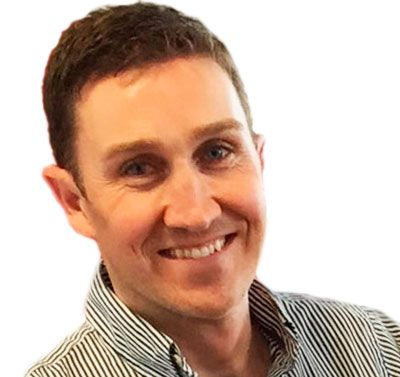

O'Brien married Lani in Wānaka in February 2010. They have two daughters: Evolet, who was born in 2012, and Ellora, who was born in 2015. They currently live part of the year in Dunedin, New Zealand and part of the year in Queensland, Australia.
