= July 1865 Bruce by-election =

New Zealand by-election

- 26 July 1865
- Turnout: 241 (48.2%)
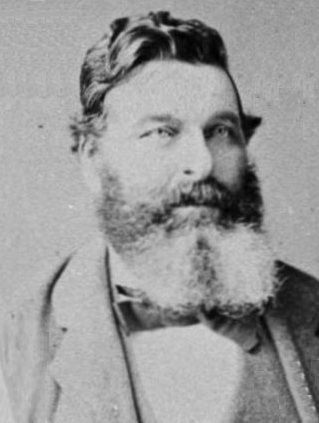

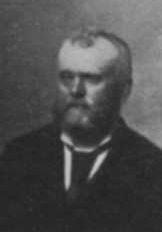
Candidate	James Macandrew	John Cargill
Party	Independent	Independent
Popular vote	207	34
Percentage	85.89	14.11
MP before election
Edward Cargill
Independent
Elected MP
James Macandrew
Independent

The July 1865 Bruce by-election was a New Zealand by-election held in the electorate of Bruce during the 3rd New Zealand Parliament on 27 July 1865 triggered by the resignation of Edward Cargill. Three candidates were nominated but one of them withdrew during the nomination meeting. James Macandrew was the successful candidate; he defeated John Cargill, a former Member of Parliament and a brother of the incumbent.

== Background ==
A large meeting was held on Saturday, 8 July, to discuss who should contest the superintendency election, and who could represent the Bruce electorate in parliament. On the latter question, John Cargill and William John Dyer were discussed as candidates. There was concern about John Cargill's suitability as their representative, and the meeting finished with passing the following resolution unanimously:

That this meeting does not consider Mr. John Cargill a suitable person to represent Bruce, and request Mr. W. J. Dyer to offer himself as a candidate for the representation of the County.

== Election results ==
July 1865 Bruce by-election
Party	Candidate	Votes	%	±%
Independent	James Macandrew	207	85.89	
Independent	John Cargill	34	14.11	
Majority		173	71.78	
Turnout		241	48.20	
Registered electors		500		

=== Results by polling booth ===
The polling booths were the same as those used in the April election.

Polling booth	Macandrew	Cargill	Total
Tokomairiro	72	14	86
Waihola	44	3	47
East Taieri	35	5	40
Dunedin	26	9	35
Inch Clutha	15	1	16
Warepa	11	0	11
Lawrence	3	1	4
Pomahaka	1	1	2
Total	207	34	241

== Citations ==
- Cyclopedia Company Limited (1905). The Cyclopedia of New Zealand : Otago & Southland Provincial Districts. Christchurch: The Cyclopedia of New Zealand.
- Wilson, Jim (1985) [First published in 1913]. New Zealand Parliamentary Record, 1840–1984 (4th ed.). Wellington: V.R. Ward, Govt. Printer. OCLC 154283103.
