= Wayne Blair =

Wayne Blair may refer to:

- Wayne Blair (cricketer) (1948–2019), New Zealand cricketer
- Wayne Blair (director) (born 1971), Australian writer, actor and director
