= Henry Clapcott =

New Zealand businessman and politician

Henry Clapcott (28 November 1830 – 19 September 1897) was a New Zealand businessman and politician.

== Early life ==
Clapcott was born on 28 November and baptised 22 December 1830 in Tarrant Keyneston, Dorset, England, the fourth son of George Bunter Clapcott and Eliza Bestland. After attending Westminster School in London, he was admitted to Trinity College, Cambridge in 1849, graduating with a B.A. in 1853. He trained for the church. He travelled to Otago, New Zealand, on the Carnatic in 1853 with his brother, Frederick Bunter Clapcott. At first, he was farming in the Popotunoa Gorge near Clinton.

== Career ==
In the week preceding 19 July 1862, Clapcott had been appointed as a Justice of the Peace for the Otago Province. On 10 December 1864 it was announced that Clapcott had become one of the trustees of the Dunedin Savings Bank along with William Mason, after the resignation of T. S. Forsaith and the leaving of the country by George Duncan.

Clapcott was elected to the Otago Provincial Council on 14 April 1864 in the Wakatipu electorate. A month later on 17 May, he joined the Otago Executive Council as their treasurer, and remained in that role until 18 April 1865 when the executive led by James Paterson resigned over a lost no-confidence vote. He originally had his name forward as a candidate at the April 1865 Bruce parliamentary by-election, but supporters of him withdrew his nomination three days before the election. Clapcott was briefly a candidate for the August 1865 Otago superintendency election, but retired prior to the election in favour of Thomas Dick, who was eventually the successful candidate. Clapcott resigned from the provincial council on 16 August 1865; it was rumoured that this was brought about by a mixture of personal affairs, and the mocking he received while standing for the role as superintendent. He afterwards withdrew from public life.

== Family ==
Clapcott married Mary Jane Power in 1858. She gave birth to a son on 27 October 1859, but she died a week later on 4 November and on 13 November, the baby died, too.

On 18 January 1862, he married Annie Harriet Bedborough at Dunedin. In July 1874, they lost a son aged 17 months. They had a daughter on 21 August 1875. Clapcott died, aged 67, on 19 September 1897 in Newington, Dunedin, which is today part of the suburb of Maori Hill. His wife died five weeks later of Bright's disease. The family members share a grave at the Dunedin Southern Cemetery.
