= Thomas Burns (minister, born 1796) =

Early Scottish settler and religious leader of Otago, New Zealand

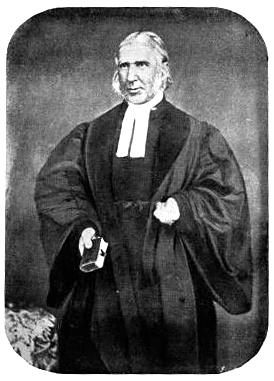

Personal details
- Born: 10 April 1796 Mauchline, Ayrshire, Scotland
- Died: 23 January 1871 (aged 74) Dunedin, New Zealand

minister of Ballantrae
- In office 13 April 1826 – 18 May 1830

minister of Monkton Parish Church
- In office 18 May 1830 – 18 May 1843

minister of Monkton Free Church
- In office 18 May 1843 – 25 June 1846

minister of Portobello Free Church
- In office 25 June 1846 – 1847

minister at Otago
- In office 1847–1870

first Chancellor of Otago University
- In office 1869–1870

Thomas Burns (10 April 1796 – 23 January 1871) was a prominent Scottish early European settler and religious leader of the province of Otago in New Zealand.

== Early life ==
Thomas Burns was born at Mossgiel, Mauchline, on 10 April 1796. He was the third son of estate manager Gilbert Burns and Jean Breckenridge, and nephew of Robert Burns. In his childhood Thomas attended Haddington Grammar School (where Edward Irving was his teacher) and then the University of Edinburgh, where he studied theology. He was employed as a tutor in the family of Sir Hew Dalrymple, of North Berwick before being was ordained as minister of the parish of Ballantrae on 13 April 1826. From Ballantrae he was translated to the parish of Monkton, Ayrshire, on 18 May 1830. In 1830 he married Clementina Grant, the daughter of an episcopal minister in Edinburgh. The couple lived in Monkton, where Clementina's uncle had been Presbyterian minister. He moved to the Free Church, Portobello, on 25 June 1846. In 1847 he left for Otago, New Zealand, where he was from 1848 to 1854 the sole minister of the Scottish colonists.

== Move to Dunedin ==
With his family, he joined at Greenock the Philip Laing, under the command of Captain Andrew Elles, which, with the John Wickliff, appointed to sail from London, had been chartered to convey the first emigrants to Otago. These vessels left their respective ports on November 27, 1847. The John Wickliff reached Port Chalmers on March 23, 1848, and the Philip Laing on April 15 following. The day after the arrival of the Philip Laing being the Sabbath, the passengers on both ships assembled on board the Philip Laing for Divine service, which was conducted by Mr. Burns. On the following Sabbath Divine service was held in Dunedin, when Mr. Burns preached. From that time to February 1854 Mr. Burns continued alone to minister to the religious needs of the settlers, the majority of whom had located themselves in Dunedin and neighbourhood, while some had settled at Port Chalmers, and others had taken up land in the Taieri, Tokomairiro, and Clutha districts, all of whom were periodically visited by Mr. Burns. From his ministerial visits southwards Mr. Burns was relieved by the arrival, in February 1854, of the Rev. William Will and the Rev. William Bannerman, with whom he took part in constituting the Presbytery of Otago in June following, and of which he was the first Moderator. Further relief was given him by the settlement of Rev. William Johnstone, at Port Chalmers, in June 1858, and by the subdivision of the Free Church, Dunedin, by the formation of Knox Church, under the pastorate of the Rev. D. M. Stuart, in 1860.

In 1861 Mr. Burns received the diploma of Doctor of Divinity from the University of Edinburgh. In 1866, on the formation of the synod as the Supreme Court of the Church, rendered necessary by the increase of ministers throughout Otago and Southland, and the formation of several presbyteries, Dr. Burns presided as first Moderator.

== Final years ==
Advancing years and failing health led to the appointment of a colleague and successor in the person of the Rev. George Sutherland in 1868. Towards the close of 1870 Dr. Burns retired wholly from public duties.

== Death and legacy ==
Burns died on 23 January 1871. A monument to his memory has been erected in Dunedin, not far from the spot where one of his illustrious uncle Robert Burns has stood for some years past. Whilst Captain Cargill was the lay organiser and ruler of the Otago settlement, the late Dr. Burns was its spiritual guide and adviser. It was in 1844 that the New Zealand Company, perceiving the wonderful life which animated the free Church, approached her with a view to found a Free Church colony in New Zealand. The offer was entertained, and the Laymen's Association for planting the colony of Otago was organised, with Dr. Alcorn for its secretary in Glasgow and Mr. John M'Glashan for its secretary in Edinburgh. The Association, with the utmost unanimity, fixed on Captain Cargill to be the Moses and Dr. Burns to be the Aaron of the enterprise, as Dr. Stuart phrased it. It is well known that Sir William Chambers was one of those who directed attention to Dr. Burns as in all respects suitable for the office of pioneer minister. The doctor devoted much time to the advocacy of the scheme, and in his speeches he gave prominence to its objects—the settlement of the people on their own acres and the planting of church and school within their reach.

At the age of 47, Burns joined the Free Church secession from the Church of Scotland. The proposal for a Free Church settlement in New Zealand gained Burns's interest, and he was offered the position of minister of the New Edinburgh scheme (later the Otago scheme) in June 1843. Burns and William Cargill established a lay association to promote the settlement in May 1845.

On 27 November 1847, Burns and 239 settlers sailed on the Philip Laing from Greenock, among them his wife, five daughters, and one son, Arthur John Burns. Among the 239 settlers was Mary Cuddie. They arrived at the new settlement of Dunedin on 15 April 1848. He knew farming skills from his childhood and upbringing, and established a farm at Andersons Bay on Otago Harbour, which he named Grants Brae, after a house in which his father had lived in Ayrshire.

He was a strict but practical man in the early days of the new settlement. A firm and devout churchman, Burns created a strong Presbyterian church as a cornerstone of the new settlement. He presided over the setting up of the Synod of Otago and Southland in 1866, and established the presbyteries of Dunedin, Clutha and Southland. A strong supporter of education, he helped establish both Otago Boys' High School and Otago Girls' High School during the 1860s, and was on the founding committee of the University of Otago, of which he was first Chancellor from 1869 until his death on 23 January 1871.

== Death ==
He is buried in Dunedin Southern Cemetery. His wife Clementina survived him by seven years.

== Family ==
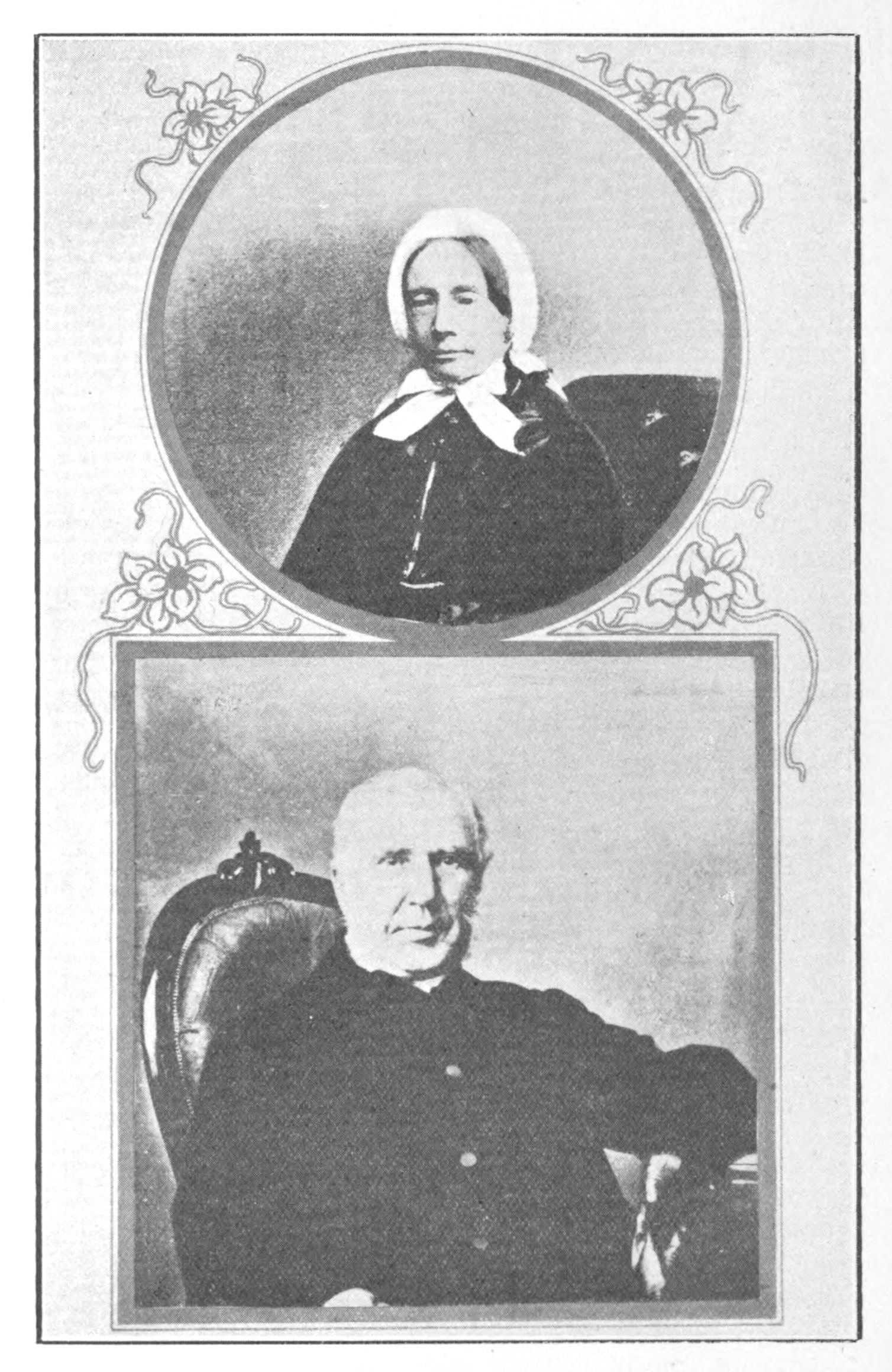
Mr. and Mrs. Thomas Burns, 1848

He married 4 January 1830, Clementina (died 19 July 1878), daughter of James Francis Grant, rector of Merston, Sussex, and niece of John Steel Outerson, and had issue—

- Arthur John, born 22 October 1830
- Clementina, born 24 July 1832 (married 14 June 1848, A. J. Ellis, Collector of Customs)
- Jane, born 23 January 1835 (married 21 May 1856, William Bannerman, minister of Presbyterian Church, Tokomairiro and Clutha, New Zealand)
- Ann, born 25 June, and died 1 Dec. 1837
- Annie, born 20 July 1839 (married Henry Livingstone)
- Frances, born 25 October 1841 (married Alexander Livingston)
- Agnes
- Isabella (married Alexander Stevenson, Dunedin).

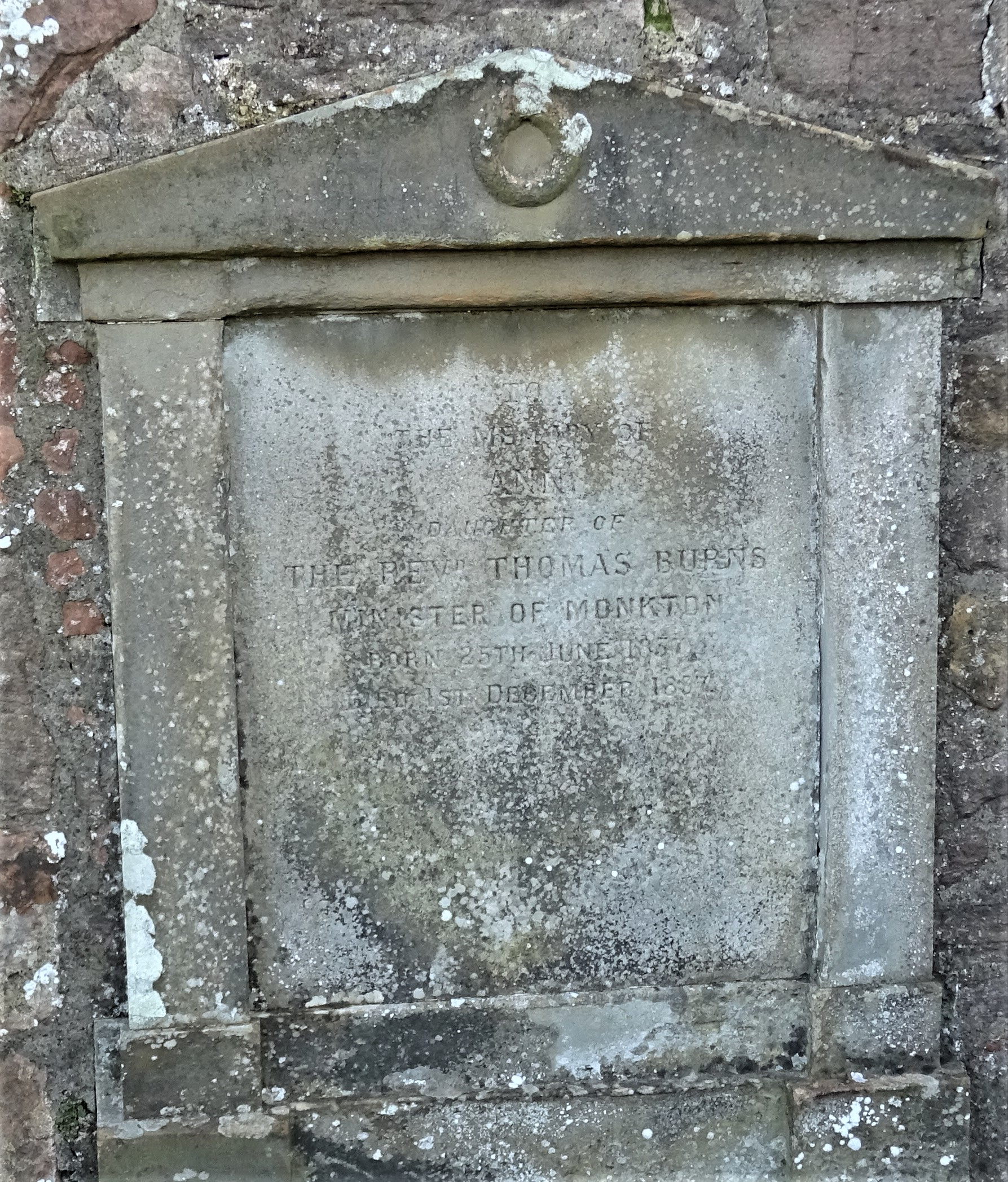
Anne Burns, baby daughter of Thomas Burns

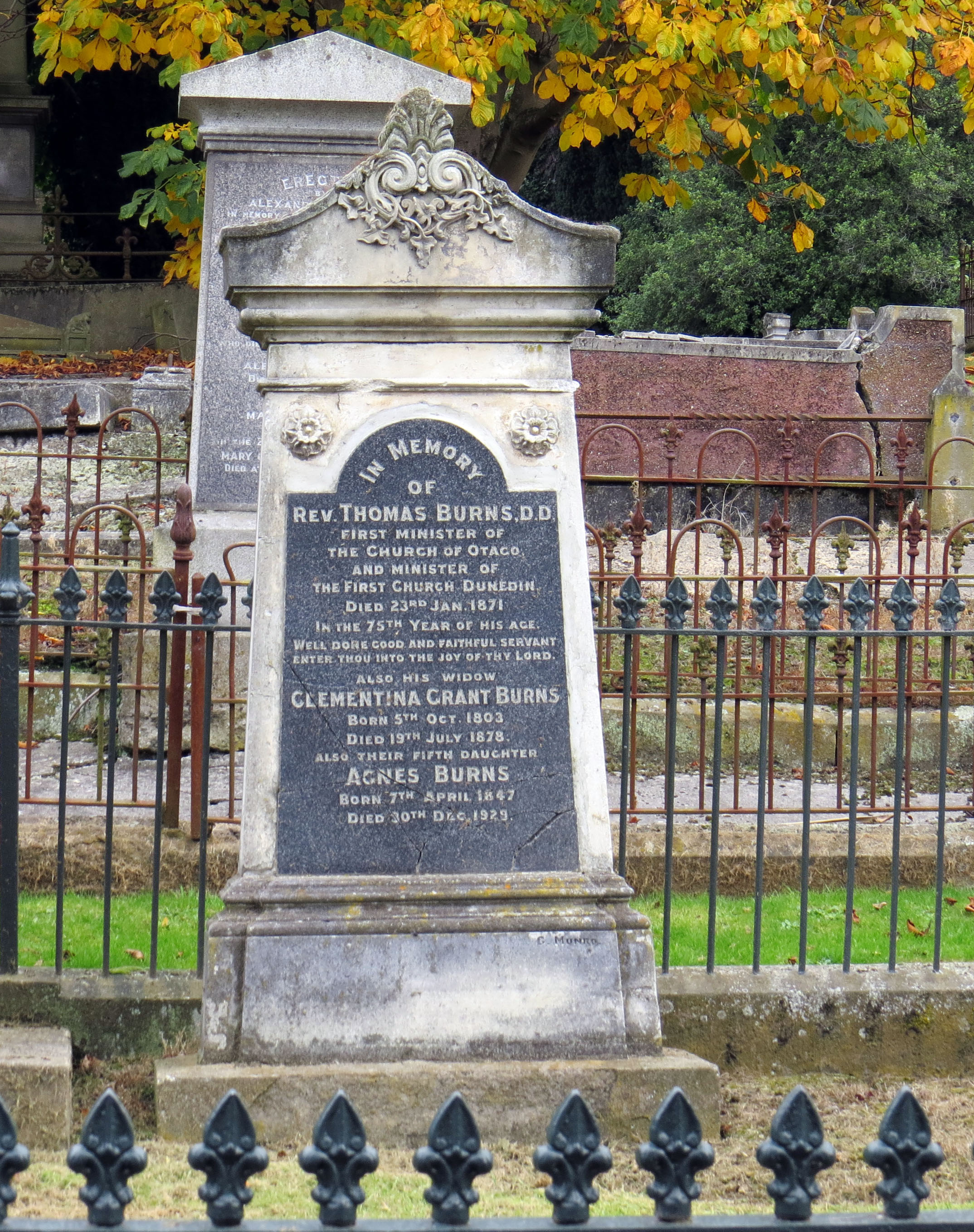
Thomas Burns's tomb in Dunedin Southern Cemetery
