= Alister Hopkinson =

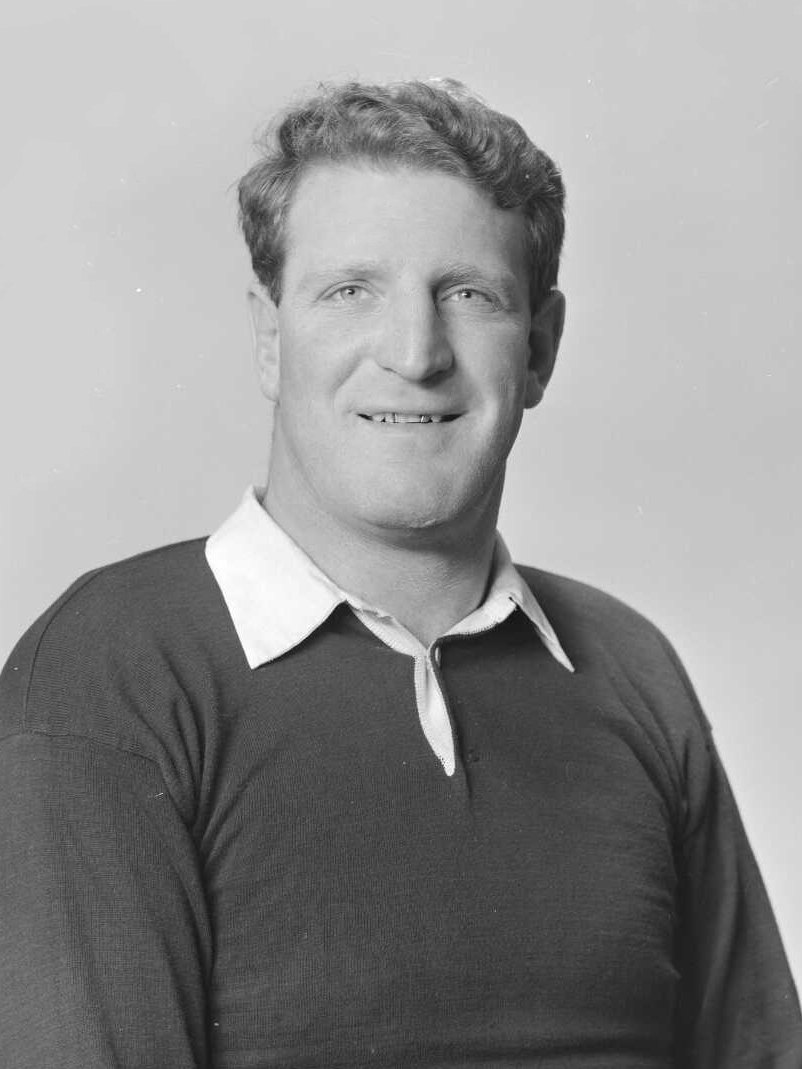
- Born: Alister Ernest Hopkinson; 30 May 1941 Mosgiel, New Zealand
- Died: 17 January 1999 (aged 57) Christchurch, New Zealand
- Height: 1.89 m (6 ft 2 in)
- Weight: 103 kg (227 lb)
- School: South Otago High School
- Occupation(s): Stock and station agent

Rugby union career
- Position: Prop
Provincial / State sides
Years	Team	Apps	(Points)
1962	South Canterbury	8	
1963–72	Canterbury	92	
International career
Years	Team	Apps	(Points)
1967–70	New Zealand	9	(0)
Coaching career
- Years: Team
- 1992: Canterbury

Alister Ernest Hopkinson (30 May 1941 – 17 January 1999) was a New Zealand rugby union player. A prop, Hopkinson represented South Canterbury and Canterbury at a provincial level, and was a member of the New Zealand national side, the All Blacks, from 1967 to 1970. He played 35 matches for the All Blacks including nine internationals. He went on to coach the Canterbury team in 1992. Hopkinson died of cancer in 1999.
