= Mary Cuddie =

New Zealand farmwife, midwife, and shopkeeper

Mary Cuddie (1823–1889) was a New Zealand farmwife, midwife and shopkeeper.

== Biography ==
She was born in Maybole, Ayrshire, Scotland on 1823. She moved to New Zealand following Thomas Burns, eventually settling in Saddle Hill. With her sons, she opened a general store in Mosgiel.
