= Taieri College =

Location
- 3 Green St, Mosgiel 9024; New Zealand; 45.875818°S 170.352083°E

Information
- Type: Co-ed state secondary, year 7–13
- Motto: "Transforming student's lives"
- Established: 2004
- Ministry of Education Institution no.: 495
- Principal: David Hunter
- Enrolment: 1,198 (July 2026)
- Socio-economic decile: 7O
- Website: taieri.school.nz

Taieri College, formerly called The Taieri High School and, prior to 1956, the Mosgiel District High School, is a co-educational state school in Mosgiel, Dunedin, New Zealand.

In 2003 a review of the schools on the Taieri Plains by the New Zealand Ministry of Education proposed that the high school would merge with Mosgiel Intermediate School (est. 1973) to become Taieri College from 2004. Because of this merger, ready-made classrooms were built for the intermediate students, as well as a second technology block. The roll expanded to over 800 in its first year, compared with the former high school's number of under 650 students, and now has 1090 students in 2018.

== Classrooms ==
In 2005 it was announced that more classrooms were to be built as well as refurbishment of present classroom blocks. In 2006 the roll exceeded 1000, making it one of Otago's largest schools. Zoning has been proposed to cap or maintain future numbers, as classroom space is becoming limited, even though a new two-storey classroom block, G block, has been completed.

== Enrolment ==
As of July 2026, the school has a roll of 1,198 students, of which 198 (16.5%) identify as Māori.

As of 2026, the school has an Equity Index of 459, placing it amongst schools whose students have average socioeconomic barriers to achievement (roughly equivalent to deciles 5 and 6 under the former socio-economic decile system).

== Notable alumni ==
- Geoff Bascand – Deputy Governor and Head of Operations at the Reserve Bank of NZ 2013
- Ian Foster – Assistant All Black Coach World Cup Winner 2015. All Black Head Coach Dec 2019
- Adam Hall (alpine skier) – Winter Paralympic Games Gold Medallist 2010, 2018. Bronze also in 2018, Silver Medallist 2026.
- Steve Hansen (KNZM) – All Black Head Coach 2012 – 2019 World Cup Winner 2015
- David Hunter – Played sixteen first class matches for Otago Cricket Team. Appointed Principal of Taieri College 2013
- Colin James – political journalist
- Peter Johnstone – All Black, 1949 -51. Undefeated as NZ Captain. Taieri Club ground is named after him
- Michael McGarry – All White. Capped 54 times. 12 Goals. 1986 – 1997
- Alan Mark – professor at Otago University (botany) and environmentalist
- Barry Milburn – NZ Test cricket wicketkeeper in 1969
- Dean O'Brien aka "Mr Yipadee" – Children's entertainer, author and musician
- Bob Reid – Drummer with band, The Knobz
- Janine Southby (nee Brown) – Former head coach of the Silver Ferns, New Zealand's national netball team
