= 1859 Town of Dunedin by-election =

New Zealand by-election

The 1859 Town of Dunedin by-election was a New Zealand by-election held in the single-member electorate of Town of Dunedin during the 2nd New Zealand Parliament on 14 January 1859, after the resignation of James Macandrew. The election was won by Macandrew, who had resigned from his seat on 2 November 1858 as a result of not attending a parliamentary session earlier in his term.

== Background ==
Macandrew had forfeited his seat on 2 November 1858 after his not attending of a session of parliament earlier in his term. It was said by the Otago Witness to be a remarkable fact that out of all the Members of Parliament that didn't attend that session of parliament, Macandrew was the only one to have resigned from his seat due to that.

== Overview ==
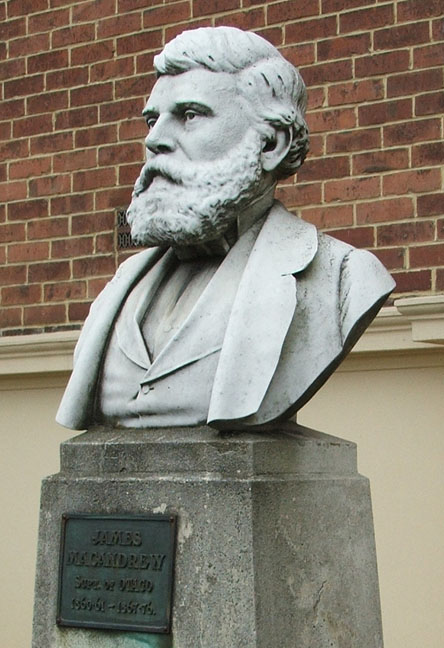
Bust of James Macandrew outside Otago Settlers Museum, Dunedin

A nomination meeting was held in the Mechanics' Institute on 12 January 1859. The Returning Officer gave a speech reminding the electors of the duty they were to perform. Mr. Shaw proposed Mr. James G. S. Grant, a nomination seconded by Mr. Carnegie. However, the proposal of Grant was not unanimous, with Mr. G. Smith, seconded by James Kilgour, proposing Mr. James Macandrew for the role. Mr. Shaw also proposed William John Dyer, although since at the time it was considered unusual for an elector to propose multiple candidates for the same office at the same election, Dr. Williams, pro forma, proposed Dyer. Mr. W. Iles seconded that nomination. No other candidate was proposed.

=== Speeches ===
The Returning Officer then called upon the candidates to address the electors in the order of which they proposed. Mr. Grant was therefore the first person to speak.

In an account in the 15 January 1859 issue of the Otago Witness, Mr. Grant was said to have delivered a long speech in which he alluded to Macandrew's absence from the General Assembly, and that he would push for the General Assembly to allocate funds for the establishment of a university in Wellington or Nelson.

According to the Otago Witness, Macandrew stated that he had no intention of representing New Zealand again in the House of Representatives, the highest council of New Zealand. During his speech, Macandrew said that he would push for banks to be as cheap as stores, that he would support the idea of having fewer laws, and that he would support the intention of seeing a simpler form of registration used—a system in which a person could sell their properties with no intervention of lawyers among other conservative ideas.

Again according to the Otago Witness, Dyer's stance differed quite a bit from Macandrew with regard to being solicited to take a seat, Dyer thought it was or should be a point of ambition with every person to hold a place in the House of Representatives; he thought that no doubt it was a large responsibility to make laws for future generations and that he would vote for allocating funds to be put into the education of the Māori people in the province of Otago.

=== Show of hands ===
The Returning Officer then called a show of hands for the candidates which the results were as follows:

| Party | Name | Votes |
|---|---|---|
| Independent | James Macandrew | 24 |
| Independent | William John Dyer | 4 |
| Independent | James Gordon Stuart Grant | 3 |

The Returning Officer then declared the results were in favour of Macandrew. Grant demanded a poll, which was held two days later and which Macandrew won. Dyer did not participate in the poll, therefore effectively withdrawing his candidacy.

== Candidates ==
| Party | Name | Notes | Rough political position |
|---|---|---|---|
| Independent | James Macandrew | The MP for the electorate before the by-election, Macandrew had resigned from parliament following his not attending in a parliamentary session. He had expressed his desire to not be elected again. | Right-wing |
| Independent | James Gordon Stuart Grant | A more left-wing candidate than Macandrew, Grant opposed many of the principles that Macandrew supported. | Left-wing |
| Independent | William John Dyer | Like Grant, Dyer was a more left-wing candidate than Macandrew. He withdrew before the poll. | Left-wing |

== Election ==
The election was on 14 January 1859. The polling commenced at 10.00 a.m. and closed at 4.00 p.m. Macandrew won the election in a landslide with over 90% of the votes. Grant only got 3 votes.

=== Results ===
1859 Town of Dunedin by-election
| Party | Candidate | Votes | % | ±% |
|---|---|---|---|---|
| Independent | James Macandrew | 40 | 93.02 | − |
| Independent | James Gordon Stuart Grant | 3 | 6.98 | − |
| Majority | | 37 | 86.05 | − |
| Total votes | | 43 | - | - |

== Aftermath ==
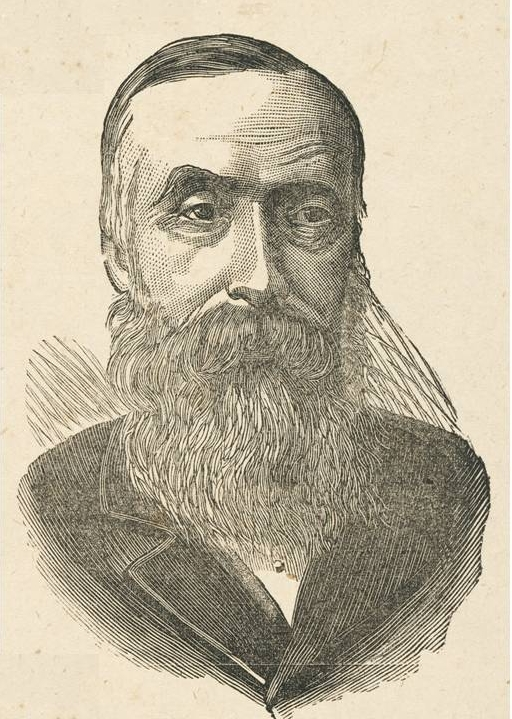
Portrait of Thomas Dick in 1882

The next election, in 1860, Macandrew did not contest and the electorate became a multi-member electorate. William John Dyer, who had withdrawn his nomination for representative of the electorate two years earlier for the by-election, contested the election. The election was held on 24 December 1860.
