= Dunedin Southern Cemetery =

Cemetery in Otago, New Zealand

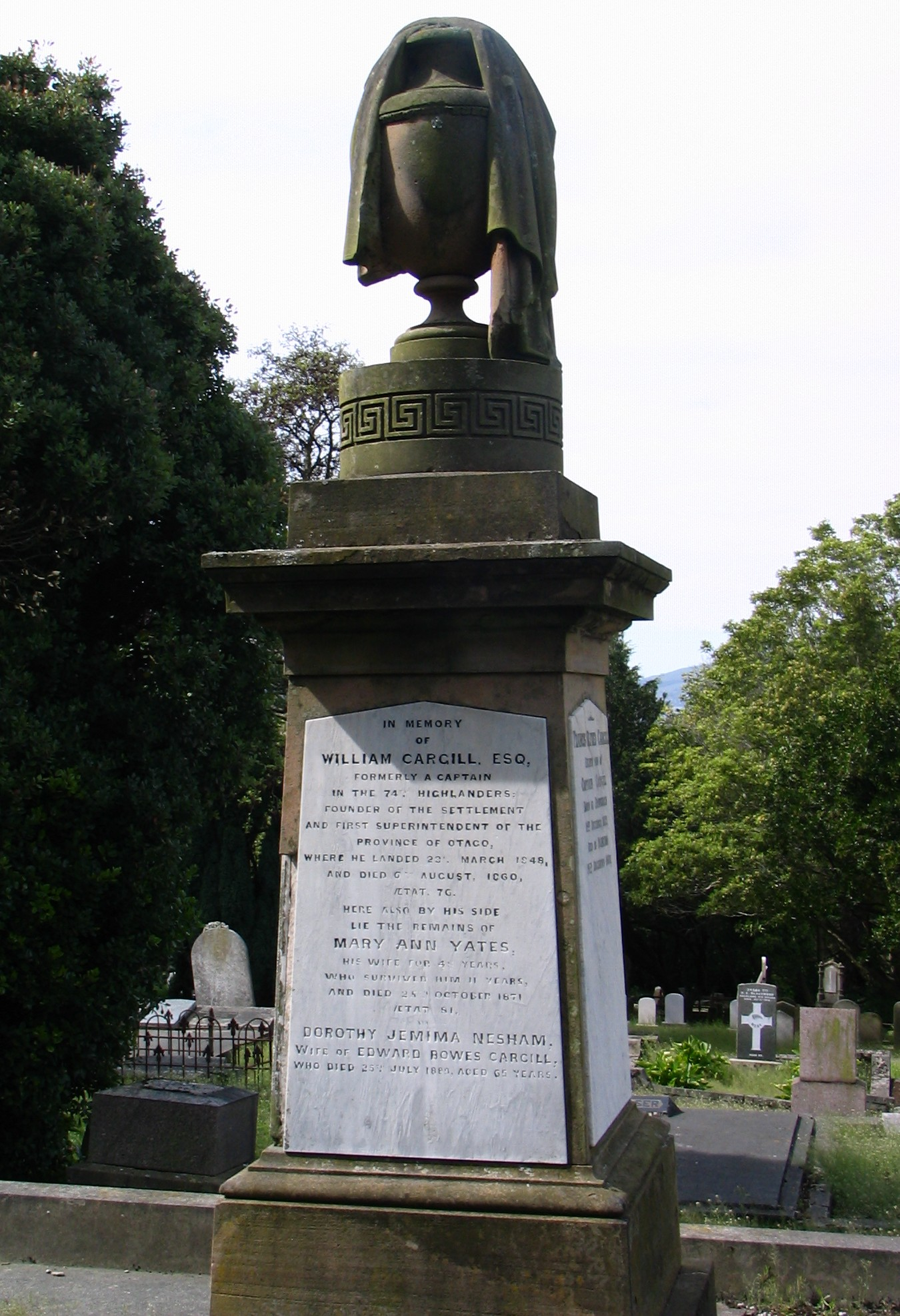
- William Cargill's gravestone in Dunedin Southern Cemetery.
- Interactive map of Dunedin Southern Cemetery

Details
- Established: 1858
- Location: Princes Street, Dunedin
- Country: New Zealand
- Coordinates: 45.8899°S 170.4937°E
- Owned by: City of Dunedin
- No. of graves: >23,000
- Website: Official website
- Find a Grave: Dunedin Southern Cemetery

Heritage New Zealand – Category 1
- Official name: Southern Cemetery
- Designated: 30 June 2006
- Reference no.: 7657

The Southern Cemetery in Dunedin, New Zealand was the first major cemetery to be opened in the city. The cemetery was opened in 1858, ten years after the founding of the city in an area known as Little Paisley. This area lies at the southern end of Princes Street, one of the city's main streets, close to the suburbs of Kensington, Maryhill, and The Glen (part of Caversham).

== Description ==
The cemetery covers an area of some 5.7 hectares (14 acres), and is one of the most important nineteenth-century cemeteries in New Zealand. It is sited on a steeply sloping site on a spur at the southern end of the central city, overlooking "The Flat", the area of coastal plain on which the suburbs of South Dunedin and Saint Kilda are located. It is divided into separate sections set aside for Presbyterians, Anglicans, and Roman catholics, as well as a Jewish section. The cemetery was opened in early 1858, with the earliest recorded interment being that of John MacGibbon in March 1858.

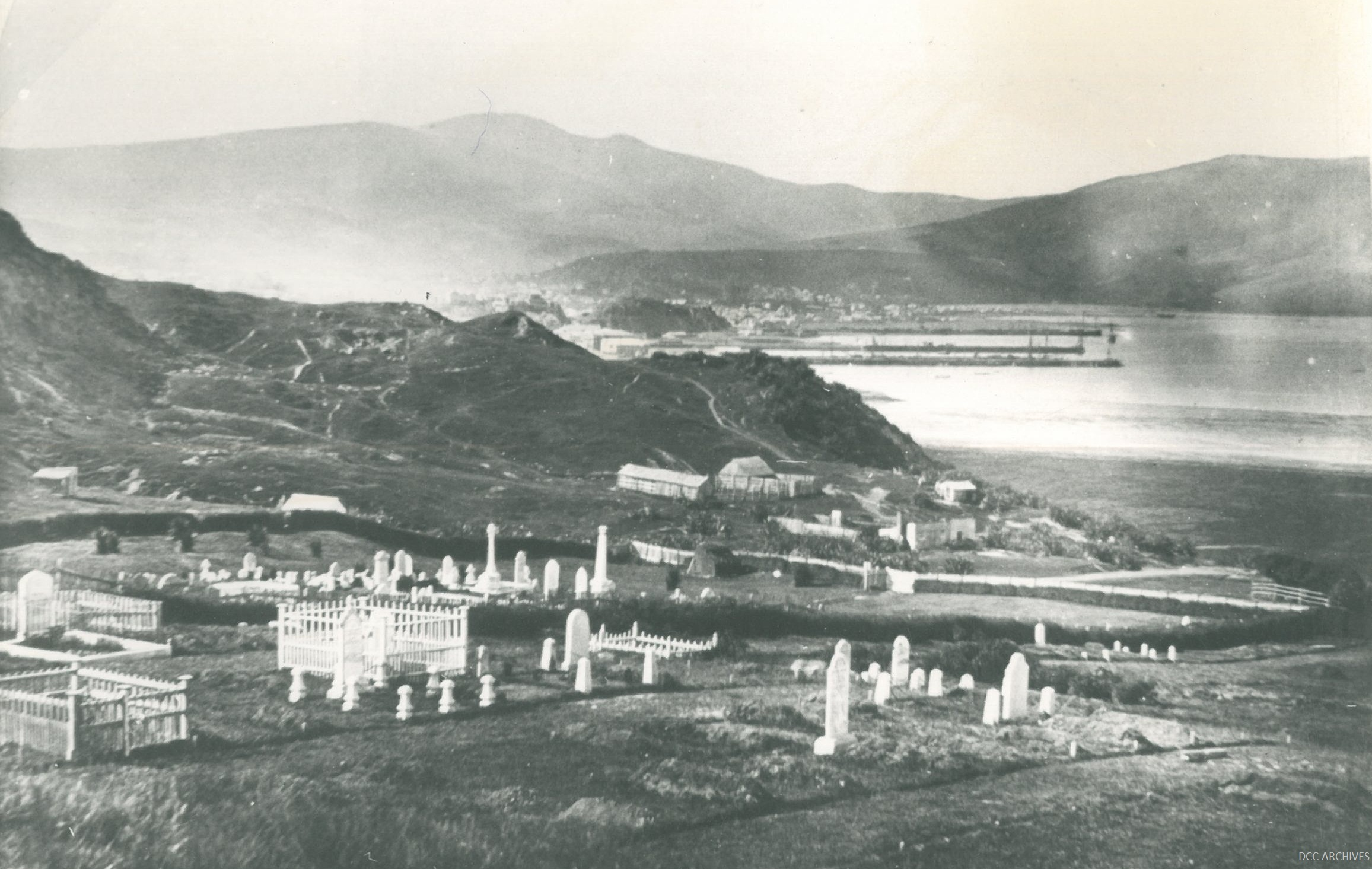
Dunedin Southern Cemetery in the 1860s

In all, some 23,000 burials were recorded at the Southern Cemetery. Much of the cemetery is in a poor state of maintenance, though there are plans to repair some of its more damaged areas. There are 21 graves of service personnel registered and maintained by the Commonwealth War Graves Commission, 20 from World War I and one from World War II. The cemetery is listed on the New Zealand Historic Places Trust Register as a Historic Place – Category I.

The cemetery includes, at its city end, a historic mortuary building, which was used from 1903 to 1949.

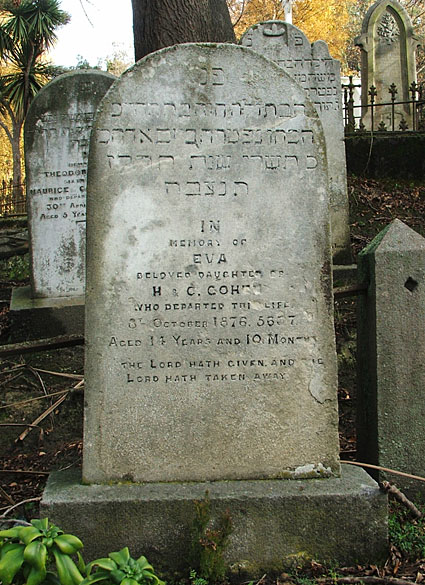
The cemetery's Jewish and Chinese sections are of particular historical importance.

The Northern Cemetery, at the other end of the city's main urban area, was opened in 1872. Neither of these cemeteries are still used for new burials (the last burials at the Southern Cemetery were in 1985); as of 2009 Dunedin's main cemetery is at Andersons Bay in the south of the city.

=== Jewish section ===
The Jewish portion of the cemetery is located close to South Road in the lower part of the cemetery, and contains around 180 burials, with the earliest being from 1863. A large proportion of New Zealand's early Jewish immigrants are buried in the cemetery's Jewish section, with members of many of New Zealand's more notable Jewish families – including the Hallensteins, Theomins, Joels, and De Beers – among those interred.

=== Chinese section ===
The 1860s saw a major influx of people into the city due to the Otago gold rush, including a large number of Chinese from Guangdong; a separate Chinese section to the cemetery was added in the years that followed. The section was designated separate not on ethnic grounds, but due to religious affiliation, as with the other sections of the cemetery, and has some features which are built according to feng shui practice.

Up to 200 Chinese burials are thought to have taken place between 1877 and 1921, of which 114 have been identified, with the majority of those interred having originally come from around the Pearl River Delta. Other interments, including several from the Panyu District, were exhumed in the 1880s and early 1900s at the behest of the Poon Fah Association, in order to return the dead to their ancestral soil in China.

== Notable interments ==
- Thomas Burns
- Captain William Cargill
- Henry Clapcott (1830–1897), treasurer of the Otago Provincial Council (1864–65)
- Willi Fels
- Hugh Gourley (1825–1906)
- Bendix Hallenstein
- Maurice Joel
- Johnny Jones
- Leopold Kirschner
- William Downie Stewart
- Dorothy Theomin
- Prince Konstanty Alojzy Drucki-Lubecki
