= Peter Johnstone (rugby union) =

- Born: 9 August 1922 Mosgiel, New Zealand
- Died: 18 October 1997 (aged 75) Wānaka, New Zealand
- Height: 1.83 m (6 ft 0 in)
- Weight: 86 kg (190 lb)
- School: Mosgiel District High School

Rugby union career
- Position(s): Flanker; Number 8
Provincial / State sides
Years	Team	Apps	(Points)
1943	Ashburton County		
1947–1951	Otago		
International career
Years	Team	Apps	(Points)
1949–1951	New Zealand	9	(3)

Peter Johnstone (9 August 1922 – 18 October 1997) was a New Zealand rugby union player. A backrow forward, Johnstone represented Ashburton County while serving in the army and later Otago at a provincial level. He was a member of the New Zealand national side, the All Blacks, from 1949 to 1951. He played 26 matches for the All Blacks—10 as captain—including nine internationals, touring South Africa in 1949 and playing all four tests against the touring 1950 British Lions.

Johnstone was a key member of the Otago Ranfurly Shield team from 1947 to 1950. He continued to support the Taieri club after his playing days and was coach of the first Taieri team to win the Dunedin premier banner, sharing it with University A in 1955.

Johnstone saw that the Taieri club needed a better ground and clubrooms, and he used his bridge-building business to help develop the new ground beside the Silverstream. It was named in his honour. The club has the best grounds in Otago and they are used when inner-city grounds were too wet to play on. The clubrooms are among the biggest in Dunedin.

Johnstone was an Otago selector from 1959 to 1961 and also served as president of the Otago Rugby Football Union.
