= Wayne Blair (cricketer) =

New Zealand cricketer (1948–2019)

Personal information
- Full name: Wayne Leslie Blair
- Born: 11 May 1948; Dunedin, New Zealand
- Died: 11 January 2019 (aged 70); Dunedin, New Zealand
- Batting: Left-handed
- Relatives: Bruce Blair (brother); Roy Blair (father); James Blair (great uncle)

Domestic team information
- Years: Team
- 1967/68–1990/91: Otago

Career statistics
Competition	First-class	List A
Matches	82	31
Runs scored	3,698	745
Batting average	26.04	24.03
100s/50s	2/15	2/1
Top score	140	108
Catches/stumpings	66/2	12/0
- Source: ESPNcricinfo, 19 September 2014

Wayne Leslie Blair (11 May 1948 – 11 January 2019) was a New Zealand cricketer who played first-class cricket for Otago from 1967 to 1991.

== Early life ==
Blair made his first-class debut for Otago in 1967–68 as an opening batsman. He played all that season and all the next, reaching 50 only once, when he scored 83 in the last match of the 1968–69 season. He moved down the order in 1969–70, keeping wicket in one match and winning selection in a New Zealand Under-23 team against the touring Australians, when he top-scored in the second innings with 40. He returned to the opening position and produced a number of useful but not large scores up to the end of the 1973–74 season.

After a time out of first-class cricket, Blair returned to the Otago team in 1977–78 and maintained his place. He made his first century in the match against Canterbury in 1980–81, batting at number four. After Canterbury declared at 409 for 5, Otago were dismissed for 224 (Blair top-scoring with 88) and, following on, 266 (Blair again top-scoring with 140). His other century came the following season, when he scored 132 out of a total of 274 against Wellington.

He left first-class cricket after the 1982–83 season, but was recalled in 1990–91 at the age of 42 as a middle-order batsman. He reached a score of at least 40 in each of the first three matches, but finished with 165 runs at an average of 18.33 in five matches. That was his last season in first-class cricket.

In domestic List A cricket Blair won the man of the match award when he scored 102 against Wellington in 1979–80.

Blair died in Dunedin on 11 January 2019.

His younger brother, Bruce, played One Day Internationals for New Zealand in the 1980s.
