= Roy Blair =

New Zealand skater and cricketer

Roy Alexander James Blair (13 June 1921 – 31 May 2002) was a New Zealand roller skater, speed skater, cricketer and golfer. He was born and died in Dunedin. He worked as a teacher, and in the Second World war served with the Air Force.

== Skating ==
Blair was New Zealand's best roller skater between 1937 and 1941, winning 9 national titles on the 440 yards, 880 yards, and mile races. He competed in the 1938 Empire Games. He then switched to speed skating, winning the quarter mile race at the national championships in 1947 and 1948.

== Cricket ==
A left-handed batsman and right-arm off-break bowler who played for Otago, Blair made a single first-class appearance for the team during the 1953–54 season, against Canterbury. From the opening order, he scored a duck in the first innings in which he batted, and when positioned further down in the order for the second innings, he scored 2 runs. He was later a selector for Otago and worked as a schoolteacher.

Blair's sons, Bruce and Wayne, and uncle James also played first-class cricket.
