= John McGlashan (politician) =

New Zealand lawyer, politician, public servant, educationalist

John McGlashan (7 November 1802 – 2 November 1864) was a New Zealand lawyer, politician, public servant and educationalist.

== Life ==
McGlashan was born in Edinburgh, Scotland on 7 November 1802. John McGlashan worked tirelessly for the Otago Association as its secretary and in 1853, he decided to emigrate himself. In Dunedin, he joined Edward McGlashan (1817–1889), his younger brother.

His brother was elected onto the first Otago Provincial Council in 1853. John McGlashan stood for election in the Western electorate for the second provincial council, and he represented the electorate from 29 November 1855 to 11 December 1859, and from 13 January 1860 to 7 February 1863. John McGlashan served on the Executive Council on four occasions between 1855 and 1863, and during that time was provincial secretary and provincial solicitor. In 1858, he was deputy superintendent under William Cargill.

McGlashan died after a riding accident in 1864. His daughter gifted his house and estate, and in 1918 John McGlashan College was founded from this. The house was named Balmacewen, in reference to McGlashan's wife, whose maiden name was MacEwen, and "bal" meaning dwelling in Gaelic. Commemorating McGlashan's deep interest in education in Otago, the college is a state integrated Presbyterian boys' intermediate and high school.
