= Philip Laing =

19th century British passenger ship

The Philip Laing was a 19th-century sailing ship best known as the second immigrant ship to arrive in Dunedin, New Zealand, on 15 April 1848. Chartered by the New Zealand Company for this voyage the ship was carrying Scottish settlers, under the charge of the Rev. Dr. Thomas Burns.

== Construction ==
The Philip Laing was a wooden barque-rigged sailing ship of 459 tonnes (452 long tons; 506 short tons). The ship was approximately 55 metres (180 feet) long with a beam of 12 metres (39 feet) with square rigs on the foremast and mainmast and fore and aft rigging on the mizzen mast.

The ship was built with the yard number 167 by the James Laing yard at Deptford in Sunderland for Laing & Ridley of Liverpool. She was launched on 23 July 1846.

== Service history ==
=== Voyage to Otago ===
On 22 September 1847 an advertisement was posted by William Cargill of the New Zealand Company calling for tenders for two vessels of not less than 450, nor more than 650 tons, to transport immigrants to Otago in New Zealand one of which was to sail from London, and one from Glasgow about 30 October. The Philip Laing was chartered from Laing & Ridley for approximately £1,800 to deliver immigrants from Glasgow. The other chartered ship was the John Wickliffe. The price for passage varied from 16 guineas for steerage, 20 guineas for a cabin and from 35 to 60 guineas for a full cabin.

The ship was under the command of Captain Andrew Jamieson Elles with Surgeon-Supt Dr Robert Ramsay responsible for the health of the crew and passengers. The immigrants were under the charge of the Rev. Dr. Thomas Burns who was to become one of the leaders of the new Dunedin settlement. The voyage of the settlers was extensively recorded in a diary kept by Burns.

Most of the immigrants boarded in Greenock on 20 November 1847 and it left port on the 26 November 1847 under the tow of a steamer as far as the Tail of the Bank, where it anchored while the captain and company representatives went back on shore. On 27 November, the captain returned and ordered the anchor up at 2 p.m. Once underway, the wind soon died away, and at midnight the ship was only three miles below the Clock Lighthouse. On 28 November the ship anchored in Lamlash Bay, Isle of Arran in the Firth of Clyde. The next day there was a suitable wind, but the ship could not take immediate advantage of it, as it was necessary to trim the ship, overhaul some of the stores, and source some water casks from shore. Thomas Burns took the opportunity to arrange for timber to be purchased and brought on board so that it could be used to enclose the open galley used to prepare the food for the steerage passengers. Not only was the existing arrangement uncomfortable for the cooks, but it was also very difficult to start the fires.

While a violent storm prevented departure, the ship lay at anchor in Lamlash Bay for 10 days before they managed to sail until worsening conditions again forced the ship to take shelter, this time in Milford Haven in Wales, where they dropped anchor at 7 a.m. on 12 December. For eight days the ship lay at anchor, during which time the passengers were able to make visits ashore. Burns also had a plumber make repairs on the ship in the interests of the emigrants. Finally, the ship was able to depart on 20 December 1847 for New Zealand.

The Philip Laing carried 26 crew, 247 emigrants, of which 12 were in cabins and 235 in steerage. Among the passengers were 93 children under 14 years of age. Steerage passengers were in one open cabin, 45 metres by 11 metres which was lined down each side with narrow bunks.

Once underway, the ship’s best day's run was 216 miles, which occurred on 24 February 1848. Other runs referred to include 172 miles, 188 miles, and 204 miles. The ship’s log records that at times it reached speeds of 9, 9 1/2, and even 9 3/4 knots.

The ship arrived at Port Chalmers in Otago Harbour on 15 April 1848 after a passage of 117 days. Here she found already anchored, the John Wickliffe, which had arrived three weeks earlier.

Despite being somewhat smaller than the 662-ton John Wickliffe, the Philip Laing carried the majority of the immigrants (247, to John Wickliffe's 97), the larger ship having largely been laden with provisions for the new settlement.

Following her arrival at Port Chalmers at least three of the ship’s crew deserted. Captain Elles married Clementine Burns the eldest daughter of Thomas and Clementina Burns on 14 June 1848. The wedding certificate, signed by Thomas Burns, is preserved in the historic Bible of the Philip Laing, which is one of the most sacred relics in the Otago Early Settlers' Library. The courtship had begun on the voyage out.

On 15 June the ship departed for Wellington, arriving there on 19 June.

=== Subsequent service ===
Subsequently, the Philip Laing was employed in 1854 as a transport in the Crimean War. In the following year, she was at Hobart, having brought out government stores and ammunition. From Hobart, she sailed in ballast to Madras, India.

In 1856 the ship brought out passengers and cargo from London to Wellington and Lyttelton. During the voyage she caught fire just after having called at the Cape of Good Hope, but it was quickly extinguished. When leaving Lyttelton, bound for Singapore, she was struck by a squall and nearly capsized, but she righted herself, but not before it had been mistakenly reported that she had sunk with the loss of all of her crew.

The ship made several trips between the United Kingdom and the East. On one occasion she was stranded on an island in the Java Sea for 36 hours until the crew was able to refloat the ship.

The Philip Laing is last mentioned in the Lloyd's Register with her captain given as J. S. Cadenhead. The ship ended its days as a coal hulk at Hong Kong.

== Commemoration ==
Laing Street in Port Chalmers is named after the ship, as is Philip Laing House, in the Exchange area of downtown Dunedin (which sits diagonally opposite John Wickliffe House, named for Dunedin's other first ship).
