= James Gordon Stuart Grant =

New Zealand demagogue, journalist, eccentric (1834–1902)

James Gordon Stuart Grant (c. 1834 – 27 February 1902) was a New Zealand demagogue, journalist and eccentric. He was born in Glenlivet, Banffshire, Scotland in circa 1834.

He unsuccessfully stood in the 1859 Town of Dunedin by-election against James Macandrew. He won election to the Otago Provincial Council in an October 1865 by-election and was a member until 1867 when he did not stand for re-election. Instead, he stood for superintendent of the Otago Province but only received 2 of the 3,653 votes cast.

From 1866, he stood in numerous parliamentary elections, including the 1866 election in the Caversham electorate, and the 1867 by-election, 1869 by-election and 1874 by-election for the City of Dunedin electorate.

The last election in which he stood was the 1884 election. when he received one vote (presumably his own).

He died penniless in 1902.

== Publications ==
- The Cynic, Dunedin 1875
