= Waihola =

Waihola Waihora (Māori)
- Town
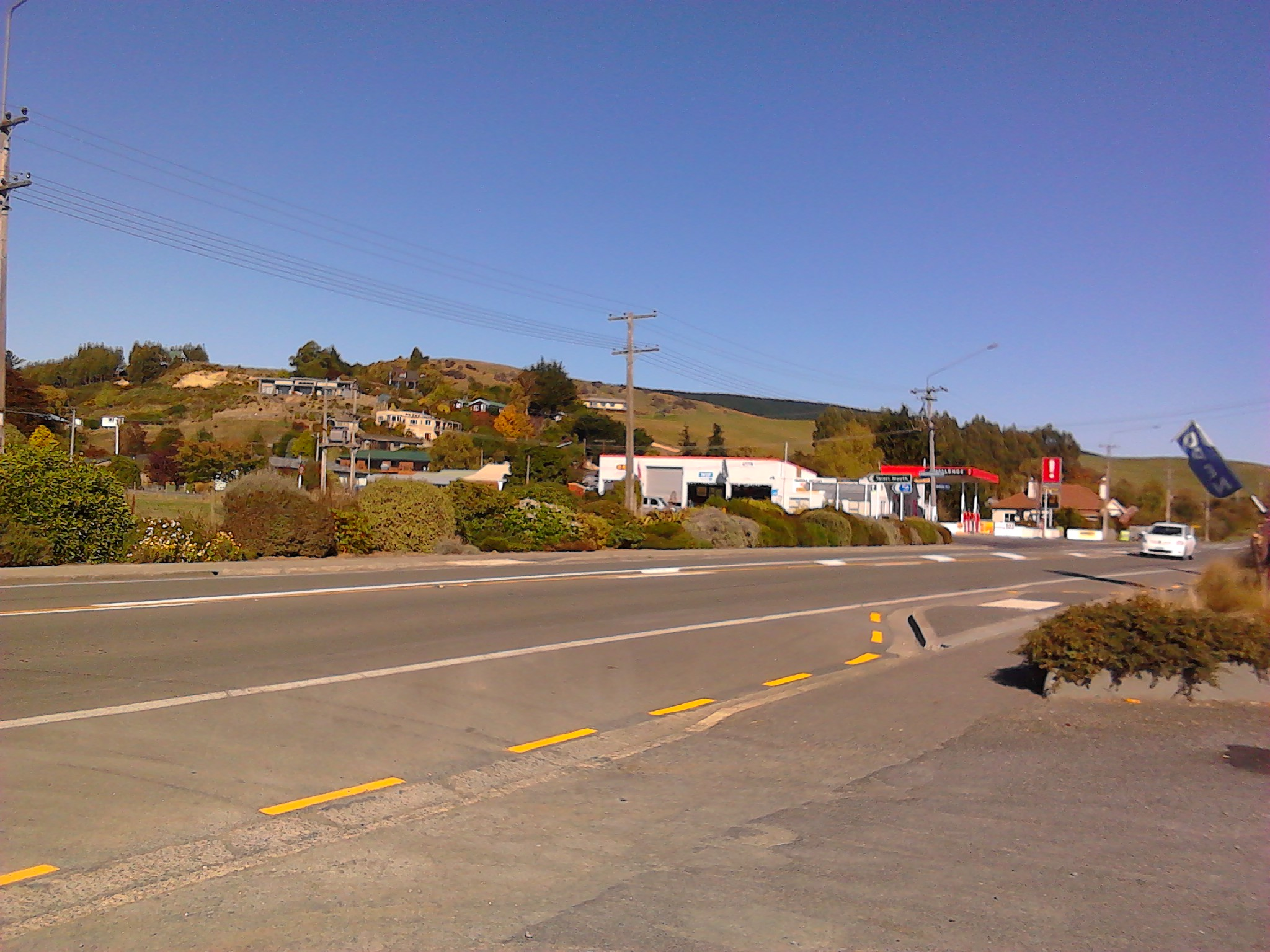
- Main street of Waihola
- Interactive map of Waihola
- Coordinates: 46°2′0″S 170°6′0″E
- Country: New Zealand
- Region: Otago
- District: Clutha
- Ward: Bruce
- Electorates: Taieri; Te Tai Tonga (Māori)

Government
  - Territorial authority: Clutha District Council
  - Regional council: Otago Regional Council
  - Mayor of Clutha: Jock Martin
  - Taieri MP: Ingrid Leary
  - Te Tai Tonga MP: Tākuta Ferris

Area
  - Total: 1.63 km^{2} (0.63 sq mi)

Population (June 2025)
  - Total: 550
  - Density: 340/km^{2} (870/sq mi)
- Urban PO Box Lobby Postcode (Waihola, Waihola): 9243
- Rural Delivery Postcode (RD 1, Outram): 9073
- International telephone access and area code: 03
- ISO 3166 code: 554
- Local iwi: Ngāi Tahu

The township of Waihola lies between Dunedin and Milton, New Zealand in Otago, in New Zealand's South Island. It lies close to the southeast shore of the shallow tidal lake which shares its name.

The town is located on State Highway 1, and the South Island Main Trunk rail line runs through it, though trains no longer stop. The township is within the boundaries of Clutha District.

== Etymology ==
The name Waihola is accepted to be analogous with the word wai-hora, meaning "spreading waters". An alternative meaning of Waihola (originally Waihora) is 'wide waters'. The place name for the location of Waihola is assigned as an official place name by the New Zealand Geographic Board. The place name also creates some interest as the Māori alphabet does not normally contain the letter 'L'. This is most likely an example of an earlier Southern Māori dialect.

== Demographics ==
Waihola is described by Statistics New Zealand as a rural settlement. It covers 1.63 km^{2} (0.63 sq mi), and had an estimated population of 550 as of June 2025, with a population density of 337 people per km^{2}. It is part of the much larger Bruce statistical area.

Historical population for Waihola
Year	Pop.	±% p.a.
2006	276	—
2013	354	+3.62%
2018	399	+2.42%

Waihola had a population of 399 at the 2018 New Zealand census, an increase of 45 people (12.7%) since the 2013 census, and an increase of 123 people (44.6%) since the 2006 census. There were 168 households, comprising 204 males and 198 females, giving a sex ratio of 1.03 males per female, with 75 people (18.8%) aged under 15 years, 36 (9.0%) aged 15 to 29, 195 (48.9%) aged 30 to 64, and 90 (22.6%) aged 65 or older.

Ethnicities were 94.0% European/Pākehā, 10.5% Māori, 1.5% Asian, and 1.5% other ethnicities. People may identify with more than one ethnicity.

Although some people chose not to answer the census's question about religious affiliation, 60.2% had no religion, 31.6% were Christian and 3.0% had other religions.

Of those at least 15 years old, 48 (14.8%) people had a bachelor's or higher degree, and 93 (28.7%) people had no formal qualifications. 42 people (13.0%) earned over $70,000 compared to 17.2% nationally. The employment status of those at least 15 was that 153 (47.2%) people were employed full-time, 45 (13.9%) were part-time, and 12 (3.7%) were unemployed.

=== Bruce ===
The Bruce statistical area also includes Taieri Mouth, and surrounds but does not include Milton. It covers 879.73 km^{2} (339.67 sq mi) and had an estimated population of 2,650 as of June 2025, with a population density of 3.0 people per km^{2}.

Historical population for Bruce statistical area
Year	Pop.	±% p.a.
2006	1,572	—
2013	2,043	+3.81%
2018	2,250	+1.95%

Bruce had a population of 2,250 at the 2018 New Zealand census, an increase of 207 people (10.1%) since the 2013 census, and an increase of 678 people (43.1%) since the 2006 census. There were 780 households, comprising 1,317 males and 939 females, giving a sex ratio of 1.4 males per female. The median age was 43.0 years (compared with 37.4 years nationally), with 399 people (17.7%) aged under 15 years, 330 (14.7%) aged 15 to 29, 1,182 (52.5%) aged 30 to 64, and 342 (15.2%) aged 65 or older.

Ethnicities were 90.3% European/Pākehā, 13.3% Māori, 1.2% Pasifika, 1.7% Asian, and 2.0% other ethnicities. People may identify with more than one ethnicity.

The percentage of people born overseas was 10.9, compared with 27.1% nationally.

Although some people chose not to answer the census's question about religious affiliation, 57.5% had no religion, 30.7% were Christian, 0.9% had Māori religious beliefs, 0.3% were Hindu, 0.3% were Muslim, 0.7% were Buddhist and 2.3% had other religions.

Of those at least 15 years old, 225 (12.2%) people had a bachelor's or higher degree, and 426 (23.0%) people had no formal qualifications. The median income was $28,600, compared with $31,800 nationally. 210 people (11.3%) earned over $70,000 compared to 17.2% nationally. The employment status of those at least 15 was that 882 (47.6%) people were employed full-time, 300 (16.2%) were part-time, and 66 (3.6%) were unemployed.

== Tourism ==
Waihola is a popular destination for day-trips from Dunedin, 35 kilometres to the north, and the lake is a venue for many water sports, including waterskiing, rowing, and yachting.

The 2175-hectare Waihola Waipori wetland system is one of the largest and most significant remaining lowland wetland systems in New Zealand. It is a diverse and highly productive ecosystem, supporting threatened species such as the giant kōkopu and the South Island Fernbird. The wetland is of great significance to Kāi Tahu and is used for recreational hunting and fishing.

The Sinclair Wetlands are also located at Waihola.

== Education ==
Waihola District School is a co-educational state primary school for Year 1 to 8 students, with a roll of 26 as of July 2026. The school started in 1859.

== Gallery ==
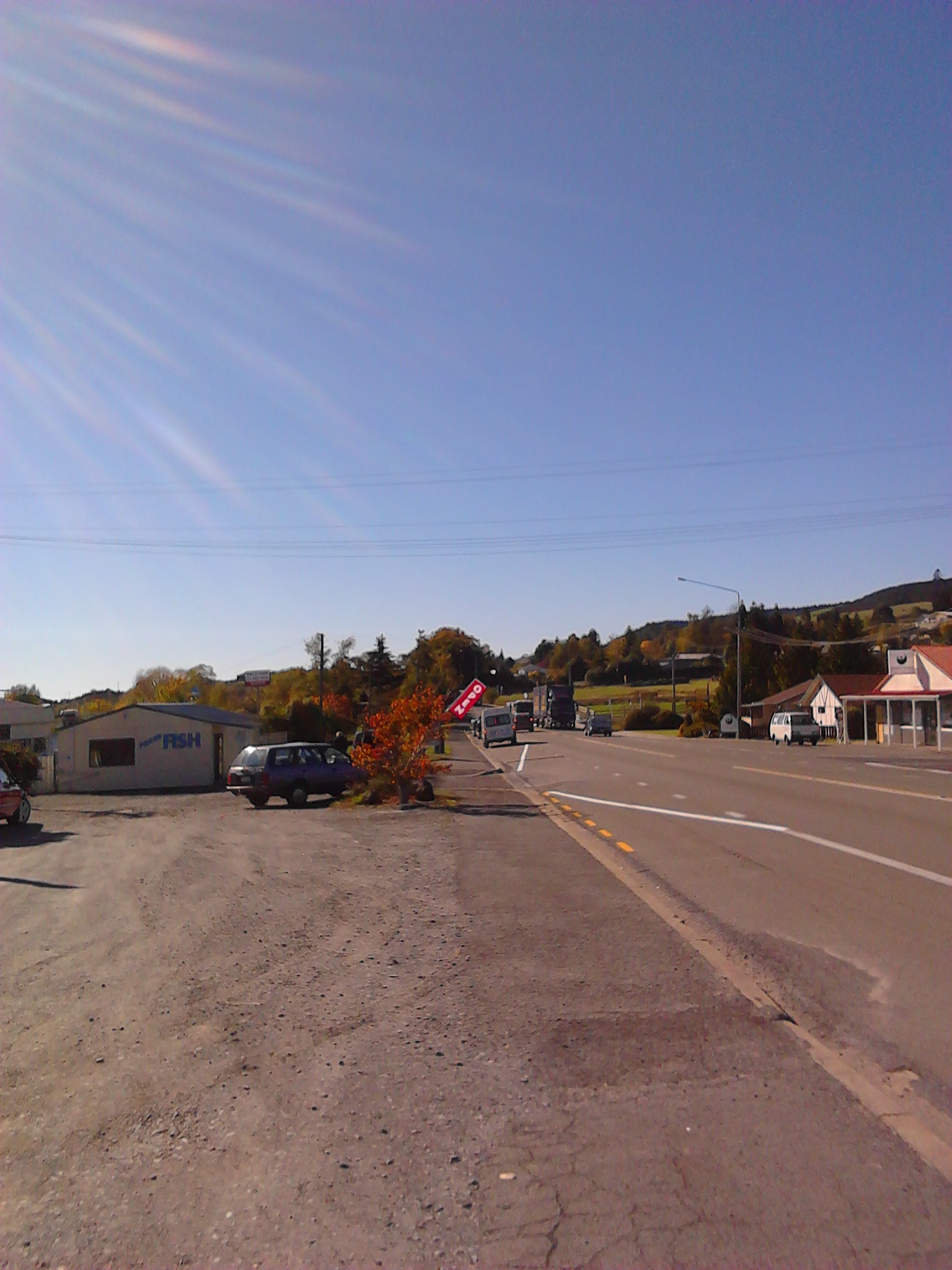
Main road of Waihola looking north

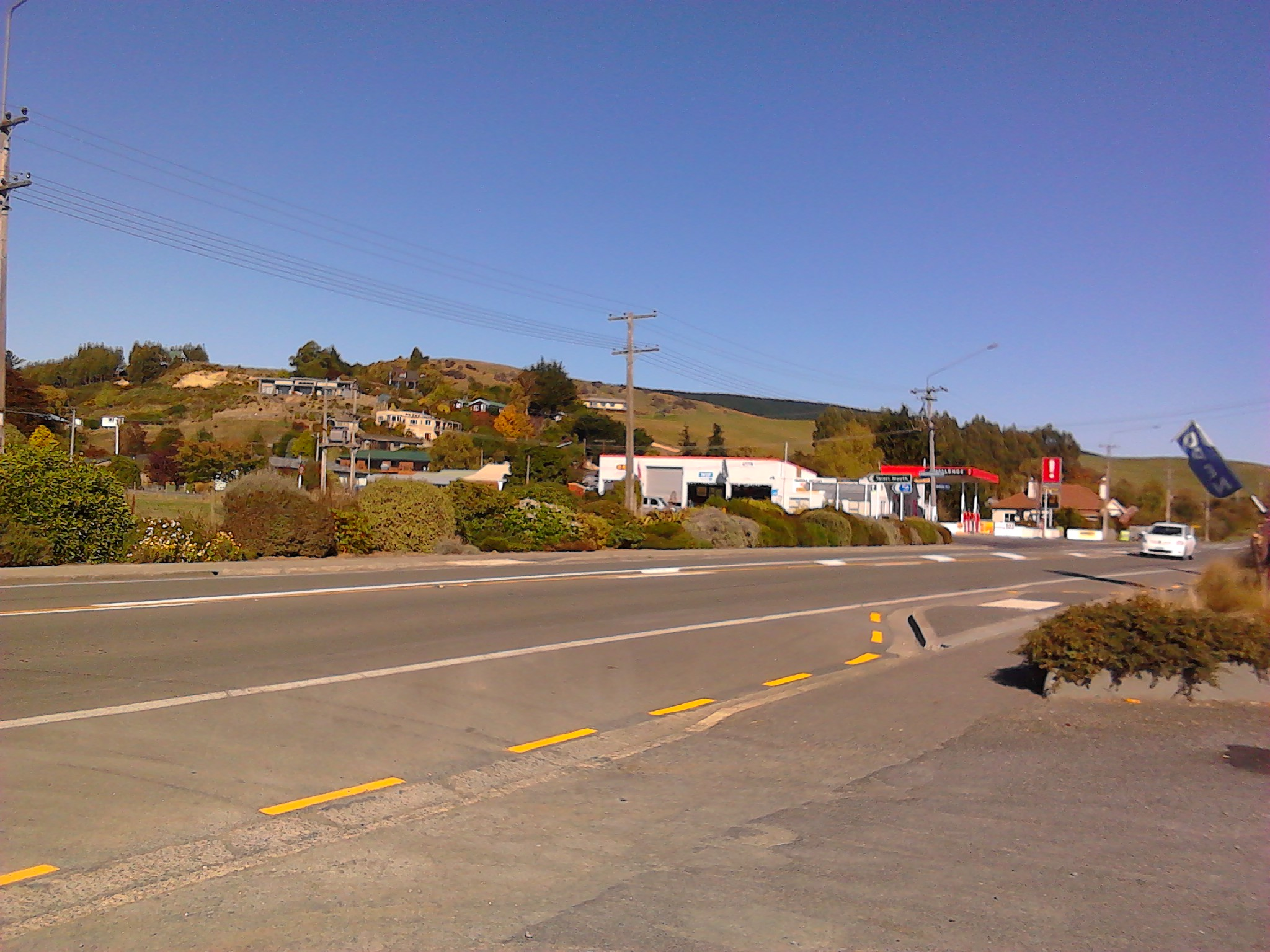
Houses and a petrol station in Waihola

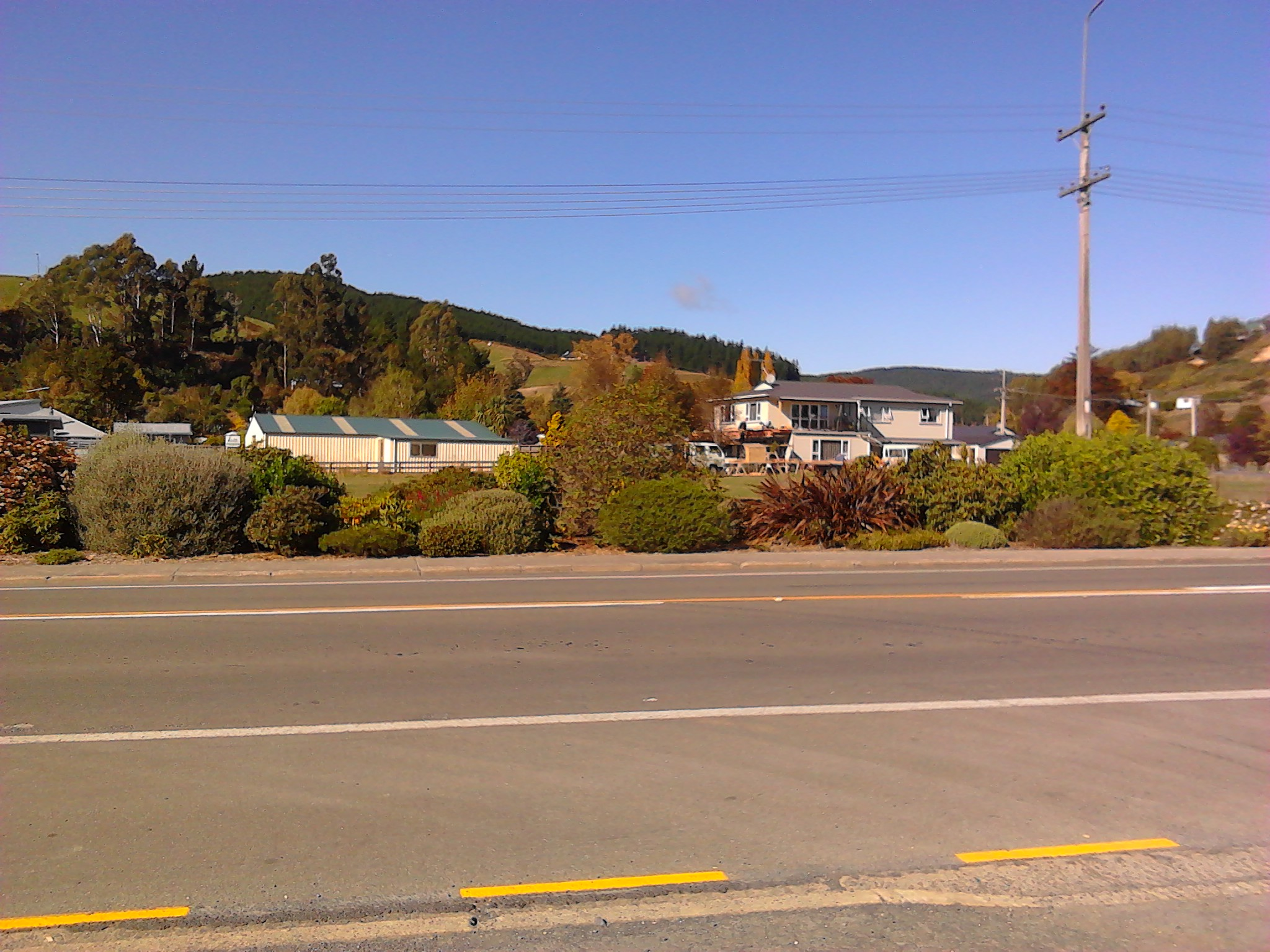
Houses in Waihola
