= John Wickliffe (ship) =

19th-century Scottish ship

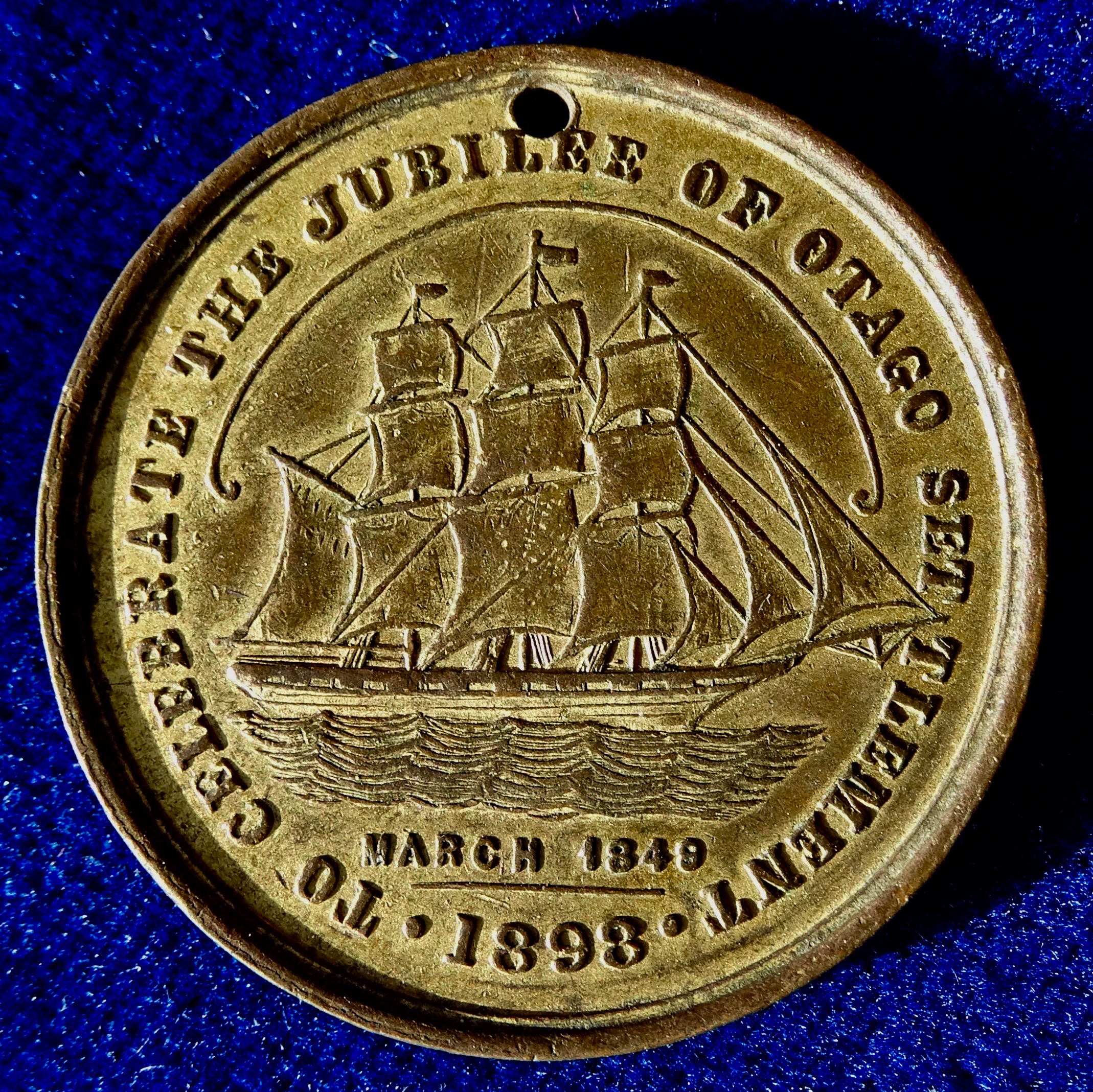
- Jubilee of Otago Medal 1898, showing the John Wickliffe at Port Chalmers, March 1848

History

United Kingdom
- Name: John Wickliffe
- Launched: 1841

General characteristics
- Tons burthen: 662 tons

The John Wickliffe was the first ship to arrive carrying Scottish settlers, including Otago settlement founder Captain William Cargill, in the city of Dunedin, New Zealand. The ship was named after the religious reformer, John Wycliffe.

Departing with 97 passengers from Gravesend, near London, on 22 November 1847, and from Portsmouth on 14 December 1847, she arrived at Port Chalmers on 23 March 1848. Her sister ship, the Philip Laing, arrived three weeks later on 15 April.

23 March is now observed as Otago Anniversary Day, although the anniversary actually celebrates the establishment of the Otago provincial government on the same day in 1852, and the day of the observance varies from year to year: it is usually observed on the Monday closest to 23 March.

== Commemoration ==
One of the more prominent buildings in the Exchange area of downtown Dunedin is named John Wickliffe House in honour of the ship. It stands on land close to where the ship berthed in Dunedin.

Wickliffe Street in Port Chalmers is named after the ship, as is Wickliffe Press, a Dunedin-based publishing company.
