= Bruce Blair (cricketer) =

New Zealand cricketer (born 1957)

Personal information
- Full name: Bruce Robert Blair
- Born: 27 December 1957 (age 68); Dunedin, Otago, New Zealand
- Batting: Left-handed
- Bowling: Right-arm medium
- Relatives: Wayne Blair (brother); Roy Blair (father); James Blair (great uncle)

International information
- National side: New Zealand (1982–1986)
- ODI debut (cap 41): 17 February 1982 v Australia
- Last ODI: 15 April 1986 v Pakistan

Domestic team information
- Years: Team
- 1976/77–1983/84: Otago
- 1984/85–1985/86: Northern Districts
- 1986/87–1989/90: Otago

Career statistics
Competition	ODI	FC	LA
Matches	14	110	74
Runs scored	174	5,995	1,583
Batting average	14.50	32.58	23.62
100s/50s	0/0	7/40	0/11
Top score	29*	143	91
Balls bowled	30	3,796	2,087
Wickets	1	55	43
Bowling average	34.00	31.81	31.62
5 wickets in innings	0	0	0
10 wickets in match	0	0	0
Best bowling	1/7	4/26	4/37
Catches/stumpings	4/–	81/–	24/–
- Source: Cricinfo, 11 May 2017

Bruce Robert Blair (born 27 December 1957) is a New Zealand former cricketer who played first-class cricket for Otago and Northern Districts between 1977 and 1990. He played 14 One Day Internationals for the New Zealand national cricket team in the mid-1980s. He coached Northern Districts from 2001 to 2006 and was later a coaching services advisor at the New Zealand Academy of Sport in Hamilton. He was a selector for both Northern Districts and Central Districts.

Blair was born at Dunedin and educated at Otago Boys High School. His father, Roy Blair, played for Otago in 1953–54 and his older brother, Wayne, played first-class cricket for Otago from 1967–68 to 1990–91. A great-uncle, James Blair, also played for Otago in 1926–27.
