= 1858 Hutt by-election =

New Zealand by-election

The 1858 Hutt by-election was a New Zealand by-election held in the multi-member electorate of Hutt during the 2nd New Zealand Parliament on 31 July 1858, following the resignation of Dillon Bell and Samuel Revans on 22 March. The election was won by Alfred Renall and William Fitzherbert, who had resigned from the multi-member electorate City of Wellington in order to contest this by-election. That resignation forced a by-election to happen. Two other candidates unsuccessfully contested the electorate, George Hart and Peter Cheyne.

== Results ==
1858 Hutt by-election
Party	Candidate	Votes	%	±%
Independent	William Fitzherbert	229	30.29	−
Independent	Alfred Renall	228	30.16	−
Independent	George Hart	153	20.24	−
Independent	Peter Cheyne	146	19.31	−
Majority		75 (Note: Majority is the difference between lowest winning poll (Renall: 228) and highest losing poll (Hart: 153))	9.92	−
Total votes		756	-	-

Table footnotes:
