= Robert Hart (politician) =

New Zealand politician

Member of the 1st New Zealand Parliament for City of Wellington
- In office 1854–1855
- Prime Minister: James FitzGerald (head of the Executive Council)
- Preceded by: n/a
- Succeeded by: Isaac Featherston; William Fitzherbert

Personal details
- Born: 1814
- Died: 1894 (aged 79–80)
- Relations: George Hart (brother); Donald McLean (brother-in-law)
- Occupation: Lawyer

Robert Hart (1814 – 16 September 1894) was a 19th-century New Zealand politician.

== Biography ==
New Zealand Parliament
Years	Term	Electorate	Party
1853–1855	1st	City of Wellington	Independent

Hart was also baptised on 4 April 1815. He and his brother George left London in April 1843 on board the Mary, arriving in Wellington on 9 August 1843.

He was a well-known solicitor and barrister in Wellington, first with the firm Messrs. Holroyd and Hart, then for many years as the principal member of the firm Messrs Hart and Buckley.

He was elected in 1853 to the 1st New Zealand Parliament, representing the City of Wellington electorate, but did not serve in any further Parliaments. In the 1855 general election, five people contested the City of Wellington electorate. Whilst the results were close, Hart came last and was not returned. He contested 27 December 1856 by-election against Samuel Revans in the Hutt electorate and gained 24 votes against 96 for Revans.

In 1859, he was appointed Judge of the District Courts of Wellington, Hawke's Bay and Wanganui. He was appointed to the Legislative Council on 9 July 1872, and remained a member until his death in 1894.

He married Catherine McLean on 10 January 1867 at St. Andrew's Church, Wellington. Catherine was the sister of Donald McLean, the Superintendent of Hawke's Bay Province. His brother was the politician George Hart.
