= New Zealand Advertiser and Bay of Islands Gazette =

New Zealand newspaper

The New Zealand Advertiser and Bay of Islands Gazette was New Zealand's second newspaper and the original publication used by the colonial administration to publish official notices. The newspaper was published in Kororāreka (now known as Russell) from June to December 1840.

== History ==
The New Zealand Advertiser and Bay of Islands Gazette was New Zealand's second newspaper; the New Zealand Gazette and Wellington Spectator had first been published in Wellington on 18 April 1840. The Advertiser was a forerunner to the government's New Zealand Gazette as it was used by the colonial administration to publish official notices.

The Advertiser was published in Kororareka from 15 June to 10 December 1840 and ran for twenty-seven issues. It was printed by G. A. Eager and edited by the reverend Barzillai Quaife. The paper owed its existence to the government, which used it as their gazette. While this was its primary function, the newspaper also represented settler opinion, particularly concerning land claims. On this issue, Quaife was critical of the colonial administration.

The government responded by invoking anti-press laws instituted in New South Wales in 1827; New Zealand, at this stage was subject to New South Wales law. The cost of complying with these laws was more than the paper could bear and it suspended publication in December 1840. It seems clear that this is what the government intended. The anti-press laws had hardly been enforced and compliance was required only after Quaife started criticising the government; the Advertiser was effectively suppressed by the government for being criticised.

On 30 December 1840, the Government began publishing its own gazette, the New Zealand Gazette. In the first issue, it was claimed that the Advertiser was no longer being used for government notices because the newspaper had declined to publish them. This was greeted with disbelief by settlers, who found it hard to accept that the newspaper would turn down the very business that sustained it. The government copped much criticism for its actions from the New Zealand Gazette and Wellington Spectator, New Zealand's other newspaper at the time.

In 1842, Quaife went on to edit another newspaper, the Bay of Islands Observer. He continued to criticise government policy on land and the government responded by effectively putting him out of business, although this time with threats of libel actions.
