= Alexander Shepherd =

Alexander Shepherd may refer to:

- Alex Shepherd (Alexander James Shepherd, born 1946), Canadian Member of Parliament
- Alexander Shepherd (public servant) (c. 1797/98–1859), 2nd Colonial Treasurer of New Zealand
- Alexander Robey Shepherd (1835–1902), Governor of the District of Columbia
