= Henry Jackson (surveyor) =

New Zealand politician

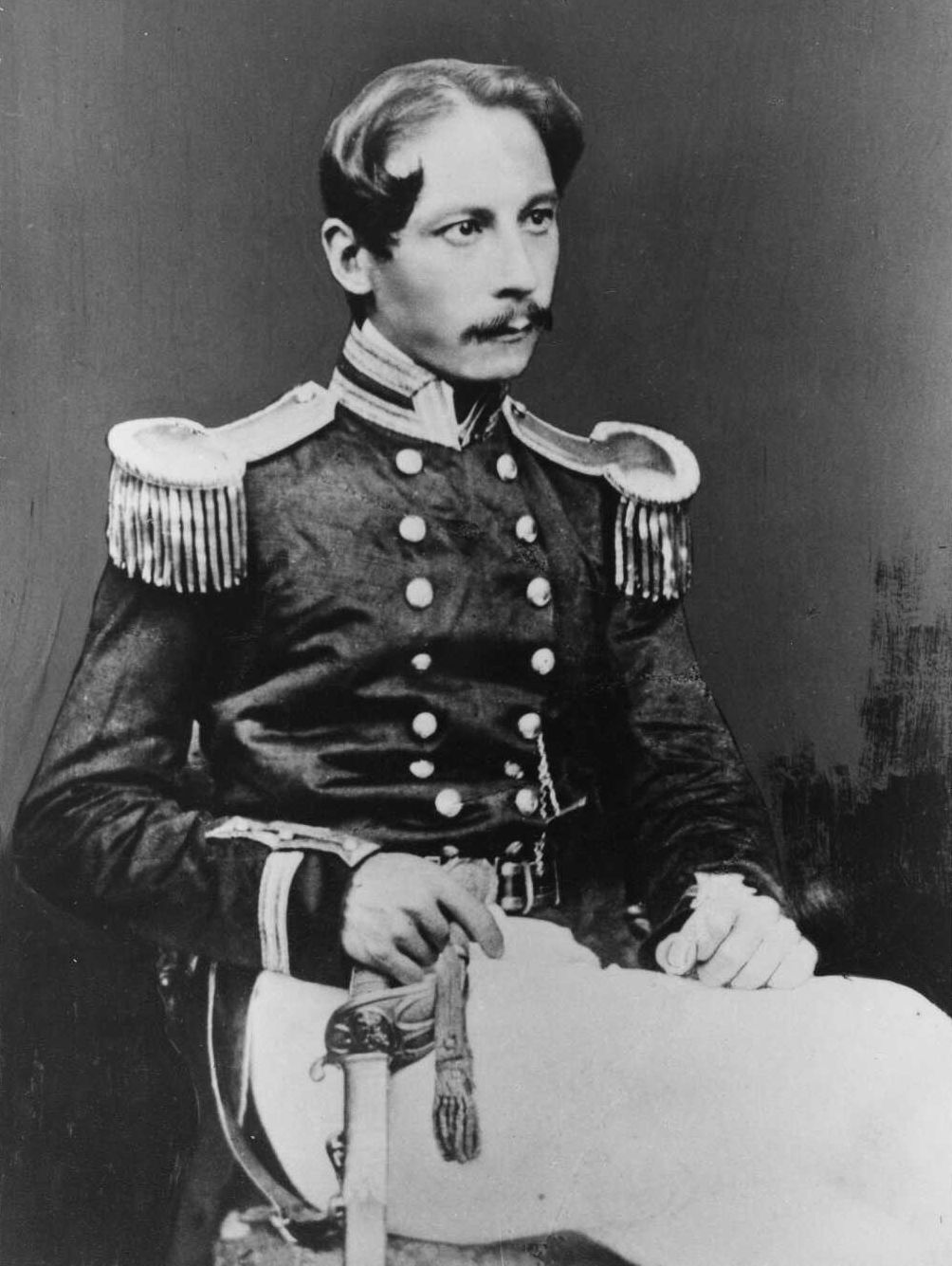
- Jackson in naval uniform, 1860s

Member of the New Zealand Parliament for Hutt
- In office 2 July 1879 – 15 August 1879
- Preceded by: William Fitzherbert
- Succeeded by: Thomas Mason

Personal details
- Born: Henry Jackson; 1830 England
- Died: 29 October 1906 (aged 76) Lower Hutt, New Zealand
- Relations: Sir John Jackson, 1st Baronet (grandfather)
- Occupation: Naval officer; surveyor

Henry Jackson (1830 – 29 October 1906) was a New Zealand politician who served as a member of the House of Representatives (M.H.R.) in the Wellington region. An officer of the Royal Indian Navy and naval surveyor, he was in New Zealand on leave of duty when control of the Indian Navy changed from the East India Company to the British government in India, following the 1857 Indian Mutiny. He worked as a surveyor and was dismissed as chief surveyor of Wellington District in 1879. He successfully stood in a parliamentary by-election but was in the House of Representatives for only one month before the house was prorogued, and lost his position in the subsequent general election.

== Early life and naval career ==
Jackson was born in England in 1830. His parents were John Jackson and Honoria Anna Maria Jackson, who both died at Hutt Valley within a week of one another in May and June 1869. His grandfather was Sir John Jackson, 1st Baronet, who was chairman of the board of the East India Company. He received his education at York Mechanics' Institute. Aged 15, he joined the Royal Indian Navy and during his 17 years of service, he advanced from midshipman to lieutenant. During his time in the navy, he trained as a surveyor. When he was in charge of the survey ship Krishna, one of his naval surveys was that of the Cocos channel, the water between Burma to the north and the Andaman and Nicobar Islands to the south. He was part of the group of surveyors under Fenwick Williams that defined the boundary between the Ottoman Empire and Persia. As part of that survey, he rode from the Persian Gulf to Mount Ararat and from there to Trabzon (then known as Trebizond) on the Black Sea. For the next three years, he worked at Constantinople to document that work. He travelled extensively in Persia, Armenia, and India. Apart from his native English, he spoke French, Arabic, Persian, and Hindi.

== New Zealand career ==
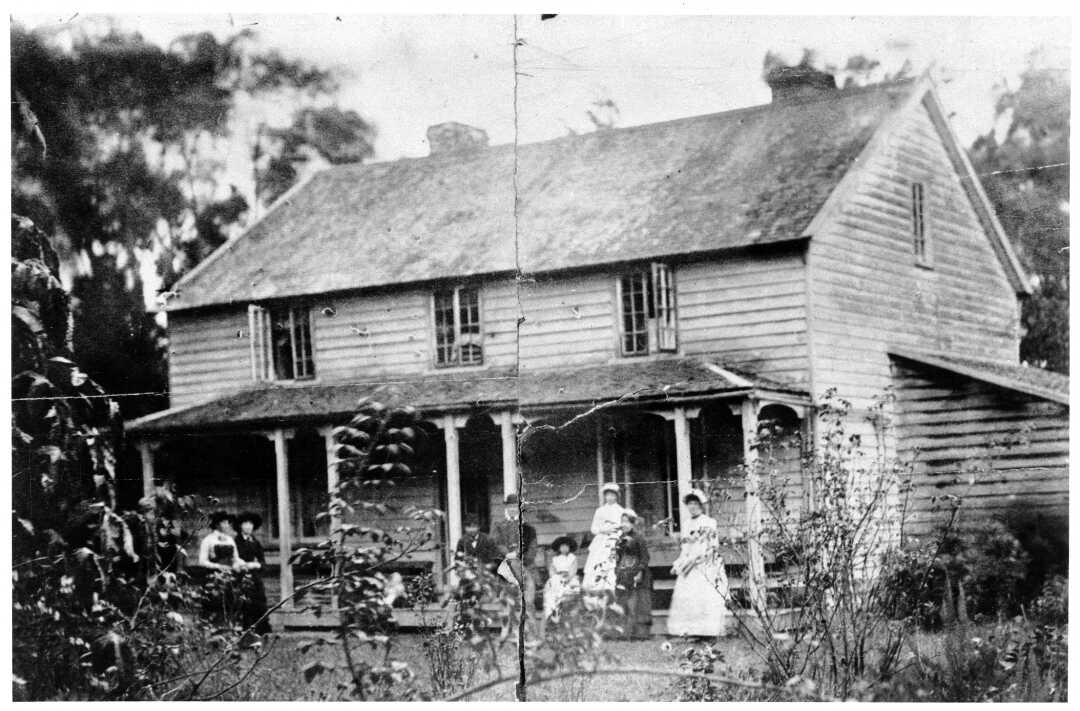
Jackson's house, Blackbridge, in Lower Hutt

Jackson was in New Zealand on a two-year furlough from 1862 to visit his parents. During that time, the Indian Navy was disestablished. He was appointed to the New Zealand Survey Department in September 1862, not long after he arrived in New Zealand. After three years as a district surveyor, he became chief surveyor of Wellington Province. After the abolition of the provincial system, Jackson was chief surveyor of the Wellington District until he was dismissed in March 1879 via a notice in the Gazette. In October 1880 following a petition to parliament, the dismissal was cancelled by the acting governor-general and converted into a resignation.

New Zealand Parliament
Years	Term	Electorate	Party
1879	6th	Hutt	Independent

On 14 June 1879, William Fitzherbert resigned his membership of the House of Representatives, where he represented the Hutt electorate, to take up the speakership of the New Zealand Legislative Council. The resulting 2 July 1879 by-election was contested by Thomas Mason and Jackson, with The Evening Post pointing out that the candidates had near-identical political views. Jackson won the by-election by a large margin.

Jackson represented the Hutt electorate from this by-election to the 1879 general election. His period of service was 2 July to 15 August; he was a member of the House of Representatives for 44 days, the shortest period of any New Zealand MP. Jackson was sworn in on 11 July 1879 when the fourth session of the sixth parliament started. The sixth parliament was dissolved on 11 August 1879.

On 2 September, Jackson and Mason put their candidacies forward for the 1879 general election. At the election a week later, which had a slightly higher turnout, Mason unexpectedly won. At the 1881 election in the Hutt electorate, Jackson was one of four candidates but the incumbent retained the seat.

In April 1886, Jackson was appointed judge of the Assessment Court (a court that set land values for rating purposes). The area covered included the town districts of Johnsonville, Kaiwarra, Lower Hutt, and Petone. He also served as a justice of the peace for about 30 years, and was one of the first members of the Wellington College board of governors.

== Family ==
Jackson's eldest daughter, Edith Emily, married the third son of Jabez Waterhouse, Rowland Skipsey, at St James' Church in Lower Hutt in February 1883. His eldest son, Reginald Jackson, became a lawyer.

Jackson died at his home in Lower Hutt from a cold on 29 October 1906. He was survived by his wife, six sons, and two daughters. He was buried at the St James churchyard. His wife died in November 1914.

New Zealand Parliament
Preceded by William Fitzherbert	Member of Parliament for Hutt; 1879	Succeeded by Thomas Mason
