= 1879 Hutt by-election =

New Zealand by-election

The 1879 Hutt by-election was a by-election held in the single-member Hutt electorate during the 6th New Zealand Parliament, on 2 July 1879.

The by-election was caused by the resignation of the incumbent MP William Fitzherbert when he was appointed to the Legislative Council. He was replaced by Henry Jackson.

== Results ==
1879 Hutt by-election
Party	Candidate	Votes	%	±%
Independent	Henry Jackson	183	68.54	
Independent	Thomas Mason	84	31.46	
Majority		99	37.08	
Turnout		267		
