= Alfred Renall =

New Zealand politician (1813–1902)

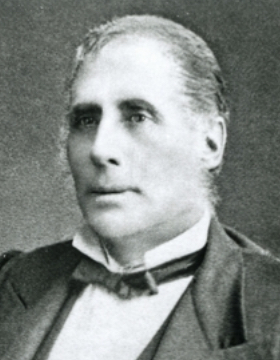
Renall, c. 1860

Alfred William Renall (1813 – 30 January 1902) was a 19th-century Member of Parliament in the Hutt Valley and Wairarapa, New Zealand.

New Zealand Parliament
Years	Term	Electorate	Party
1858–1860	2nd	Hutt	Independent
1860–1866	3rd	Hutt	Independent

He represented the Hutt Valley electorate of Hutt from 1858 to 1866 when he retired.

He had been a Mayor of Masterton (1880–81), a member of the Wellington Provincial Council (elected to the first session in 1853), and a flour-miller.

He died in Masterton aged 88, having been an invalid for the last five years and bed-ridden for two years.

New Zealand Parliament
Preceded by Dillon Bell; Samuel Revans	Member of Parliament for Hutt; 1858–1866; Served alongside: William Fitzherbert	Succeeded by Alfred Ludlam
