= Eastern Hutt =

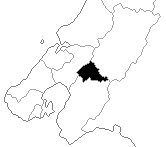
Eastern Hutt electorate boundaries between 1993 and 1996.

Eastern Hutt is a former New Zealand parliamentary electorate from 1978 to 1996. It was represented by two Labour MPs.

== Population centres ==
The 1977 electoral redistribution was the most overtly political since the Representation Commission had been established through an amendment to the Representation Act in 1886, initiated by Muldoon's National Government. As part of the 1976 census, a large number of people failed to fill out an electoral re-registration card, and census staff had not been given the authority to insist on the card being completed. This had little practical effect for people on the general roll, but it transferred Māori to the general roll if the card was not handed in. Together with a northward shift of New Zealand's population, this resulted in five new electorates having to be created in the upper part of the North Island. The electoral redistribution was very disruptive, and 22 electorates were abolished, while 27 electorates were newly created (including Eastern Hutt) or re-established. These changes came into effect for the 1978 election.

In the 1977 electoral redistribution, the existing Western Hutt moved west, and the Eastern Hutt electorate was formed from areas that previously belonged to Western Hutt and the Hutt electorate, the latter of which was abolished. The Eastern Hutt electorate incorporated the eastern part of Lower Hutt in the Hutt Valley up to the suburb of Haywards in the north. In the 1983 electoral redistribution, the northern part of the electorate transferred to the Western Hutt electorate (including Haywards) and the electorate moved slightly further east.

== History ==
In the 1978 election, the Eastern Hutt electorate was won by Trevor Young, who had been MP for the Hutt electorate since 1968. Young retired at the 1990 election and was succeeded by Paul Swain. When Eastern Hutt was replaced in 1996 by the Hutt South electorate, Swain transferred to the Rimutaka electorate to the north of Hutt South.

=== Members of Parliament ===
The electorate was represented by two Labour MPs.

Key

Labour

| Election | Winner |
|---|---|
| 1978 election | Trevor Young |
| 1981 election | Trevor Young |
| 1984 election | Trevor Young |
| 1987 election | Trevor Young |
| 1990 election | Paul Swain |
| 1993 election | Paul Swain |
(Electorate abolished in 1996; see Hutt South)

== Election results ==
=== 1993 election ===
1993 general election: Eastern Hutt
| Party | Candidate | Votes | % | ±% |
|---|---|---|---|---|
| Labour | Paul Swain | 9,346 | 51.32 | +4.77 |
| National | Peter MacMillan | 4,628 | 25.41 | |
| Alliance | Irene Ruth | 2,467 | 13.54 | +4.56 |
| NZ First | Makere Jordan | 1,000 | 5.49 | |
| Christian Heritage | Wayne Chapman | 526 | 2.88 | |
| McGillicuddy Serious | Karen Anne Nicholls | 150 | 0.82 | |
| Independent | Philip McHale | 54 | 0.29 | |
| Natural Law | Marie-Louise Hodgson | 37 | 0.20 | |
| Majority | | 4,718 | 25.91 | +21.43 |
| Turnout | | 18,208 | 83.13 | +1.04 |
| Registered electors | | 21,901 | | |

=== 1990 election ===
1990 general election: Eastern Hutt
| Party | Candidate | Votes | % | ±% |
|---|---|---|---|---|
| Labour | Paul Swain | 8,312 | 46.55 | |
| National | Rosemary Thomas | 7,511 | 42.06 | |
| NewLabour | Irene Ruth | 1,605 | 8.98 | |
| Democrats | M L Baird | 426 | 2.38 | |
| Majority | | 801 | 4.48 | |
| Turnout | | 17,854 | 82.09 | −3.66 |
| Registered electors | | 21,749 | | |

=== 1987 election ===
1987 general election: Eastern Hutt
| Party | Candidate | Votes | % | ±% |
|---|---|---|---|---|
| Labour | Trevor Young | 10,977 | 60.05 | +4.49 |
| National | Penn Pattison | 6,237 | 34.12 | |
| Democrats | Trevor Barnard | 1,064 | 5.82 | |
| Majority | | 4,740 | 25.93 | −4.92 |
| Turnout | | 18,278 | 85.75 | −6.04 |
| Registered electors | | 21,314 | | |

=== 1984 election ===
1984 general election: Eastern Hutt
| Party | Candidate | Votes | % | ±% |
|---|---|---|---|---|
| Labour | Trevor Young | 10,816 | 55.56 | +0.86 |
| National | Joy McLauchlan | 4,811 | 24.71 | |
| NZ Party | Maureen Harvey | 2,832 | 14.54 | |
| Social Credit | Ian McRae | 1,005 | 5.16 | −11.80 |
| Majority | | 6,005 | 30.85 | +4.28 |
| Turnout | | 19,464 | 91.79 | +1.86 |
| Registered electors | | 21,203 | | |

=== 1981 election ===
1981 general election: Eastern Hutt
| Party | Candidate | Votes | % | ±% |
|---|---|---|---|---|
| Labour | Trevor Young | 10,335 | 54.80 | −2.13 |
| National | Alex Duthie | 5,324 | 28.23 | |
| Social Credit | Ian McRae | 3,199 | 16.96 | +4.16 |
| Majority | | 5,011 | 26.57 | −2.17 |
| Turnout | | 18,858 | 89.93 | +18.09 |
| Registered electors | | 20,969 | | |

=== 1978 election ===
1978 general election: Eastern Hutt
| Party | Candidate | Votes | % | ±% |
|---|---|---|---|---|
| Labour | Trevor Young | 10,640 | 56.93 | |
| National | Rosemary Young | 5,267 | 28.18 | |
| Social Credit | Ian McRae | 2,394 | 12.80 | |
| Values | Malcolm White | 400 | 2.14 | |
| Independent | M E Gee | 168 | 0.89 | |
| Majority | | 5,373 | 28.74 | |
| Turnout | | 18,689 | 71.84 | |
| Registered electors | | 26,012 | | |
