= Henry Samuel Fitzherbert =

New Zealand politician

New Zealand Parliament
Years	Term	Electorate	Party
1884–1887	9th	Hutt	Independent
1887–1890	10th	Hutt	Independent

Henry Samuel Fitzherbert (11 September 1851 – 5 February 1912) was a 19th-century Member of Parliament in Wellington, New Zealand and a lawyer.

He was educated at Christ's College, Christchurch and Melbourne University. He was a lawyer in Wellington and Palmerston North, and later a magistrate in New Plymouth.

He represented the Hutt electorate from 1884 to 1890, when he retired.

He was the younger son of William Fitzherbert. His brother William Alfred Fitzherbert was mayor of Lower Hutt. His sister Alice married Sir Patrick Buckley.

New Zealand Parliament
Preceded by Thomas Mason	Member of Parliament for Hutt; 1884–1890	Succeeded by Alfred Newman
