= Hutt (electorate) =

Hutt was a New Zealand parliamentary electorate. It was one of the original electorates in 1853 and existed during two periods until 1978. It was represented by 13 Members of Parliament.

== Population centres ==
The Representation Act 1900 had increased the membership of the House of Representatives from general electorates 70 to 76, and this was implemented through the 1902 electoral redistribution. In 1902, changes to the country quota affected the three-member electorates in the four main centres. The tolerance between electorates was increased to ±1,250 so that the Representation Commissions (since 1896, there had been separate commissions for the North and South Islands) could take greater account of communities of interest. These changes proved very disruptive to existing boundaries, and six electorates were established for the first time, and two electorates that previously existed were re-established, including Hutt.

The main population centre in the electorate was the city of Lower Hutt in the Hutt Valley.

== History ==
The Hutt seat first existed from 1853 to 1870 as a two-member electorate.

At the opening of the 6th session of the 2nd Parliament on 10 April 1858, the speaker read out 14 resignations, including those of Dillon Bell and Samuel Revans. Bell moved to Otago and continued his political career there. On 31 July 1858, a by-election was held, and Alfred Renall and William Fitzherbert were returned.

From 1871 onwards, the electorate was a single-member constituency. Fitzherbert contested the general election on 29 December 1875 against Hutchison and obtained 178 votes, with Hutchison receiving 38. He retained the Hutt electorate until his resignation in 1879, so that he could appointed to the Legislative Council. H. Jackson won the resulting by-election against T. Mason, but Mason was successful against Jackson at the 1879 general election a few months later.

The electorate was abolished in 1893.

In 1902 the seat was recreated and was won by the Liberal leader Thomas Wilford. His party allegiance changed to the United Party, which took over from the Liberal Party by 1928. He resigned in 1929, and the ensuing by-election was won by Walter Nash. Nash became Minister of Finance and Prime Minister, who died in 1968. The seat was then held by Trevor Young, also for Labour.

When the seat was split into Eastern Hutt and Western Hutt in 1978, Young won the new Eastern Hutt seat for Labour.

=== Members of Parliament ===
Key:

Independent Conservative Liberal United Labour

==== 1853 to 1870 ====
From 1853 to 1870, Hutt was a two-member electorate represented by six Members of Parliament:

Election	Winners	
1853 election	Edward Gibbon Wakefield	Alfred Ludlam
1855 election	Francis Dillon Bell	Alfred Ludlam
1856 by-election	Francis Dillon Bell	Samuel Revans
1858 by-election	William Fitzherbert	Alfred Renall
1860 election	William Fitzherbert	Alfred Renall
1866 election	William Fitzherbert	Alfred Ludlam

==== 1871 to 1893 ====
From 1871 to 1893, the electorate was represented by a further four Members of Parliament, with Fitzherbert continuing his term:

Election	Winner
1871 election	William Fitzherbert
1875 election	William Fitzherbert
1879 by-election	Henry Jackson
1879 election	Thomas Mason
1881 election	Thomas Mason
1884 election	Henry Samuel Fitzherbert
1887 election	Henry Samuel Fitzherbert
1890 election	Alfred Newman
(Electorate abolished 1893)

==== 1902 to 1978 ====
From 1902 to 1978, the electorate was represented by three Members of Parliament:

Election	Winner
1902 election	Thomas Wilford
1905 election	Thomas Wilford
1908 election	Thomas Wilford
1911 election	Thomas Wilford
1914 election	Thomas Wilford
1919 election	Thomas Wilford
1922 election	Thomas Wilford
1925 election	Thomas Wilford
1928 election	Thomas Wilford
1929 by-election	Walter Nash
1931 election	Walter Nash
1935 election	Walter Nash
1938 election	Walter Nash
1943 election	Walter Nash
1946 election	Walter Nash
1949 election	Walter Nash
1951 election	Walter Nash
1954 election	Walter Nash
1957 election	Walter Nash
1960 election	Walter Nash
1963 election	Walter Nash
1966 election	Walter Nash
1968 by-election	Trevor Young
1969 election	Trevor Young
1972 election	Trevor Young
1975 election	Trevor Young
(Electorate abolished 1978; see Western Hutt and Eastern Hutt)

== Election results ==
=== 1975 election ===
1975 general election: Hutt
Party	Candidate	Votes	%	±%
Labour	Trevor Young	9,540	48.10	−7.20
National	Brett Newell	8,521	42.96	
Social Credit	Noel Riches	985	4.96	
Values	Paul Irik	785	3.95	
Majority		1,019	5.13	−12.73
Turnout		19,831	83.29	−8.53
Registered electors		23,808		

=== 1972 election ===
1972 general election: Hutt
Party	Candidate	Votes	%	±%
Labour	Trevor Young	10,516	55.30	+2.39
National	Michael Fowler	7,119	37.43	
Social Credit	Annette Harvey	719	3.78	
Values	Max Overton	595	3.12	
New Democratic	Kenneth George Hurren	67	0.35	
Majority		3,397	17.86	+7.27
Turnout		19,016	91.82	+2.09
Registered electors		20,709		

=== 1969 election ===
1969 general election: Hutt
Party	Candidate	Votes	%	±%
Labour	Trevor Young	8,861	52.91	+5.12
National	Don Lee	7,086	42.31	
Social Credit	Graeme Constable	637	3.80	
Independent	Nick Ursin	162	0.96	−1.40
Majority		1,775	10.59	−0.56
Turnout		16,746	89.73	+21.69
Registered electors		18,661		

=== 1968 by-election ===
1968 Hutt by-election
Party	Candidate	Votes	%	±%
Labour	Trevor Young	5,968	47.79	
National	John Kennedy-Good	4,576	36.64	−2.24
Social Credit	Tom Weal	1,649	5.18	
Independent	Nick Ursin	295	2.36	
Majority		1,392	11.15	
Turnout		12,488	68.04	−18.74
Registered electors		18,354		
Labour hold		Swing		

=== 1966 election ===
1966 general election: Hutt
Party	Candidate	Votes	%	±%
Labour	Sir Walter Nash	7,861	51.70	−6.91
National	John Kennedy-Good	5,912	38.88	
Social Credit	Christina Dalglish	1,431	9.41	
Majority		1,949	12.81	−11.30
Turnout		15,204	86.78	−2.47
Registered electors		17,520		

=== 1963 election ===
1963 general election: Hutt
Party	Candidate	Votes	%	±%
Labour	Walter Nash	8,865	58.61	+4.35
National	Vere Hampson-Tinadale	5,217	34.49	
Social Credit	Donald Milne	972	6.42	−0.68
Majority		3,648	24.11	+7.37
Turnout		15,125	89.25	−0.05
Registered electors		16,945		

=== 1960 election ===
1960 general election: Hutt
Party	Candidate	Votes	%	±%
Labour	Walter Nash	7,614	54.26	−8.37
National	George Barker	5,265	37.52	
Social Credit	Donald Milne	997	7.10	+1.47
Independent	George Wain	115	0.81	
Communist	Ralph Hegman	40	0.28	
Majority		2,349	16.74	−14.17
Turnout		14,031	89.30	−3.85
Registered electors		15,712		

=== 1957 election ===
1957 general election: Hutt
Party	Candidate	Votes	%	±%
Labour	Walter Nash	8,975	62.63	+2.37
National	Lance Adams-Schneider	4,545	31.72	
Social Credit	Donald Milne	808	5.63	
Majority		4,430	30.91	+4.41
Turnout		14,328	93.15	+4.91
Registered electors		15,381		

=== 1954 election ===
1954 general election: Hutt
Party	Candidate	Votes	%	±%
Labour	Walter Nash	8,371	60.26	+2.53
National	Clevedon Costello	4,690	33.76	
Social Credit	Terry Maddison	829	5.96	
Majority		3,681	26.50	+11.88
Turnout		13,890	88.24	−1.30
Registered electors		15,740		

=== 1951 election ===
1951 general election: Hutt
Party	Candidate	Votes	%	±%
Labour	Walter Nash	8,872	57.73	+0.05
National	Jack Andrews	6,424	41.80	
World Socialist	Thomas Simpson	71	0.46	−0.24
Majority		2,248	14.62	−1.46
Turnout		15,367	89.54	−1.75
Registered electors		17,161		

=== 1949 election ===
1949 general election: Hutt
Party	Candidate	Votes	%	±%
Labour	Walter Nash	8,153	57.68	−0.99
National	Horace Leonard Heatley	5,880	41.60	
World Socialist	Thomas Simpson	100	0.70	+0.34
Majority		2,273	16.08	−2.83
Turnout		14,133	91.29	−1.51
Registered electors		15,480		

=== 1946 election ===
1946 general election: Hutt
Party	Candidate	Votes	%	±%
Labour	Walter Nash	8,025	58.67	−2.20
National	Jim Vogel	5,438	39.76	
Independent Labour	George Laing	163	1.19	
World Socialist	Thomas Simpson	50	0.36	
Majority		2,587	18.91	−17.38
Turnout		13,676	92.80	−1.13
Registered electors		14,737		

=== 1943 election ===
1943 general election: Hutt
Party	Candidate	Votes	%	±%
Labour	Walter Nash	8,823	60.87	+11.97
Real Democracy	John H. Hogan	3,563	24.58	
National	Norman Percival Croft	3,017	20.81	
Democratic Labour	Patrick Connors	437	3.01	
Informal votes		178	1.22	+0.45
Majority		5,260	36.29	−10.15
Turnout		16,018	93.93	−2.00
Registered electors		17,052		

=== 1938 election ===
1938 general election: Hutt
Party	Candidate	Votes	%	±%
Labour	Walter Nash	10,687	72.84	−1.41
National	Jack Andrews	3,873	26.39	
Majority		6,814	46.44	+2.07
Informal votes		114	0.77	−0.74
Turnout		14,671	95.93	+6.05
Registered electors		15,292		

=== 1935 election ===
1935 general election: Hutt
Party	Candidate	Votes	%	±%
Labour	Walter Nash	11,873	74.25	+15.17
Reform	Victor Jacobsen	4,116	25.74	
Informal votes		243	1.51	+0.77
Majority		7,757	48.51	+30.36
Turnout		15,989	89.88	+2.90
Registered electors		17,788		

=== 1931 election ===
1931 general election: Hutt
Party	Candidate	Votes	%	±%
Labour	Walter Nash	9,187	59.08	+18.54
United	James Kerr (Note: For some biographical details of James Kerr refer to his father's article.)	6,364	40.92	+2.09
Informal votes		116	0.74	
Majority		2,823	18.15	+16.45
Turnout		15,667	86.98	+3.39
Registered electors		18,013		

Table footnotes:

=== 1929 by-election ===
1929 Hutt by-election
Party	Candidate	Votes	%	±%
Labour	Walter Nash	5,047	40.53	−4.55
United	James Kerr (Note: For some biographical details of Kerr refer to his father's article.)	4,835	38.83	
Reform	Harold Johnston (Note: For some biographical details of Johnston refer to his father's article.)	2,570	20.64	
Majority		212	1.70	−8.14
Informal votes		103	0.82	−1.31
Turnout		12,555	84.27	−6.67
Registered electors		14,898		

Table footnotes:

=== 1928 election ===
1928 general election: Hutt
Party	Candidate	Votes	%	±%
United	Thomas Wilford	7,283	54.92	−3.21
Labour	Walter Nash	5,978	45.08	+4.10
Informal votes		288	2.13	+1.26
Majority		1,305	9.84	−7.31
Turnout		13,549	90.95	−0.9
Registered electors		14,898		

=== 1925 election ===
1925 general election: Hutt
Party	Candidate	Votes	%	±%
Liberal	Thomas Wilford	6,080	58.13	+16.98
Labour	Walter Nash	4,286	40.98	
Informal votes		92	0.87	+0.01
Majority		1,794	17.15	+8.25
Turnout		10,458	91.04	−0.17
Registered electors		11,487		

=== 1922 election ===
1922 general election: Hutt
Party	Candidate	Votes	%	±%
Liberal	Thomas Wilford	3,707	41.15	−0.44
Labour	David Pritchard	2,905	32.25	+2.87
Reform	Henry Bennett	2,317	25.72	
Informal votes		78	0.86	+0.04
Majority		802	8.90	−3.31
Turnout		9,007	91.21	+8.77
Registered electors		9,874		

=== 1919 election ===
1919 general election: Hutt
Party	Candidate	Votes	%	±%
Liberal	Thomas Wilford	3,422	41.59	−15.13
Labour	David Pritchard	2,417	29.38	
Reform	Percy Rishworth	2,319	28.19	
Informal votes		68	0.82	−1.21
Majority		1,005	12.21	−1.24
Turnout		8,226	82.44	−0.59
Registered electors		9,983		

=== 1914 election ===
1914 general election: Hutt
Party	Candidate	Votes	%	±%
Liberal	Thomas Wilford	3,977	56.72	−6.39
United Labour	Albert Samuel	3,034	43.27	
Informal votes		143	2.03	+0.69
Majority		943	13.45	−14.55
Turnout		7,011	83.03	+0.57
Registered electors		8,443		

=== 1911 election ===
1911 general election: Hutt, First ballot
Party	Candidate	Votes	%	±%
Liberal	Thomas Wilford	3,471	50.33	−11.27
Labour	Michael Reardon	1,540	22.33	
Independent	John McEwan	911	13.21	
Reform	Richard Shortt	881	12.77	−23.66
Informal votes		93	1.34	−0.52
Majority		1,931	28.00	+2.83
Turnout		6,896	83.60	+5.15
Registered electors		8,248		

=== 1908 election ===
1908 general election: Hutt, First ballot
Party	Candidate	Votes	%	±%
Liberal	Thomas Wilford	3,764	61.60	+7.08
Conservative	Richard Shortt	2,226	36.43	
Informal votes		120	1.96	+1.05
Majority		1,538	25.17	+6.67
Turnout		6,110	78.45	−3.97
Registered electors		7,788		

=== 1905 election ===
1905 general election: Hutt
Party	Candidate	Votes	%	±%
Liberal	Thomas Wilford	3,452	57.49	+2.97
New Liberal	George Yerex	1,540	25.64	
Independent	George London	957	15.93	
Informal votes		55	0.91	
Majority		1,912	31.84	+20.48
Turnout		6,004	82.42	+5.83
Registered electors		7,284		

=== 1902 election ===
1902 general election: Hutt
Party	Candidate	Votes	%	±%
Liberal	Thomas Wilford	2,115	54.52	
Independent Liberal	Frederick Pirani	1,674	43.15	
Independent	Joseph Collier	90	2.32	
Majority		441	11.36	
Turnout		3,879	76.59	
Registered electors		5,064		

=== 1890 election ===
1890 general election: Hutt
Party	Candidate	Votes	%	±%
Conservative	Alfred Newman	680	42.63	
Liberal	George Thomas London	502	31.47	
Independent	Charles Beard Izard	413	25.89	
Majority		178	11.15	
Turnout		1,595	66.45	
Registered electors		2,400		

=== 1858 by-election ===
1858 Hutt by-election
Party	Candidate	Votes	%	±%
Independent	William Fitzherbert	229	30.29	−
Independent	Alfred Renall	228	30.16	−
Independent	George Hart	153	20.24	−
Independent	Peter Cheyne	146	19.31	−
Majority		75 (Note: Majority is the difference between lowest winning poll (Renall: 228) and highest losing poll (Hart: 153))	9.92	−
Total votes		756	-	-

Table footnotes:

=== 1856 by-election ===
1856 Hutt by-election
Party	Candidate	Votes	%	±%
Independent	Samuel Revans	96	80.0	
Independent	George Hart	24	20.0	
Turnout		120		
Majority		72		
