= George Cooper (public servant) =

Customs official and administrator (1793–1867)

Honourable George Cooper
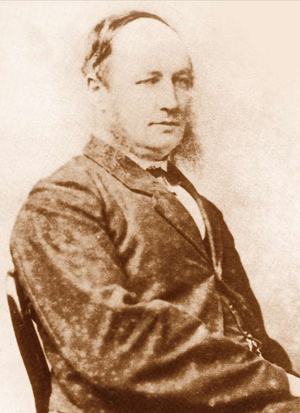

1st Colonial Treasurer
- In office 5 January 1840 – 9 May 1842
- Succeeded by: Alexander Shepherd

Executive Council of New Zealand
- In office 3 May 1841 – 9 May 1842

New Zealand Legislative Council
- In office 24 May 1841 – 9 May 1842

Personal details
- Born: 23 June 1793 Kildare, County Kildare, Ireland
- Died: 7 April 1867 (aged 73) Geelong, Victoria
- Spouse: Emily Buck
- Children: George Sisson Cooper, Shaftesbury Cooper

George Cooper (23 June 1793 – 7 April 1867) was a customs official and government administrator in Ireland, England, Australia and New Zealand. He was the first Colonial Treasurer and head of Customs of New Zealand.

== Biography ==
Cooper was born in County Kildare, Ireland, in 1793. He started work in 1816 as a customs agent for Ireland and England. He emigrated to New South Wales, arriving Sydney on 12 October 1836 aboard the Hoogley with his wife and children. Later that month he was officially appointed Comptroller and Landing Surveyor in the Department of Customs for the colony. In NSW, he also became Superintendent of Distilleries. He built, or leased, Waterview House, the first house in Balmain, and bought 50 acres of surrounding land on the Balmain Peninsula. He got into financial difficulties in the 1840 depression and became insolvent.

He was appointed Colonial Treasurer and Collector of Customs for New Zealand on 5 January 1840. Later that month he moved to the Bay of Islands in the north of New Zealand, arriving aboard HMS Herald with William Hobson and other officials (including Willoughby Shortland and Felton Mathew). His annual salary was £600, the same as it was in Sydney. He was a witness and signatory to the Treaty of Waitangi. When the General Legislative Council was formed in May 1841, Cooper became a member due to his role as treasurer. In May 1842, he resigned from his position as Colonial Treasurer and returned to Sydney.

Cooper was later secretary and treasurer to the Shire of Ballan west of Melbourne from 1863 till 1867. His health deteriorated for the last two years of his life. He died in Geelong, Victoria, on 7 April 1867, at the home of his son-in-law. His son, George Sisson Cooper, had a long career in the New Zealand civil service; from 1870 to 1892, he was Under-Secretary for the colony.

== Legacy ==
Cooper was a beekeeper and was one of the first who tried to establish honeybees in New Zealand. Fellow beekeeper, William Cotton, noted that Cooper arrived in Auckland in October 1842 with a hive of bees "seemingly dead" after a stormy ten-day passage from Sydney.

There is a Cooper Street in Balmain on part of the land he once owned.

== Notes ==
Political offices
New office	Colonial Treasurer; 1840–1842	Succeeded by Alexander Shepherd
