= Trevor Young =

New Zealand politician (1925-2012)

Trevor Young QSO
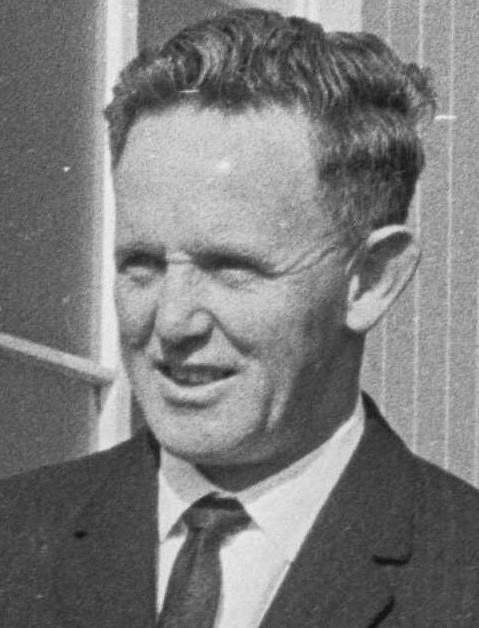
- Young in 1968

Member of the New Zealand Parliament for Eastern Hutt
- In office 25 November 1978 – 27 October 1990
- Preceded by: new constituency
- Succeeded by: Paul Swain

Member of the New Zealand Parliament for Hutt
- In office 3 August 1968 – 25 November 1978
- Preceded by: Walter Nash
- Succeeded by: seat abolished

Personal details
- Born: 28 August 1925 Turua, New Zealand
- Died: 13 May 2012 (aged 86) Lower Hutt, New Zealand
- Party: Labour
- Spouse: Ailsa Hazel Anderson (m. 1952)
- Children: 2

Trevor James Young QSO (28 August 1925 – 13 May 2012) was a New Zealand politician of the Labour Party.

== Biography ==
=== Early life ===
Young was born in 1925 in Turua on the Hauraki Plains. The son of Leslie Robert Young, he grew up in Cambridge and Blenheim, and attended Wellington College. He married Ailsa Hazel Anderson, the daughter of John James Anderson, in 1952. They had two sons.

Young and his family settled in Naenae and he gained employment with the Public Trust. He had other jobs with the New Zealand Forest Service and Ministry of Defence before becoming the general superintendent of the New Zealand Alliance, an organisation opposed to the sale of alcoholic beverages. He studied law studies part-time at Victoria University of Wellington, graduating in 1958 with an LLB.

=== Political career ===
New Zealand Parliament
Years	Term	Electorate	Party
1968–1969	35th	Hutt	Labour
1969–1972	36th	Hutt	Labour
1972–1975	37th	Hutt	Labour
1975–1978	38th	Hutt	Labour
1978–1981	39th	Eastern Hutt	Labour
1981–1984	40th	Eastern Hutt	Labour
1984–1987	41st	Eastern Hutt	Labour
1987–1990	42nd	Eastern Hutt	Labour

Young joined the Labour Party and at the 1947 local elections, he was elected a Lower Hutt City Councillor at the age of 22. He remained a member of the city council until 1968 when he resigned upon his election to Parliament.

He represented the electorate of Hutt (previously occupied by Labour Prime Minister Sir Walter Nash) in Parliament from 1968 to 1978, and then the Eastern Hutt electorate from 1978 to 1990, when he was replaced by Paul Swain. In total he gave 43 years of service in local and national politics. He was the chair of the New Zealand branch of Parliamentarians for Global Action.

From 1974 until 1978 he was the Labour Party's junior whip. He was Shadow Minister of Energy (1976–79), Shadow Minister of Tourism (1979–80) and Shadow Minister of Police (1983–84). From 1984 to 1990 he was the deputy Chairman of Committees. According to Western Hutt MP John Terris Young was never afraid to speak his mind and his forthright manner and Christian values probably cost him political advancement.

In 1983 he faced a challenge for the Eastern Hutt nomination by electorate secretary, and former Invercargill MP, J. B. Munro. Both men were friends but differed on social policies and local members coalesced in two groups; with liberal members behind Munro while those more conservative backed Young. Prior to the selection meeting the two had agreed to avoid ill-feeling and retain their productive working relationship. The agreement was reaffirmed after Young won the vote and was given a standing ovation by the 250 members in attendance.

He was also associated with the temperance (prohibition) movement. He was likewise a member of Amnesty International and patron of the Society for the Promotion of Community Standards from 1987 to 1995.

In the 1988 Queen's Birthday Honours, Young was appointed a Companion of the Queen's Service Order for public services.

=== Later life and death ===
Young studied to learn Swedish and became a director of Ansvar Insurance. He remained politically active and even at the age of 80 was delivering leaflets and canvassing votes at the 2011 election for Rimutaka Labour MP Chris Hipkins.

On 13 May 2012, Young died at the age of 86.

== Notes ==
New Zealand Parliament
Preceded by Walter Nash	Member of Parliament for Hutt; 1968–1978	Constituency abolished
Constituency established	Member of Parliament for Eastern Hutt; 1978–1990	Succeeded by Paul Swain
Political offices
Preceded by Dail Jones	Deputy Chairman of Committees; 1984–1990	Succeeded by Robert Anderson
