= New Zealand Gazette =

New Zealand Government's official journal

New Zealand Gazette Te Kāhiti o Aotearoa
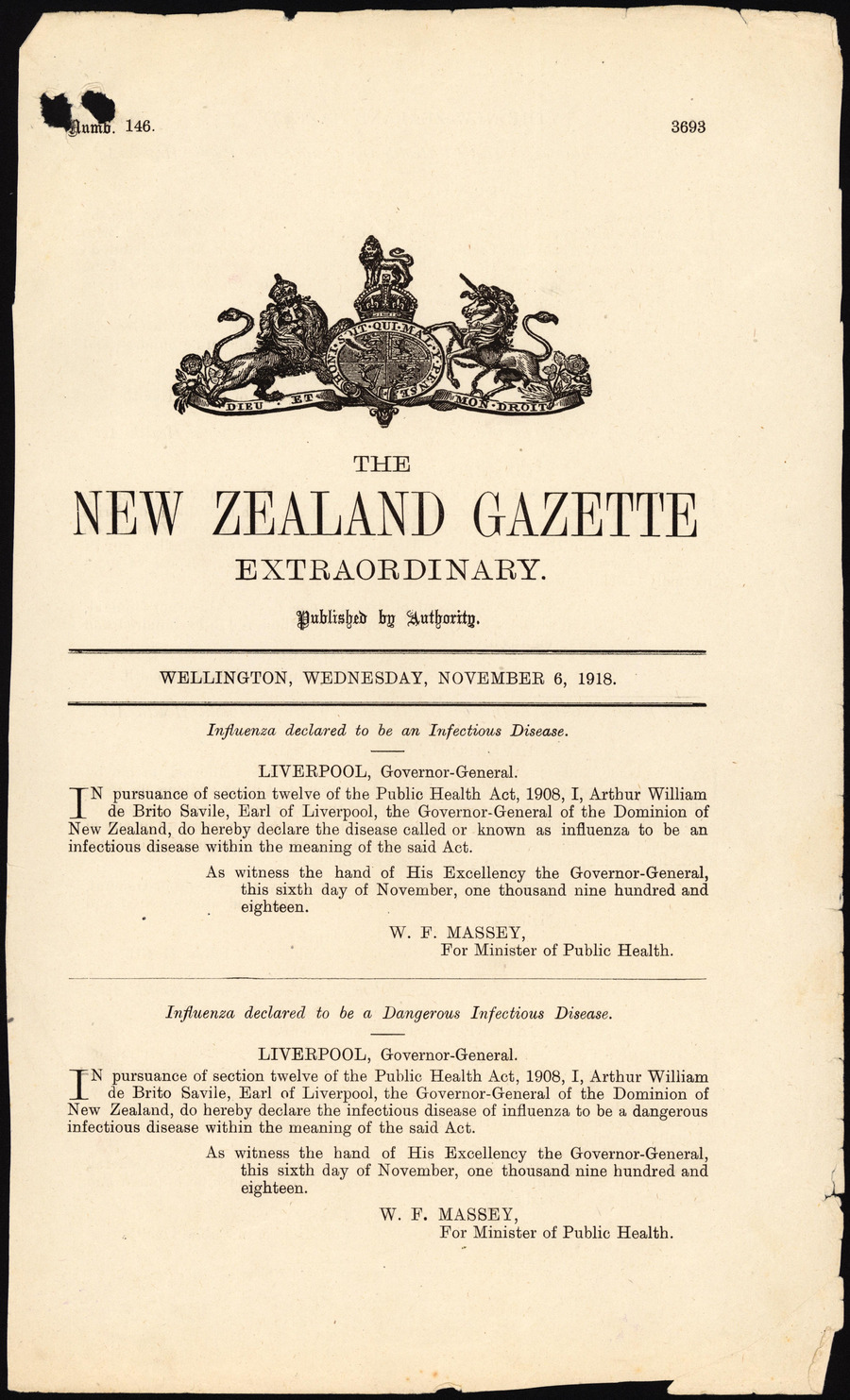
- Page 505 of the 6 November 1918 edition
- Type: Daily and continuous official journal
- Publisher: Department of Internal Affairs
- Founded: 1840
- Website: https://gazette.govt.nz/

The New Zealand Gazette (Māori: Te Kāhiti o Aotearoa), commonly referred to as the Gazette, is the government gazette, or official newspaper of record, of the New Zealand Government, serving as the medium by which decisions of Government are promulgated.

Published since 1840, it is the longest-running publication in New Zealand. In October 2014, the printed edition was replaced by an official online version, which was published every Thursday. The weekly edition ceased in October 2017, with the Gazette since being published continuously. Special editions are also published twice a year to cover the New Year Honours and King's Birthday Honours.

== Contents ==
The New Zealand Gazette, as the official newspaper and journal of the New Zealand government, publishes content such as:

- Government notices – legislation updates, viceregal information, parliamentary notices, government departmental announcements and appointments
- Commercial notices – bankruptcies, liquidations, land transfers, incorporated societies, removals from the Companies Register
- Professional notices – such as the Scopes of Practice and Prescribed Qualifications for the Practice of Medicine
- Special editions – including the New Year and King's Birthday honours lists

== Availability ==
A printed edition was published until October 2014, when it was replaced by an official online version. In October 2017, the weekly edition ceased publication, and notices are now published online continuously, between 9am and 5pm on working days. The Gazette is freely available to the public.

For much of its existence, it was printed in weekly editions, occasionally with supplementary editions such as the Customs, Professional and Trade Lists – these are no longer published.

The current official website contains all notices published since 2000. Notices published from October 1993 to 1999 are no longer available on the site. Notices published before 2000 are available by contacting the Gazette directly, via the National Library of New Zealand or by visiting certain local libraries.

== History ==
The predecessor to the New Zealand Gazette was the New Zealand Advertiser and Bay of Islands Gazette, published in Kororāreka (now Russell) during 1840. Though the Advertiser was a private newspaper, it was used by the colonial government for publishing official notices. When the editor of the Advertiser started to criticise the government for its land policy, the government responded in a way that effectively closed down the Advertiser. In the first issue of the New Zealand Gazette, it was claimed that the Advertiser was no longer being used for government notices because the newspaper had declined to publish them. This was greeted with disbelief by settlers, who found it hard to accept that the newspaper would turn down the very business that sustained it. The government copped much criticism for its actions from the New Zealand Gazette and Wellington Spectator, New Zealand's other newspaper at the time.

The first issue was published as Gazette Extraordinary on 30 December 1840. It was then the New Zealand Government Gazette from 1841 to 1847. Between 1847 and 1853 it was split into the New Zealand Government Gazette, Province of New Ulster for New Ulster (the North Island), published in Auckland, and the New Zealand Government Gazette, Province of New Munster for New Munster (the South Island), published in Wellington. In 1853 the two were reunited as the New Zealand Government Gazette. It changed to its present title on 11 August 1857.

== See also ==
- New Zealand official publications

== Notes ==
- This article incorporates text available under the CC BY 4.0 license.
