= Paul Swain (politician) =

New Zealand politician

The Honourable Paul Swain QSO
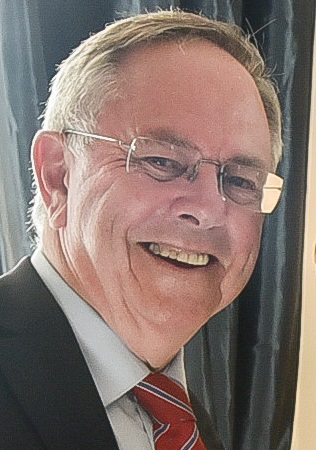
- Swain in 2020

50th Minister of Immigration
- In office 21 February 2004 – 19 October 2005
- Prime Minister: Helen Clark
- Preceded by: Lianne Dalziel
- Succeeded by: David Cunliffe

7th Minister of Corrections
- In office 19 May 2003 – 19 October 2005
- Prime Minister: Helen Clark
- Preceded by: Mark Gosche
- Succeeded by: Pete Hodgson

20th Minister of Transport
- In office 27 July 2002 – 26 February 2004
- Prime Minister: Helen Clark
- Preceded by: Mark Gosche
- Succeeded by: Damien O'Connor

5th Minister of Commerce
- In office 10 December 1999 – 15 August 2002
- Prime Minister: Helen Clark
- Preceded by: Max Bradford
- Succeeded by: Lianne Dalziel

Member of the New Zealand Parliament for Rimutaka
- In office 12 October 1996 – 8 November 2008
- Preceded by: new constituency
- Succeeded by: Chris Hipkins

Member of the New Zealand Parliament for Eastern Hutt
- In office 27 October 1990 – 12 October 1996
- Preceded by: Trevor Young
- Succeeded by: discontinued constituency

Personal details
- Born: 20 December 1951 (age 74) Palmerston North, New Zealand
- Party: Labour
- Spouse: Toni Reeves
- Children: 5

Paul Desmond Swain QSO (born 20 December 1951) is a former New Zealand politician. He was a Member of the New Zealand House of Representatives from 1990 until 2008, representing the Labour Party. From 2010 to 2019, he was a councillor on the Greater Wellington Regional Council.

== Early life ==
Swain was born in Palmerston North on 20 December 1951. He attended St. Patrick's College in Wellington. He obtained a BA from Victoria University of Wellington. Swain has two daughters and a son with his wife Toni Reeves-Swain, and two sons from an earlier marriage.

Before entering politics, he worked for the Ministry of Social Development from 1975 to 1976 before becoming a bus driver for the Wellington City Council in 1976. He then changed professions again, working as a teacher from 1978 to 1982. In 1987 he became a research officer for the New Zealand Federation of Labour (later Council of Trade Unions) until 1990 when he was elected to parliament.

He was the employee coordinator for the Wellington YMCA from 1982 to 1986 and was also chairman of the Wellington Regional Employment and ACCESS Council. At the 1986 local elections he stood for the Wellington Regional Council on the Labour Party ticket. He polled well but did not win a seat.

== Member of Parliament ==
New Zealand Parliament
Years	Term	Electorate	List	Party
1990–1993	43rd	Eastern Hutt		Labour
1993–1996	44th	Eastern Hutt		Labour
1996–1999	45th	Rimutaka	none	Labour
1999–2002	46th	Rimutaka	26	Labour
2002–2005	47th	Rimutaka	18	Labour
2005–2008	48th	Rimutaka	17	Labour

He was MP for the seat of Eastern Hutt from the 1990 election until the 1996 election, when the electorate boundaries were changed and it became Rimutaka. He won Rimutaka in 1996 and held the seat until the 2008 election, which he did not contest, retiring from national politics.

In November 1990 he was appointed as Labour's spokesperson for Forestry by Labour leader Mike Moore. In a December 1991 reshuffle Swain was given the Housing portfolio as well. He supported Helen Clark's successful leadership challenge against Moore in 1993. He retained housing and lost forestry, but later also became spokesperson for accident compensation between 1993 and 1996. From 1996 to 1999 Swain was Shadow Minister of Commerce and State Owned Enterprises. His select committee memberships included postings on the commerce committee; foreign affairs, defence and trade committee; and finance and expenditure committee.

=== Minister ===
Swain has held a number of ministerial portfolios, including Associate Minister of Finance, Minister of Commerce, Minister of Communications, Minister of Corrections, Minister of Immigration, Minister for Information Technology, Minister of Labour, Minister of Statistics, Minister for State Owned Enterprises, Minister of Transport, and Associate Minister for Economic Development.

After the 2005 election, Swain decided not to seek a Cabinet post in the new government.

== Life after politics ==
In the 2009 New Year Honours, Swain was appointed a Companion of the Queen's Service Order, for services as a Member of Parliament.

In 2009, he was employed by the Crown as their lead negotiator for a settlement of historical grievances with Ngāti Porou.

He was elected to the Greater Wellington Regional Council, in the Upper Hutt constituency, in 2010 and was re-elected in 2013 and 2016. In July 2019, Swain announced he would not seek a fourth term on the council.

In 2016, he became chairman of the New Zealand Fire Service; now Fire and Emergency New Zealand.

Political offices
Preceded by Maurice Williamson	Minister of Statistics; 1999–2000	Succeeded by Laila Harré
Preceded by John Luxton	Minister for Land Information; 1999–2000 2004	Succeeded by Matt Robson
Preceded by John Tamihere	Minister for Land Information; 1999–2000 2004	Succeeded by Pete Hodgson
Preceded by Max Bradford	Minister of Commerce; 1999–2002	Succeeded by Lianne Dalziel
Preceded by Mark Gosche	Minister of Transport; 2002–2004	Succeeded by Pete Hodgson
Preceded by Mark Gosche	Minister of Corrections; 2003–2005	Succeeded by Damien O'Connor
Preceded by Lianne Dalziel	Minister of Immigration; 2004–2005	Succeeded by David Cunliffe
New Zealand Parliament
Preceded by Trevor Young	Member of Parliament for Eastern Hutt; 1990–1996	Constituency abolished
New constituency	Member of Parliament for Rimutaka; 1996–2008	Succeeded by Chris Hipkins
