= 1968 Hutt by-election =

New Zealand by-election

← 1966 general	3 August 1968	1969 general →
- Turnout: 12,488 (68.04%)
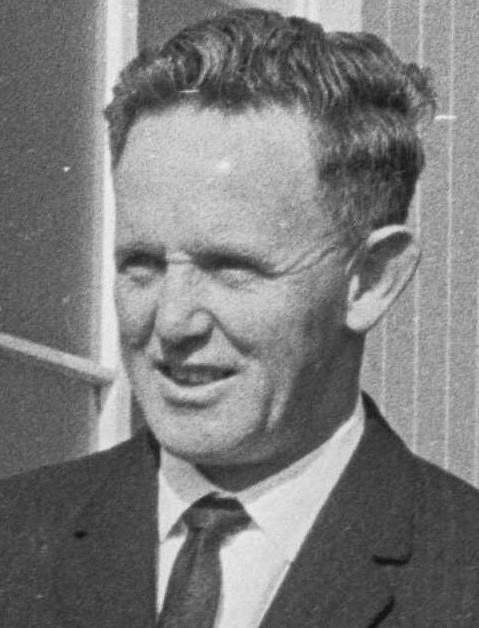

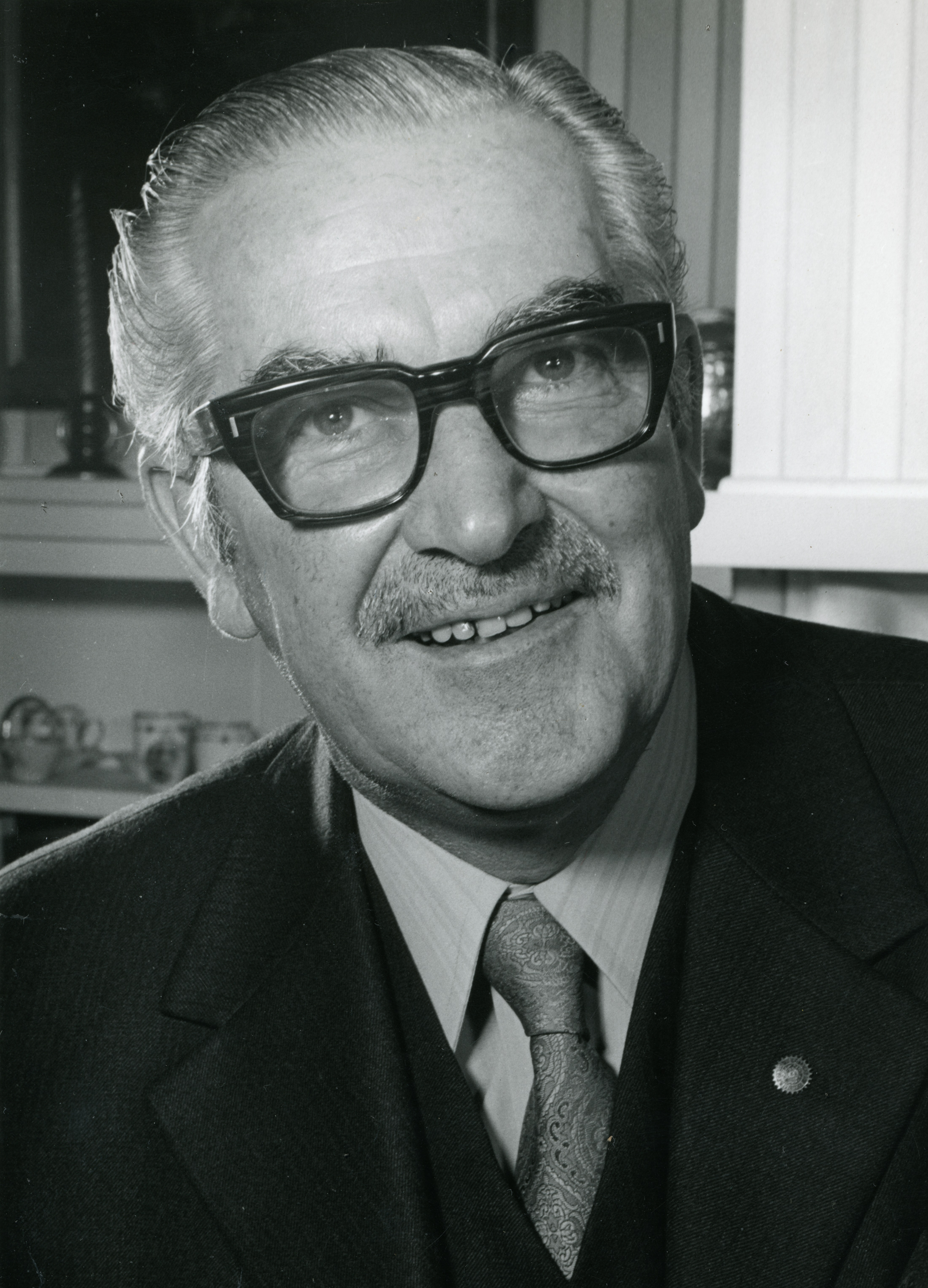
Candidate	Trevor Young	John Kennedy-Good
Party	Labour	National
Popular vote	5,968	4,576
Percentage	47.79	36.64
MP before election
Sir Walter Nash
Labour
Elected MP
Trevor Young
Labour

The Hutt by-election of 1968 was a by-election for the electorate of Hutt on 3 August 1968 during the 35th New Zealand Parliament.

The by-election resulted from the death of the previous member and former prime minister Sir Walter Nash on 4 June 1968. The contest was won by Trevor Young, also of the Labour Party. The National candidate was John Kennedy-Good, a future Mayor of Lower Hutt, who had stood for National in the previous general election.

== Background ==
Sir Walter Nash had represented the electorate since 1929 and was still MP at the age of 86 before dying after suffering a heart attack on 4 June 1968. Nash had already announced he intended to retire at the end of the parliamentary term and Trevor Young had already been selected as his successor in the seat to contest 1969 general election.

== Candidates ==
Labour

The Labour Party chose Trevor Young as their candidate. Young, a longtime Labour member, had been a Lower Hutt City Councillor since 1947. As Nash was intending to retire at the upcoming general election in 1969 Labour had already selected Young as the candidate to replace him several months earlier.

National

John Kennedy-Good was selected as the candidate of the National Party. He had been a member of the Lower Hutt City Council since 1962 and had stood in Hutt for National at the previous election in 1966.

Social Credit

The Social Credit Party selected Tom Weal, a teacher at St Peter's College, Auckland, as their candidate. He contested the Mount Albert seat in 1966.

Others

Nick Ursin, a local insurance officer, stood as an independent.

== Campaign ==
There were allegations made of bias in television coverage of the election. John Mathison, Labour MP for Avon, made a speech in parliament where he criticised the state-owned and operated New Zealand Broadcasting Corporation (NZBC) running a nationwide news programme featuring coverage of Prime Minister Keith Holyoake and the National candidate John Kennedy-Good. However, the programme did not feature any footage of Leader of the Opposition Norman Kirk and Labour candidate Trevor Young who held a meeting on that same day. Holyoake rejected the criticism and stated that the NZBC were under time constraints, which led them to omit filming the Labour meeting. Social Credit leader Vernon Cracknell was critical of the failure of the media to cover the Social Credit campaign, stating he believed they should be allotted the same attention that the two main parties were.

== Results ==
The following table gives the election results:

1968 Hutt by-election
Party	Candidate	Votes	%	±%
Labour	Trevor Young	5,968	47.79	
National	John Kennedy-Good	4,576	36.64	−2.24
Social Credit	Tom Weal	1,649	5.18	
Independent	Nick Ursin	295	2.36	
Majority		1,392	11.15	
Turnout		12,488	68.04	−18.74
Registered electors		18,354		
Labour hold		Swing		

== Aftermath ==
Young held the seat until its abolition in 1978. He then represented the seat of Eastern Hutt until 1990 when he retired.
