= 1856 Hutt by-election =

New Zealand by-election

The Hutt by-election 1856 was a by-election held in the multi-member Hutt electorate during the 2nd New Zealand Parliament, on 27 November 1856.

The by-election was caused by the resignation of incumbent MP Alfred Ludlam and was won by Samuel Revans. On nomination day (26 November) Samuel Revans and George Hart were nominated, and after a show of hands in favour of Revans, Hart demanded a poll. Samuel Revans was subsequently elected the following day.

== Results ==
1856 Hutt by-election
Party	Candidate	Votes	%	±%
Independent	Samuel Revans	96	80.0	
Independent	George Hart	24	20.0	
Turnout		120		
Majority		72		
