= Dillon Bell =

New Zealand politician (1822–1898)

The Honourable Sir Dillon Bell KCMG CB
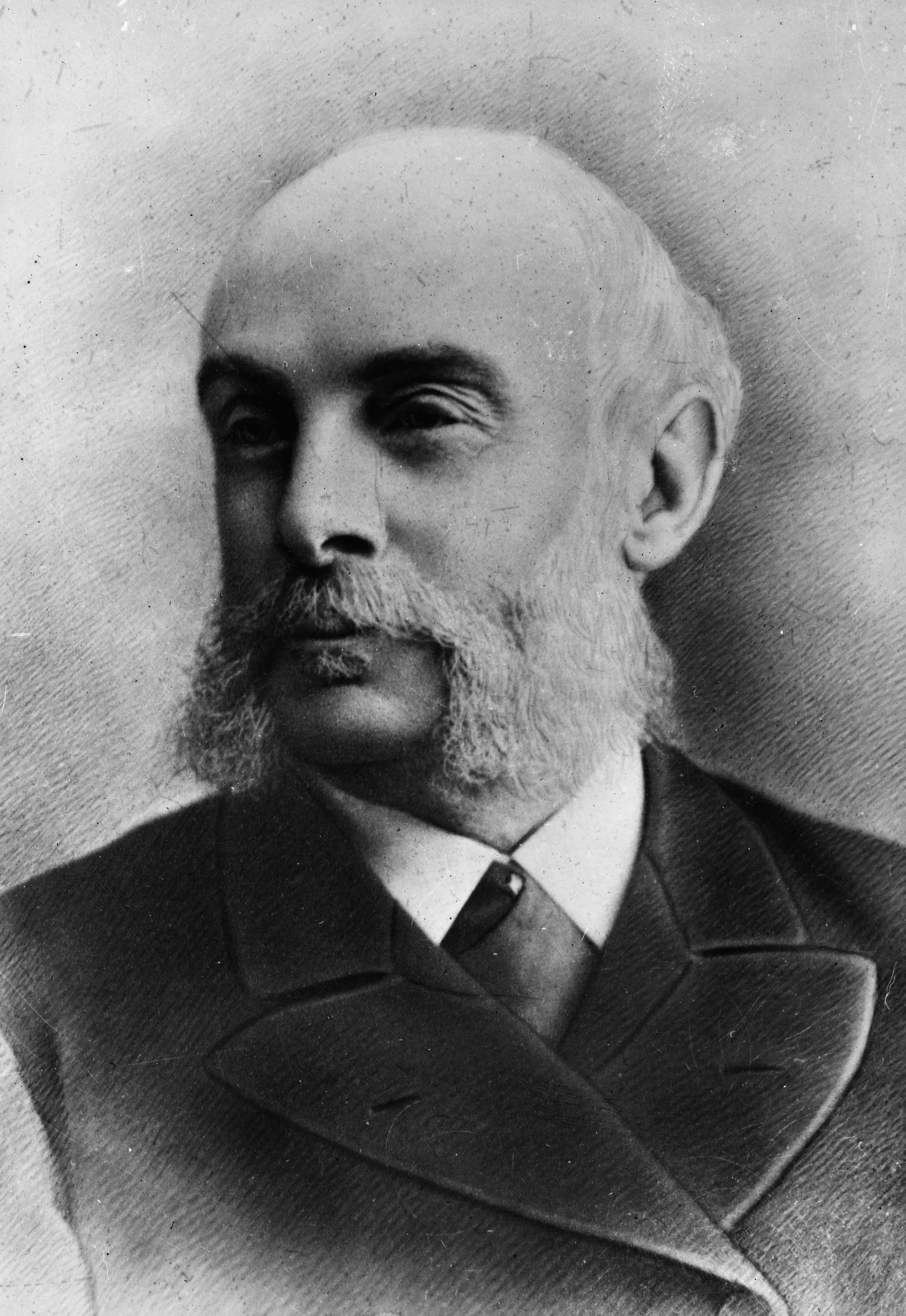
- Sir Dillon Bell c. 1881

3rd Colonial Treasurer
- In office 7 May 1856 – 20 May 1856
- Prime Minister: Henry Sewell
- In office 6 August 1862 – 21 August 1862
- Prime Minister: Alfred Domett

4th Minister of Native Affairs
- In office 6 August 1862 – 30 October 1863
- Prime Minister: Alfred Domett

3rd Speaker of the House of Representatives
- In office 1871–1875
- Prime Minister: Fox, Stafford, Waterhouse and Vogel

Personal details
- Born: Francis Dillon Bell; 8 October 1822 Bordeaux, France
- Died: 8 July 1898 (aged 75) Shag Valley (homestead), Otago; New Zealand
- Spouse(s): Margaret, Lady Bell (née Hort)
- Children: Francis Bell; Arthur Bell

Sir Francis Dillon Bell KCMG CB (8 October 1822 – 15 July 1898) was a New Zealand politician of the late 19th century. He served as New Zealand's third Minister of Finance (the first parliamentary finance minister), and later as its third Speaker of the House. The town of Bell Block near New Plymouth – on land Bell bought from the Puketapu iwi in 1849 – is named after him, as is Bell Street, Whanganui. Bell's son, Francis Henry Dillon Bell, became the first New Zealand born Prime Minister in 1925.

== Early life ==
Bell is believed to have been born in Bordeaux, France, where his father, Edward Bell, was a merchant and the British consul. His mother was Frances Matthews, daughter of Reverend J. Matthews. He grew up speaking both English and French fluently. When his family ran into financial problems, his father's cousin, Edward Gibbon Wakefield, managed to secure Bell a position as a clerk in the New Zealand Company's head office in London. As a result of office politics, however, it eventually became expedient for Bell to go to New Zealand in person, acting as an agent for the company.

== New Zealand Company ==
Bell arrived in New Zealand in 1843. He moved around New Zealand considerably, visiting Auckland, Nelson, and the Wairarapa before finally becoming the New Zealand Company's resident agent in New Plymouth. While there, he successfully negotiated land deals with local Māori.

Later, following the resignation of William Fox as the company's agent in Nelson, Bell was appointed to this position. Passing through Wellington on his way to take up the post, however, Bell found the company's director in New Zealand, William Wakefield, to be in ill health. Bell postponed his journey to Nelson in order to help manage the company's affairs, and Wakefield consequently recommended Bell as his successor before he died. In the end, however, Bell was outmanoeuvred by William Fox, who Bell was replacing as the company's agent in Nelson.

Bell was very bitter at Fox's victory, and it was possibly as a result of this bitterness that Bell became a strong supporter of Fox's enemy, Governor George Grey. Grey appointed Bell to the Legislative Council of the New Munster Province. Bell's reputation suffered considerably from his association with the Governor, however, and many thought of him as a time-server and a sycophant. Bell eventually returned to his company post in Nelson, although the New Zealand Company did not survive long after Wakefield's death.

== Political career ==
New Zealand Parliament
Years	Term	Electorate	Party
1855–1856	2nd	Hutt	Independent
1859–1860	2nd	Wallace	Independent
1861–1866	3rd	Wallace	Independent
1866–1870	4th	Mataura	Independent
1871–1875	5th	Mataura	Independent

In 1851, Grey appointed Bell to the Legislative Council. When the Legislative Council was reformed, becoming merely the upper house of the new General Assembly (now called Parliament), Bell's appointment was reconfirmed. In 1854, the Legislative Council demanded that one of its members should be appointed to Fitzgerald's Executive Council (roughly corresponding to Cabinet). Bell was selected to join the four members of the lower house who had already been appointed, and took his place on 30 June. On 11 July, however, he was forced to resign due to the ill health of his wife.

He joined the Wellington Provincial Council for the Wairarapa and Hawkes Bay electorate and served from November 1853 to February 1856. He was a member of the Wellington Executive Council from 16 March 1854; the source does not state his end date.

In the 1855 election, Bell stood for the lower house in the Hutt electorate, and was successful. When Henry Sewell became New Zealand's first Premier and formed the Sewell Ministry, Bell was appointed Colonial Treasurer on 7 May 1856 (the office from which the modern post of Minister of Finance is descended). Sewell's premiership lasted only two weeks, however, and Bell lost his position. He resigned from Parliament on 10 October 1856 and moved to Otago.

Bell contested a 17 May 1858 by-election against Charles Brown in the Grey and Bell electorate. Brown and Bell received 75 and 61 votes, respectively. Brown was thus declared elected.

In 1859, he contested a supplementary election for the new electorate of Wallace, and was elected on 30 November. He was re-elected in the 1860 election, and elected as MP for Mataura in the following two elections. As an MP, he was highly active in campaigning for Southland to become an independent province, a goal which came to fruition on 1 April 1861.

He also joined the Otago Provincial Council and represented the electorates of Matau (1865–1867), Dunedin (1869–1870), and Otaramika (1871–1873).

When Alfred Domett became Premier in 1862, Bell became Colonial Treasurer once again, and also Minister of Native Affairs. Bell was relatively experienced in negotiating with Māori, and spoke the Māori language fluently. Bell was not particularly active in his Native Affairs role, however, as he believed that the Governor – not Parliament – should have primary responsibility for Māori relations. When Domett was ousted as Premier by William Fox, Bell lost both roles. From 1869 to 1871, Bell was a minister without portfolio.

After the 1871 election, Bell was appointed Speaker of the House. He is generally regarded to have been a competent speaker, having few strong views that might have biased him. He was knighted in 1873.

== Later life ==
Although Bell initially intended to contest the 1875 election, he later decided to withdraw, expecting an appointment to the Legislative Council. A new government policy meant that this did not eventuate until 1877, however.

In late 1879 Bell, a pastoralist who by then had amassed a holding of 226,000 acres (910 km^{2}), joined Fox as the other member of the West Coast Commission to inquire into Māori grievances with confiscated lands in Taranaki. The commission's hearings, which had been prompted by friction between the Government and Te Whiti over plans to survey and sell previously confiscated land in central and south Taranaki, were closely connected with events at Parihaka, a settlement that became the centre of a passive resistance campaign against European encroachment on Māori land.

In 1880, Bell was offered a position as Agent-General in London. He served there until 1891. In London, Bell was involved in a large number of activities to promote New Zealand's interests, including discussions with the French regarding their territories in the Pacific – his fluency in French was a considerable asset in this regard.

As Agent-General in London he was New Zealand's senior representative at the World's Fair and exhibition at Paris in 1889 which showcased our agricultural and natural resources. For his role at the exhibition, Sir Francis Dillon Bell was decorated with the Commandeur of the Légion d'honneur by the French Government in November 1889. He had previously been was awarded the KCMG in 1881 and a CB in 1886.

Apart from one brief visit in 1891, Bell did not return to New Zealand until 1896, when he retired to a farm in Otago. He died on his Shag Valley homestead in 1898.

== Family ==
He married Margaret Hort in 1849. Her father, Abraham Hort, was a leading member of the Wellington Jewish community, but she became an ardent Christian. Their son, Francis Henry Dillon Bell became the first New Zealand born Prime Minister of New Zealand. Their second son Alfred managed their pastoral holdings; by 1874, he had over 226,000 acres (910 km^{2}) and nearly 80,000 sheep. Their fifth son, Arthur Bell, was active as an engineer in New Zealand and Western Australia.

== List of honours ==
- KCMG
- Companion of the Order of the Bath
- Commandeur de la Légion d'honneur (France)

== Notes ==
- Biography in the 1966 Encyclopaedia of New Zealand

Political offices
Preceded by Alexander Shepherd	Colonial Treasurer; 1856; 1862	Succeeded by Charles Brown
Preceded by Reader Wood	Colonial Treasurer; 1856; 1862	Succeeded by Reader Wood
Preceded by David Monro	Speaker of the New Zealand House of Representatives; 1871–1875	Succeeded by William Fitzherbert
New Zealand Parliament
Preceded by Edward Gibbon Wakefield	Member of Parliament for Hutt; 1855–1858; Served alongside: Alfred Ludlam, Samuel Revans	Succeeded by William Fitzherbert; Alfred Renall
New constituency	Member of Parliament for Wallace; 1859–1866; Served alongside: Walter Mantell	Succeeded by Alexander McNeill
New constituency	Member of Parliament for Mataura; 1866–1875	Succeeded by William Wood
Diplomatic posts
Preceded by Julius Vogel	Agent-General of New Zealand in the United Kingdom; 1880–1891	Succeeded by Westby Perceval
