= Alexander Shepherd (public servant) =

2nd Colonial Treasurer
- In office 9 May 1842 – 14 June 1854
- Preceded by: George Cooper
- Succeeded by: Dillon Bell

Personal details
- Born: c. 1797/98 Aberdeen, Scotland
- Died: 20 July 1859 Auckland, New Zealand

Alexander Shepherd (c. 1797/98 – 20 July 1859) was the second Colonial Treasurer of New Zealand.

== Biography ==
Shepherd was born in Aberdeen. He arrived in Wellington on the New York Packet from London in 1842, where he was delayed by a month before the next vessel went to Auckland, then the seat of the Government.

Shepherd was appointed Colonial Treasurer on 9 May 1842, succeeding George Cooper. He thus became a member of the Executive Council of the Crown Colony, with the role of Colonial Treasurer being the fourth most senior role at the time (after Governor, Colonial Secretary and Attorney-General). When New Zealand gained self-government with the formation of the Fitzgerald Ministry on 14 June 1854, Shepherd's role was disestablished and he was given a government pension.

Shepherd's stepdaughter, Jane Augusta Griffith, married Frederick Whitaker at St. Paul's Church in Auckland on 4 March 1843. His second daughter, Cecilia Mary, married Maurice O'Rorke on 31 December 1858.

Shepherd died on 20 July 1859 aged 61 years in Auckland after a short illness.

== Notes ==
Political offices
Preceded by George Cooper	Colonial Treasurer; 1842–1854	Succeeded by Dillon Bell
