= Minister of Finance (New Zealand) =

New Zealand minister of the Crown

- Coat of Arms of New Zealand

- Flag of New Zealand

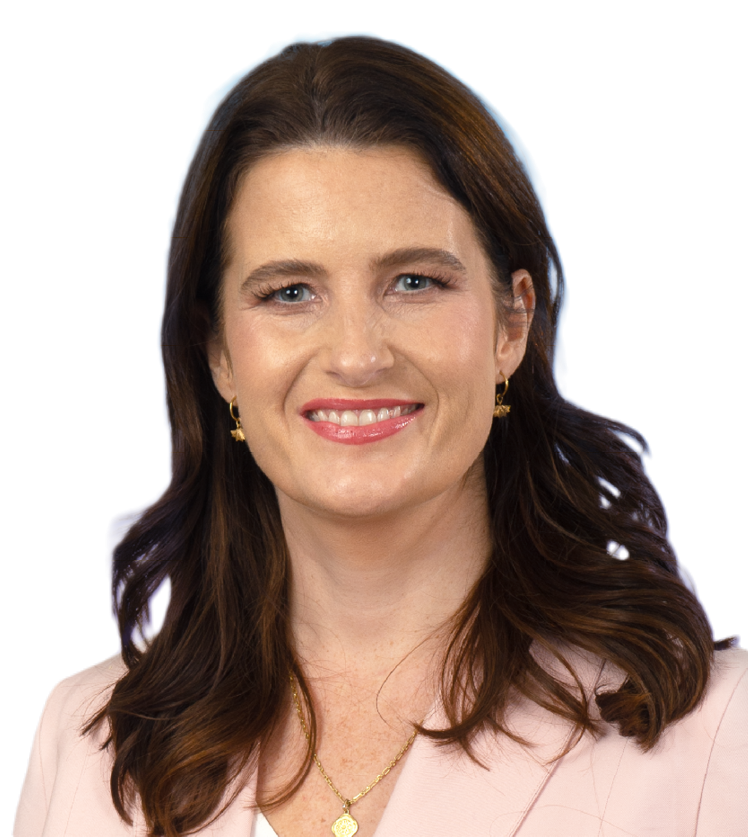
- Incumbent; Nicola Willis since 27 November 2023
- The Treasury
- Style: The Honourable
- Member of: Cabinet of New Zealand; Executive Council
- Reports to: Prime Minister
- Seat: Wellington
- Nominator: Prime Minister
- Appointer: Governor-General of New Zealand on the advice of the prime minister
- Term length: At His Majesty's pleasure
- Formation: 3 May 1841
- First holder: George Cooper as Colonial Treasurer
- Salary: $288,900
- Website: www.beehive.govt.nz

The minister of Finance (Māori: Minita mo nga Moni) is the minister and the head of the New Zealand Treasury, responsible for producing an annual New Zealand Budget outlining the government's proposed expenditure. The position is often considered to be the most important cabinet post after that of the prime minister.

The current Minister of Finance is Nicola Willis. There are currently three associate minister roles held by Chris Bishop, David Seymour, and Shane Jones.

== Responsibilities and powers ==
One of the Minister of Finance's key roles involves the framing of the annual year budget. According to Parliament's Standing Orders, the Minister of Finance may veto any parliamentary bill which would have a significant impact on the government's budget plans. The Minister of Finance supervises the Treasury, which is the government's primary advisor on matters of economic and financial policy. As such, the Minister of Finance has broad control of the government's spending, making the position quite powerful.

Some analysts, such as Jonathan Boston, claim that the Minister of Finance can sometimes hold more influence than the Prime Minister, if the conditions are right. Gordon Coates, Finance Minister in the early 1930s, was sometimes such a figure. Some political scientists, such as Boston, believe that in the government of David Lange, Minister of Finance Roger Douglas held more power than was proper, and that the Treasury was using its control of government finances to take a supervisory role across the whole administration. It was probably for this reason that Lange's successor, Geoffrey Palmer, established the Department of the Prime Minister and Cabinet, which could offer the Prime Minister advice independent of that given by individual ministers.

== History ==
The office has existed since 1841. Apart from the office of Prime Minister itself, the only other cabinet posts to have existed since the first cabinet are those of Attorney-General and Minister of Internal Affairs. Originally, the holder of the post was designated Colonial Treasurer, but this term was replaced with Minister of Finance shortly after New Zealand ceased to be a Colony and became a Dominion in 1907, during the cabinet of Joseph Ward.

In the past, several Prime Ministers took on the post of Minister of Finance themselves, though in recent times this practice has declined. Robert Muldoon, the last Prime Minister to also serve as his own Minister of Finance, created considerable controversy by doing so. It is more common, however, for a Deputy Prime Minister to serve as Minister of Finance. Bob Tizard, Michael Cullen, Bill English and Grant Robertson served as Deputy Prime Minister when in the position as Minister of Finance.

Traditionally Ministers of Finance rank second or third in seniority lists within Westminster-style Cabinets, although initially Harry Lake was ranked at sixth and his successor Robert Muldoon was ranked at eighth; both because of their short service to date in Parliament, and because Keith Holyoake saw Muldoon as too arrogant and ambitious for his own good. In the Hipkins Cabinet, Grant Robertson was ranked fourth, although he was the most senior minister who was not the prime minister, deputy prime minister, or deputy leader of the Labour Party.

== Junior ministerial appointments in the finance portfolio ==
The convention of making a second, more junior appointment in the Finance portfolio began with Holyoake, who appointed Muldoon as an Assistant Minister to Lake shortly before the latter's death in 1967. Some successive Prime Ministers made similar appointments of an Associate Minister of Finance (for example, Marshall and Kirk) but this was not always done (Rowling, for example, who had Mick Connelly as his associate while serving as Finance Minister did not appoint an associate Minister after succeeding to the premiership in 1974). Associate appointments became standard when Muldoon served concurrently as both Prime Minister and Finance Minister. In his second term, Muldoon appointed both a Deputy Minister of Finance (Hugh Templeton) as well as an associate Minister (Derek Quigley). Muldoon's successors Lange and Palmer continued to have a three-strong Finance team, each appointing two associate Ministers to support their respective Ministers of Finance. At times, the appointment of associate ministers was intended to temper the reform ambitions of Roger Douglas.

In the coalition governments formed in 1996, 2017 and 2023, responsibility for Finance was shared between the parties. After the 1996 elections, the role of the Minister of Finance was formally split between two portfolios – that of Minister of Finance and that of Treasurer. The position of Treasurer was senior to that of the Minister of Finance, and was created as part of the coalition agreement between the National Party and New Zealand First. It was established especially for Winston Peters, leader of New Zealand First, who demanded it as part of the deal. When Peters ended the coalition, the position reverted to the National Party. After the change of government in 1999, both positions were held concurrently by Michael Cullen before they were combined into the old Minister of Finance portfolio in 2002. Associate Finance roles were won in coalition negotiations by New Zealand First, the Green Party and ACT New Zealand in the formation of both the Sixth Labour Government and the Sixth National Government.

== List of finance ministers ==
Key

Independent Liberal Reform United Labour National

No.	Name	Portrait	Term of office		Prime Minister
1	George Cooper	George Cooper NZ	5 January 1840	9 May 1842	none
2	Alexander Shepherd		9 May 1842	7 May 1856	none
3	Dillon Bell		7 May 1856	20 May 1856	Sewell
4	Charles Brown		20 May 1856	2 June 1856	Fox
5	Henry Sewell		2 June 1856	4 November 1856	Stafford
6	William Richmond		4 November 1856	25 February 1859	Stafford
(5)	Henry Sewell		25 February 1859	26 April 1859	Stafford
(6)	William Richmond		26 April 1859	12 July 1861	Stafford
7	Reader Wood		12 July 1861	6 August 1862	Fox
(3)	Dillon Bell		6 August 1862	21 August 1862	Domett
(7)	Reader Wood		21 August 1862	24 November 1864	Domett
(7)	Reader Wood		21 August 1862	24 November 1864	Whitaker
8	William Fitzherbert		24 November 1864	16 October 1865	Weld
9	Edward Stafford		31 October 1865	12 June 1866	Stafford
10	Francis Jollie		12 June 1866	24 August 1866	Stafford
(8)	William Fitzherbert		24 August 1866	28 June 1869	Stafford
11	Julius Vogel		28 June 1869	10 September 1872	Fox
12	Thomas Gillies		10 September 1872	11 October 1872	Stafford
(11)	Julius Vogel		11 October 1872	6 July 1875	Waterhouse
(11)	Julius Vogel		11 October 1872	6 July 1875	Fox
(11)	Julius Vogel		11 October 1872	6 July 1875	Vogel
13	Harry Atkinson		6 July 1875	15 February 1876	Pollen
(11)	Julius Vogel		15 February 1876	1 September 1876	Vogel
(13)	Harry Atkinson		1 September 1876	13 October 1877	Atkinson
14	William Larnach		15 October 1877	5 March 1878	Grey
15	John Ballance		12 March 1878	1 July 1879	Grey
16	George Grey		10 July 1879	8 October 1879	Grey
(13)	Harry Atkinson		8 October 1879	16 August 1884	Hall
(13)	Harry Atkinson		8 October 1879	16 August 1884	Whitaker
(13)	Harry Atkinson		8 October 1879	16 August 1884	Atkinson
(11)	Julius Vogel		16 August 1884 3 September 1884	28 August 1884 8 October 1887	Stout
(13)	Harry Atkinson		8 October 1887	24 January 1891	Atkinson
(15)	John Ballance		24 January 1891	27 April 1893	Ballance
17	Joseph Ward		1 May 1893	16 June 1896	Seddon
18	Richard Seddon		16 June 1896	10 June 1906	Seddon
19	William Hall-Jones		21 June 1906	6 August 1906	Hall-Jones
(17)	Joseph Ward		6 August 1906	28 March 1912	Ward
20	Arthur Myers		28 March 1912	10 July 1912	Mackenzie
21	James Allen		10 July 1912	12 August 1915	Massey
(17)	Joseph Ward		12 August 1915	21 August 1919	Massey
(21)	James Allen		4 September 1919	28 April 1920	Massey
22	William Massey		12 May 1920	10 May 1925	Massey
23	William Nosworthy		14 May 1925	24 May 1926	Bell
23	William Nosworthy		14 May 1925	24 May 1926	Coates
24	William Downie Stewart Jr		24 May 1926	10 December 1928	Coates
(17)	Joseph Ward		10 December 1928	28 May 1930	Ward
25	George Forbes		28 May 1930	22 September 1931	Forbes
(24)	William Downie Stewart Jr		22 September 1931	28 January 1933	Forbes
26	Gordon Coates		28 January 1933	6 December 1935	Forbes
27	Walter Nash		6 December 1935	13 December 1949	Savage
27	Walter Nash		6 December 1935	13 December 1949	Fraser
28	Sidney Holland		13 December 1949	26 November 1954	Holland
29	Jack Watts		26 November 1954	12 December 1957	Holland
29	Jack Watts		26 November 1954	12 December 1957	Holyoake
30	Arnold Nordmeyer		12 December 1957	12 December 1960	Nash
31	Harry Lake		12 December 1960	21 February 1967	Holyoake
32	Robert Muldoon		4 March 1967	8 December 1972	Holyoake
32	Robert Muldoon		4 March 1967	8 December 1972	Marshall
33	Bill Rowling		8 December 1972	6 September 1974	Kirk
34	Bob Tizard		6 September 1974	12 December 1975	Rowling
(32)	Robert Muldoon		12 December 1975	26 July 1984	Muldoon
35	Roger Douglas		26 July 1984	14 December 1988	Lange
36	David Caygill		14 December 1988	2 November 1990	Lange
36	David Caygill		14 December 1988	2 November 1990	Palmer
36	David Caygill		14 December 1988	2 November 1990	Moore
37	Ruth Richardson		2 November 1990	29 November 1993	Bolger
38	Bill Birch		29 November 1993	1 February 1999	Bolger
38	Bill Birch		29 November 1993	1 February 1999	Shipley
39	Bill English		1 February 1999	22 June 1999	Shipley
(38)	Bill Birch		22 June 1999	10 December 1999	Shipley
40	Michael Cullen		10 December 1999	19 November 2008	Clark
(39)	Bill English		19 November 2008	12 December 2016	Key
41	Steven Joyce		12 December 2016	26 October 2017	English
42	Grant Robertson		26 October 2017	27 November 2023	Ardern
42	Grant Robertson		26 October 2017	27 November 2023	Hipkins
43	Nicola Willis		27 November 2023	Incumbent	Luxon

== List of treasurers ==
Key

NZ First National Labour

No.	Name	Portrait	Term of office		Prime Minister
1	Winston Peters		16 December 1996	14 August 1998	Bolger
1	Winston Peters		16 December 1996	14 August 1998	Shipley
2	Bill Birch		14 August 1998	22 June 1999	Shipley
3	Bill English		22 June 1999	10 December 1999	Shipley
4	Michael Cullen		10 December 1999	15 August 2002	Clark

== List of junior ministerial appointments in the finance portfolio ==
Key

National Labour NZ First Te Tawharau Green ACT

#	Name	Title	Start	End	Minister of Finance	Prime Minister
1	Robert Muldoon	Minister Assistant to the Minister of Finance	15 February 1967	4 March 1967	Lake	Holyoake
2	Lorrie Pickering	Associate Minister of Finance	22 December 1969	9 February 1972	Muldoon	Holyoake
3	George Gair	Associate Minister of Finance	9 February 1972	8 December 1972	Muldoon	Marshall
4	Mick Connelly	Associate Minister of Finance	8 December 1972	10 September 1974	Rowling	Kirk
(3)	George Gair	Deputy Minister of Finance	12 December 1975	8 March 1977	Muldoon	Muldoon
4	Peter Wilkinson	Associate Minister of Finance	12 December 1975	8 March 1977	Muldoon	Muldoon
5	Hugh Templeton	Associate Minister of Finance	8 March 1977	13 December 1978	Muldoon	Muldoon
5	Hugh Templeton	Deputy Minister of Finance	13 December 1978	11 December 1981	Muldoon	Muldoon
6	Derek Quigley	Associate Minister of Finance	13 December 1978	12 February 1981	Muldoon	Muldoon
7	Warren Cooper	Associate Minister of Finance	12 February 1981	11 December 1981	Muldoon	Muldoon
8	John Falloon	Associate Minister of Finance	11 December 1981	26 July 1984	Muldoon	Muldoon
9	Richard Prebble	Associate Minister of Finance	26 July 1984	24 August 1987	Douglas	Lange
10	David Caygill	Associate Minister of Finance	26 July 1984	24 August 1987	Douglas	Lange
11	Michael Cullen	Associate Minister of Finance	24 August 1987	12 September 1988	Douglas	Lange
12	David Butcher	Associate Minister of Finance	24 August 1987	12 September 1988	Douglas	Lange
13	Peter Neilson	Associate Minister of Finance	24 August 1987	2 November 1990	Douglas, Caygill	Lange, Palmer, Moore
(10)	David Caygill	Deputy Minister of Finance	12 September 1988	14 December 1988	Douglas	Lange
14	Mike Moore	Deputy Minister of Finance	12 September 1988	9 February 1990	Douglas, Caygill	Lange, Palmer
15	Stan Rodger	Deputy Minister of Finance	14 August 1989	9 February 1990	Caygill	Palmer
16	Doug Kidd	Associate Minister of Finance	2 November 1990	3 October 1991	Richardson	Bolger
17	Maurice McTigue	Associate Minister of Finance	2 November 1990	27 March 1993	Richardson	Bolger
18	Wyatt Creech	Associate Minister of Finance	3 October 1991	29 November 1993	Richardson	Bolger
19	Simon Upton	Associate Minister of Finance	27 March 1993	29 November 1993	Richardson	Bolger
(18)	Wyatt Creech	Deputy Minister of Finance	29 November 1993	1 March 1996	Birch	Bolger
20	Bruce Cliffe	Associate Minister of Finance	29 November 1993	29 June 1995	Birch	Bolger
21	Lockwood Smith	Deputy Minister of Finance	1 March 1996	16 December 1996	Birch	Bolger
22	Tuariki Delamere	Associate Treasurer	16 December 1996	31 August 1998	Peters (Treasurer)	Bolger
22	Tuariki Delamere	Associate Treasurer	16 December 1996	31 August 1998	Peters (Treasurer)	Shipley
22	Tuariki Delamere	Associate Treasurer	16 December 1996	31 August 1998	Birch (Treasurer)	Shipley
23	Bill English	Associate Treasurer	31 August 1998	1 February 1999	Birch (Treasurer)	Shipley
(21)	Lockwood Smith	Associate Minister of Finance	31 August 1998	10 December 1999	Birch, English, Birch	Shipley
(22)	Tuariki Delamere	Associate Minister of Finance	31 August 1998	10 December 1999	Birch, English, Birch	Shipley
24	Trevor Mallard	Associate Minister of Finance	10 December 1999	19 November 2008	Cullen	Clark
25	Paul Swain	Associate Minister of Finance	13 November 2000	19 May 2003	Cullen	Clark
26	David Cunliffe	Associate Minister of Finance	19 May 2003	19 October 2005	Cullen	Clark
27	Phil Goff	Associate Minister of Finance	19 October 2005	19 November 2008	Cullen	Clark
28	Clayton Cosgrove	Associate Minister of Finance	19 October 2005	19 November 2008	Cullen	Clark
29	Simon Power	Associate Minister of Finance	19 November 2008	14 December 2011	English	Key
30	Steven Joyce	Associate Minister of Finance	19 November 2008	20 December 2016	English	Key
31	Jonathan Coleman	Associate Minister of Finance	14 December 2011	8 October 2014	English	Key
32	Paula Bennett	Associate Minister of Finance	8 October 2014	20 December 2016	English	Key
33	Simon Bridges	Associate Minister of Finance	20 December 2016	26 October 2017	Joyce	English
34	Amy Adams	Associate Minister of Finance	20 December 2016	26 October 2017	Joyce	English
35	David Clark	Associate Minister of Finance	26 October 2017	7 April 2020	Robertson	Ardern
36	Shane Jones	Associate Minister of Finance	26 October 2017	6 November 2020	Robertson	Ardern
37	James Shaw	Associate Minister of Finance	26 October 2017	6 November 2020	Robertson	Ardern
38	David Parker	Associate Minister of Finance	26 October 2017	27 November 2023	Robertson	Ardern, Hipkins
39	Megan Woods	Associate Minister of Finance	6 November 2020	27 November 2023	Robertson	Ardern, Hipkins
40	Kiri Allan	Associate Minister of Finance	14 June 2022	1 February 2023	Robertson	Ardern, Hipkins
41	Michael Wood	Associate Minister of Finance	1 February 2023	21 June 2023	Robertson	Hipkins
(40)	Kiri Allan	Associate Minister of Finance	21 June 2023	24 July 2023	Robertson	Hipkins
42	Barbara Edmonds	Associate Minister of Finance	24 July 2023	27 November 2023	Robertson	Hipkins
43	Chris Bishop	Associate Minister of Finance	27 November 2023	Incumbent	Willis	Luxon
44	David Seymour	Associate Minister of Finance	27 November 2023	Incumbent	Willis	Luxon
(36)	Shane Jones	Associate Minister of Finance	27 November 2023	Incumbent	Willis	Luxon
