= Alfred Ludlam =

New Zealand politician (1810–1877)

Alfred Ludlam MP

Member of the New Zealand Parliament for Hutt
- In office 1853–1855
- In office 1855–1856
- In office 1866–1870

Personal details
- Born: 1810 Newry; Ireland, United Kingdom
- Died: 8 November 1877 (aged 66–67) Wellington; New Zealand
- Party: Independent
- Spouse: Fanny Ludlam (née Gibbes)
- Profession: politician, horticulturist and farmer

Alfred Ludlam (1810 – 8 November 1877) was a leading New Zealand politician, horticulturist and farmer who owned land at Wellington and in the Hutt Valley. A member of three of New Zealand's four earliest parliaments, he was also a philanthropist and a founder of Wellington's Botanic Garden.

== Birth in Ireland ==
Born in or near the town of Newry, County Down, Ireland, Ludlam lived for a while in the West Indies before coming to New Zealand, where he would spend the rest of his life apart from visits to Australia and England. (Little is known about Ludlam's early activities in Ireland or the West Indies but a preserved specimen of the common iguana, collected by him on Tobago, is listed in an 1845 British Museum catalogue of lizards.)

== Career in New Zealand ==
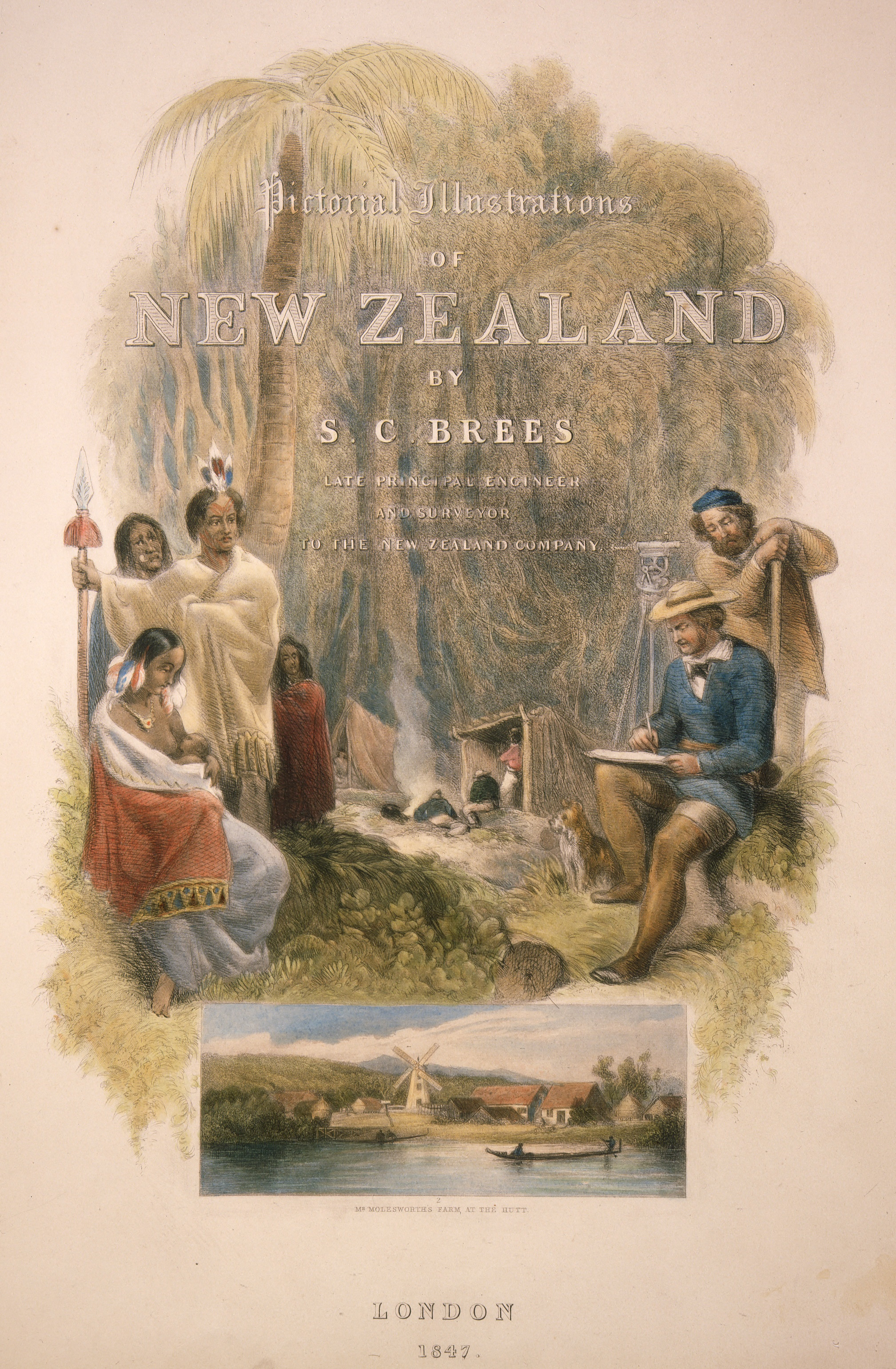
Lower inset shows Ludlam's windmill on the Hutt River in 1845

Alfred Ludlam, aged 30, arrived at Wellington on New Zealand's North Island on 12 December 1840 from Gravesend in England. He is listed as a "cabin passenger" aboard the 700-ton emigrant vessel London, which sailed under the auspices of the New Zealand Company. (The company had formed in London the previous year with the purpose of promoting the orderly colonisation of New Zealand by British settlers.) He prospered in his new homeland, proving an energetic, intelligent and highly capable settler who proceeded to play an active role in the Wellington region's civic and cultural life. He assisted the Lower Hutt militia during the New Zealand Wars, which pitted the British colonists against the indigenous Māori tribes. He served in the militia as Captain Ludlam from July 1860 onwards.

New Zealand Parliament
Years	Term	Electorate	Party
1853–1855	1st	Hutt	Independent
1855–1856	2nd	Hutt	Independent
1866–1870	4th	Hutt	Independent

In 1853 voters elected Ludlam and Edward Gibbon Wakefield (formerly one of the directors of the New Zealand Company) to represent the electorate of Hutt in New Zealand's first Parliament, which opened in Auckland on 24 May the following year. Ludlam would also be elected as a member of the second Parliament and the fourth Parliament, representing Hutt in 1853–55 (resigned 9 July), 1855–56 (resigned 16 August) and 1866–70 (retired). He resigned his seat before the conclusion of both the 1st and 2nd Parliaments.

In addition, Ludlam was elected to represent the Hutt Valley on the Wellington Provincial Council in 1853–56 and again in 1866–70. His propensity for straight-talking inhibited his ability as a deft political operator but it did earn him the respect of his parliamentary colleagues and his constituents. He was nicknamed "Old Bricks" because of his solid, reliable character and stern appearance. Taller than average in height, he sported mutton-chop whiskers and a monocle during his time in public life.

During the 1850s and 1860s, Ludlam's political and social activities brought him into occasional contact with the uncle of his wife—the English-born baronet and former Barbados sugar planter Sir Samuel Osborne-Gibbes. Sir Samuel (1803–1874) was a prominent Freemason and a landed proprietor at Whangārei, in the far north of New Zealand's North Island. He was a Legislative Councillor from 1855 to 1863, impressing Ludlam with the strength of his belief in noblesse oblige community service and his advocacy of high ethical standards.

Ludlam became a notable landed proprietor. His holdings included real estate in Ghuznee Street, Wellington (town sections 169 and 171), and he owned a substantial riverside farm at Waiwhetū in Lower Hutt, where he ran flocks of sheep and developed a reputation as an expert in horticulture. He had purchased the Waiwhetū farm from fellow-pioneer Francis Molesworth in the mid-1840s, calling it Newry after his home town in Ireland. Ludlam built a large house at Newry in 1848, replacing the farm's first homestead. The farm also boasted an orchard, a spacious barn often used for public functions (such as an official dinner held for the governor, Sir George Grey, in 1851) and a stone windmill that Molesworth had erected in 1845.

In 1860 Ludlam imported the first Romney Marsh sheep from England into New Zealand, instituting a successful ovine breeding programme at a purpose-built stud at Newry. (His brother-in-law, Augustus Onslow Manby Gibbes, conducted a similar Romney Marsh breeding programme at his Australian sheep property, Yarralumla (the present-day site of Australia's Government House in Canberra), during this same period). Ludlam also opened a beautiful landscaped garden at Newry in 1868. He called it The Gums as a tribute to Australia's native eucalyptus trees, which he had studied. (After Ludlam's death the area was renamed McNabb's Gardens and later converted into the Bellevue Pleasure Gardens.)

Ludlam supported the Wellington Colonial Museum and was one of the driving forces behind the establishment of the Wellington Botanic Garden in 1869, having introduced into the New Zealand Parliament legislation to "establish and regulate" the garden. He also introduced an act of parliament which entrusted management of the Botanic Garden to the New Zealand Institute (forerunner of the Royal Society of New Zealand). His contribution to the garden's establishment is commemorated on the 77-acre (31 ha) site by the pedestrian thoroughfare known as Ludlam Way.

A year after the Botanic Garden was established by means of a Crown Grant (dated 22 November 1869), Ludlam acted as a pallbearer at the funeral in Wellington of the Māori chief Honiana Te Puni, after whom the Lower Hutt suburb of Epuni takes its name.

== Marriage in Australia ==
Ludlam was a periodic visitor to the Australian colony of New South Wales. The main reason for these trans-Tasman visits of Ludlam's was to do business in the City of Sydney, which served as New South Wales' principal trading port, population centre and seat of government. One of the businessmen with whom he dealt was Thomas Sutcliffe Mort—an industrialist, pastoralist and pioneer of the frozen-meat trade.

Ludlam also found time to socialise while in Sydney and, on 1 October 1850, he married into Sydney's colonial establishment. The marriage was solemnised at St Thomas' Anglican Church, North Sydney by Ludlam's friend, the clergyman-scientist William Branwhite Clarke, and his bride was Frances "Fanny" Minto Gibbes. Fanny (1822/23-1877) was the third daughter of Colonel John George Nathaniel Gibbes and the Colonel's wife, Elizabeth (née Davis). London-born Colonel Gibbes (1787–1873) was a senior government official and a veteran of the Napoleonic Wars. He had been head of the New South Wales Customs Service since 1834 and occupied a Crown-nominee's seat in the New South Wales Legislative Council.

Then aged in her late 20s, Fanny was living with her parents at Wotonga House—nowadays part of Admiralty House complex on Sydney's Kirribilli Point—at the time of her marriage to Ludlam. She and her husband spent their honeymoon relaxing at a rural New South Wales property, Yarralumla, which belonged to Fanny's brother-in-law, (Sir) Terence Aubrey Murray. Following their honeymoon, the Ludlams left Australia for New Zealand, making the farm at Newry their marital nest. This move, however, almost proved to be a fatal mistake: on 23 January 1855, the Wairarapa earthquake destroyed Newry homestead, and the Ludlams narrowly escaped being crushed to death when a brick chimney in the living room collapsed around them. After the earthquake, as the Ludlams waited for Newry to be made habitable again, they went to live with the New Zealand politician and landowner (Sir) David Monro, who owned a farm at Nelson. Still extant is a vivid description of the earthquake and its destructive impact on the Wellington region, written by Alfred Ludlam to Sir David in a lengthy private letter dated 8 March 1855.

Ludlam was devoted to his wife. Cultured and well read but the possessor of an irreverent sense of humour, Fanny could speak several languages and was an amateur artist and musician of above-average competence. She also liked to garden on a serious scale, providing her husband with vital help in the completion of his various horticultural projects at Newry. Although she was a dozen or so years Ludlam's junior she nonetheless predeceased him, succumbing to a painful "stoppage of the bowel" on 5 March 1877. She and Ludlam happened to be staying in London, at 2 Clifton Terrace, Maida Vale, when she died, and her death notice was duly published in the New Zealand press and The Sydney Morning Herald of 4 May 1877.

== Final illness, death and burial ==
Following the loss of Fanny, a despondent Ludlam returned to New Zealand. He had developed a chronic kidney ailment, and sensing that his days were now numbered, devoted himself to helping needy people and supporting good causes. Ludlam died at a house in Hobart Street, Wellington, on 8 November 1877 and was buried four days later in Bolton Street Cemetery. His death certificate (registration number 1877/2787) ascribed the cause of his demise to "Bright's disease" (an old-fashioned term for nephritis) and "acute peritonitis".

Ludlam was aged 67 when he died. The final phase of his life had been devoted to charitable works, and his death was sincerely mourned by a wide circle of friends, acquaintances and beneficiaries. He was not survived by any children and his grave was destroyed during the 1960s by the construction of the Wellington Urban Motorway. His gravestone was relocated and can be found near the Bolton Street Chapel. An official photograph of him is preserved, however, in the archives of the library of the New Zealand Parliament in Wellington. Ludlam Street in the Wellington suburb of Seatoun, Ludlam Street in the Wairarapa town of Featherston and Ludlam Crescent at Lower Hutt perpetuate his name.

New Zealand Parliament
New constituency	Member of Parliament for Hutt; 1853–1856; Served alongside: Edward Gibbon Wakefield, Dillon Bell; 1866–1870; Served alongside: William Fitzherbert	Succeeded by Samuel Revans
Preceded by Alfred Renall	Member of Parliament for Hutt; 1853–1856; Served alongside: Edward Gibbon Wakefield, Dillon Bell; 1866–1870; Served alongside: William Fitzherbert	Succeeded by William Fitzherbert
