= Samuel Revans =

New Zealand entrepreneur and politician (1807–1888)

Samuel Revans (ca. 1807 – 14 July 1888) was a New Zealand newspaper owner, entrepreneur and politician. He was the Father of Journalism in New Zealand.

== Early life ==
Samuel Revans is known to have been a native of London but, as was common in the early 19th century, the day, month and even the exact year of his birth have been lost to history. He was trained as a printer, and worked in London.

== Professional life ==
=== Canada and England ===
He then joined Henry Samuel Chapman in Canada, where they founded one of the first Canadian daily newspapers, the Montreal Daily Advertiser. Chapman returned to England in 1834, but Revans remained until 1837, when journalist indiscretions in connection with Papineau's revolt required his hasty return to England. Chapman and Revans were to be reunited in New Zealand, where Chapman became a leading jurist. Back in England, Revans was involved in Chartist disturbances and was introduced by J. A. Roebuck to the New Zealand Company. He became secretary of the executive committee of the New Zealand Company and the editor of the New Zealand Gazette, which he initially printed in his London office on 21 August 1839.

=== New Zealand ===
Revans arrived in New Zealand on the ship Adelaide on 7 March 1840, docking at Wellington Harbour's Port Nicholson. On 18 April of the same year, he published the second edition of the New Zealand Gazette, the first newspaper published in the newly settled islands. He also invested in the timber business, and established a number of farms. Gradually, he became more distant from his newspaper, leaving both the printing and the editing to his staff. He also began to question the effectiveness of Wakefield's New Zealand Company. Eventually, his publishing business collapsed, leaving him reliant on his other properties for income.

In 1848, Revans became prominent in the newly formed Wellington Settlers' Constitutional Association, which advocated representative government. Revans' involvement was briefly interrupted by a sudden business venture – sailing to San Francisco with a cargo of timber and potatoes, which he hoped to sell to participants in the California gold rush. When this enterprise failed to meet with its expected success, Revans returned to New Zealand, where he and William Mein Smith had established a large station at Huangaroa, near modern Masterton, in Wairarapa.

== Political career ==
New Zealand Parliament
Years	Term	Electorate	Party
1853–1855	1st	Wairarapa and Hawke's Bay	Independent
1856–1858	2nd	Hutt	Independent

When self-government for New Zealand was finally instituted, Revans stood in the first provincial elections and the first general election. He was successful, and represented the Wairarapa and Hawke's Bay electorate in the 1st New Zealand Parliament and on the Wellington Provincial Council. In the 2nd New Zealand Parliament, he contested a 27 November 1856 by-election against Robert Hart in the Hutt electorate and gained 96 votes against 24 for Hart. Revans resigned on 22 March 1858. Politically, he generally supported Isaac Featherston, a prominent Wellingtonian politician, and opposed Edward Gibbon Wakefield and his son Jerningham Wakefield. Revans was known for his then-radical views on many subjects, including a strong support for republicanism.

== Death ==
Samuel Revans died in relative obscurity in Greytown, Wairarapa at the age of approximately 80.

New Zealand Parliament
Preceded by Alfred Ludlam	Member of Parliament for Hutt; 1856–1858; Served alongside: Dillon Bell	Succeeded by William Fitzherbert; Alfred Renall
