= William Fitzherbert (politician, born 1810) =

New Zealand politician (1810–1891)

The Honourable Sir William Fitzherbert KCMG
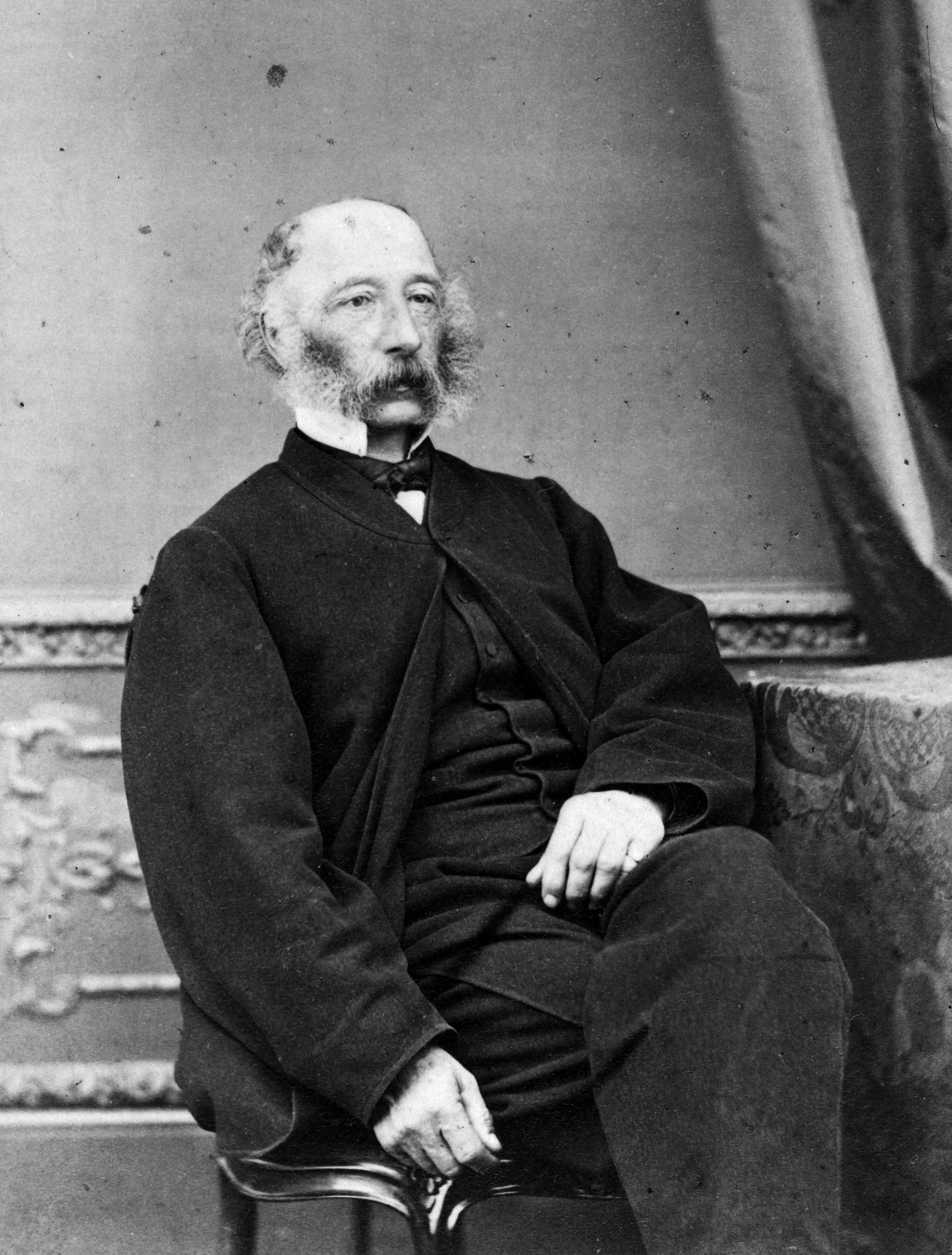

5th Speaker of the Legislative Council
- In office 1879–1887
- Preceded by: John Richardson
- Succeeded by: George Waterhouse
- In office 1887–1891
- Preceded by: George Waterhouse
- Succeeded by: Harry Atkinson

4th Speaker of the House of Representatives
- In office 1876–1879
- Preceded by: Dillon Bell
- Succeeded by: Maurice O'Rorke

8th Colonial Treasurer
- In office 24 November 1864 – 16 October 1865
- Prime Minister: Frederick Weld
- Preceded by: Reader Wood
- Succeeded by: Edward Stafford
- In office 24 August 1866 – 28 June 1869
- Prime Minister: Edward Stafford
- Preceded by: Francis Jollie
- Succeeded by: Julius Vogel

Member of the New Zealand Parliament for Hutt
- In office 1858–1879 Serving with Isaac Featherston; Charles Clifford
- Preceded by: Alfred Renall; Alfred Ludlam
- Succeeded by: Henry Jackson

2nd Superintendent of Wellington Province
- In office 28 April 1871 – 1 January 1877
- Preceded by: Isaac Featherston
- Succeeded by: None (office abolished)

Personal details
- Born: 15 August 1810 Dorset; England
- Died: 6 February 1891 (aged 80) Lower Hutt; New Zealand
- Party: Independent
- Spouse: Sarah Jane Leigh
- Relations: Patrick Buckley (son in law)
- Children: Henry; William
- Profession: politician, merchant

Sir William Fitzherbert KCMG (15 August 1810 – 6 February 1891) was a New Zealand politician. He served as Minister of Finance, Speaker of the House of Representatives, and Speaker of the Legislative Council.

== Early life ==
Fitzherbert was born in Dorset, England, on 15 August 1810. He was educated at Sherborne and studied medicine in Paris and London graduating with an MD in 1839. Late in 1840 or early 1841 he married Sarah Jane Leigh in London. They came to New Zealand in 1841, settling in Wellington. Fitzherbert did not practice medicine in New Zealand but became a businessman.

They later moved to Willow Bank a house in Lower Hutt and entertained parliamentarians there (which may account for the street's name of "Parliament Street"). The house now has a Historic Places Trust "C" classification.

== Political career ==
He was elected an Alderman in the first council election ever held in Wellington in 1842.

=== Member of Parliament ===
New Zealand Parliament
Years	Term	Electorate	Party
1855–1858	2nd	Town of Wellington	Independent
1858–1860	2nd	Hutt	Independent
1860–1866	3rd	Hutt	Independent
1866–1870	4th	Hutt	Independent
1871–1875	5th	Hutt	Independent
1875–1879	6th	Hutt	Independent

He soon became active in politics, serving both on the Wellington Provincial Council and in the New Zealand Parliament. He was elected to the Wellington Provincial Council for the City of Wellington division at the 1853 New Zealand provincial elections. He was elected to the 2nd Parliament as a representative of the City of Wellington electorate, but resigned part way through the term to successfully seek election as representative for the Hutt electorate, which happened on 31 July 1858. He contested the general election on 29 December 1875 against William Hutchison and obtained 178 votes, with Hutchison receiving 38. He retained the Hutt electorate until his resignation in 1879, so that he could appointed to the Legislative Council. He also served as Colonial Treasurer (Minister of Finance) for the duration of Frederick Weld's premiership.

His younger son Henry represented the Hutt electorate from 1884–90. His other son, William, later became Mayor of Lower Hutt.

=== Wellington Province ===
Fitzherbert was Superintendent of the Wellington Province from 1871 until the abolition of the provinces in 1876. The Palmerston North suburb of Aokautere was once named after Fitzherbert, as he had promoted settlement of the Manawatu. The Fitzherbert East Dairy Factory building still carries the name these days.

=== Speaker of the House ===
He served as Speaker of the House of Representatives from 1876 until his appointment to the Legislative Council, and then as Speaker of the Legislative Council until his death.

He was appointed a Knight Commander of the Order of St Michael and St George in 1877.

== Death ==
Fitzherbert died on 6 February 1891 at his residence in Lower Hutt. He was buried at Lower Hutt cemetery on 10 February next to his late wife, who had died on 21 August 1886.

He was survived by his daughter and two sons; William Alfred Fitzherbert) (mayor) and Henry Samuel Fitzherbert (MP). His only daughter Alice Jane married Sir Patrick Buckley in 1869.

== Memorials ==
There are several streets in Wainuiomata bearing his name. The peak of the Eastern Hills dividing Naenae and Wainuiomata and its television relay mast is named Mount Fitzherbert.

== Notable descendents ==
- Henry Samuel Fitzherbert, son, member of parliament
- Mihi Edwards, great-granddaughter, writer, social worker, teacher and kaumātua

Political offices
Preceded by Reader Wood	Colonial Treasurer; 1864–1865	Succeeded by Edward Stafford
Preceded by Isaac Featherston	Superintendent of Wellington Province; 1871–1876	Provincial Councils abolished
Preceded by Dillon Bell	Speaker of the New Zealand House of Representatives; 1876–1879	Succeeded by Maurice O'Rorke
Preceded by John Richardson	Speaker of the New Zealand Legislative Council; 1879–1887; 1887–1891	Succeeded by George Waterhouse
Preceded by George Waterhouse	Speaker of the New Zealand Legislative Council; 1879–1887; 1887–1891	Succeeded by Harry Atkinson
New Zealand Parliament
Preceded by Robert Hart; James Kelham	Member of Parliament for Wellington; 1855–1858; Served alongside: Isaac Featherston, Charles Clifford	Succeeded by William Barnard Rhodes
Preceded by Dillon Bell; Samuel Revans	Member of Parliament for Hutt; 1858–1879; Served alongside: Alfred Renall, Alfred Ludlam	Succeeded by Henry Jackson
