= New Zealand Gazette and Wellington Spectator =

The New Zealand Gazette was New Zealand's first newspaper. First published in London in 1839, it was published in Wellington, New Zealand, from 1840 to 1844. It had name changes in 1840 and was known as the New Zealand Gazette and Britannia Spectactor (from 22 August 1840) and the New Zealand Gazette and Wellington Spectactor (from 28 November 1840).

The Gazette was first published in London under the auspices of the New Zealand Company on 21 August 1839. A revised edition was issued a fortnight later. The second issue was published on 18 April 1840 in Wellington, making it the first newspaper printed in New Zealand.

The Gazette changed title several times in 1840. In August it added the words "and Britannia spectator"; Britannia was the proposed name for Wellington. In November it changed Britannia to Wellington.

The paper was initially owned and edited by Samuel Revans but it was always perceived as the mouthpiece of the New Zealand Company. It supported the Company in its incessant conflict with the colonial administration in Auckland. The vigour with which the Gazette did battle with the enemies of the Company alienated many of the public and in 1842 led settlers in Wellington to start a rival newspaper, the New Zealand Colonist and Port Nicholson Advertiser.

The Gazette expired quietly in September 1844. Volume V number 363 published on 25 September 1844 was the last edition published. The printers of the Gazette were employed by the New Zealand Spectator and Cook's Strait Guardian which began a few weeks later.
