= List of New Zealand women botanists =

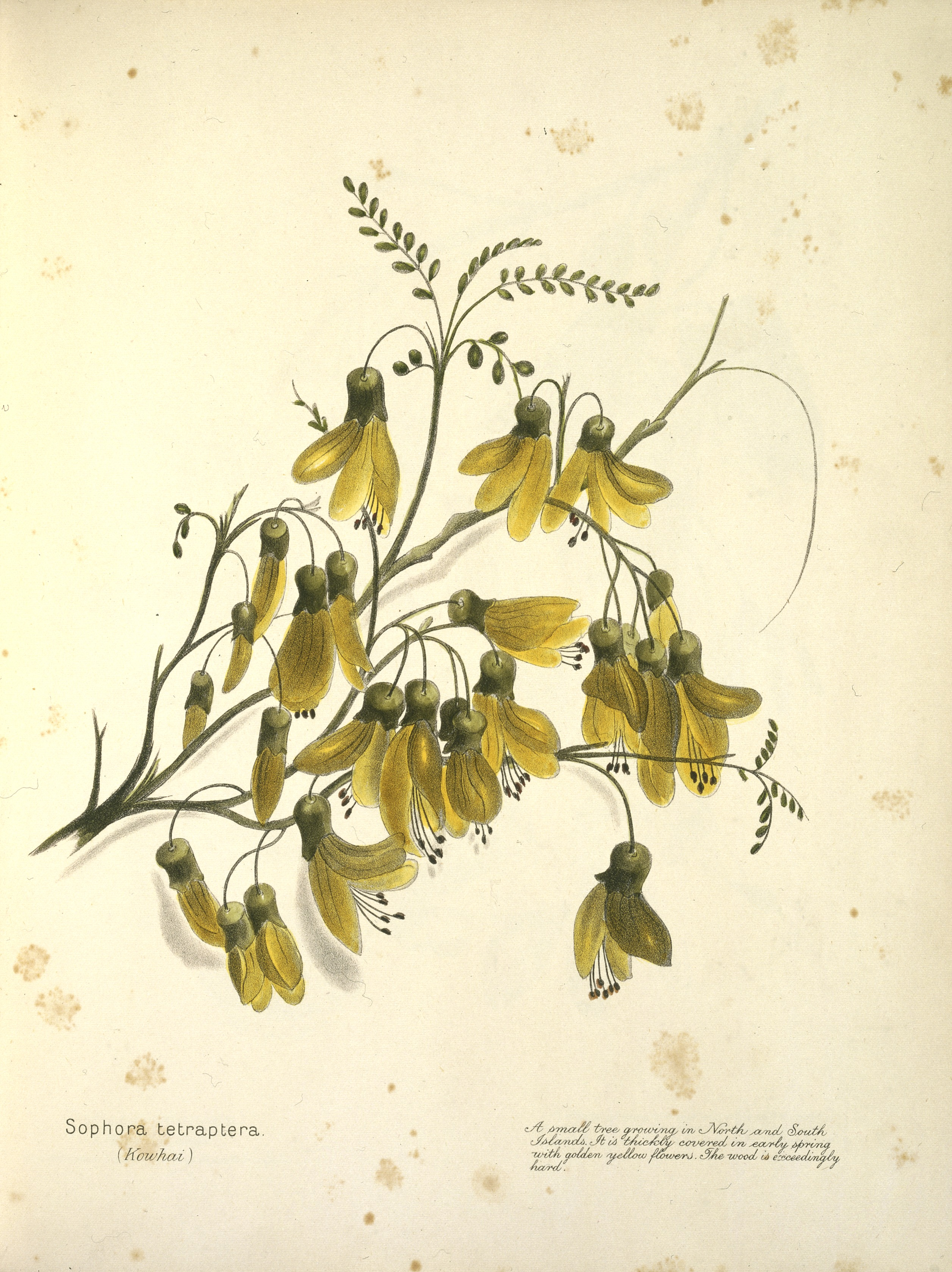
Illustration of Sophora tetraptera (kowhai) by Emily Cumming Harris

The following is a list of New Zealand women botanists, plant collectors and other notable women who have made contributions to the field of botany. This list is in alphabetical order by surname.

== A ==
- Nancy Adams

== B ==
- Ellen Wright Blackwell
- Shona M. Bell

== C ==
- Ella Orr Campbell
- Anne Maria Chapman
- Beverley Clarkson
- Vivienne Cassie Cooper
- Lucy Cranwell
- Kathleen Maisey Curtis

== D ==
- Helen Kirkland Dalrymple
- Joan Dingley

== E ==
- Audrey Eagle

== F ==
- Sarah Featon

== G ==
- Elsie Mary Griffin

== H ==
- Emily Cumming Harris
- Elizabeth Herriott
- Eliza Amy Hodgson

== J ==
- Paula Jameson
- Emma Jones

== K ==
- Martha King

== M ==
- Ruth Mason
- Barbara Mitcalfe
- Betty Molesworth Allen (1913–2002)
- Lucy Beatrice Moore

== N ==
- Wendy Nelson

== O ==
- Fanny Osborne

== S ==
- Rosa Olga Sansom
- Elizabeth Stack
- Emily Stevens
- Greta Stevenson
- Jean Struthers
- Mary Sutherland

== T ==
- Grace Marie Taylor

== See also ==
- List of botanists
- List of botanists by author abbreviation
