= 1865 Gold Fields by-election =

New Zealand by-election

A by-election was held in the Gold Fields electorate on 29 May 1865. The by-election was won by Charles Edward Haughton, who defeated two other candidates.

== Background ==
The Gold Fields electorate was a two-member constituency, and William Baldwin and George Brodie were the initial representatives starting with the 1863 supplementary election. Baldwin resigned, and this triggered the by-election. His resignation took effect on 27 April 1865, but it was known about well before that date. Henry Wirgman Robinson was appointed as returning officer, and he set the date for the nomination meeting for Monday, 22 May, with an election to be held if required the following Monday. Robinson also defined the polling places: thirteen courthouses throughout Otago, and six campsites.

== Run up to the election ==
Charles Edward Haughton of Arrowtown was the first person to declare his candidacy; he was first mentioned in the newspapers on 12 April. The local Queenstown newspaper, the Lake Wakatip Mail, came out in strong opposition to Haughton and thought him unqualified to represent the electorate.

Other candidates were Messrs Manders of Queenstown, James Benn Bradshaw, Duncan Campbell, and Jackson.

=== Nomination meeting ===
The nomination meeting was held at the courthouse in Lawrence, the centre of the Tuapeka district. Manders and Jackson were delayed and could not get to the meeting in time, and their nominations were not allowed. Campbell won the show of hands at the nomination meeting by a large margin, and a poll was demanded on behalf of Haughton.

== Election ==
Haughton received 227 votes out of a total of 506; his majority was 78 votes. Bradshaw came second with 149 votes. Campbell received 130 votes.

1865 Gold Fields by-election
Party	Candidate	Votes	%	±%
Independent	Charles Edward Haughton	227	44.86	
Independent	James Benn Bradshaw	149	29.45	
Independent	Duncan Campbell	130	25.69	
Majority		78	15.42	
Turnout		506		

Bradshaw put a protest to the returning officer regarding the deputy returning officer at Nevis not having received the official instructions until after the close of the poll. The returning officer declared that his deputy at Nevis had been sworn in as required, and that the instructions had not arrived in time was immaterial as no elector had come to the polling station during the day. The table below shows the results for the individual polling stations.

Sortable and collapsible table
Polling station	Haughton	Bradshaw	Campbell
Alexandra	32	18	0
Arrow	62	0	0
Blackstone Hill	0	11	0
Cardrona	23	0	0
Clyde	0	16	0
Cromwell	9	6	0
Dunstan Creek	2	4	9
Hamilton	0	7	8
Hindon	2	1	8
Hyde	0	0	21
Lawrence	40	3	64
Maori Point	16	19	5
Mount Benger	0	18	2
Mount Ida	0	0	1
Nevis	0	0	0
Nokomai	0	9	0
Queenstown	17	32	2
Waipori	18	1	1
Waitahuna	6	4	9
total	227	149	130

Haughton represented the Gold Fields electorate until the end of the term in 1866, and was then successful in the 1866 election in the Hampden electorate. Bradshaw stood in the 1866 election in the Gold Field Towns electorate and was also returned.

== Citations ==
- Wilson, Jim (1985) [First published in 1913]. New Zealand Parliamentary Record, 1840–1984 (4th ed.). Wellington: V.R. Ward, Govt. Printer. OCLC 154283103.
