= Emma Jones =

Emma Jones may refer to:

- Emma Jones (poet) (born 1977), Australian poet
- Emma Jones (journalist) (born 1975), Welsh journalist
- Emma Jones (cyclist) (born 1978), English cyclist
- Emma Jones (footballer, born 1982), Welsh footballer
- Emma Jones (footballer, born 1994), England-born Welsh footballer
- Emma Jones (naturalist) (1835–after 1881), New Zealand author, botanist and painter
- Emma Jones (cricketer) (born 2002), English cricketer
- Emma Jones (1813–1842), British painter with the married name Emma Soyer
