= Gold Fields (electorate) =

The Gold Fields District electorate was a 19th-century parliamentary electorate in the Otago region, New Zealand. It was created in 1862, with the first elections in the following year, and it returned two members. It was one of eventually three special interest constituencies created to meet the needs of gold miners. All three of these electorates were abolished in 1870. A unique feature of the Gold Fields District was that it was superimposed over other electorates, and voting was open to those who had held a mining license for some time. As such, suffrage was more relaxed than elsewhere in New Zealand, as voting was otherwise tied to property ownership. Another feature unique to the gold mining electorates was that no electoral rolls were prepared, but voting could be done upon showing a complying miner's license.

== Population centres ==
The Gold Fields electorate was superimposed on existing Otago electorates. It covered all areas where gold mining was undertaken. The electorates over which it was originally superimposed were Wallace, Hampden, and Bruce. An electoral redistribution was carried out in 1865 that applied from the 1866 election, and in addition to the three original electorates, the Gold Fields electorate was superimposed over Oamaru, Manuherikia, Waikouaiti, Taieri, and Clutha. From 1866, ten gold mining towns across Otago were covered by the Gold Field Towns electorate instead of the Gold Fields electorate, and they were Queenstown, Arrowtown, Cromwell, Clyde, Alexandra, Dunstan Creek, Roxburgh, Hamiltons, Lawrence, and Havelock.

== History ==
The electorate was created in 1862 because of the large influx of people to Otago during the Otago gold rush. Under the Miners' Representation Act, 1862 (which repealed an 1860 Act), the franchise was extended to males aged 21 years and over who had held a miner's right continuously for at least three (or six) months. No electoral rolls were established for these districts, and to vote a miner just presented his miner's licence to the election official. Outside Otago in electorates where no special Gold Fields electorate existed, miners could register as electors in the ordinary electoral district where they lived. There were complaints from miners who had destroyed their expired miner's licence and could not refer to official records.

The first election in the Gold Fields electorate was a supplementary election in 1863 for two members; at the same time, supplementary elections for one member each were held for the new electorates of Dunedin and Suburbs North and Dunedin and Suburbs South. The Gold Fields election on 14 April 1863 returned two members unopposed: William Baldwin and George Brodie. Baldwin's resignation was received on 27 April 1865. Charles Edward Haughton won the resulting 1865 by-election held on 29 May contested by three candidates.

In the 1866 election, two members were returned unopposed on 26 February: Charles O'Neill and Julius Vogel. It is unclear why, on 28 February, Vogel stood in the Waikouaiti electorate, where he was defeated by William Murison.

When the gold rush migrated to the West Coast, a further gold mining electorate was created there in 1867: Westland Boroughs. All three gold mining electorates were abolished through the 1870 electoral redistribution, with electorate boundaries set based on the 1867 census results aiming for equal populations across the electorates.

=== Members of Parliament ===
Gold Fields was a two-member electorate, and was represented by five MPs from 1863 to 1870:

Election	Winners	
1863 supplementary election	William Baldwin (Independent)	George Brodie (Independent)
1865 by-election	Charles Edward Haughton (Independent)	George Brodie (Independent)
1866 election	Julius Vogel (Independent)	Charles O'Neill (Independent)

== Election results ==
=== 1865 by-election ===
1865 Gold Fields by-election
Party	Candidate	Votes	%	±%
Independent	Charles Edward Haughton	227	44.86	
Independent	James Benn Bradshaw	149	29.45	
Independent	Duncan Campbell	130	25.69	
Majority		78	15.42	
Turnout		506		
