= 1873 Wakatipu by-election =

New Zealand by-election

The 1873 Wakatipu by-election was a by-election held on 19 August 1873 in the Wakatipu electorate during the 5th New Zealand Parliament.

The by-election was caused by the resignation of the incumbent MP Bendix Hallenstein on 17 July 1873.

The by-election was won by Vincent Pyke, described as a Government supporter.

It appears that four people were nominated on 16 August, and a poll was held on 19 August. H. Manders won the "show of hands", but may have lost through accidentally being prevented from visiting Cardrona, Macetown, etc.

The other candidates were Vincent Pyke, George Elliott Barton and Alexander Innes.

== Results ==
1873 Wakatipu by-election
Party	Candidate	Votes	%	±%
Independent	Vincent Pyke	226	38.18	
Independent	Henry Manders	192	32.43	
Independent	Alexander Innes	174	29.39	
Independent	George Elliott Barton	101	17.06	
Majority		34	5.74	
Turnout		196		
