= Peter Finn =

Australian politician (1827/28 – 1911)

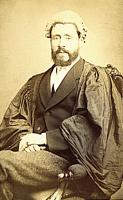
- Peter Finn in courtroom dress

Member of the Victorian Parliament for Avoca
- In office 25 July 1870 – 25 January 1871

Personal details
- Born: Peter Thomas Finn; 1827/1828 Ireland
- Died: 1 April 1911 Fitzroy, Victoria, Australia
- Spouse: Rosa Helen Finn (née Champ)
- Relations: Hugh Finn (brother)
- Profession: Barrister

Peter Thomas Finn (1827/1828 – 1 April 1911) was a barrister in Victoria, Australia and Invercargill, New Zealand. For a short time, he was a member of the Victorian Legislative Assembly for the electorate of Avoca.

== Biography ==
Finn was born in Ireland in either 1827 or 1828. The MP Hugh Finn was a younger brother. He commenced his tertiary education at Queen's College, Galway, Ireland. He emigrated to Victoria in the 1850s and matriculated into the University of Melbourne in 1857, obtaining his BA in the following year and his MA in 1874.

In 1859, he was admitted as a barrister to the Supreme Court of Victoria, practising in Melbourne and Ballarat. On 25 July 1870, he was elected to the Victorian Legislative Assembly in a by-election following the resignation of James Macpherson Grant. He served from October 1870 until January 1871, when he was defeated by Grant at the 1871 election. Finn had previously unsuccessfully stood for election in Avoca (1861). Subsequently, he was unsuccessful in Grenville (1871) and St Kilda (1872).

Finn sailed to Invercargill in 1876 and had entered a law partnership with Richard Matthews by February 1877. From 1880 until 1889, he was in partnership with Robert Henry Rattray.

He married Rosa Helen Champ, daughter of Colonel Champ from Darra in Victoria, on 6 March 1878 at Invercargill. She died on 13 June 1885, aged 37, and was buried at Invercargill's Saint John's Cemetery.

Finn supported the election campaign of Patrick McCaughan, who successfully contested the 1879 election in the Riverton electorate, and of Henry Feldwick, who was defeated in the Invercargill electorate. He himself considered contesting the Wakatipu electorate in the Lake District, but stood back in favour of his brother, who was successful. He contested the 1881 election in the Hokonui electorate against Henry Driver and Cuthbert Cowan, in which Driver was elected and Finn came a distant last; this marked the end of Finn's parliamentary ambitions in New Zealand, as he did not contest the subsequent elections in 1884 or 1887.

Returning to Victoria in around 1890, he briefly practised law in Melbourne and Ballarat before moving to Geelong. His remaining years were spent in Meredith. He died on 1 April 1911 at Fitzroy, probably at St Vincent's Hospital. He was survived by one son who, at the time of Finn's death, lived in Perth.

Victorian Legislative Assembly
Preceded by James Macpherson Grant; Benjamin George Davies	Member for Avoca; 1870–1871; Served alongside: Benjamin George Davies	Succeeded by James Macpherson Grant; Benjamin George Davies
