= Henry Manders =

New Zealand politician (1829–1891)

Isaac Henry Manders (11 July 1829 – 5 January 1891) was a New Zealand politician who was a Member of Parliament in the Otago region.

Manders was born in England and baptised in Finsbury, London. He lived in Australia in the 1850s and 1860s with his wife, Dorothea Coleman Hyde. Their son Thomas Charles (born and died in 1854) was born in Kilmore, Victoria, followed by the birth of their daughter, Dorothea Charlotte (later McJunkin; 1856–1924) in Prahran, Victoria and their son Theodore Richard (1862–63) in Geelong, Victoria.

New Zealand Parliament
Years	Term	Electorate	Party
1876–1879	6th	Wakatipu	Independent

Manders was one of three candidates in the Gold Field Towns electorate in the 1866 election, when he came a distant last to James Benn Bradshaw.

Manders came second in the 1873 by-election for the Wakatipu electorate but represented it from 1876 to 1879, when he was defeated.

He was descended from the wealthy Manders of Dublin, born in London, and educated at Rugby School. He had been on the Otago Provincial Council, and employed by local councils.

He died in Queenstown aged 62 One report said his abilities were "misdirected" and he had been "on the spree".

New Zealand Parliament
Preceded by Vincent Pyke	Member of Parliament for Wakatipu; 1876–1879	Succeeded by Hugh Finn
