= 1872 Wakatipu by-election =

New Zealand by-election

The 1872 Wakatipu by-election was a by-election held on 13 March 1872 in the Wakatipu electorate during the 5th New Zealand Parliament.

The by-election was caused by the resignation of the incumbent MP Charles Edward Haughton on 21 December 1871.

The by-election was won by Bendix Hallenstein, a "local".

It appears that Mr James Miller (a miner) was offered "a consideration" to stand down in favour of Mr James Macassey (a Dunedin lawyer), and a legal argument involving the editor of the Lake Wakatip Mail developed, with talk of a "libel action" and whether if the money was to a local charity was it still "a consideration".

== Results ==
1872 Wakatipu by-election
Party	Candidate	Votes	%	±%
Independent	Bendix Hallenstein	432	63.53	
Independent	James Macassey	220	22.35	
Independent	J. Miller	28	4.12	
Turnout		537		
Majority		151	28.12	
