= William Fraser (New Zealand politician, born 1840) =

New Zealand politician (1840–1923)

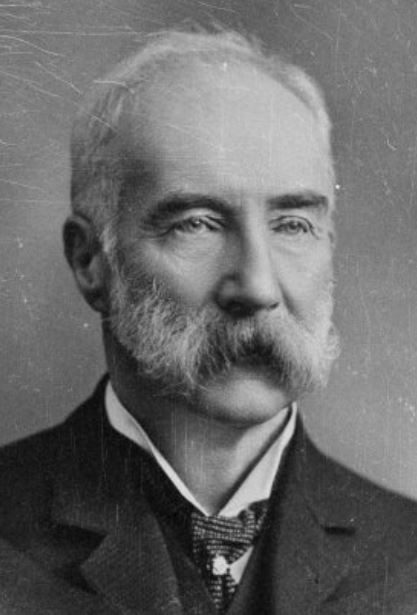
William Fraser c. 1900

Sir William Fraser KCVO (1840 – 16 July 1923) was an Independent Conservative then Reform Party member of parliament in New Zealand.

== Biography ==
=== Early life ===
Fraser was born in India, the son of Captain Hugh Fraser of the 5th Madras Light Cavalry. He received his education at Elizabeth College in Guernsey, Victoria College in Jersey, and the Lycée de St Brieuc in Brittany, France. He came to New Zealand in September 1858 for farming. Together with Alfred Rowland Chetham-Strode, he took up Earnscleugh Station on the Earnscleugh River. In 1874, he married Ellen Isabel Strode, the daughter of his business partner, in 1874.

=== Political career ===
New Zealand Parliament
Years	Term	Electorate	Party
1893–1896	12th	Wakatipu	Independent
1896–1899	13th	Wakatipu	Independent
1899–1902	14th	Wakatipu	Independent
1902–1905	15th	Wakatipu	Independent
1905–1908	16th	Wakatipu	Independent
1908–1909	17th	Wakatipu	Independent
1909–1911	Changed allegiance to:		Reform
1911–1914	18th	Wakatipu	Reform
1914–1919	19th	Wakatipu	Reform

Fraser was a member of the Otago Provincial Council (1867–1870). He was a member of the inaugural Vincent County from 1877 until 1893, the last ten years as chairman. He won the Wakatipu electorate in the 1893 general election, and retired in 1919. He served on the Legislative Council from 1919 to 1923 when he died.

Under Prime Minister William Massey, he was Minister of Public Works (10 July 1912 – 3 April 1920), Minister of Mines (10 July 1912 – 12 August 1915; 4 September 1919 – 27 July 1920), Minister of Industries and Commerce (10 July 1912 – 26 July 1912) and a Member of the Executive Council (without portfolio; 27 July 1920 – 16 July 1923).

Fraser was widely criticised as Minister of Public Works for using railway branch lines as "electoral bait" particularly in the South Island and for not adopting new techniques.

=== Later life and death ===
He was appointed a Knight Bachelor on 6 February 1918 and, on the occasion of the royal visit by Edward, Prince of Wales to Australia and New Zealand, a Knight Commander of the Royal Victorian Order in 1920.

Fraser died on 16 July 1923 at Wellington after a short illness of only three weeks. His wife had died many years before him. William Massey, the Prime Minister, commented on his death: "there came to an end one of the most useful careers of this country." His funeral service was held at Old St. Paul's in Wellington, and he was buried at Karori Cemetery.

== Notes ==
New Zealand Parliament
Preceded by Thomas Fergus	Member of Parliament for Wakatipu; 1893–1919	Succeeded by James Horn
