= James Horn (politician) =

New Zealand politician (1855–1932)

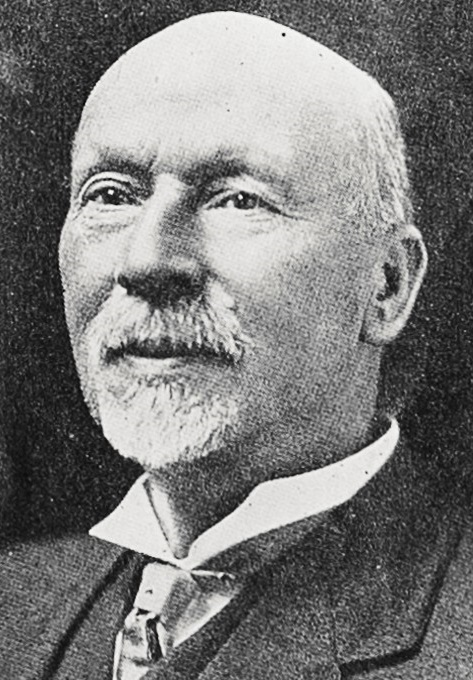

Member of the New Zealand Parliament for Wakatipu
- In office 1919–1928
- Preceded by: William Fraser

Personal details
- Born: 5 February 1855 Banffshire, Scotland
- Died: 11 December 1932 (aged 77) Dunedin, New Zealand
- Party: Liberal

James Horn (5 February 1855 – 11 December 1932) was a Liberal Party Member of Parliament from Otago, New Zealand.

== Biography ==
=== Early life ===
Horn was born in Inverkethney, Banffshire, Scotland and came to Otago in 1879. He was a storekeeper at Bannockburn, Otago from 1883 to 1928, when he moved to Dunedin.

=== Political career ===
New Zealand Parliament
Years	Term	Electorate	Party
1919–1922	20th	Wakatipu	Liberal
1922–1925	21st	Wakatipu	Liberal
1925–1928	22nd	Wakatipu	Liberal
1928	Changed allegiance to:		United

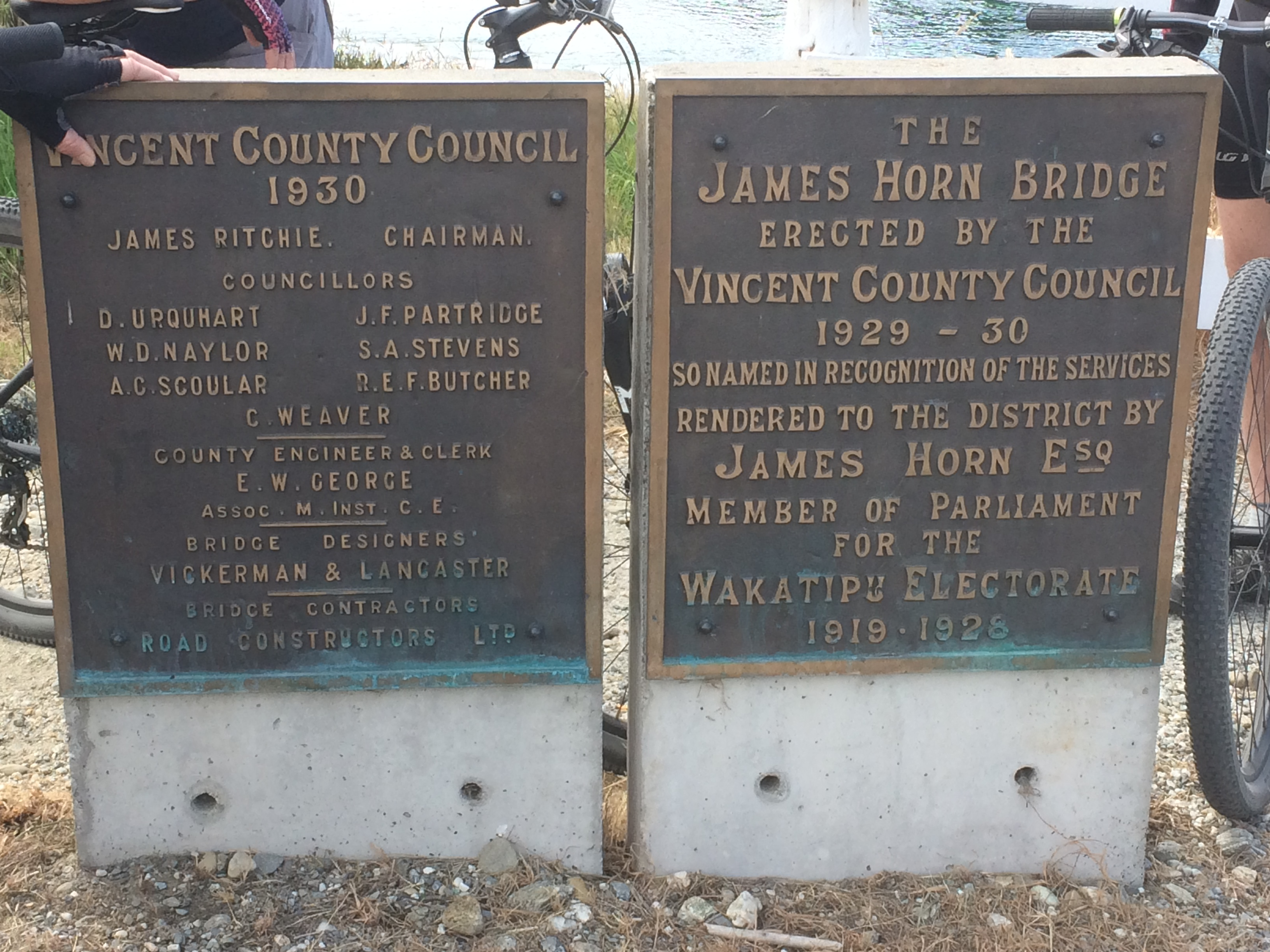
Memorial tablet at the James Horn Bridge

He won the Wakatipu electorate in the 1919 general election, and held it to 1928, when he retired. In parliament he supported construction of the Otago Central Railway to Clyde and then Cromwell, and the breaking-up of large estates. A bridge on what is now State Highway 6 over the Clutha River at Albert Town opened in 1930 and was named James Horn Bridge.

From 1920 until 1925 he was the Liberal Party's junior whip.

== Notes ==
New Zealand Parliament
Preceded by William Fraser	Member of Parliament for Wakatipu; 1919–1928	Constituency abolished
