= Thomas Fergus =

New Zealand politician

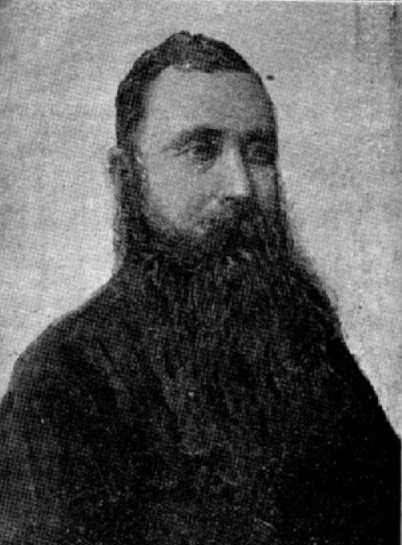
Thomas Fergus

Thomas Fergus (6 April 1850 or 1851 – 29 September 1914) was a 19th-century New Zealand politician.

== Early life ==
Thomas Fergus was born in Ayr, Scotland on 6 April 1850. There is some question as to his date of birth as the New Zealand Government records are two years different from this birth record, and his newspaper obituary gives 1851 as the birth year.

His father was also Thomas Fergus. It is uncertain when his father was born as there is no birth certificate to coincide with the date of 1815, however there is record of him in both 1851 and 1861 census for Scotland, and the age in those suggest that his birth was in 1807. His mother Annie McGechin is also found in census records but no birth certificate has been found to verify her date of birth, although the census suggests her date of birth to be in 1810. In the 1851 census for Scotland the household included his paternal grandmother Elizabeth Fergus. The family is registered as living in Gordon Place, St Quivox, Ayr at the time of the 1861 Census for Scotland and included seven surviving children (Elizabeth, Thomas, Martha Grange, Robert, John, Ann, Margaret). He was the second to eldest and the eldest son.

He initially travelled to Melbourne on the Esmerelda in the early 1860s. It is thought that he may have travelled with two sisters and a brother, although this needs to be verified. He later travelled on to New Zealand in 1869. He was educated in both Melbourne and at the University of Otago in Dunedin, New Zealand from 1872 to 1876 and worked as a civil engineer.

== Family and personal life ==
On 8 July 1874 he married Letticia Mckay at Hampden, North Otago, at the house of her father. They had one daughter, Margaret Annie, born in 1875 at Cromwell, Otago. Letticia died at Hampden on 27 September 1876, aged 22. She is buried in the Hampden cemetery.

On 31 July 1878, he married Margaret MacGregor Reid, daughter of his business partner Donald Reid. The marriage was conducted at Reid's residence Salisbury in North Taieri. They had four daughters, Fanny Stewart Fergus, Annie Grange Fergus (who became a doctor and served overseas during World War One) Daisy MacGregor Reid Fergus, Elizabeth (Bessie) Barr Fergus.

== Political career ==
New Zealand Parliament
Years	Term	Electorate	Party
1881–1884	8th	Wakatipu	Independent
1884–1887	9th	Wakatipu	Independent
1887–1890	10th	Wakatipu	Independent
1890–1893	11th	Wakatipu	Independent

Fergus considered standing in the Otago electorate of Wakatipu electorate in the 1879 election, but decided against it. He represented Wakatipu in Parliament from 1881 to 1893, when he retired. He was Minister of Defence (1887–1889), Minister of Justice (1887–1889), Minister of Public Works (1889–1891) and Minister of Education (1889–1891).

== Death and commemoration ==
Fergus died on 29 September 1914. Lake Fergus, a small lake between Lake Te Anau and Milford Sound and adjacent to the State Highway 94 (the Milford Sound Road) in Fiordland National Park, is named after him. William H. Homer (after whom the Homer Tunnel is named) and George Barber named it on 4 January 1889 after the then Member of Parliament for the Wakatipu electorate. After a brief ceremony, they "drank his health from a bottle of painkiller".

== Notes ==
Political offices
Preceded by Joseph Tole	Minister of Justice; 1887–1889	Succeeded by William Russell
New Zealand Parliament
Preceded by Hugh Finn	Member of Parliament for Wakatipu; 1881–1893	Succeeded by William Fraser
