= Elizabeth Stack =

New Zealand settler and botanist

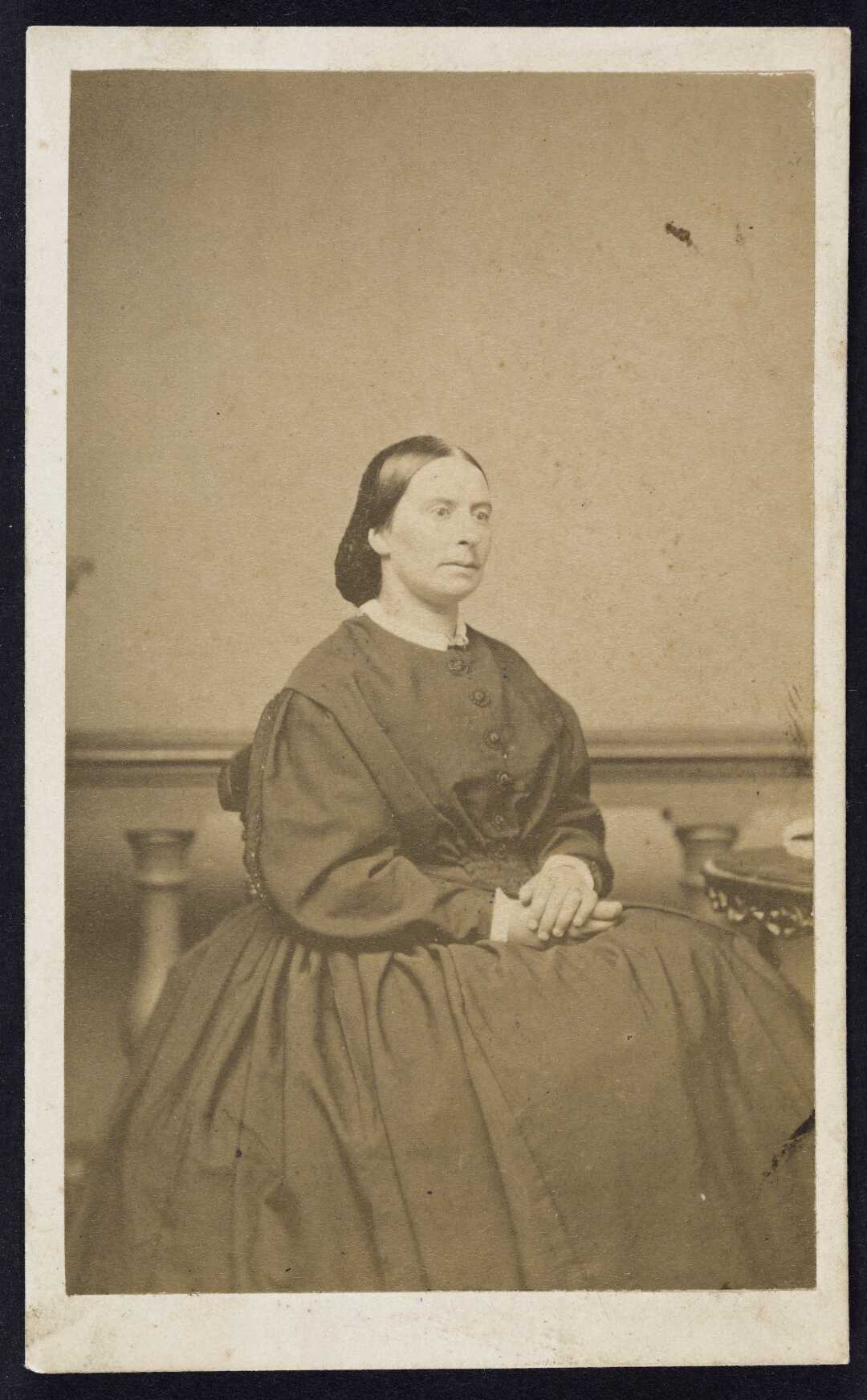
Elizabeth Stack, date unknown

Elizabeth (Eliza) Rachel Jean Stack (née Jones; 19 February 1829 – 2 December 1919) was a New Zealand settler, author and botanist.

Stack was born in Anglesey, Wales in 1829. She was the daughter of Humphrey Jones, the Controller of Customs at Holyhead. The youngest of nine, Stack was fourteen when she was orphaned, and went to live with relatives, variously in Edinburgh, Stockwell, and Barnstable. In 1856 Stack's brother Humphrey Jones, an Assistant Commissary-General, returned to England from the Crimean War. He was then ordered to New Zealand, and having recently been widowed, invited his sister to join him.

Jones and Stack travelled with a maid to New Zealand in 1857 aboard the Dinapore, a journey Stack describes as "long and tedious and not marked by any striking incidents". Stack enjoyed the musical talents of Andrew Buchanan's daughters, which helped to while away the four-month journey.

Stack describes collecting a variety of ferns on Waiheke Island with her sister-in-law Emma Jones (née Buchanan):

"The ferns and nikau palms were most graceful and gave the forest quite a tropical look. We found a great variety of small ferns of which Emma and I procured some good specimens for our collections." Huruhi, Waiheke Island, 25 February 1857.

Stack collected fern, lichen, seaweed and moss specimens as she travelled around New Zealand. In 1858 Stack was introduced by Mrs Wynyard to Dr Andrew Sinclair, a keen botanist, who offered to help her to identify items in her collection. Later that year, Stack describes a trip to the Pink and White Terraces where she was pleased to have ventured to the top of Te Tarata:

"We were very proud of having achieved the rarely accomplished feat and seized the opportunity to gather specimens of mosses and ferns which have never been dry and never felt cold. Some of the mosses were a foot high and we got three varieties of ferns which grew on the brink of the boiling pool, and procured healthy leaves which were dipping in the hot water. Manuka shrubs were thriving in the moist heat, as well as ferns and mosses." Te Tarata, p109

In her journal, Stack also describes collecting weta, lizards and stalactites for her 'museum'. In 1859 she says both Dr Sinclair and Captain Haultain (probably Theodore Haultain) offered to help organise her ferns. Stack's journal describes many occasions hunting ferns and mosses for her collection, often with her brother Humphrey and his wife Emma. On one such trip, in the Remutaka Ranges in 1859, she writes about meeting two botanists sent out by a gardening firm from England, who gave Stack's party some fronds of Lomaria elongata, and exchanged other specimens with Stack.

On 28 January 1861, Stack was married to missionary James West Stack by Bishop Selwyn, in St Stephens Chapel, Auckland. The Stacks lived at St Stephen's, Kaiapoi until 5 May 1870, when the buildings were destroyed by fire. After spending a year living in the empty orphanage in Addington, they moved first to Kaiapoi, before building a house on Armagh Street in Christchurch. They had three daughters and four sons. Reduced income due to the loss of Government appointments led to a move to Duvauchelle Bay in 1880. In 1895, the Stacks visited Eliza's brother in Bordighera (her diary says in Spain, but Bordighera is in Italy) for a year. In 1898, the Stacks left New Zealand permanently, living first with Humphrey Jones in Bordighera, and then in 1907, after his death, in Worthing, Sussex. Eliza died aged 90 in Worthing on 2 December 1919, seven weeks after her husband's death. Both are buried in the Christ Church graveyard in Worthing.
