= D.I.C. (department store) =

Defunct New Zealand department store chain

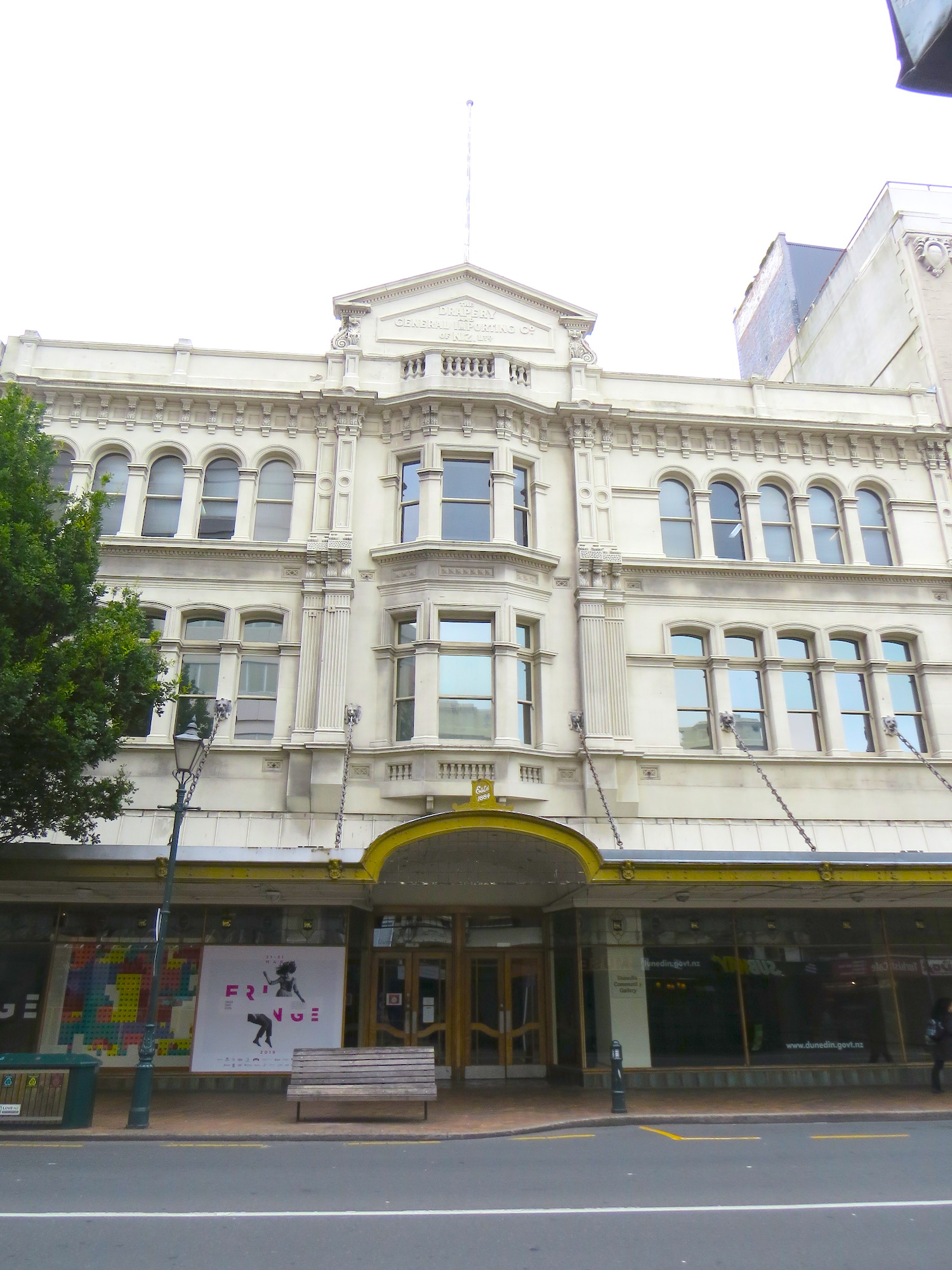
- Former flagship on Princes Street, Dunedin
- Founded: 1884
- Founder: Bendix Hallenstein
- Defunct: 1991
- Parent: Arthur Barnett (1988–1991)

The D.I.C. (originally the Drapery and General Importing Company of New Zealand Ltd) was a New Zealand department store chain, founded in Dunedin by Bendix Hallenstein in 1884.

It was bought out by one of its chief rivals, Arthur Barnett, in the 1980s. The site of the company's former headquarters and flagship store is now occupied by the Dunedin Public Art Gallery, although the façade of the Princes Street entrance still remains in largely original condition.

== History ==
Hallenstein opened the first Drapery and General Importing Company store in 1884 in Dunedin Central.

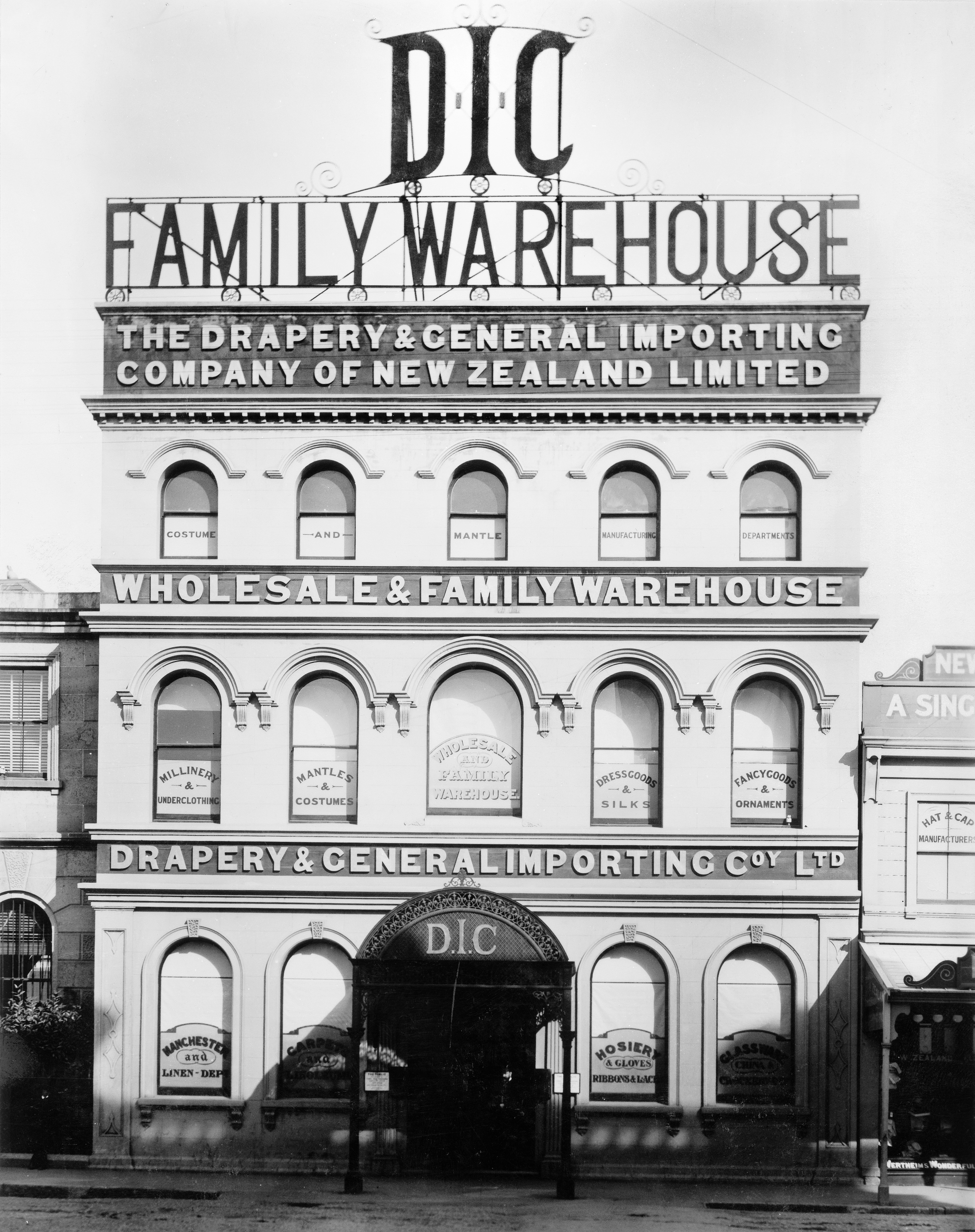
D.I.C's Christchurch building circa 1885.

A second store opened in Christchurch in 1885.

In 1977 D.I.C with the Canterbury Farmers Co-operative they took over the Beaths Department Store brand with D.I.C taking over the Cashel Street store and the Farmers Co-op took over the New Brighton store and the Ashburton store (which was closed as part of the takeover).

In 1978 Beaths and D.I.C merged and the Christchurch store was rebranded to D.I.C-Beaths. In 1979 D.I.C left their original building in Christchurch and moved into the Beaths building.

The chain had three stores in 1891, six stores by 1929, nine stores by 1976, and 16 stores by its takeover in 1988.

== Stores ==
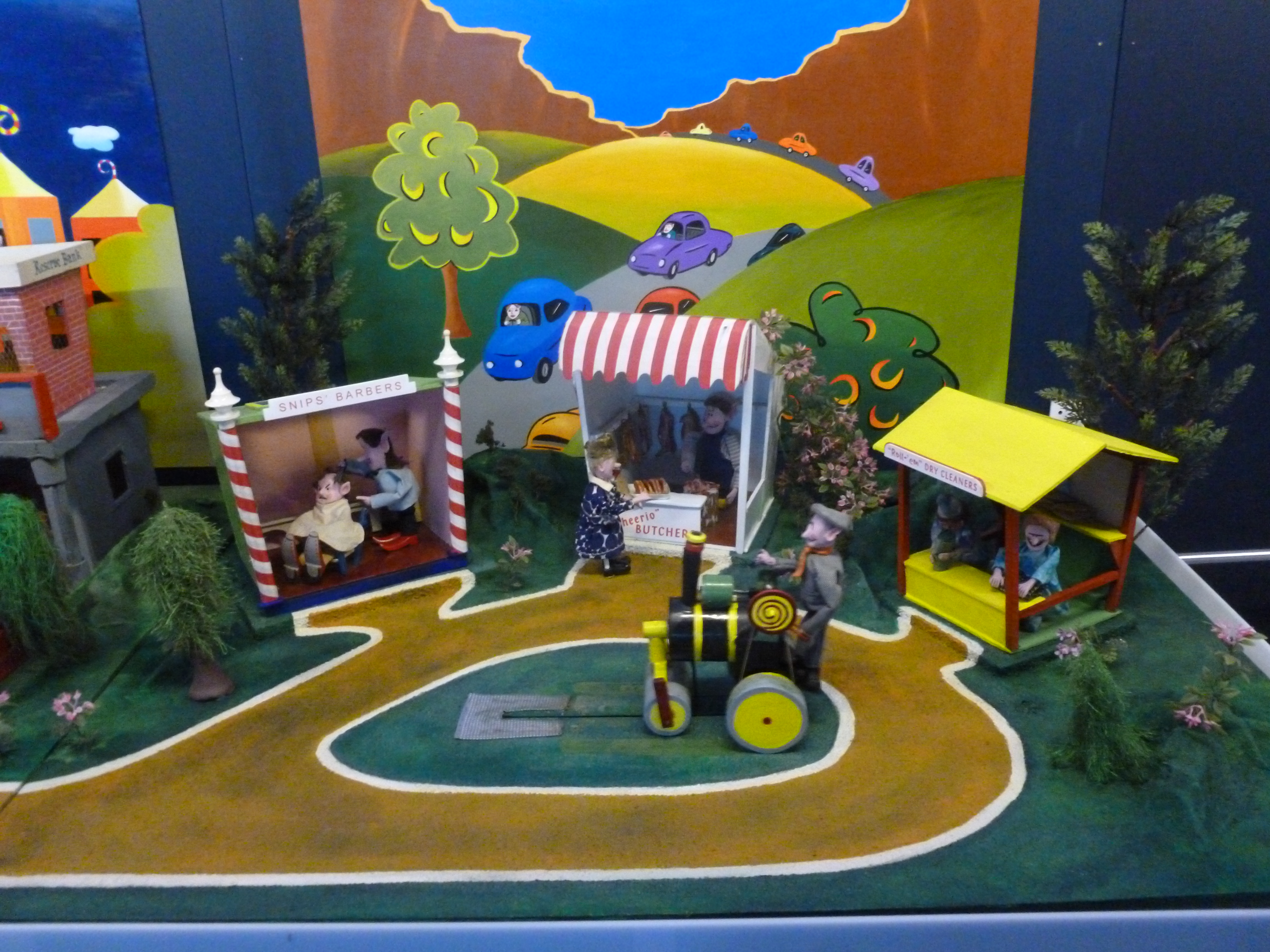
'Pixie Town' animatronic models from the Christmas display now at Toitū Otago Settlers Museum.

Prior to its takeover by Arthur Barnett, the D.I.C had stores in the following locations. Unless stated, they were rebranded as Arthur Barnett, with D.I.C. eventually closing in 1991:

- Dunedin, corner of The Octagon and Princes Street (original store – closed in 1991)
- Invercargill (rebranded Arthur Barnett in 1989) Closed in 1990 with Farmers relocating to site in 1991. Location most recently occupied by Art Fun Wear and was demolished in 2020 as part of a redevelopment of the entire city block.
- Christchurch, Cashel Street (opened in 1885, burned down in 1908 and rebuilt, merged with Beath's department store in 1978 and shifted into their premises, rebranding as Arthur Barnett/D.I.C, then again as Arthur Barnett, and closed in 2005)
- Wellington, Lambton Quay. Built 1928 on the site of the former D.I.C store, closed early 1980s. Building refurbished as the Harbour City Centre which opened March 1985. the Harbour City Centre is a registered Category 2 heritage landmark. The six-storey steel and concrete frame building consists of 2 storeys of retail and 4 storeys of offices. The building includes the Te Awe branch of Wellington City Libraries.
- Palmerston North – Former Milne & Choyce store, now the Palmerston North City Library. Rebranded as Arthur Barnett in 1989 and that store closed in 1992.
- Whanganui
- Hamilton – converted to the Central Library in Garden Place, which opened on 20 March 1993
- Napier
- Hastings (D.I.C Westermans)
- Lower Hutt, High St.
- Rotorua
- Pakuranga
- Takapuna
- Central Auckland (formerly George Court & Sons)
