= Hugh Finn =

New Zealand politician

Hugh Joseph Finn (1847 – 18 December 1927) was a 19th-century Member of Parliament in the Otago region of New Zealand.

== Biography ==
New Zealand Parliament
Years	Term	Electorate	Party
1879–1881	7th	Wakatipu	Independent

Finn was born in Kilkenny, Ireland, in 1847. He was a younger brother of Peter Finn. He was initially home-schooled and started attending Blackrock College in Blackrock near Dublin from the age of twelve. He then attended the Jesuit College in Amiens, France, and finally the Melbourne Church of England Grammar School in Australia. He went to the University of Melbourne for his tertiary education.

He joined the practice of George Godfrey in Melbourne as a clerk and passed his law exam.

In March 1874, he emigrated to New Zealand and arrived in Dunedin. In August of that year, he was admitted as a barrister and solicitor to the Supreme Court of New Zealand. He practised as a barrister in Queenstown. He was also manager of the Gladstone Gold-Mining Company. In early 1875, he travelled in New Zealand with judge Robert Molesworth from Victoria.

Finn married Lizzie McLean, daughter of John McLean of Kurow Station, on 20 February 1877 at Lawrence. They had a son in July 1878.

He stood for a county council election in November 1878 in the Kingston Riding and was beaten by 43 votes to 12. He contested the 1879 election as a supporter of George Grey against Henry Manders (the incumbent) and William Mason (a prominent architect who had moved to Queenstown in 1876). Mason won the show of hands at the nomination meeting. Thomas Fergus had also considered contesting Wakatipu, but he decided against it. Finn, Mason and Manders received 266, 236 and 143 votes, respectively. The Dunedin Herald commented after the election that Wakatipu voters had had a difficult choice between the incumbent Manders ("he had cut such a sorry figure [in Parliament] before"), Mason (who was supported by large land owners, which kept people from obtaining land for farming) and Finn (who was in a serious dispute with Queenstown's Resident Magistrate before the election). In the end, the voters decided for Finn, "the least of three evils". Finn represented the Wakatipu electorate from 1879 until the end of the parliamentary term in 1881, when he retired.

He later moved to Gisborne and practised there. He died in Tauranga on 18 December 1927.

New Zealand Parliament
Preceded by Henry Manders	Member of Parliament for Wakatipu; 1879–1881	Succeeded by Thomas Fergus
