= Gold Field Towns (electorate) =

The Gold Field Towns electorate was a 19th-century parliamentary electorate in the Otago region of New Zealand. It was the second gold mining electorate in Otago, one of three special interest constituencies created to meet the needs of gold miners; the third electorate was located on the West Coast. The Gold Field Towns electorate was in 1865, with the first (and only) elections in the following year, and it returned one member. All three of these special interest electorates were abolished in 1870. A unique feature of the Gold Field Towns electorate was that it covered ten separate towns within the area of the Gold Fields, which in turn was overlaid of a number of general electorates in the Otago area. Voting was open to those who had held a mining license for some time. As such, suffrage was more relaxed than elsewhere in New Zealand, as voting was otherwise tied to property ownership. Another feature unique to the gold mining electorates was that no electoral rolls were prepared, but voting could be done upon showing a complying miner's license.

== Population centres ==
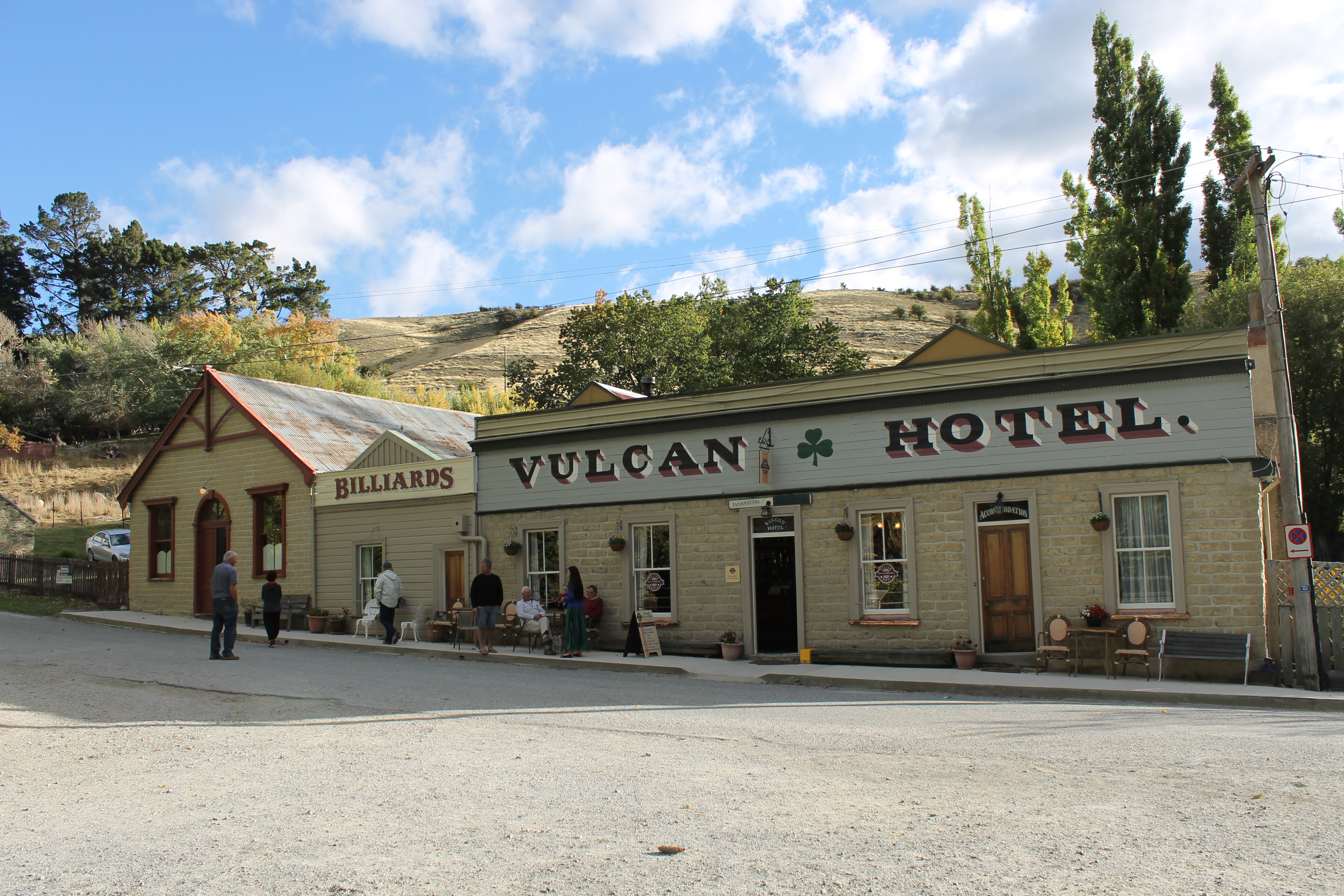
Saint Bathans, then more commonly known as Dunstan Creek, was one of ten towns covered by the Gold Field Towns electorate; no votes were cast at the local polling station in 1866

Gold Field Towns was the second gold mining electorate created in Otago. The first mining electorate, Gold Fields, had been created in 1862 and had been superimposed on most of Otago and Southland. An electoral redistribution was carried out in 1865 that applied from the 1866 election. From 1866, ten gold mining towns across Otago were covered by the Gold Field Towns electorate instead of the Gold Fields electorate, and they were Queenstown, Arrowtown, Cromwell, Clyde, Alexandra, Dunstan Creek (Saint Bathans), Roxburgh, Hamiltons, Lawrence, and Havelock.

== History ==
Gold mining electorates were created because of the large influx of people to Otago during the Otago gold rush. Under the Miners' Representation Act, 1862, the franchise was extended to males aged 21 years and over who had held a miner's right continuously for at least three (or six) months. No electoral rolls were established for these districts, and to vote a miner just presented his miner's licence to the election official. Outside Otago where no special gold mining electorate existed, miners could register as electors in the ordinary electoral district where they lived.

The Gold Field Towns electorate existed from 1866 to 1870 for the term of the 4th New Zealand Parliament. It was a single-member electorate and during the time of its existence, it was represented by James Benn Bradshaw. The 1866 election was contested by three candidates: James Benn Bradshaw, David Forsyth Main, and Henry Manders. Bradshaw narrowly won the election over Main, with Manders coming a distant last.

== Members of Parliament ==
The electorate was represented by one MP.

Election	Winner
1866 election	James Benn Bradshaw (Independent)

== Election results ==
=== 1866 election ===
1866 general election: Gold Field Towns
Party	Candidate	Votes	%	±%
Independent	James Benn Bradshaw	73	48.67	
Independent	David Forsyth Main	70	46.67	
Independent	Henry Manders	7	4.67	
Majority		3	2.00	
Turnout		150		

Individual results by polling station were as follows:

Sortable and collapsible table
Polling station	Bradshaw	Main	Manders
Clyde	33	4	0
Alexandra	8	0	0
Arrow	0	24	1
Queenstown	15	3	0
Cromwell	10	2	4
Hamilton	0	0	0
Dunstan Creek (Saint Bathans)	0	0	0
Havelock	1	8	0
Lawrence	6	29	1
Roxburgh	0	0	1
total	73	70	7
