= Emily Harris (artist) =

New Zealand teacher and artist

- Born: Emily Cumming Harris; 1837; Plymouth, Devon, England
- Died: 1925 (aged 87–88); Nelson, New Zealand
- Known for: Painting, botanical illustration

Emily Cumming Harris (28 March 1836 – 5 August 1925) was one of New Zealand's first professional women painters. She chiefly painted New Zealand plants and flowers and worked mainly in water colour. She was born in Plymouth, Devon, England in about 1837 but spent most of her life in Nelson, New Zealand.

== Early life ==
Harris was the second daughter of five children of Sarah Hill and her husband Edwin Harris. The Harris family emigrated from England on the "William Bryan", a ship of the Plymouth Company of New Zealand. They reached New Zealand on 31 March 1841. Harris' father was a civil engineer and surveyor as well as a competent artist who supported his daughters efforts in painting. Her mother was a teacher who established a primary school in Taranaki. Harris subsequently became an assistant teacher at that school.

Following the outbreak of the First Taranaki War in March 1860, Harris was sent to Hobart to study while her family moved to Nelson. After spending several years in Australia she returned to Nelson where she joined her sisters in running a small primary school and giving private lessons in music, dancing and drawing. She continued to paint but sales of her work were never sufficient to allow her to give up teaching to concentrate on her art full-time. In 1890 Harris arranged for the family to hold an exhibition of her own and her father's and sister's art work, which raised sufficient funds to pay the family's debts. This was after the family faced financial difficulties when Edwin Harris retired from teaching in 1889 (aged around 83).

== Exhibitions ==
Harris showed her work at exhibitions in New Zealand and overseas. In 1879 she exhibited at the Sydney International Exhibit where she was awarded a first degree of merit. She also exhibited at the 1880 - 1881 Melbourne International Exhibition.

Her work was first exhibited in 1869 at the Otago Fine Arts Exhibition in Dunedin. In 1885 she sent work to the Auckland Art Student's Exhibition as well as to the New Zealand Industrial Exhibit where she won first prize and a silver medal for a painted screen. She was also awarded third prize for a painted table top. In 1886 she was commended for work at the Colonial and Indian Exhibition in London and in 1888 -1889 again exhibited in Melbourne at the Centennial International Exhibition. She also organised exhibits of her own work in Nelson, Wellington, New Plymouth and Stratford in 1889 and 1890, and again in New Plymouth in 1899. In 1896 she exhibited at her studio in Nelson. In January 1906 Harris held an exhibition of between 100 and 250 works in her studio in Nile Street in Nelson during carnival week. The works were on a larger scale then her early work and were in oil, rather than watercolour.

Examples of paintings by Emily Cumming Harris

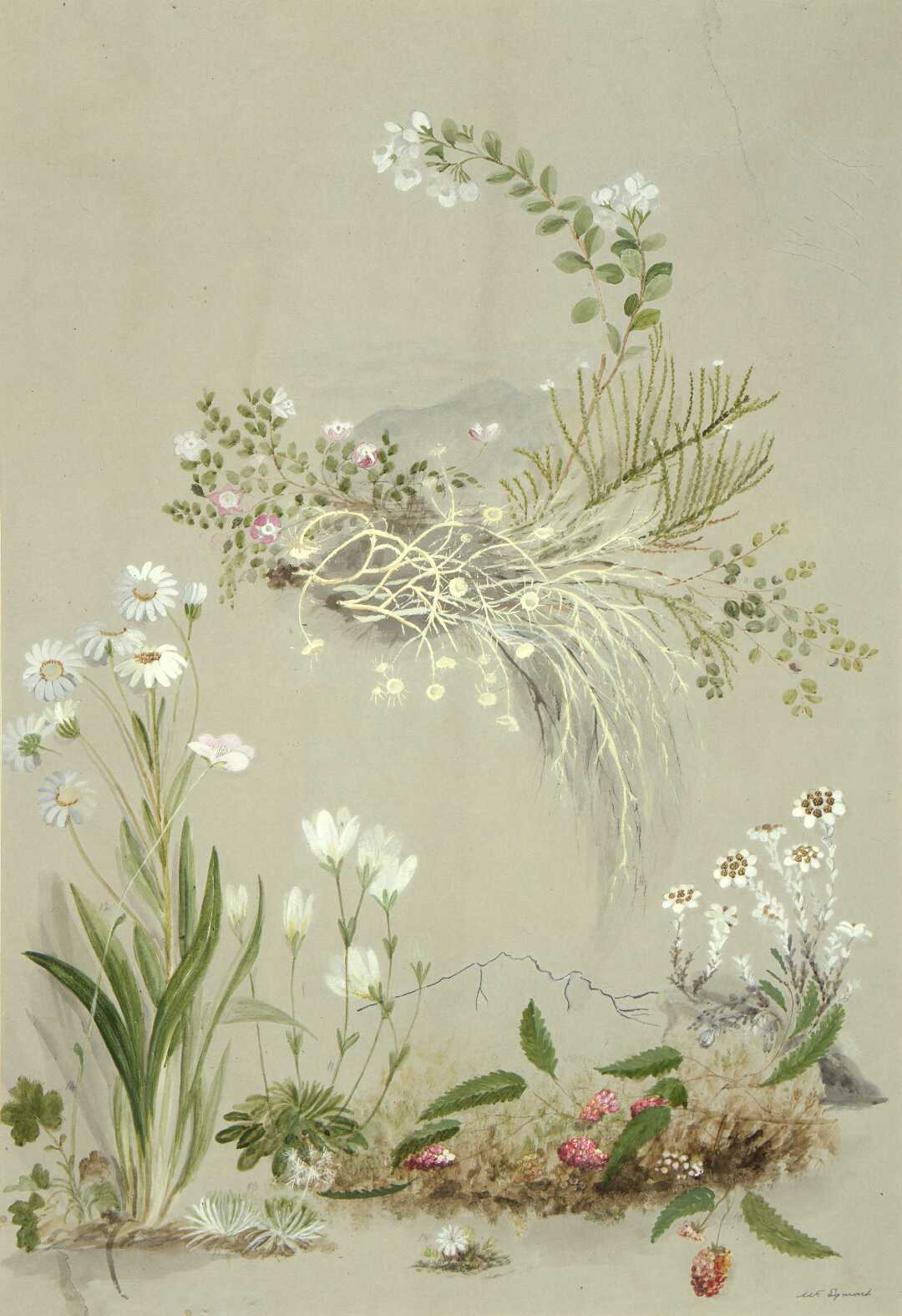
Various herbs from Mt Egmont

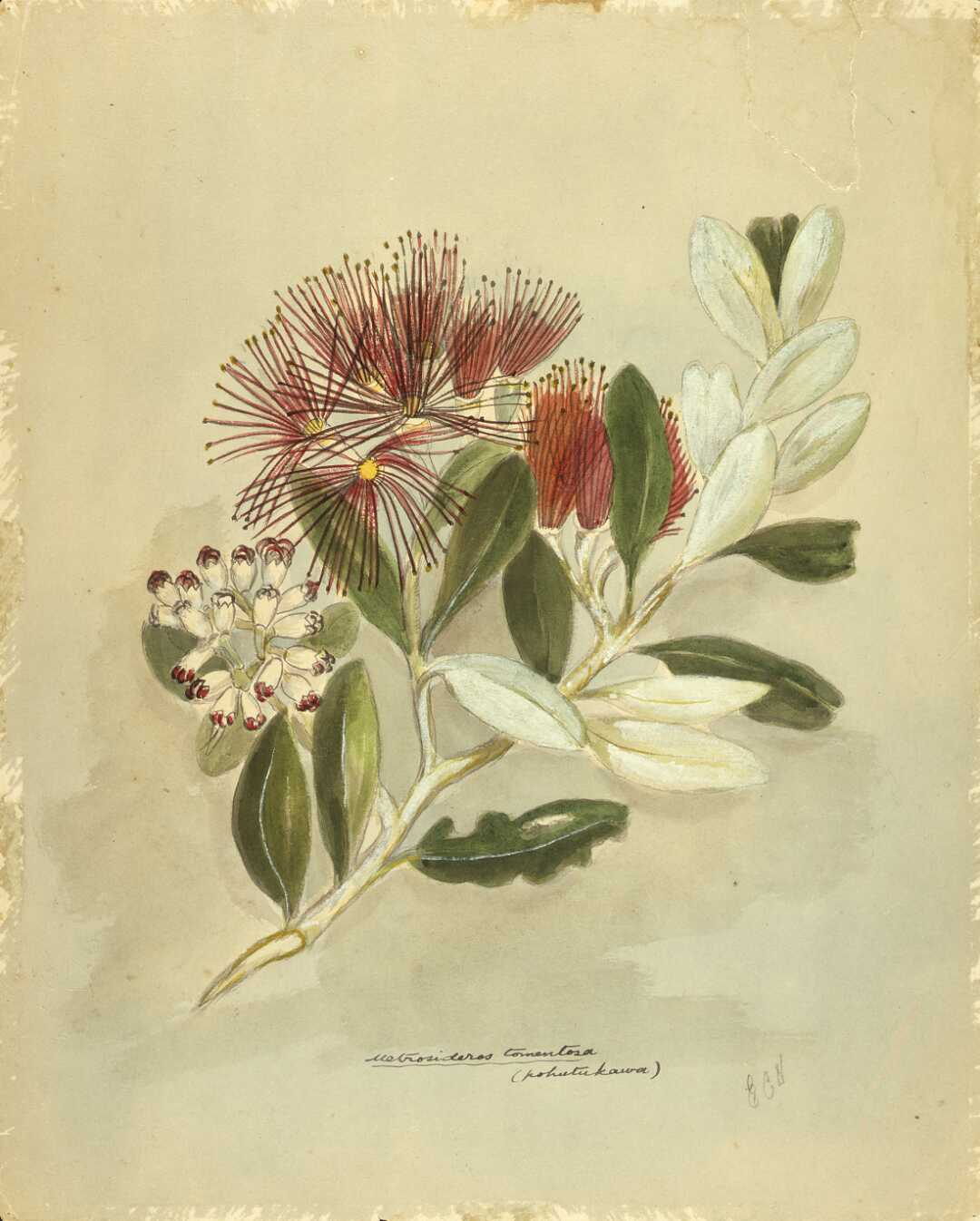
Metrosideros tomentosa (pohutukawa)

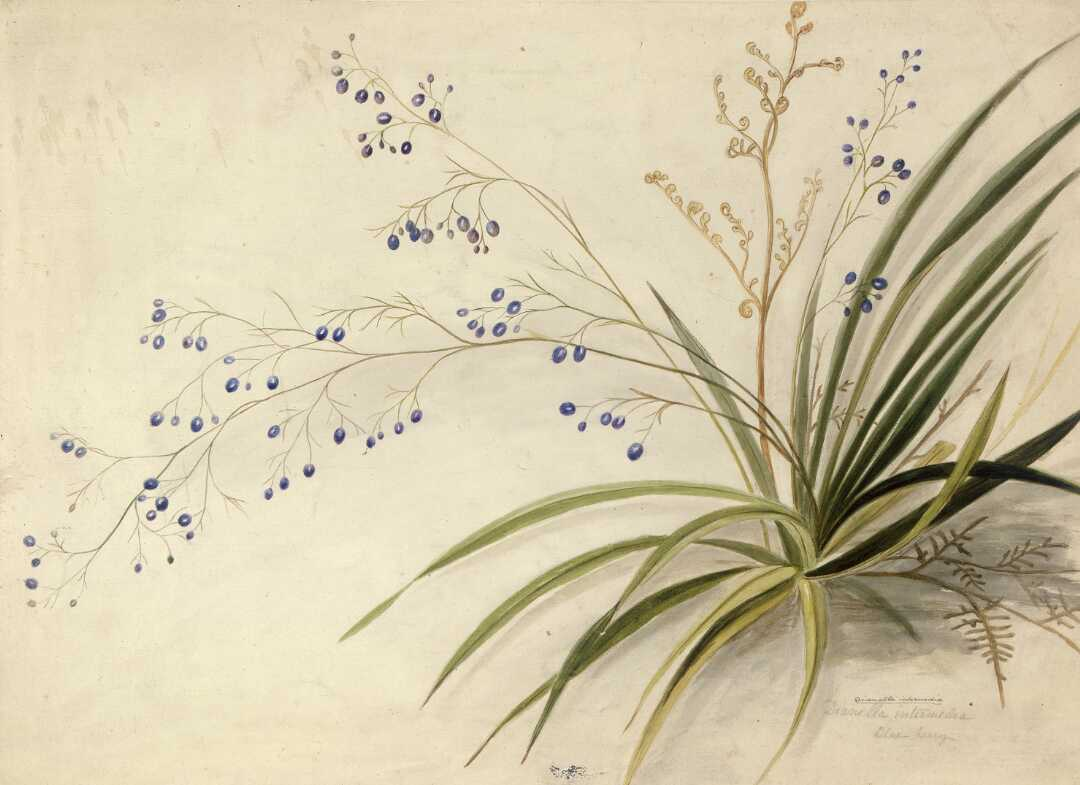
Dianella intermedia (blue berry)

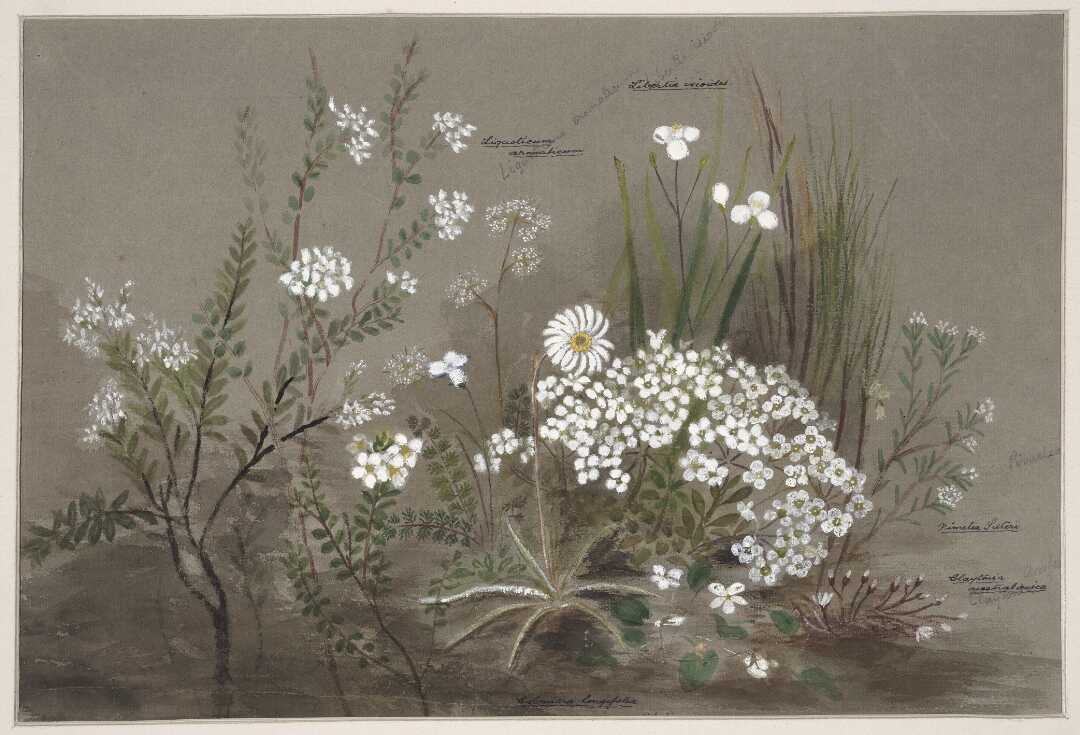

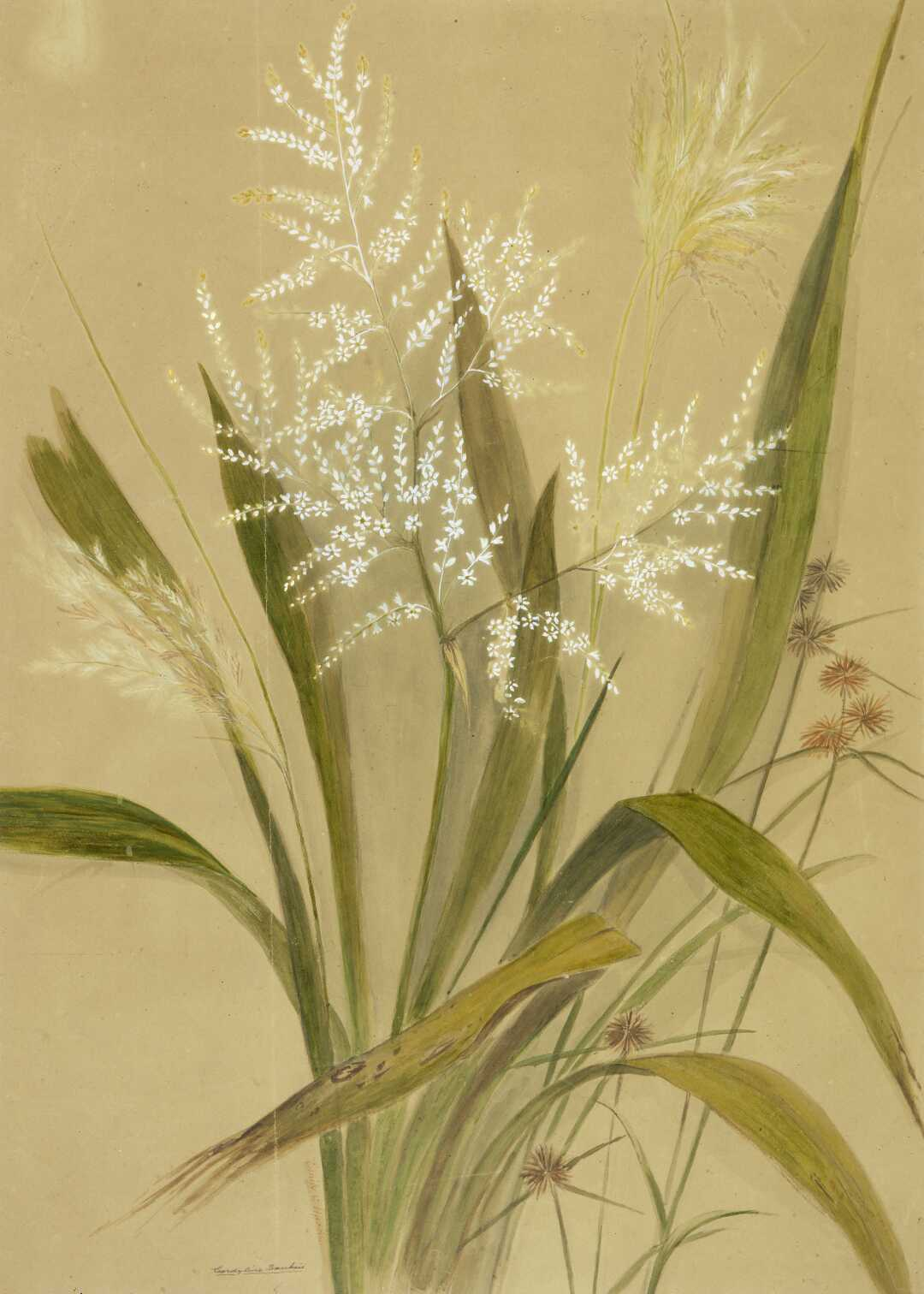
Cordyline banksii

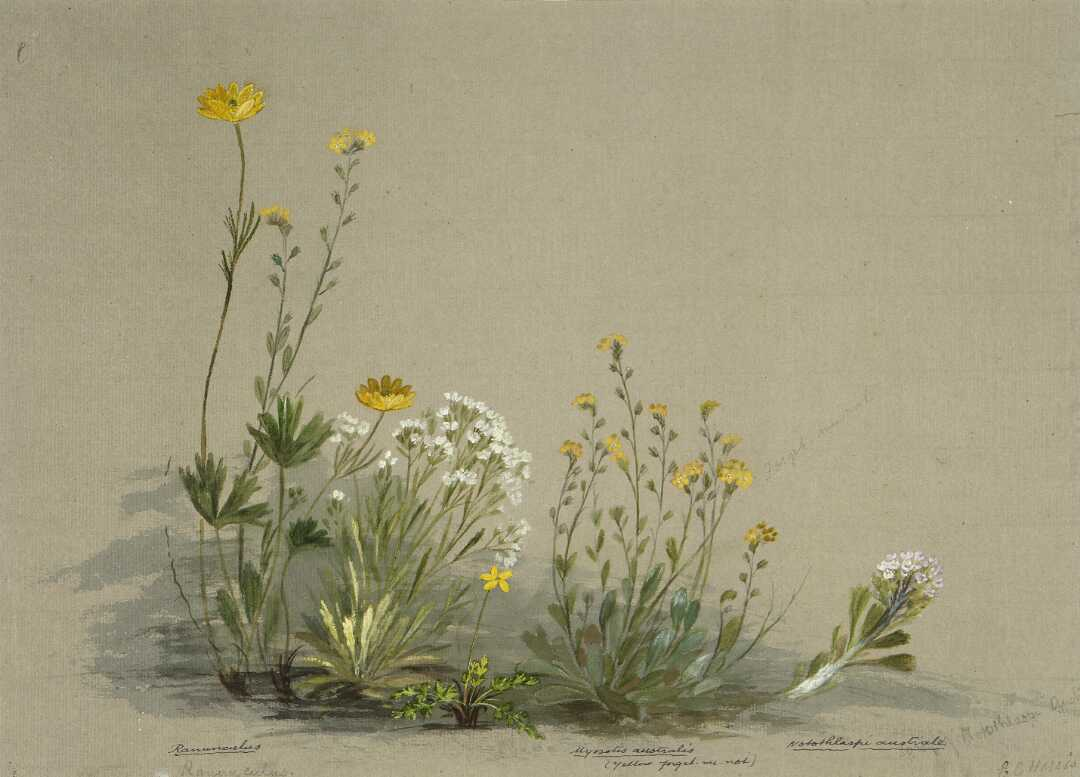
Ranunculus, myosotis australis (yellow forget-me-not)., notothlaspi australe

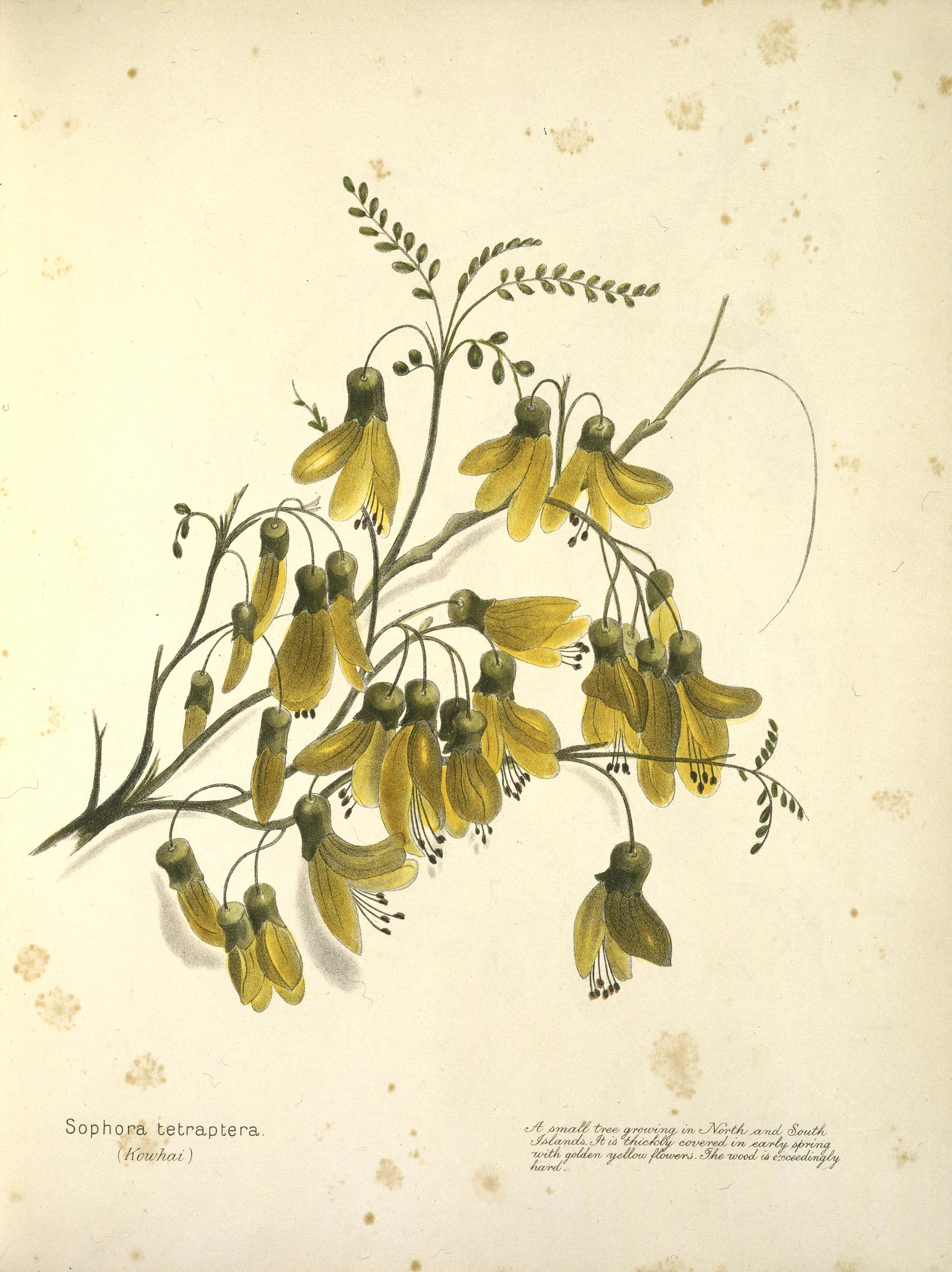
Sophora tetraptera (kowhai)

== Published work ==
Harris published three books in 1890, New Zealand Flowers, New Zealand Ferns and New Zealand Berries. These were later published in a single volume, Flowers, ferns and berries of New Zealand. In the mid 1890s Harris started selling hand-coloured sets of the books for 10 shillings per book. Copies of these hand-coloured sets are held in public collections in New Zealand, Australia, the United States, and the United Kingdom. Harris also illustrated a children's book by Sarah Moore called Fairyland in New Zealand published in 1909.

- Emily Cumming Harris (1894), New Zealand flowers., Nelson: HD Jackson, doi:10.5962/BHL.TITLE.169102, OCLC 5884225, Wikidata Q105286027
- Emily Cumming Harris (1894), New Zealand ferns, Nelson: HD Jackson, doi:10.5962/BHL.TITLE.169102, OCLC 54542186, Wikidata Q105286023
- Emily Cumming Harris (1894), New Zealand berries, Nelson: HD Jackson, OCLC 54542187, Wikidata Q105289802
- Emily Cumming Harris (1890), New Zealand flowers ; New Zealand ferns ; New Zealand berries, Nelson: HD Jackson, OCLC 1035301744, Wikidata Q105286022

== Unpublished work ==
She completed a book entitled New Zealand Mountain Flowers in the 1890s which was never published. The Alexander Turnbull Library purchased the manuscript in London in 1970. The book contains eight poems written by Harris, as well as "30 bound signatures, each featuring a watercolour of alpine flora and a facing page of typewritten text". Harris had hoped the book would be published in England by her cousin Lord Stuart Rendel and his wife Ellen, but after their deaths in 1913 and 1912 respectively, it seems the manuscript was returned to New Zealand unpublished. The Alexander Turnbull Library purchased the manuscript in their possession from collector Kenneth Athol Webster but it not known how or when it came into his possession. Some of the paintings and drawings in the Turnbull collection are of native plants based on specimens collected in 1890 by New Zealand botanists Thomas Kirk and Frederick Chapman in the New Zealand subantarctic islands during an expedition on the Hinemoa.

== Later life ==
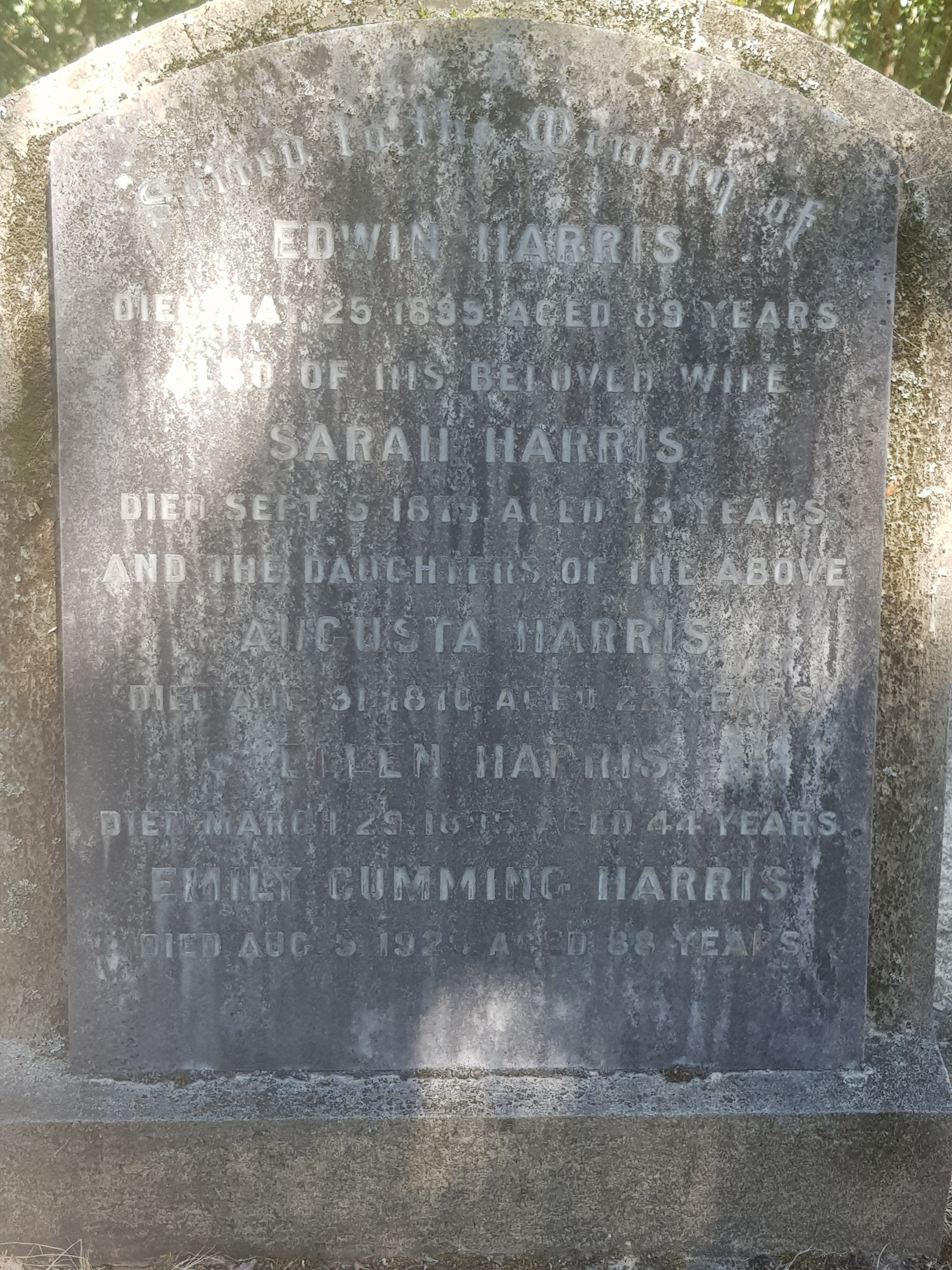
Emily Cumming Harris' grave, Wakapuaka Cemetery

Harris's professional artistic development and success was constrained by family obligations, straitened finances and the conventions of her time. However, in 1924 the Alexander Turnbull Library purchased 63 of her watercolours. Two limited edition sets of prints were issued from the collection in 1968 and 1979. She continued to live and paint in the family home at Nile Street, Nelson, until her death aged 88, on 5 August 1925. She is buried at Wakapuaka cemetery in Nelson.

In 2017, Harris was selected as one of the Royal Society Te Apārangi's "150 women in 150 words", celebrating the contributions of women to knowledge in New Zealand.
