= George Brodie (New Zealand politician) =

New Zealand politician

New Zealand Parliament
Years	Term	Electorate	Party
1863–1866	3rd	Gold Fields	Independent

George Brodie was a 19th-century Member of Parliament in Otago, New Zealand.

He represented the Gold Fields electorate from 1863 to 1866, when he retired. In December 1865, he served on the Executive Council of the Otago Province.
