= Bendix Hallenstein =

New Zealand merchant and politician (1835–1905)

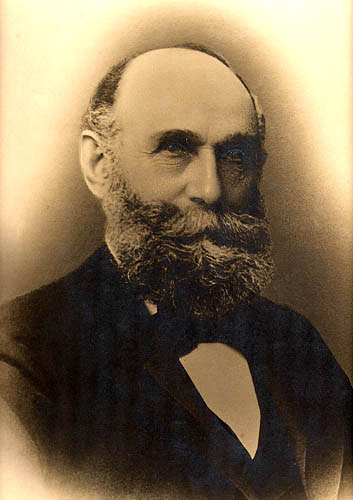
- Born: c. 24 January 1835; Bisperode, Duchy of Brunswick, Germany
- Died: 6 January 1905 (aged 69–70); Dunedin, New Zealand
- Known for: Founding Hallenstein Brothers; Founding D.I.C.
- Spouse: Mary Mountain (m. 1861)
- Relatives: Willi Fels (nephew and son-in-law); Dora de Beer (grandchild); Charles Brasch (great-grandson)

Bendix Hallenstein (c. 24 January 1835 – 6 January 1905) was a German-born merchant, statesman, and manufacturer from Dunedin, New Zealand. He is best known for founding the retail clothing store Hallensteins, which still bears his name, and is now part of the Hallensteins Glassons group. He also founded the D.I.C. department store in Dunedin in 1884.

== Biography ==
Hallenstein was born in Bisperode, Duchy of Brunswick, part of the German Confederation, on about 24 January 1835 to Jewish parents Reuben Hallenstein and Helena Michaelis; he was their third and youngest son. His parents owned a wool mill in Lügde. In 1852, at the age of 17, he moved to Manchester, England, where his maternal uncle operated a shipping office.

In 1857 he followed his brothers, Isaac and Michaelis, to Daylesford in the Victorian goldfields, Australia. Each of the three brothers wished to marry their housekeeper, Mary Mountain (1826-1907), but it was ultimately Bendix she chose to marry. They were wed in the Anglican parish church in Alford, Lincolnshire, on 14 February 1861. They had four daughters; Sara (married Willi Fels), Emily (married Isidore de Beer), Henrietta (married James Francis (Frank) Hyams; died 1895 soon after childbirth), and Agnes (married Siegfried Barden). Emily's children, included Esmond and Dora de Beer.

In 1873 he founded the New Zealand Clothing Factory in Dunedin to provide men's clothing for his stores. He opened a store in The Octagon selling clothing at wholesale price; the retail clothing chain Hallensteins still bears his name. He also founded the Drapery and General Importing Company of New Zealand Ltd, later known as the D.I.C., in 1884.

Hallenstein was the mayor of Queenstown Borough from 1869 to 1872. He represented the electorate of Wakatipu in Parliament from 1872 to 1873, when he resigned. He was appointed German consul for Dunedin in 1892.

New Zealand Parliament
| Years | Term | Electorate | Party |
|---|---|---|---|
| 1872–1873 | 5th | Wakatipu | Independent |

Hallenstein's son-in-law (and nephew) Willi Fels was a prominent philanthropist and arts collector in early Dunedin. Hallenstein's great-grandson Charles Brasch was a noted poet, literary editor and arts patron.

In 2010, Hallenstein was posthumously inducted into the New Zealand Business Hall of Fame.

New Zealand Parliament
| Preceded by Charles Edward Haughton | Member of Parliament for Wakatipu; 1872–1873 | Succeeded by Vincent Pyke |
