= James Benn Bradshaw =

New Zealand politician

James Benn Bradshaigh Bradshaw (22 September 1832 – 1 September 1886) was a 19th-century member of parliament in the Otago region of New Zealand. He also played cricket.

== Private life ==
He was born in Barton Blount, South Derbyshire, England, the son of a clergyman. He was a gold prospector and miner in Australia before becoming a bank assayer. In Otago he was also an assayer, before becoming the editor of the Lake Wakatip Mail newspaper in 1863. During his political career he worked for reform of the laws relating to gold mining and for labour law reform and small landholders. He lived in Thames in the late 1860s and in April 1870, he married Harriette Clementina Bolton at Auckland. By the following year, they were back in Dunedin.

He played cricket for Otago and competed in the 1864 game against the English team led by George Parr touring in New Zealand in 1863/64.

== Political career ==
New Zealand Parliament
Years	Term	Electorate	Party
1866–1870	4th	Gold Field Towns	Independent
1871–1875	5th	Waikaia	Independent
1884–1886	9th	Dunedin Central	Independent

He first stood for the Otago Provincial Council in 1864, but was unsuccessful. He was elected to the provincial government in the Mount Benger electorate on 23 March 1871 and served until the dissolution of the council's sixth session on 22 May 1873. He was a member of the Otago Executive Council from 2 June 1871 to 19 November 1872.

Bradshaw stood in the 1865 Gold Fields by-election as one of three candidates, but was beaten by Charles Edward Haughton. He represented the Gold Field Towns electorate from 1866 to 1870; then from 1871 the Waikaia electorate, until he retired in 1875. He then represented the Dunedin Central electorate from 1884 until he died in 1886.

== Death ==
Bradshaw died of a stroke in Dunedin on 1 September 1886. He was survived by his wife and five children, and they returned to live in England.

Several people including a group of factory operatives decided to raise money for a memorial to him, and it was said that he had not left his family well provided for.

== Sources ==
New Zealand Parliament
Preceded by Thomas Bracken	Member of Parliament for Dunedin Central; 1884–1886	Succeeded by Thomas Bracken
