= Wakatipu (electorate) =

Wakatipu was a parliamentary electorate in the Otago region of New Zealand, from 1871 to 1928.

== Population centres ==
The electorate was located in Otago and centred on Lake Wakatipu and Queenstown. Wānaka was always covered by the electorate. When the electorate was formed, it replaced the Hampden electorate (which did not, in the end, extend all the way to the east coast and thus did not include the township of Hampden itself). Through the 1927 electoral redistribution, the Wakatipu electorate was replaced by the Central Otago electorate (later renamed Otago Central).

== History ==
The Wakatipu electorate was formed for the 1871 election, which was won by Charles Haughton, who resigned late in December of that year. The resulting 1872 by-election was won by Bendix Hallenstein, who resigned again in 1873. Vincent Pyke won the 1873 by-election. He served until the end of the parliamentary term and successfully contested the 1875 election in the Dunstan electorate.

Pyke was succeeded by Henry Manders in the 1876 election. At the next election in 1879, Manders was defeated by Hugh Finn, who in turn retired in 1881.

Finn was succeeded by Thomas Fergus, who served the electorate for four parliamentary terms from 1881 to 1893, when he retired. The 1893 election was won by William Fraser, who represented the electorate until his retirement in 1919, after which he was appointed to the Legislative Council. Fraser joined the Reform Party when it formed in 1909.

Fraser was succeeded by James Horn representing the Liberal Party from 1919 election to 1928, when the electorate was abolished.

=== Members of Parliament ===
Key

Independent Conservative Reform Liberal

Election	Winner
1871 election	Charles Haughton
1872 by-election	Bendix Hallenstein
1873 by-election	Vincent Pyke
1876 election	Henry Manders
1879 election	Hugh Finn
1881 election	Thomas Fergus
1884 election	Thomas Fergus
1887 election	Thomas Fergus
1890 election	Thomas Fergus
1893 election	William Fraser
1896 election	William Fraser
1899 election	William Fraser
1902 election	William Fraser
1905 election	William Fraser
1908 election	William Fraser
1911 election	William Fraser
1914 election	William Fraser
1919 election	James Horn
1922 election	James Horn
1925 election	James Horn
(Electorate abolished 1928; see Central Otago)

== Election results ==
=== 1899 election ===
1899 general election: Wakatipu
Party	Candidate	Votes	%	±%
Conservative	William Fraser	1,895	52.33	
Liberal	James Kelly (Note: Not to be confused with James Whyte Kelly, who was defeated in the 1899 election in the Invercargill electorate)	1,726	47.67	
Majority		169	4.67	
Turnout		3,621	75.99	
Registered electors		4,765		

Table footnotes:

=== 1873 by-election ===
1873 Wakatipu by-election
Party	Candidate	Votes	%	±%
Independent	Vincent Pyke	226	38.18	
Independent	Henry Manders	192	32.43	
Independent	Alexander Innes	174	29.39	
Independent	George Elliott Barton	101	17.06	
Majority		34	5.74	
Turnout		196		

=== 1872 by-election ===
1872 Wakatipu by-election
Party	Candidate	Votes	%	±%
Independent	Bendix Hallenstein	432	63.53	
Independent	James Macassey	220	22.35	
Independent	J. Miller	28	4.12	
Turnout		537		
Majority		151	28.12	
