= Andrew Buchanan (New Zealand politician) =

New Zealand politician

Andrew Buchanan (10 December 1807 – 4 September 1877) was a member of the New Zealand Legislative Council from 24 July 1862 to 30 June 1874, when he resigned.

== Early life ==
Buchanan was born at Heathfield, St. Anns, Jamaica on 10 December 1807, the fourth son (and eighth child) of George Buchanan (1758–1826) a Scots-born sugar planter and Jane Gowie (1777–1815) daughter of a Scottish St. Kitts planter.

In 1816, following the death of his mother, he returned to Great Britain with the remainder of his family and settled at Sherborne, Dorset. He completed his education in Sherborne before travelling to Paris to study medicine.

Whilst in Paris he became embroiled in the 1830 Polish uprising against the Russians (the November Uprising or Cadet War q.v.) and, finding his sympathies lay with the Poles, joined the Polish Army as a surgeon, remaining with them until the Russians finally put down the uprising in 1831.

== Life in New Zealand ==
Initially the Buchanan family settled in Auckland, buying land and constructing a house "Clavernok". In 1860, however, hearing that there was good land available in Otago, Buchanan travelled to Dunedin and rode into the interior, eventually buying a property called Patearoa which he then operated as a sheep station. The station covered some 30,000 ha. (75,000 acres).

The remainder of the family joined him at Dunedin in 1862 where he constructed a house, called Chingford after their former home in England.

Eschewing his profession (other than to attend emergencies) Buchanan appears to have concentrated on farming, expanding Chingford in 1863 to 21 acres and regularly travelling to his sheep station.

== Political life ==
Buchanan was nominated to the Legislative Council by Governor Gore Brown in 1861 and he took his seat in 1862. Over the ensuing 12 years he was active in many issues but gained particular attention for his concern for the conditions of mental hospitals and is credited with developing "the humane method" in New Zealand.

== Return to England and death ==
In 1873 Buchanan left New Zealand for England, travelling via Hawaii. He went to live in Sherborne, Dorset where he died on 4 September 1877 (some accounts give Dijon, France as place of death).

His eldest daughter Emma, who married Humphrey Stanley Herbert Jones, was a noted botanist, author and artist. His daughter Janet married William Baldwin.
