= William Baldwin (New Zealand politician) =

New Zealand politician

- Born: John Baldwin; 1836
- Died: 30 July 1917 (aged 82); Perth, Western Australia
- Occupations: Member of Parliament, editor, accountant
- Relatives: Andrew Buchanan (father-in-law)

William Baldwin, born John Baldwin (1836 – 30 July 1917), was a 19th-century Member of Parliament in the Otago region of New Zealand.

== Early life ==
Baldwin was born in late 1836, and baptised on 7 January 1837. He was born John Baldwin, the son of Henry Baldwin of Bandon, County Cork, Ireland, and later changed his given name to William. He served in the 19th Regiment and saw action in the Indian Rebellion of 1857.

== Life in New Zealand ==
New Zealand Parliament
Years	Term	Electorate	Party
1863–1865	3rd	Gold Fields	Independent
1866–1867	4th	Manuherikia	Independent

Baldwin settled in Otago, New Zealand, in 1860, where he purchased a sheep run at Teviot. Together with Gabriel Read, he was one of the discoverers of gold at Waitahuna. On 4 August 1863 at St Paul's Church in Dunedin, he married Janet Curling Buchanan, the daughter of Andrew Buchanan, who was a runholder at Patearoa.

Following the death of Charles Kettle, a representative of the Bruce electorate, on 5 June 1862, Baldwin was a candidate in the resulting by-election, but was beaten by Edward Cargill. Baldwin was a proponent of the separation of the South Island from the North Island.

Baldwin represented the Gold Fields electorate in the New Zealand House of Representatives from 14 April 1863 to 27 April 1865, when he resigned. On 20 June 1863, he was elected in the Gold Fields electorate of the Otago Provincial Council, which he represented until 20 September 1864. From September 1863 to April 1864, he served on the Executive Council of the province. He then represented the Manuherikia electorate in the House of Representatives from 1866 to 1867, when he resigned because he became insolvent.

Captain Baldwin was described in 1867 as "a really eccentric individual who somehow or another always resigns his seat".

In 1881, Baldwin was a parliamentary candidate for the Dunedin East electorate, but he withdrew before nomination day as he urgently needed to travel to England, but he delayed travel until February 1882.

After his time on the provincial council, he sold his sheep run and became a travelling commissioner for the Government Life Insurance Department. He established the Otago Guardian in Dunedin, the principal city of the Otago Region, in 1873 and in January 1875, he became its general manager and editor, succeeding Richard Henry Leary in the former and Vincent Pyke in the latter positions. The Guardian Company also owned the Mercurry, its weekly paper, and when Pyke left the Mercurry in November 1875, Baldwin took over the editorship of that newspaper, too. Baldwin was succeeded as manager by George Fenwick and left his editorial position in January 1876.

Baldwin was a named partner in Baldwin & Ashcroft, an accountancy and grain brokerage in Dunedin.

== Life in Western Australia ==
In the early 1890s, Baldwin visited Perth in Western Australia and was so impressed by its climate that he decided to retire to it. Although he took no further part in public life, he was one of the best-known people in Perth. He died suddenly of suspected heart failure on 30 July 1917, aged 82. He was buried at Karrakatta Cemetery. Dunedin's Baldwin Street is named after him.

== Sources ==
- Scholefield, Guy, ed. (1940). A Dictionary of New Zealand Biography : A–L (PDF). Vol. I. Wellington: Department of Internal Affairs.
- Scholefield, Guy (1950) [First published in 1913]. New Zealand Parliamentary Record, 1840–1949 (3rd ed.). Wellington: Govt. Printer.
- Wilson, Jim (1985) [First published in 1913]. New Zealand Parliamentary Record, 1840–1984 (4th ed.). Wellington: V.R. Ward, Govt. Printer. OCLC 154283103.
