= Emma Jones (naturalist) =

New Zealand author, naturalist and painter

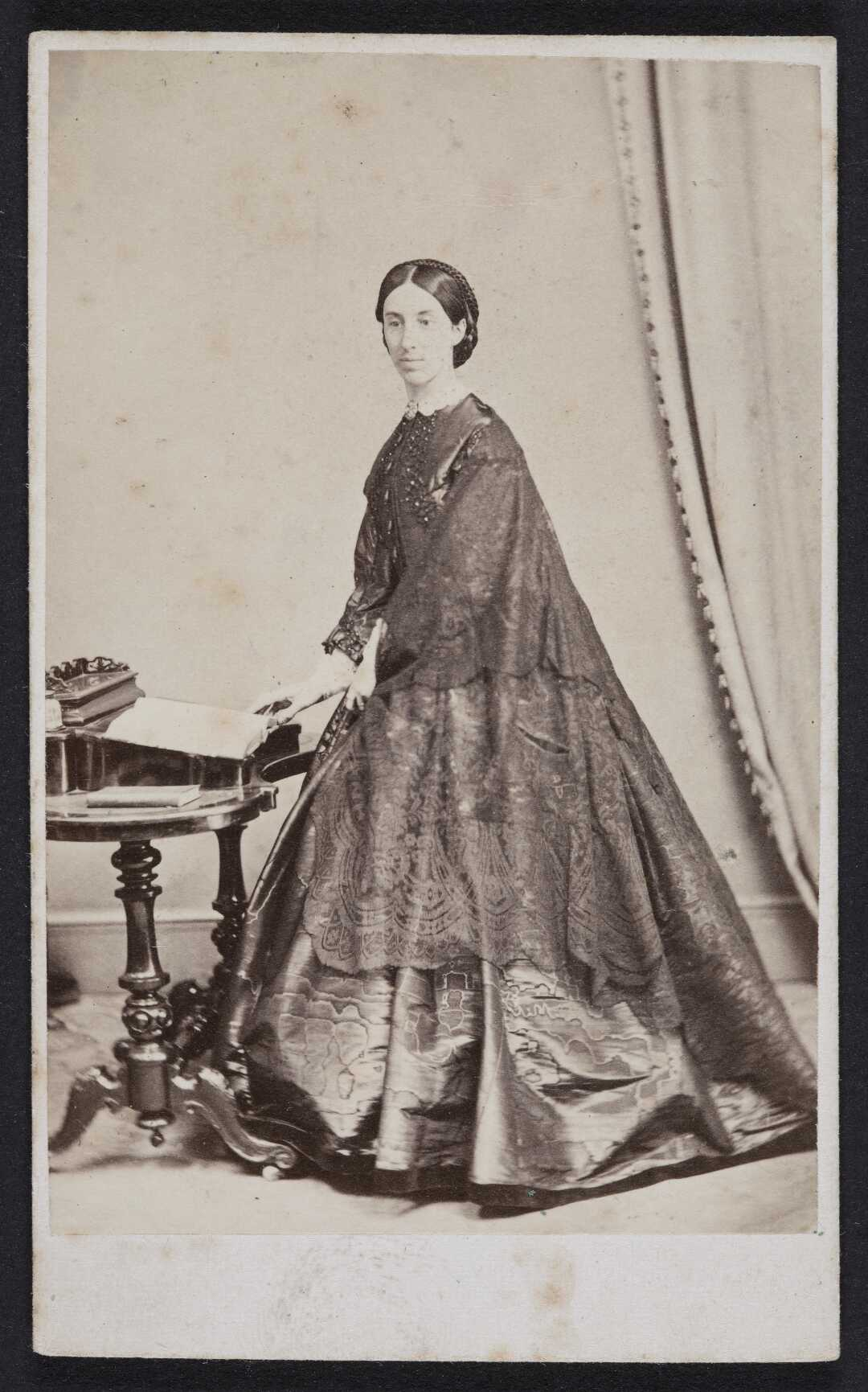
Emma Jones, date unknown

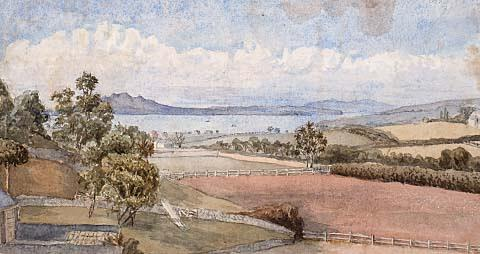
Rangitoto as painted by Emma (then named Buchanan), circa 1857. Original in the Auckland Art Gallery.

Emma Jones (née Buchanan) (1835 – after 1881) was a New Zealand author, amateur fern collector and painter. She is known for collecting a small number of fern specimens in New Zealand, which were used by Joseph Dalton Hooker in his Handbook of the New Zealand Flora.

== Biography ==
Born in Stepney in London, Emma Buchanan was the eldest daughter of Emma and Andrew Buchanan. The Buchanan family emigrated to New Zealand on the Dinapore in 1857. Also on board were a widower, Humphrey Stanley Herbert Jones (1817–1902), and his sister Elizabeth Stack. Four months after arriving in Auckland she married Jones, the commissary general of the British forces in New Zealand. They were married by Bishop George Selwyn at St Stephen's Chapel in Auckland, on 1 December 1857. In the same ceremony, Jones's sister Edith Buchanan married Alexander Clerk, Humphrey Jones's deputy in the commissariat.

Eliza Stack's journal records that almost as soon as they had arrived in New Zealand, a Dr Prendergast helped Jones to identify ferns she collected from caves at Three Kings. Stack also recounts several trips taken with Humphrey and Emma Jones around New Zealand, including collecting trips for ferns and mosses for Stack's and Jones's collections.

The Joneses built the house Clovernook in Auckland, but eventually returned to England. They did not have any children. It is not known when Emma Jones died. Humphrey Jones is recorded in the 1881 census as married and retired, staying at a hotel in Penzance. Humphrey Jones died in Italy in 1902, but his death notices do not record if Emma predeceased him, although Stack's journal mentions visiting her brother in Bordighera in 1895, without mentioning Emma.

A watercolour painting by Emma is in the Auckland City Art Gallery collection.

== Botanical contributions ==
Jones was the author of the Handbook to the Ferns of New Zealand, chiefly compiled from Dr Hooker's "Flora Novae Zelandiae", Sir Wm. J. Hooker's "Species Filicum", etc. The 32 page pamphlet was sold for two shillings and six pence to raise funds for expenses incurred in the erection of St. Mary's Church, Parnell, Auckland. The handbook was printed in 1861, and Eric Godley regarded it as the first Flora printed in New Zealand, 'holding the fort' until the printing of Hooker's Handbook of the New Zealand Flora appeared in 1864. Godley notes that although much of the material in the handbook was borrowed from Hooker, the sections which are Jones's own show her to be "no mean botanist".

Hooker's Handbook of the New Zealand Flora (1864) references the following Jones' collections: Todea africana at Hokianga; Adiantum formosum at Kaipara and Whangarei; Loxsoma cunninghamii at Waitemata; Gymnogramme leptophylla on the summit of Mount Wellington; Hypolepis distans at Manakau Heads; Loxsoma cunninghamii at Coromandel; Nephrodium molle at Rotomahana; Aspidium cystostegia, Cystopteris fragilis, Lomaria elongata, Lomaria vulcanica and Marattia salicina in the Mt Egmont Range; Hymenophyllum aeruginosum at Wellington; Lomaria vulcanica at Nelson.
