= Charles Edward Haughton =

New Zealand politician

Charles Edward (Mallard) Haughton (1827 – 16 April 1904) was a 19th-century Member of Parliament in Otago, New Zealand.

New Zealand Parliament
Years	Term	Electorate	Party
1865–1866	3rd	Goldfields	Independent
1866–1870	4th	Hampden	Independent
1871	5th	Wakatipu	Independent

He represented the Goldfields electorate from the 1865 by-election to 1866, then the Hampden electorate from 1866 to 1870, then the Wakatipu electorate in 1871, until he resigned.

He was born in New South Wales and educated at Oxford, becoming an Anglican naval chaplain (and later converted to Catholicism). He was on the Otago Provincial Council from 1865 to 1872, and then in the New Zealand Parliament he was an undersecretary and whip. He was then a journalist on the Wellington Independent, then the Dunedin Evening Star for 30 years. He died in Dunedin.

New Zealand Parliament
New constituency	Member of Parliament for Wakatipu; 1871	Succeeded by Bendix Hallenstein
