= 1st New Zealand Parliament =

First-ever parliamentary term in New Zealand

1st Parliament of New Zealand
2nd Parliament	→
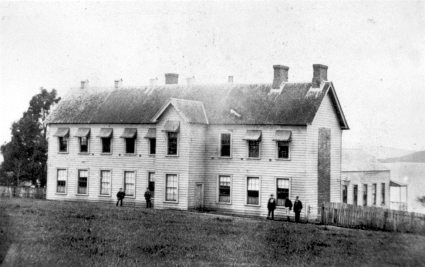
- General Assembly House

Overview
- Legislative body: New Zealand Parliament
- Term: 24 May 1854 – 15 September 1855
- Election: 1853 New Zealand general election
- Government: Fitzgerald Executive (1854); Forsaith Executive (from 1854)

House of Representatives
- Members: 37
- Speaker of the House: Sir Charles Clifford
- Leader of the Executive Delegation: Thomas Forsaith from 1854; James FitzGerald in 1854

Legislative Council
- Members: 16
- Speaker of the Council: Frederick Whitaker — William Swainson until 8 August 1855

Sovereign
- Monarch: HM Victoria
- Governor: HE Rt Hon. Colonel Thomas Browne from 6 September 1855

The 1st New Zealand Parliament was a term of the Parliament of New Zealand. It opened on 24 May 1854, following New Zealand's first general election (held the previous year). It was dissolved on 15 September 1855 in preparation for that year's election. There were 37 Members of the House of Representatives (MHRs) representing 24 electorates.

== Parliamentary sessions ==
The Parliament sat for three sessions:

Session	from	to
First	24 May 1854	17 Aug 1854
Second	31 Aug 1854	16 Sep 1854
Third	8 Aug 1855	15 Sep 1855

New Zealand had not yet obtained responsible government (that is, the power to manage its own affairs), and so the 1st Parliament did not hold any significant power.

The 1st Parliament was held before the creation of either political parties or the office of Premier. There were, however, appointments made to the Executive Council (the formal institution upon which Cabinet is based). From 14 June 1854 to 2 August 1854, there was a four-person cabinet, New Zealand's 1854 FitzGerald Ministry, led by James FitzGerald, with Henry Sewell, Frederick Weld, and Thomas Bartley (a fifth member, Dillon Bell, also joined for a short time). Then, from 31 August 1854 to 2 September 1854, there was another four-person cabinet led by Thomas Forsaith, with James Macandrew, William Travers, and Jerningham Wakefield. Some historians consider FitzGerald and Forsaith to be New Zealand's first Prime Ministers, but neither held any formal leadership role and since "responsible government" had not yet been obtained, they had little real power. Henry Sewell, appointed shortly after the 2nd New Zealand Parliament opened, is more often considered to have been the first Prime Minister.

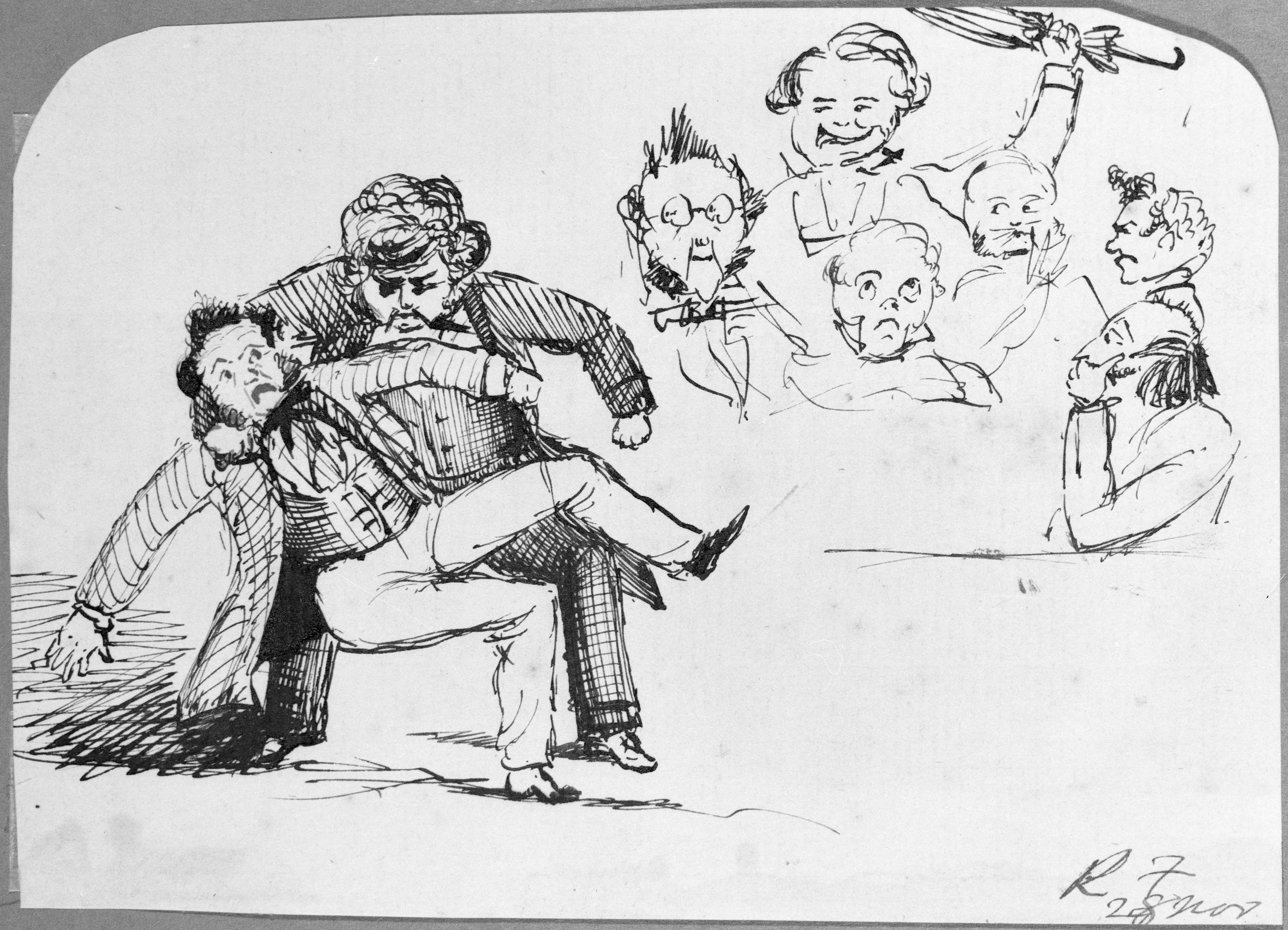
Sewell overwhelming Mackay, with Fitzherbert (hand covering mouth) looking on

On 17 August 1854 when the newly convened House of Representatives met, Administrator of the Government (acting Governor) Robert Wynyard was proposing to prorogue the General Assembly as he had not received authority from London. Sewell wanted to continue the debate and the suspension of standing orders was moved. The minority "Wakefieldites" (followers of Edward Gibbon Wakefield) opposed the move and tried to leave so that there would not be two-thirds of members present. This led to a violent turn when Sewell was reported to have pounced on the member for Nelson James Mackay and seized him by the throat. Suspension was moved an hour later when some members of the absent majority returned. Mackay was later found guilty of gross and premeditated contempt. There were moves to find the member from Dunedin James Macandrew guilty of contempt for entering the house with his hat on, but this was withdrawn.

The 1st Parliament consisted of thirty-seven representatives representing twenty-four electorates. Two regions of the colony (the inland regions of the lower North Island and the northwest corner of the South Island) were not part of any electorate, and so were not represented.

== Electoral boundaries for the 1st Parliament ==
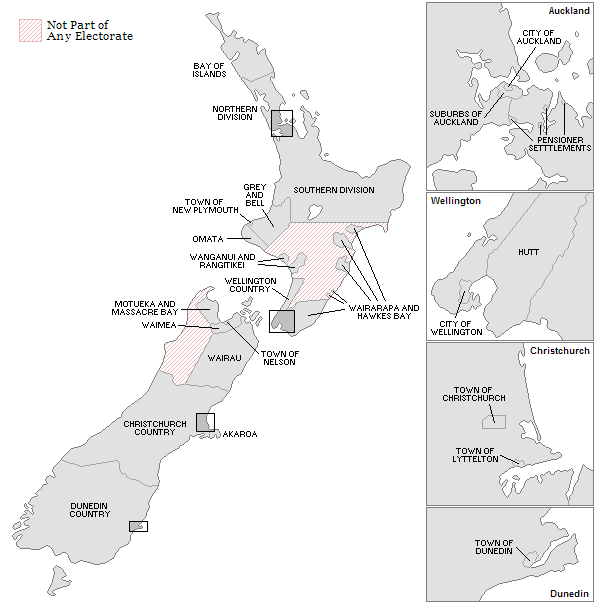

== Initial composition of the 1st Parliament ==
Member	Electorate	Province	Election date
William Moorhouse	Akaroa	Canterbury	24 August
Thomas Bartley	City of Auckland	Auckland	11 August
Loughlin O'Brien	City of Auckland	Auckland	11 August
James O'Neill	City of Auckland	Auckland	11 August
Frederick Merriman	Suburbs of Auckland	Auckland	10 August
William Porter	Suburbs of Auckland	Auckland	10 August
Hugh Carleton	Bay of Islands	Auckland	14 July
James Stuart-Wortley	Christchurch Country	Canterbury	27 August
Jerningham Wakefield	Christchurch Country	Canterbury	27 August
Henry Sewell	Town of Christchurch	Canterbury	20 August
John Cargill	Dunedin Country	Otago	1 October
William Cutten	Dunedin Country	Otago	1 October
James Macandrew	Town of Dunedin	Otago	27 September
Thomas King	Grey and Bell	New Plymouth	27 August
Alfred Ludlam	Hutt	Wellington	18 August
Edward Gibbon Wakefield	Hutt	Wellington	19 August
James FitzGerald	Town of Lyttelton	Canterbury	17 August
Alfred Picard	Motueka and Massacre Bay	Nelson	18 August
James Mackay	Town of Nelson	Nelson	25 July
William Travers	Town of Nelson	Nelson	25 July
Francis Gledhill	Town of New Plymouth	New Plymouth	26 August
Thomas Forsaith	Northern Division	Auckland	23 August
Walter Lee	Northern Division	Auckland	23 August
William Crompton	Omata	New Plymouth	26 August
John Bacot	Pensioner Settlements	Auckland	13 August
Joseph Greenwood	Pensioner Settlements	Auckland	13 August
Charles Taylor	Southern Division	Auckland	23 August
John Gray	Southern Division	Auckland	23 August
William Cautley	Waimea	Nelson	16 August
David Monro	Waimea	Nelson	16 August
Samuel Revans	Wairarapa and Hawke's Bay	Wellington	12 August
Frederick Weld	Wairau	Nelson	2 August
Isaac Featherston	Wanganui and Rangitikei	Wellington	12 August
Charles Clifford	City of Wellington	Wellington	15 August
Robert Hart	City of Wellington	Wellington	15 August
James Kelham	City of Wellington	Wellington	15 August
William Rhodes	Wellington Country	Wellington	18 August

== Changes during term ==
There were few changes during the term of the 1st Parliament, with only three by-elections being held. There were six resignations and one death during 1855, and those seats remained vacant for the remainder of the term.

By-election	Electorate	Date	Incumbent	Reason	Winner
1854	Town of Nelson	19 June	William Travers	Resignation	Samuel Stephens
1854	Waimea	21 June	William Cautley	Resignation	William Travers
1854	City of Auckland	4 August	Thomas Bartley	Resignation	William Brown

Christchurch Country

Stuart-Wortley resigned on 18 July 1855. His seat remained vacant.

City of Auckland

Bartley resigned on 11 July 1854. He was replaced by William Brown, who was elected on 4 August 1854.

City of Wellington

Kelham resigned on 3 August 1855. His seat remained vacant.

Dunedin Country

Cutten resigned on 23 July 1855. His seat remained vacant.

Hutt

Ludlam resigned on 9 July 1855. His seat remained vacant.

Town of Nelson & Waimea

Cautley, MP for Waimea, and Travers, MP for Town of Nelson, both resigned on 26 May 1854. Travers subsequently contested the Waimea seat that Cautley had vacated, being elected on 21 June. Travers' own Nelson seat was won by Samuel Stephens on 19 June. Stephens died on 26 June 1855. His seat remained vacant.

Wairau

Weld resigned on 13 June 1855. His seat remained vacant.

Wanganui and Rangitikei

Featherston resigned on 9 August 1855. His seat remained vacant.
