= 1853 New Zealand provincial elections =

New Zealand's Provinces in 1853

The 1853 New Zealand provincial elections were the first elections in New Zealand to elect members and superintendents to the newly created Provinces of New Zealand. The elections were held between July and September 1853, at the same time as the 1853 New Zealand general elections for the central government, which were held between July and October. The provincial elections had higher voter turnouts than the general elections, with the elections for provincial superintendents (where they were contested) having the highest voter turnout.

== Results ==
=== Provincial councils ===
==== Auckland ====
The Auckland Provincial Council was originally made up by 24 members from six electorates: City of Auckland (6), Suburbs of Auckland (4), Pensioner Settlements (4), Northern Division (4), Southern Division (4), and Bay of Islands (2).

Electoral district	Winner	Votes (rank)	Date
Northern Division	Allan O'Neill	208 (1)	1 August 1853
Northern Division	Patrick Dignan	204 (2)	1 August 1853
Northern Division	James Hill	168 (3)	1 August 1853
Northern Division	Patrick Donovan	162 (4)	1 August 1853
City of Auckland	James Thomas Boylan	575 (1)	20 July 1853
City of Auckland	Thomas Bartley	513 (2)	20 July 1853
City of Auckland	Robert Mitchell	485 (3)	20 July 1853
City of Auckland	James O'Neill	448 (4)	20 July 1853
City of Auckland	James Derrom	367 (5)	20 July 1853
City of Auckland	Andrew O'Brien	363 (6)	20 July 1853
Suburbs of Auckland	William Field Porter	86 (1)	20 July 1853
Suburbs of Auckland	William Connell	84 (2)	20 July 1853
Suburbs of Auckland	John Watson Bain	75 (3)	20 July 1853
Suburbs of Auckland	John Anderson Gilfillan	72 (4)	20 July 1853
Southern Division	Joseph Newman	244 (1)	1 August 1853
Southern Division	James Dilworth	222 (2)	1 August 1853
Southern Division	William Innes Taylor	209 (3)	1 August 1853
Southern Division	James Macky	189 (4)	1 August 1853
Pensioner Settlements	Francis Charles Lewis	342 (1)	22 July 1853
Pensioner Settlements	Joseph Brennan	296 (2)	22 July 1853
Pensioner Settlements	William Powditch	291 (3)	22 July 1853
Pensioner Settlements	John Williamson	263 (4)	22 July 1853
Bay of Islands	James Busby	unopposed	27 July 1853
Bay of Islands	George Clarke	unopposed	27 July 1853

==== New Plymouth ====
The New Plymouth Provincial Council (with the province later known as Taranaki Province) was originally made up by nine members from three electorates: Town of New Plymouth (2), Grey and Bell (4), and Omata (3).

Electoral district	Winner	Votes (rank)	Date
Town of New Plymouth	Isaac Newton Watt	71 (1)	20 August 1853
Town of New Plymouth	Samuel Vickers	61 (2)	20 August 1853
Grey and Bell	Peter Elliott	119 (1)	20 August 1853
Grey and Bell	George Cutfield	108 (2)	20 August 1853
Grey and Bell	Robert Parris	106 (3)	20 August 1853
Grey and Bell	Richard Chilman	98 (4)	20 August 1853
Omata	Thomas Good	57 (1)	20 August 1853
Omata	Richard Rundle	57 (2)	20 August 1853
Omata	George Burton	36 (3)	20 August 1853

==== Wellington ====
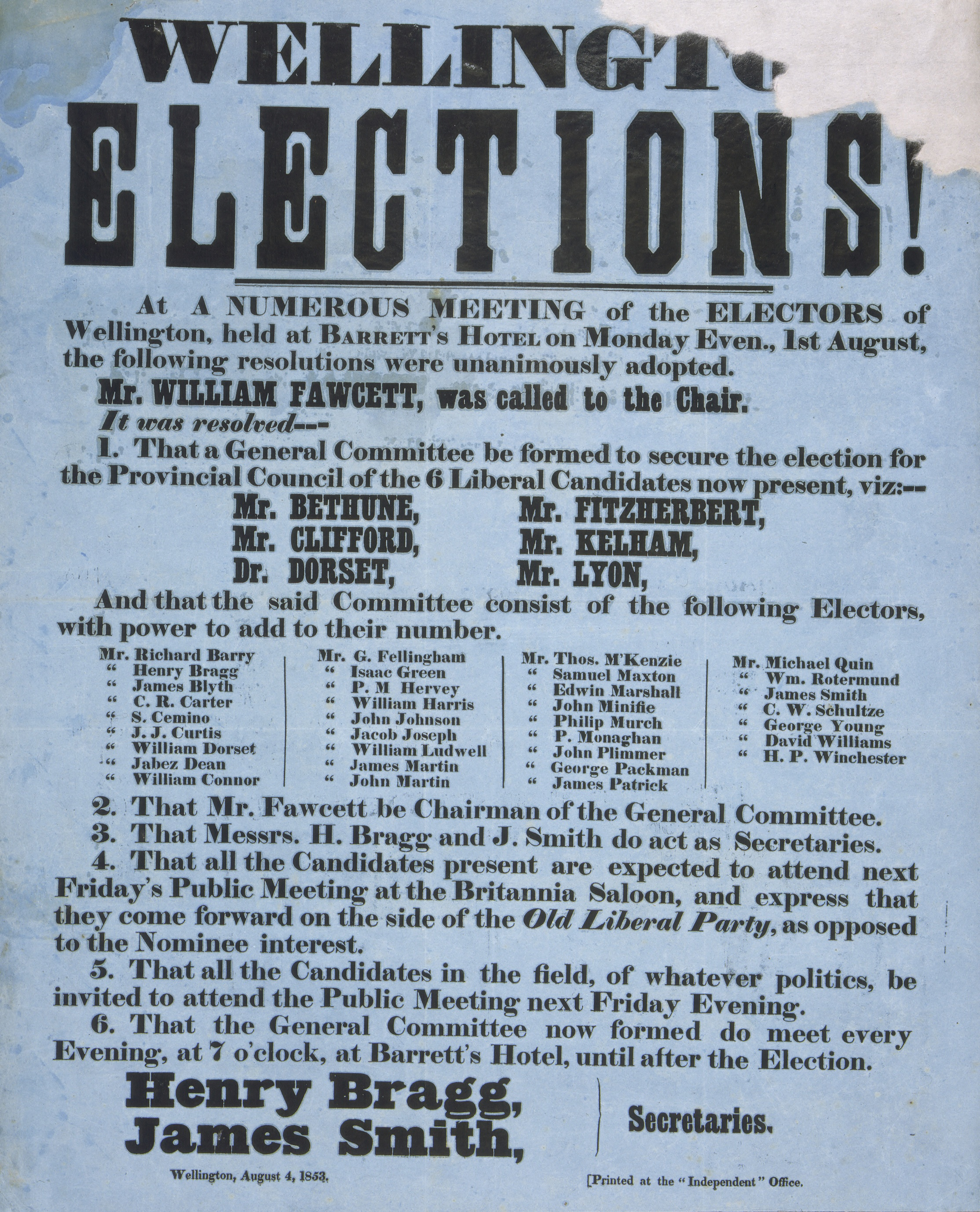
Poster for the Wellington Provincial Council elections in 1853.

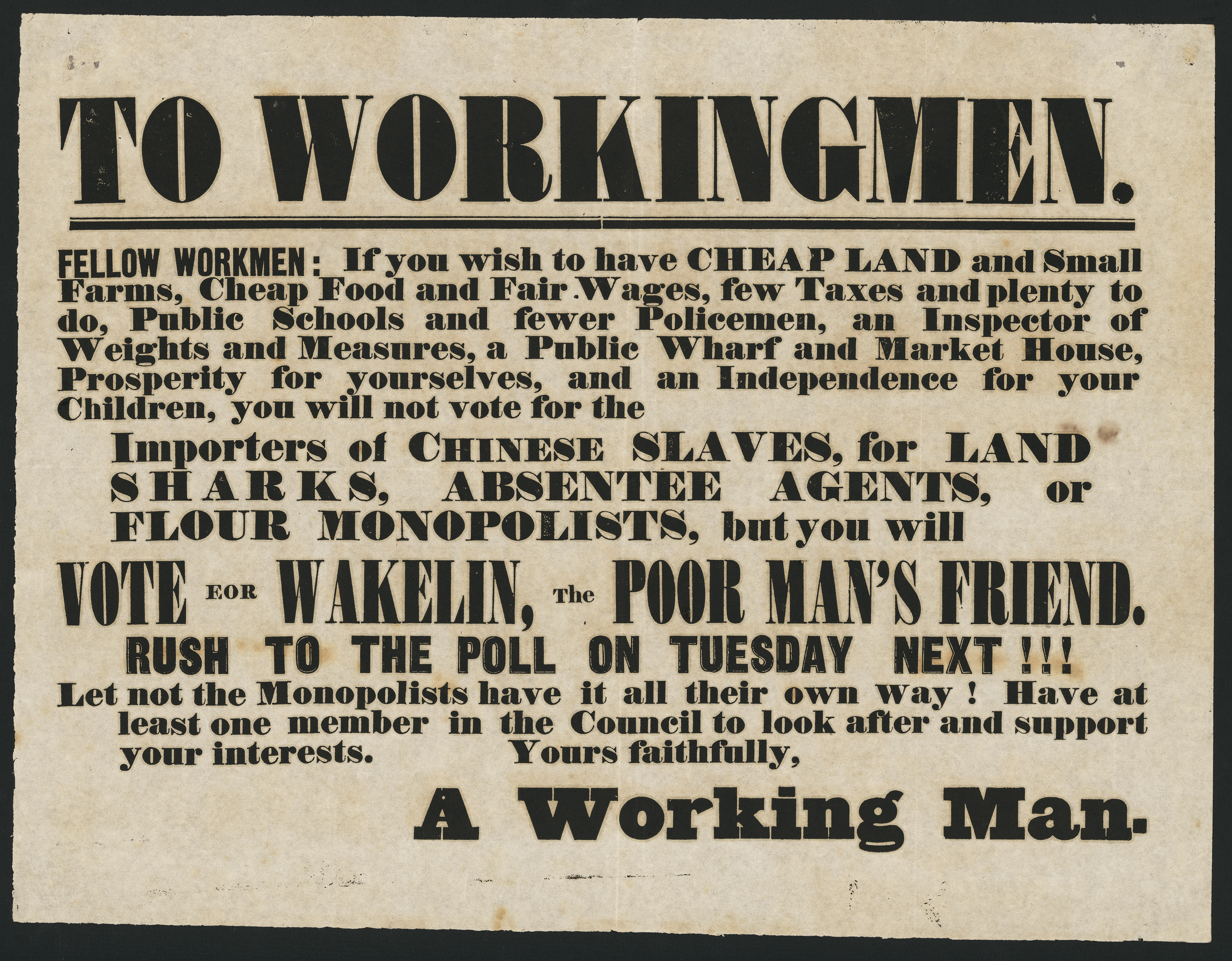
Poster for Wakelin, a populist candidate in Wellington; note the opposition to the "importers of Chinese slaves" and "flour monopolists"

The Wellington Provincial Council was originally made up by eighteen members from five electorates: City of Wellington (7), Wellington Country (3), Hutt (4), Wairarapa and Hawke's Bay (2), and Wanganui and Rangitikei (2).

Electoral district	Winner	Date
Hutt	Alfred Renall	13 August 1853
Hutt	Alfred Ludlam	13 August 1853
Hutt	Edward Gibbon Wakefield	13 August 1853
Hutt	George Hart	13 August 1853
Wanganui and Rangitikei	Henry Shafto Harrison	27 August 1853
Wanganui and Rangitikei	William Hogg Watt	27 August 1853
Wairarapa and Hawke's Bay	Samuel Revans	10 August 1853
Wairarapa and Hawke's Bay	Donald Gollan	10 August 1853
City of Wellington	Charles Clifford	9 August 1853
City of Wellington	John Dorset	9 August 1853
City of Wellington	William Fitzherbert	9 August 1853
City of Wellington	George Moore	9 August 1853
City of Wellington	John Wallace	9 August 1853
City of Wellington	William Lyon	9 August 1853
City of Wellington	Kenneth Bethune	9 August 1853
Wellington Country	Alfred Brandon	11 August 1853
Wellington Country	Robert Waitt	11 August 1853
Wellington Country	Andrew Brown	11 August 1853

==== Nelson ====
The Nelson Provincial Council was originally made up by fifteen members from seven electorates: Town of Nelson (5), Waimea East (2), Waimea South (2), Wairau (2), Motueka and Massacre Bay (2), Waimea West (1), and Suburban Districts (1).

Electoral district	Winner	Votes (rank)	Date
Town of Nelson	Donald Sinclair	161 (1)	10 August 1853
Town of Nelson	Thomas Renwick	160 (2)	10 August 1853
Town of Nelson	William Hough	132 (3)	10 August 1853
Town of Nelson	George Frederick Bush	114 (4)	10 August 1853
Town of Nelson	Henry Adams	110 (5)	10 August 1853
Waimea East	Francis Otterson	unopposed	2 August 1853
Waimea East	John Barnicoat	unopposed	2 August 1853
Waimea South	Edward Baigent	72 (1)	18 August 1853
Waimea South	John Saxton	35 (2)	18 August 1853
Wairau	Charles Elliott	unopposed	10 August 1853
Wairau	Joseph Ward	unopposed	10 August 1853
Motueka and Massacre Bay	Samuel Stephens	48 (1)	19 August 1853
Motueka and Massacre Bay	Charles Parker	36 (2)	19 August 1853
Waimea West	David Monro	unopposed	3 August 1853
Suburban Districts	James Mackay	unopposed	10 August 1853

==== Canterbury ====
The Canterbury Provincial Council was originally made up by twelve members from four electorates: Town of Christchurch (3), Christchurch Country District (4), Town of Lyttelton (3), and Akaroa (2). In Akaroa, there was a draw for second place between Rev. William Aylmer and William Sefton Moorhouse. The returning officer gave his vote to Aylmer; Moorhouse had a week earlier been elected to the House of Representatives beating Rhodes.

Electoral district	Winner	Votes (rank)	Date
Town of Christchurch	Thomas Cass	77 (1)	3 September 1853
Town of Christchurch	Samuel Bealey	74 (2)	3 September 1853
Town of Christchurch	Richard Packer	71 (3)	3 September 1853
Christchurch Country	Charles Simeon	158 (1)	10 September 1853
Christchurch Country	Henry Tancred	154 (2)	10 September 1853
Christchurch Country	John Hall	151 (3)	10 September 1853
Christchurch Country	Charles Bowen	132 (4)	10 September 1853
Town of Lyttelton	Isaac Cookson	66 (1)	31 August 1853
Town of Lyttelton	William John Warburton Hamilton	64 (2)	31 August 1853
Town of Lyttelton	Christopher Edward Dampier	60 (3)	31 August 1853
Akaroa	Robert Heaton Rhodes	27 (1)	31 August 1853
Akaroa	Rev. William Aylmer	24 (2)	31 August 1853

==== Otago ====
The Otago Provincial Council was originally made up by nine members from two electorates: Town of Dunedin (3) and Dunedin Country District (6).

Electoral district	Winner	Votes (rank)	Date
Town of Dunedin	William Cutten	54 (1)	20 September 1853
Town of Dunedin	James Adam	50 (2)	20 September 1853
Town of Dunedin	Alexander Rennie	39 (3)	20 September 1853
Dunedin Country District	John Hyde Harris	146 (1)	28 September 1853
Dunedin Country District	James Macandrew	118 (2)	28 September 1853
Dunedin Country District	William Reynolds	114 (3)	28 September 1853
Dunedin Country District	John Gillies	111 (4)	28 September 1853
Dunedin Country District	Archibald Anderson	97 (5)	28 September 1853
Dunedin Country District	Edward McGlashan	94 (6)	28 September 1853

=== Superintendent elections ===
Province	Election date	Incumbent	Winner	Runner-up	Third place	Date sworn in
Auckland	30 June 1853	Office established	Robert Wynyard	William Brown	None	12 July 1853
New Plymouth	16 July 1853	Office established	Charles Brown	William Halse	John T. Wicksteed	16 July 1853
Wellington		Office established	Isaac Featherston	Elected unopposed		2 July 1853
Nelson		Office established	Edward Stafford	John Saxton	Francis Jollie	1 August 1853
Canterbury		Office established	James FitzGerald	James Campbell	Henry Tancred	20 July 1853
Otago		Office established	William Cargill	Elected unopposed		26 December 1853
