= John Gray (New Zealand politician) =

New Zealand politician (1801–1859)

Member of the New Zealand Parliament for Southern Division
- In office 1853–1855
- Preceded by: New constituency
- Succeeded by: Charles John Taylor; Robert Graham

Personal details
- Born: 11 November 1801
- Died: 7 April 1859 (aged 57) East Tāmaki, New Zealand
- Resting place: Ōtāhuhu Anglican Cemetery
- Spouse: Barbara Gray
- Relations: George Grey (nephew)

John Gray (11 November 1801 – 7 April 1859) was a soldier and a New Zealand politician. He came to New Zealand in 1847 in charge of a section of the Royal New Zealand Fencible Corps. He successfully stood for election to the 1st New Zealand Parliament in one of the electorates where most of the population was made up by military staff, the Southern Division. He retired after one term due to ill health in 1855, and died four years later.

== Early life and family ==
Gray was born on 11 November 1801. He was the son of Owen Wynne Gray, who was commissioned as a cornet in the 6th Dragoon Guards in 1791, and his second wife, Elizabeth Philpott. His half-brother, Lieutenant-Colonel George Gray, of the 30th (Cambridgeshire) Regiment of Foot, who was killed at the Battle of Badajoz in Spain, was the father of Sir George Grey.

== Military career ==
Gray was commissioned as a captain in the 40th Regiment of Foot on 6 March 1836. He arrived in Auckland, New Zealand, on 26 November 1847 on Sir George Seymour in charge of a section of the Royal New Zealand Fencible Corps. He eventually attained the rank of lieutenant-colonel. The Lieutenant-governor of New Ulster Province, Major-General George Dean Pitt, appointed Gray as resident magistrate on 1 August 1848.

== Member of Parliament ==
New Zealand Parliament
Years	Term	Electorate	Party
1853–1855	1st	Southern Division	Independent

He served in the 1st New Zealand Parliament, representing the Southern Division, a large electorate encompassing Waikato, the Coromandel, the Bay of Plenty, and East Cape. He retired due to ill health and did not serve in any subsequent parliaments.

== Death ==
Gray died at his home, Wynnestead, East Tāmaki, on 7 April 1859, aged 57. He was buried at Ōtāhuhu Anglican Cemetery. His wife, Barbara, died on 30 July 1882 and is buried next to him.

New Zealand Parliament
New constituency	Member of Parliament for Southern Division; 1853–1855; Served alongside: Charles John Taylor	Succeeded by Charles John Taylor, Robert Graham
