= 1858 Southern Division by-election =

New Zealand by-election

The Southern Division by-election 1858 was a by-election held in the multi-member Southern Division electorate during the 2nd New Zealand Parliament, on 8 May 1858.

The by-election was caused by the resignation of incumbent MP Charles Taylor and was won by Theodore Haultain. On nomination day (28 April) Haultain and David Graham were nominated; Graham was the brother of the other member representing the electorate, Robert Graham. After a show of hands in favour of Haultain, Graham demanded a poll. Theodore Haultain was subsequently elected on 8 May.

== Results ==
1858 Southern Division by-election
| Party | Candidate | Votes | % | ±% |
|---|---|---|---|---|
| Independent | Theodore Haultain | 196 | 51.9 | |
| Independent | David Graham | 182 | 48.1 | |
| Turnout | | 378 | | |
| Majority | | 14 | 3.7 | |
