= Powditch =

Powditch is a surname. Notable people with the surname include:

- Harry Powditch (1894–1963), Australian rules footballer
- William Powditch (1795–1872), British settler and politician in New Zealand
