= 1855 New Zealand general election =

New Zealand general election held in 1855

1855 general election
- 26 October – 28 December 1855

All 37 seats in the New Zealand House of Representatives
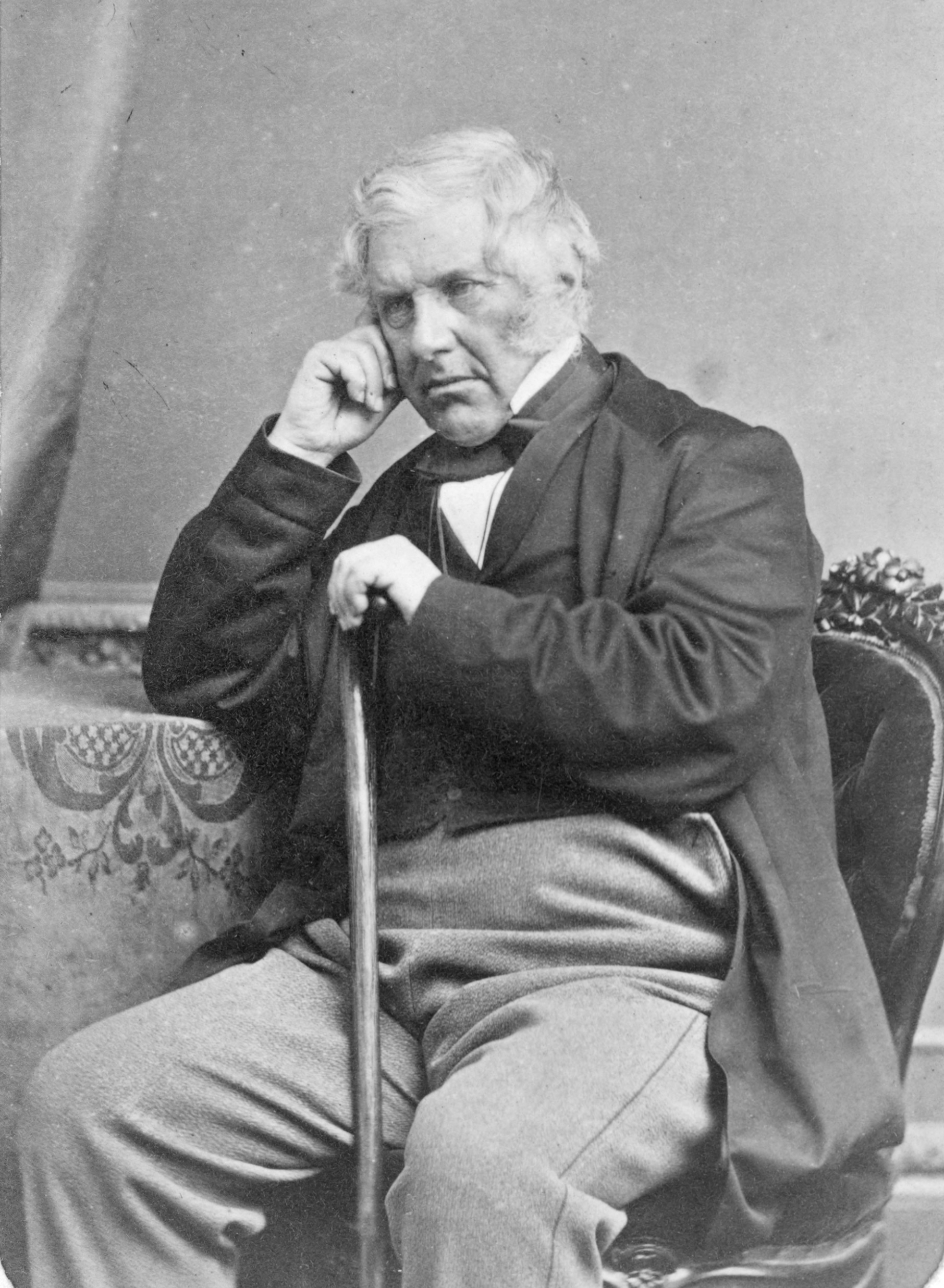
	First party
Leader	Henry Sewell
Party	Independent
Leader's seat	Town of Christchurch
Last election	37 seats
Seats won	37
Seat change	Steady
Premier before election
Office Established
Subsequent Premier
Henry Sewell
Independent

The 1855 New Zealand general election was a nationwide vote to determine the shape of the New Zealand Parliament's 2nd term. It was the second national election ever held in New Zealand, and the first one which elected a Parliament that had full authority to govern the colony.

== Background ==
The first New Zealand elections had been held after the passage of the New Zealand Constitution Act 1852 by the Parliament of the United Kingdom. The 1st Parliament did not have the ability to appoint the executive branch (Cabinet) of the New Zealand government, however, and a major dispute arose between Parliament and the Governor. In the 2nd Parliament, Parliament gained the powers it sought — for this reason, some see the 1855 elections, not the 1853 elections, as the beginning of New Zealand democracy.

At the time of the 1855 elections, there were no political parties in New Zealand. As such, all candidates were independents. Governments were formed based on loose coalitions, with prospective Prime Ministers needing to seek support from enough individual MPs to command a majority. This means that nobody could truly be said to have "won" an election — a government usually rose or fell based on its ability to make deals with MPs, not on election results.

== The election ==
In the 1855 elections, voting occurred on a different day for each individual seat. The first seat was elected on 26 October, and the final seat was elected on 28 December. An estimated 9,891 people were eligible to vote, although records are poor for some areas. The number of electoral districts was 24, with some districts electing multiple MPs. The total number of seats was 37. Some parts of the colony were not part of any district, and did not have representation in Parliament.

== Results ==
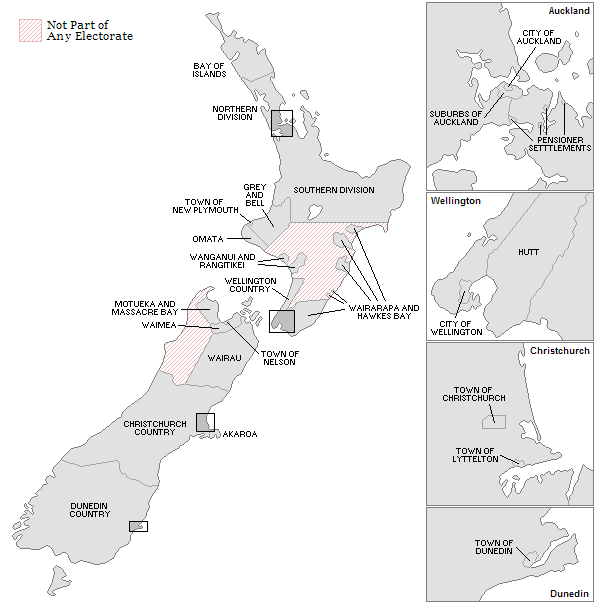

Member	Electorate	Province	MP's term	Election date
John Cuff	Akaroa	Canterbury	First	28 December
John Logan Campbell	City of Auckland	Auckland	First	27 October
Thomas Beckham	City of Auckland	Auckland	First	27 October
William Daldy	City of Auckland	Auckland	First	27 October
Frederick Merriman	Auckland Suburbs	Auckland	Second	27 October
Walter Brodie	Auckland Suburbs	Auckland	First	27 October
Hugh Carleton	Bay of Islands	Auckland	Second	24 November
Dingley Brittin	Christchurch Country	Canterbury	First	20 December
John Hall	Christchurch Country	Canterbury	First	20 December
Henry Sewell	Town of Christchurch	Canterbury	Second	18 December
John Cargill	Dunedin Country	Otago	Second	11 December
William Cargill	Dunedin Country	Otago	First	11 December
James Macandrew	Town of Dunedin	Otago	Second	11 December
Charles Brown	Grey and Bell	New Plymouth	First	8 November
Alfred Ludlam	Hutt	Wellington	Second	16 November
Dillon Bell	Hutt	Wellington	First	16 November
James FitzGerald	Town of Lyttelton	Canterbury	Second	21 December
Charles Parker	Motueka and Massacre Bay	Nelson	First	8 November
Alfred Domett	Town of Nelson	Nelson	First	12 November
Edward Stafford	Town of Nelson	Nelson	First	12 November
William Richmond	Town of New Plymouth	New Plymouth	First	5 November
Thomas Henderson	Northern Division	Auckland	First	27 October
Walter Lee	Northern Division	Auckland	Second	27 October
Alfred East	Omata	New Plymouth	First	10 November
John Williamson	Pensioner Settlements	Auckland	First	27 October
Joseph Greenwood	Pensioner Settlements	Auckland	Second	27 October
Charles Taylor	Southern Division	Auckland	Second	26 October
Robert Graham	Southern Division	Auckland	First	26 October
Charles Elliott	Waimea	Nelson	First	5 November
William Travers	Waimea	Nelson	Second	5 November
John Smith	Wairarapa and Hawke's Bay	Wellington	First	26 November
William Wells	Wairau	Nelson	First	19 November
William Fox	Wanganui and Rangitikei	Wellington	First	27 November
Charles Clifford	City of Wellington	Wellington	Second	13 November
Isaac Featherston	City of Wellington	Wellington	Second	13 November
William Fitzherbert	City of Wellington	Wellington	First	13 November
Dudley Ward	Wellington Country	Wellington	First	15 November
