= 1854 FitzGerald ministry =

- Cabinet of New Zealand
- 14 June–2 August 1854
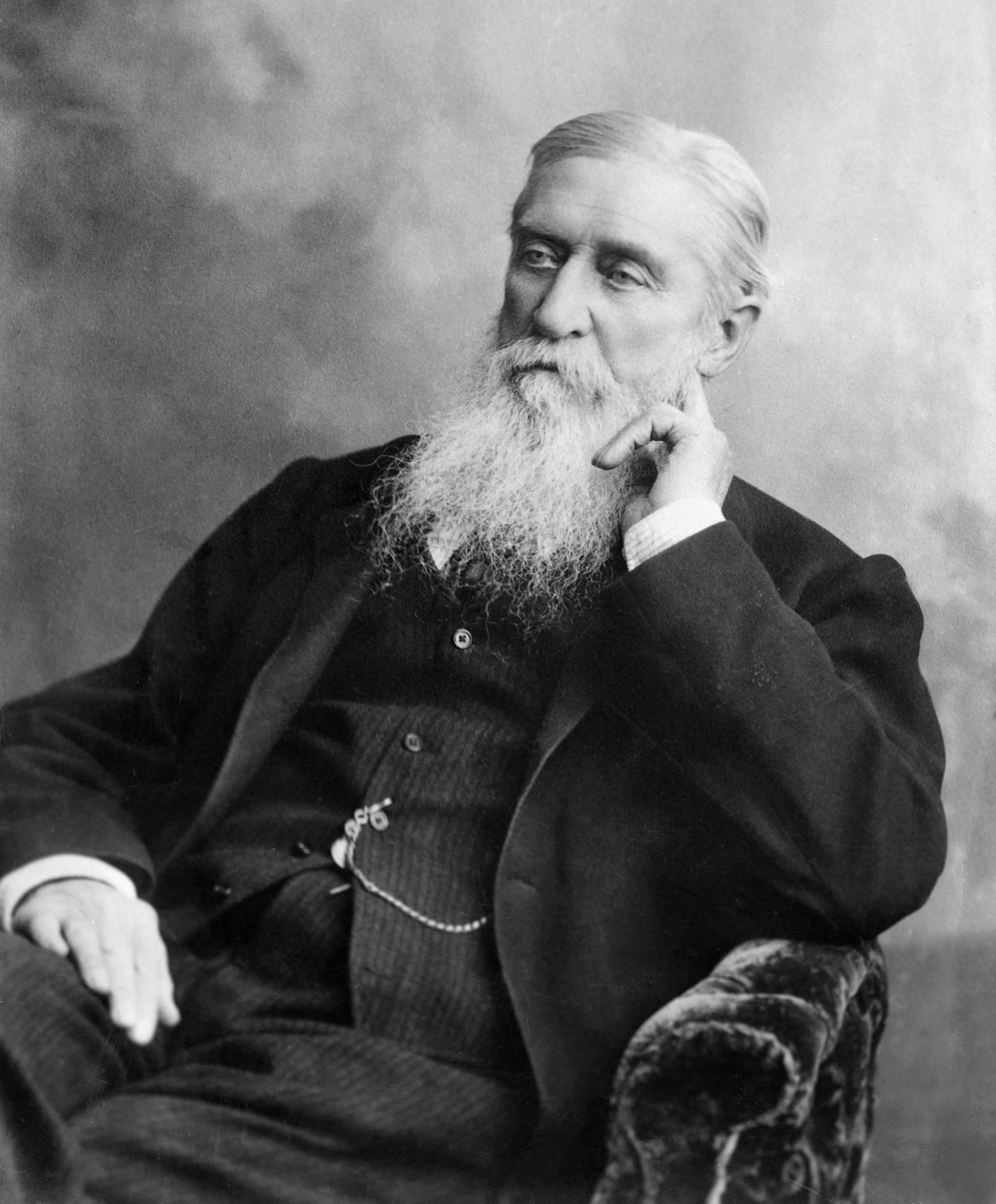
- Date formed: 14 June 1854
- Date dissolved: 2 August 1854

People and organisations
- Governor: Robert Wynyard
- Unofficial Leader: James FitzGerald
- Total no. of members: 4 (later 5)
- Member party: Independent politicians
- Status in legislature: Unofficial advisory council

History
- Outgoing election: 1853 general election
- Legislature term: 1st New Zealand Parliament
- Incoming formation: Appointment of unofficial members to Executive Council
- Outgoing formation: Resignation after Governor awaited London instructions
- Successor: Sewell Ministry

The FitzGerald Ministry was a ministry-style executive council formed in New Zealand in 1854 during the 1st New Zealand Parliament. Led by James FitzGerald, it originally consisted of four members, and was later joined briefly by Dillon Bell on 30 June 1854 following demands from the Legislative Council. As New Zealand had not yet gained responsible government, the members of the ministry were appointed by Governor Thomas Gore Browne. Although it lacked executive authority, and answered to the Governor rather than Parliament, it is typically regarded as the first attempt at a parliamentary ministry.

== Background ==
The New Zealand Constitution Act 1852 granted self-governance to the New Zealand colony and allowed the creation of an elected representative government. This was followed by the 1853 New Zealand general election, in which 37 independent politicians were elected to serve in the 1st Parliament.

Following the election, the provincial councils commenced their functions ahead of the General Assembly, creating an early context in which local governments were experimenting with responsible government at the provincial level before the national legislature was fully established. FitzGerald, Superintendent of Canterbury, created a local executive council to advise him, and if his advisors did not have majority support from the council, he would replace them with councillors who could. Isaac Featherston, Superintendent of Wellington, chose his chief executive officers from the provincial councillors, who would require council approval to remain in office.

== FitzGerald Ministry ==
The experiments with responsible government at the local level set a precedent for the national Parliament. When the first Parliament convened in 1854, elected members wished to establish a similar system at the national level, calling for ministers who would be drawn from Parliament and accountable to it rather than solely to the Governor.

In response, James FitzGerald led a group of three other members of the House of Representatives to join the Executive Council as unofficial members. The members of the ministry were appointed by the acting Governor, Robert Wynyard. The original group consisted of FitzGerald, Henry Sewell, Frederick Weld, and Thomas Bartley, and was briefly joined by Dillon Bell on 30 June 1854, until 11 July.

The FitzGerald Ministry resigned on 2 August 1854 after Wynyard informed the members that he was awaiting instructions from London before any changes to the official administration could take effect.

=== Ministers ===
Portrait	Name	Official Role	Term of Office
	James FitzGerald	Superintendent of Canterbury / Unofficial Leader	14 June – 2 August 1854
	Henry Sewell	Executive Council member	14 June – 2 August 1854
	Frederick Weld	Executive Council member	14 June – 2 August 1854
	Thomas Bartley	Executive Council member	14 June – 2 August 1854
	Dillon Bell	Executive Council member	30 June – 11 July 1854
