= John Anderson Gilfillan =

New Zealand politician

John Anderson Gilfillan (19 September 1821 – 1 February 1875) was a member of the New Zealand Legislative Council.

Gilfillan was born in Torry in Torryburn, Fife, Scotland in 1821. He was educated at the Grammar School at Cullen in Banffshire. He moved to Liverpool in November 1837 to join a firm of merchants. After a year, he was promoted to the firm's head office in London. After his health deteriorated through lung disease, he moved back to Scotland in 1845. After his health did not recover, he sought advice from Sir James Clark, 1st Baronet, the Queen Victoria's physician, who recommended a change in climate and relocation to either Egypt or New Zealand. Towards the end of 1846, he left for New Zealand on the Victoria. After a short period in Wellington, he briefly returned to England for business arrangements, and then settled in Auckland, where he arrived on 17 April 1849. His brother Robert had emigrated to Auckland just before him. The brothers set themselves up as merchants and commission agents.

On 3 June 1852 at St Paul's Church, Gilfillan married Gertrude Anne Eliza Davies, the eldest daughter of colonial surgeon William Davies. They were to have five sons and three daughters.

Gilfillan was one of the original six appointees from Auckland to the Legislative Council. He was appointed on 6 May 1854 and served until 2 August 1861 when he resigned; then 12 July 1862 to 23 April 1866 when he again resigned. He was elected to the Auckland Provincial Council at the 1853 New Zealand provincial elections. He represented the Suburbs of Auckland electorate in the first council, from 20 July 1853 until 25 September 1855. He then represented the Auckland West electorate in the fifth council from 2 May 1867 until 27 May 1868. He was a member of the executive council for three periods (14 March 1854 – 21 January 1855; 8 April 1864 – 4 November 1864; 6 May 1867 – 6 February 1868) and during some of that time, he was Provincial Secretary.

Gilfillan died on 1 February 1875 from chronic bronchitis, aged 53 years.
