= James Kelham =

New Zealand politician

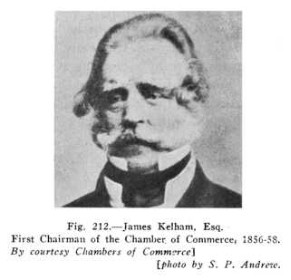

Member of the 1st New Zealand Parliament for City of Wellington
- In office 1854–1855
- Prime Minister: James FitzGerald (head of the Executive Council)
- Preceded by: n/a
- Succeeded by: Isaac Featherston; William Fitzherbert

Personal details
- Born: 1796
- Died: 1882 (aged 85–86) Hutt
- Occupation: Accountant

James Kelham (1796 – 1 April 1882) was a New Zealand businessman and politician.

== Biography ==
New Zealand Parliament
Years	Term	Electorate	Party
1853–1855	1st	City of Wellington	Independent

He arrived in Wellington in the ship London in 1842, and was the New Zealand Company's accountant in Wellington. He was prominent in Wellington's early business community, and was elected as first chairman of the Wellington Chamber of Commerce in 1856.

He represented the City of Wellington in the 1st New Zealand Parliament, but resigned on 3 August 1855. He also served on the Wellington Provincial Council, representing the City of Wellington electorate in 1856. He was made a justice of the peace in 1870. He owned land in Lower Hutt where he had a cottage built in the 1870s or 1880s; the building is these days the gatehouse of Vogel House.

He is buried in St James (Anglican) Churchyard, Lower Hutt. Ward's Early Wellington erroneously says he died in 1862.
