= Rangitikei =

Rangitikei may refer to the following in New Zealand:

- Rangitīkei River, one of country's longest rivers
- Rangitikei District, a district council in the Manawatu-Wanganui Region
- Rangitīkei (New Zealand electorate), a current general electorate

- 1978 Rangitikei by-election, a by-election held in 1978

- Wanganui and Rangitikei, a historic general electorate
