= Loughlin O'Brien =

New Zealand politician & judge (1821–1901)

Loughlin O'Brien (23 November 1821 – 17 April 1901), often spelled Laughlin O'Brien, was a New Zealand politician and judge.

== Early life ==
O'Brien was born in 1821 in Dublin, Ireland, and arrived in New Zealand in 1842. His father was Andrew O'Brien, who represented the City of Auckland electorate in the Auckland Provincial Council.

He married Hélène Leopoldine Francoise Isabelle De Witte at St Patrick's Cathedral, Auckland, on 4 February 1856, with the wedding ceremony carried out by Bishop Pompallier. His Belgian-born wife was from Waiheke Island, and her father Charles Antoine Joseph De Witte was the Belgian consul to New Zealand.

== Professional career ==
He trained as a solicitor, first under Mr Conroy and then under Frederick Merriman. He was one of the first two solicitors to be submitted to the Supreme Court in 1851 after having trained in New Zealand. In 1856, he was appointed sheriff for the Auckland district. He was registrar of the Supreme Court from 1865 to 1870, when he retired with a pension. In 1880, he was appointed judge at the Native Land Court. He retired from the bench in circa 1899.

== Politics ==
New Zealand Parliament
Years	Term	Electorate	Party
1853–1855	1st	City of Auckland	Independent

O'Brien represented the City of Auckland electorate in the 1st New Zealand Parliament from 1853 to 1855, when he retired. He did not serve in any subsequent Parliaments. He was returning officer for the 1855 election for the City of Auckland, Suburbs of Auckland, and Northern Division electorates. He also acted as returning officer for elections to the Auckland Provincial Council, including elections of the Superintendent.

== Death ==
O'Brien resided at St Georges Bay Road, Parnell, and later, at Putiki Bay, Ostend on Waiheke Island. He died at Woodside Private Hospital in Burleigh Street, Auckland, on 17 April 1901 following a long illness. He was buried in Waikaraka Cemetery, Onehunga, Auckland. He was survived by his wife, two sons, and two daughters.
