= 1854 City of Auckland by-election =

New Zealand by-election

The 1854 City of Auckland by-election was a by-election held in the multi-member City of Auckland electorate on 4 August 1854 during the 1st New Zealand Parliament. It was one of the earliest by-elections in New Zealand political history and was triggered by the resignation of Thomas Bartley. Bartley resigned on 11 July 1854 to take up a place in the Legislative Council.

The election was won by William Brown over John Williamson.

== Nomination meeting ==
The nomination meeting was held on 1 August, at a time soon after midday. Thomas Beckham, the returning officer and a future MP of the electorate, kicked off the meeting by reading out the writ. Alexander Black was the first elector to nominate someone, that person being John Williamson. Coolahan seconded that nomination, his reasons being that Williamson had acted well in the Provincial Council. Joseph Newman then counterproposed William Brown, an action seconded by James George. With no other electors advancing a nomination, Beckham declared a show of hands to be called. After the show of hands Beckham stated that it was in favour of Brown. Williamson then demanded a poll, which was won by Brown.

== Results ==
1854 City of Auckland by-election
Party	Candidate	Votes	%	±%
Independent	William Brown	367	63.72	
Independent	John Williamson	209	36.28	
Turnout		576		
Majority		158	27.43	
