= 1860–1861 New Zealand general election =

1860–1861 general election
- 12 December 1860 – 28 March 1861

All 53 seats in the New Zealand House of Representatives
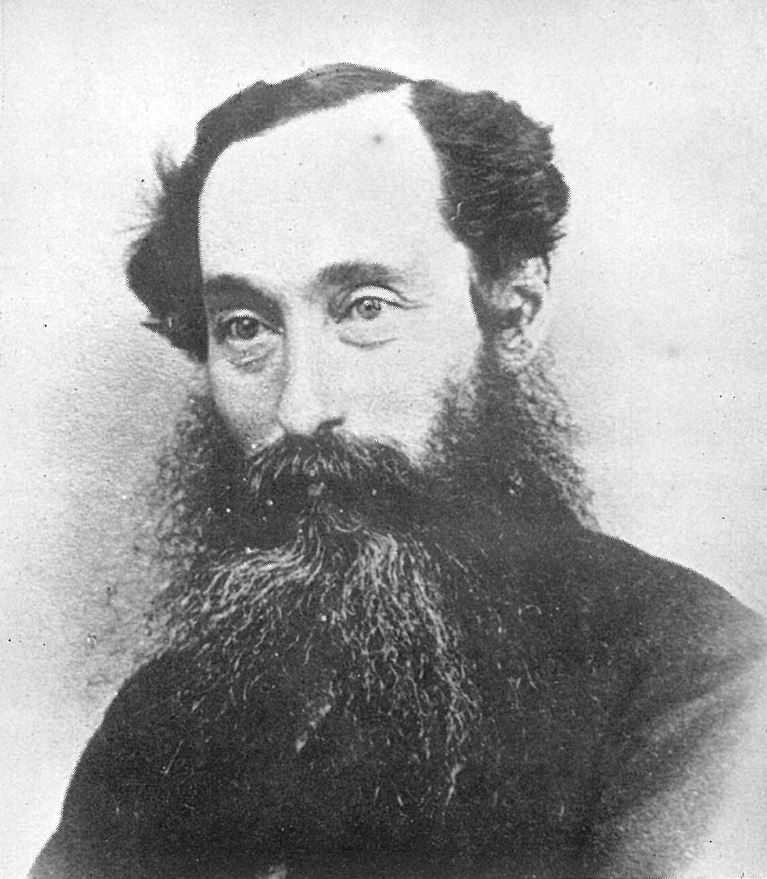
	First party
Leader	Edward Stafford
Party	Independent
Leader's seat	City of Nelson
Last election	53 seats
Seats won	53
Seat change	Steady
Premier before election
Edward Stafford
Independent
Subsequent Premier
Edward Stafford
Independent

The 1860–1861 New Zealand general election was held between 12 December 1860 and 28 March 1861 to elect 53 MPs to the third session of the New Zealand Parliament. 13,196 electors were registered.

1860 was the year in which gold miners who held a Miner's Right continuously for at least three months were able to vote without having to own, lease or rent property.

== Results ==
Member	Electorate	Province	MP's term	Election date
Augustus White	Akaroa	Canterbury	First	13 February 1861
Thomas Russell	Auckland East	Auckland	First	11 January 1861
Josiah Firth	Auckland West	Auckland	First	11 January 1861
John Williamson	Auckland West	Auckland	Second	11 January 1861
Alfred Creyke	Avon	Canterbury	First	1 February 1861
Hugh Carleton	Bay of Islands	Auckland	Third	13 February 1861
Thomas Gillies	Bruce	Otago	Second	11 February 1861
Charles Kettle	Bruce	Otago	First	11 February 1861
Frederick Weld	Cheviot	Canterbury	Third	1 March 1861
John Cracroft Wilson	City of Christchurch	Canterbury	First	31 January 1861
John Ormond	Clive	Hawke's Bay	First	20 February 1861
Andrew Richmond	Collingwood	Nelson	First	4 February 1861
Thomas Dick	City of Dunedin	Otago	First	24 December 1860
Edward McGlashan	City of Dunedin	Otago	First	24 December 1860
Thomas Rowley	Ellesmere	Canterbury	First	25 January 1861
Robert Graham	Franklin	Auckland	Second	28 January 1861
Marmaduke Nixon	Franklin	Auckland	First	28 January 1861
William King	Grey and Bell	Taranaki	First	27 November 1860
Thomas Fraser	Hampden	Otago	First	20 February 1861
George Hall	Heathcote	Canterbury	First	12 February 1861
William Fitzherbert	Hutt	Wellington	Second	12 December 1860
Alfred Renall	Hutt	Wellington	Second	12 December 1860
Isaac Cookson	Kaiapoi	Canterbury	Second	7 February 1861
Crosbie Ward	Town of Lyttelton	Canterbury	Second	25 January 1861
John Munro	Marsden	Auckland	First	20 January 1861
William Butler	Mongonui	Auckland	First	30 January 1861
Herbert Curtis	Motueka	Nelson	Second	5 February 1861
Henry Stark	Napier	Hawke's Bay	First	19 February 1861
Alfred Domett	City of Nelson	Nelson	Second	27 December 1860
Edward Stafford	City of Nelson	Nelson	Second	27 December 1860
James Wemyss	Suburbs of Nelson	Nelson	First	28 January 1861
William Richmond	Town of New Plymouth	Taranaki	Second	28 December 1860
George Graham	Newton	Auckland	First	28 January 1861
Thomas Henderson	Northern Division	Auckland	Second	22 January 1861
James O'Neill	Northern Division	Auckland	Second	22 January 1861
James Richmond	Omata	Taranaki	First	30 November 1860
Maurice O'Rorke	Town of Onehunga	Auckland	First	18 January 1861
Reader Wood	Parnell	Auckland	First	15 January 1861
William Mason	Pensioner Settlements	Auckland	First	21 January 1861
David Monro	Picton	Marlborough	Third	16 February 1861
Alfred Brandon	Porirua	Wellington	Second	20 December 1860
Charles Taylor	Raglan	Auckland	Third	11 February 1861
William Fox	Rangitiki	Wellington	Second	4 February 1861
Francis Jollie	Timaru	Canterbury	First	25 March 1861
Alfred Saunders	Waimea	Marlborough	First	1 February 1861
Charles Carter	Wairarapa	Wellington	Second	12 December 1860
William Eyes	Wairau	Marlborough	First	15 February 1861
Dillon Bell	Wallace	Otago	Second	14 March 1861
Walter Mantell	Wallace	Otago	First	14 March 1861
Henry Harrison	Wanganui	Wellington	First	1 February 1861
Isaac Featherston	City of Wellington	Wellington	Third	11 December 1860
William Rhodes	City of Wellington	Wellington	Third	11 December 1860
William Taylor	City of Wellington	Wellington	First	11 December 1860
