= 1864 Franklin by-election =

New Zealand by-election

The 1864 Franklin by-election was a by-election held on 13 October 1864 in the Franklin electorate during the 3rd New Zealand Parliament.

The by-election was caused by the death of the incumbent MP Marmaduke Nixon on 27 May 1864, killed during the New Zealand Wars.

The by-election was won by Theodore Haultain. As no other candidates were nominated, he was declared duly elected.
