= William Waring Taylor =

New Zealand politician (1819–1903)

New Zealand Parliament
Years	Term	Electorate	Party
1860–1866	3rd	City of Wellington	Independent
1866–1870	4th	City of Wellington	Independent

William Waring Taylor (1819–1903) was a 19th-century Member of Parliament in Wellington, New Zealand.

== Biography ==
Waring Taylor was born in Yorkshire in 1819. He was the brother of Mary Taylor. Waring Taylor was a schoolmate of English novelist Charlotte Brontë, who noted that he was "destined to grow up an original ... [A] unique stamp will mark him always." He was also described as "a kindly, well-meaning muddler." He left England and arrived in Wellington in 1842 and went into business as a merchant in Te Aro. He went on to acquire multiple rural properties through the 1870s which grew his wealth considerably. His business interests included and importing agency, land speculation, wool, cattle and clothing.

In 1860 he became the deputy Superintendent of Wellington Province, later serving as its speaker from 1865 to 1875. He represented the City of Wellington electorate from the 1860 general election to 1870 when he retired.

He slipped into financial difficulty during the Long depression of the 1880s. Encountering financial trouble over a property in Wairarapa where he was accused of misappropriation of trust funds. In 1884 he appeared in bankruptcy court to much publicity, later facing fraud charges in the Supreme Court. In July 1885, aged 66-years-old, Taylor was sentenced to five years in prison. The New Zealand Times newspaper described him as holding the "undisputed championship amongst New Zealand defaulters and scoundrels."

Following his conviction councillor James Petherick moved that the name Waring Taylor "be struck off the plans of the city", and that in future Waring Taylor street be called Britannia Street. Other councillors rejected Petherick's motion. The city council's buildings were located on Waring Taylor street at the time.
