= Electoral history of John Ballance =

List of elections featuring John Ballance as a candidate

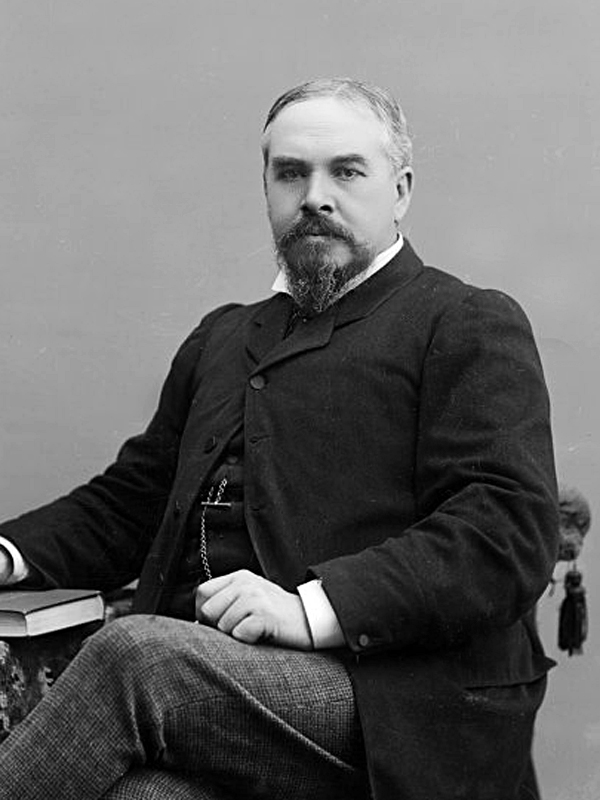
John Ballance, ca 1880s.

This is a summary of the electoral history of John Ballance, Prime Minister of New Zealand, (1891–93) and Leader of the Opposition (1889–1891).

== Parliamentary elections ==
=== 1875 by-election ===
1875 Rangitikei by-election
Party	Candidate	Votes	%	±%
Independent	John Ballance	112	45.90	
Independent	William Hogg Watt	105	43.03	
Independent	George Hutchison	27	11.06	
Majority		7	2.86	
Turnout		244		

=== 1876 election ===
General election, 1876: Rangitikei
Party	Candidate	Votes	%	±%
Independent	John Ballance	201	61.28	+15.38
Independent	James Bull	127	38.72	
Majority		74	22.56	+19.70
Turnout		328	26.64	
Registered electors		1,231		

=== 1879 election ===
General election, 1879: Wanganui
Party	Candidate	Votes	%	±%
Independent	John Bryce	560	69.65	
Independent	John Ballance	547	68.03	
Independent	Sir William Fox	501	62.31	
Majority		46	5.72	
Turnout		804	59.73	
Registered electors		1,346		

=== 1881 election ===
General election, 1881: Wanganui
Party	Candidate	Votes	%	±%
Independent	William Hogg Watt	397	50.25	
Independent	John Ballance	393	49.75	−18.28
Majority		4	0.50	
Turnout		790	64.17	+4.44
Registered electors		1,231		

=== 1884 election ===
General election, 1884: Wanganui
Party	Candidate	Votes	%	±%
Independent	John Ballance	541	60.11	+10.36
Independent	George Hutchison	205	22.77	
Independent	William Hogg Watt	154	17.11	−33.14
Majority		336	37.33	2.69
Turnout		900	66.86	
Registered electors		1,346		

=== 1887 election ===
General election, 1887: Wanganui
Party	Candidate	Votes	%	±%
Independent	John Ballance	865	66.80	+6.69
Independent	Gilbert Carson	430	33.20	
Majority		435	33.59	+3.74
Turnout		1,295	79.39	+12.53
Registered electors		1,631		

=== 1890 election ===
General election, 1890: Wanganui
Party	Candidate	Votes	%	±%
Liberal	John Ballance	808	50.85	−15.95
Conservative	Gilbert Carson	781	49.15	+15.95
Majority		27	1.69	−31.9
Turnout		1,589	75.20	−4.19
Registered electors		2,113		

== Leadership elections ==
=== 1889 leadership election ===
Name	Votes	Percentage
John Ballance	23	67.6%
William Campbell Walker	11	32.4%
