= William Brown (New Zealand politician) =

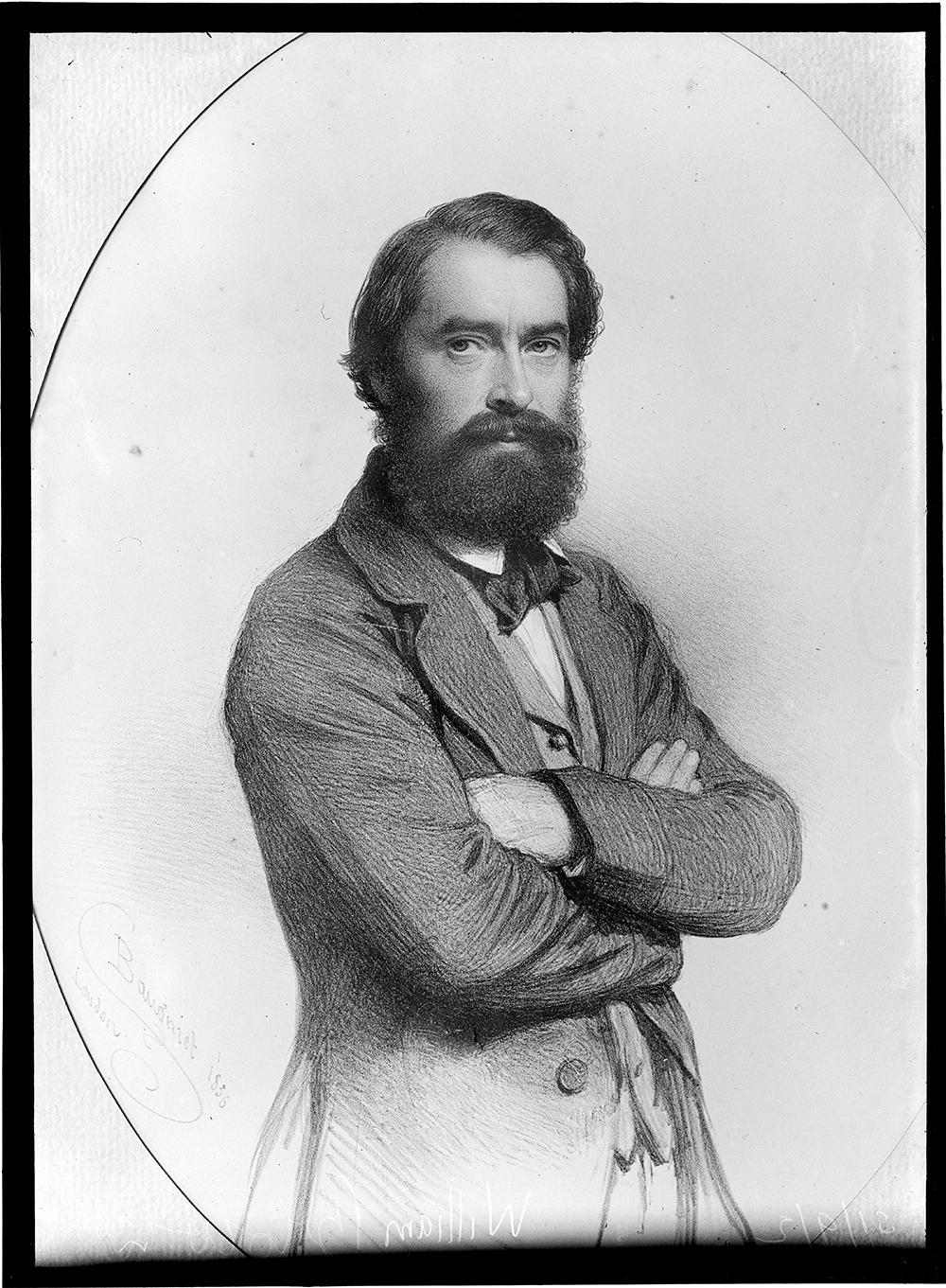
- William Brown in 1856

2nd Superintendent of Auckland Province
- In office 15 March 1855 – November 1855
- Preceded by: Robert Wynyard
- Succeeded by: John Logan Campbell

Personal details
- Born: 1809 or 1810 Angus, Scotland
- Died: 19 January 1898 London, England
- Relations: Marcus Stone (son-in-law)

William Brown (circa 1809/1810 – 19 January 1898) was a 19th-century Scottish-born New Zealand politician, merchant and newspaper proprietor.

== Early life ==
Brown was born in Angus, Scotland, in 1809 or 1810. He moved to New Zealand on 2 February 1840, arriving in the Bay of Islands.

== Business career ==
He made friends with John Logan Campbell on the voyage and they became business partners in New Zealand. They bought Motukorea, to become known as Browns Island, near Auckland, from Ngāti Tamaterā on 22 May 1840 and moved there on 13 August. Brown moved to Auckland in early 1841 and on 19 April 1841 he and Campbell bought a section in Shortland Crescent, where they built Acacia Cottage, the Browns' home, and a store. Acacia Cottage still exists and is now located in Cornwall Park. The firm of Brown and Campbell was very successful, working as auctioneers, shipping agents, importers, and traders with Māori.

== Publisher of The Southern Cross and The Daily Southern Cross ==
William Brown started The Southern Cross newspaper as a weekly paper in 1843. In 1862 it became a daily newspaper, with a change of name to The Daily Southern Cross. The editorial policy was to support the land claimants, such as the New Zealand Company, and the newspaper vigorously attacked Governor George Grey's administration. The Flagstaff War adversely affected business in Auckland, such that The Southern Cross, stop publishing from April 1845 to July 1847.

== Member of Parliament ==
New Zealand Parliament
| Years | Term | Electorate | Party |
|---|---|---|---|
| 1854–1855 | 1st | City of Auckland | Independent |

Brown stood for the newly created position of Superintendent of Auckland Province at the 1853 provincial elections but lost to Robert Wynyard.

He became the Member of Parliament in the 1st Parliament for the City of Auckland from a by-election held on 4 August 1854, when he replaced Thomas Bartley, who had resigned.

He retired on 15 September 1855 at the end of the Parliament's first term and did not seek re-election. Robert Wynyard resigned from the role of Superintendent in January 1855, and Brown was elected the second Superintendent of Auckland in March 1855, beating Frederick Whitaker. Not long after being elected Brown then himself resigned from the role in July 1855, and was replaced by John Logan Campbell.

== Family ==
Brown had already married Jessie Smith when they emigrated to Adelaide in 1839. They had two children: Owen and Laura. His daughter married the painter Marcus Stone. Whilst in the mid-1850s, Brown was probably Auckland's richest man, he had to sell his London house at old age and move in with his daughter and son-in-law. He died on 19 January 1898 in London as a poor man.

Political offices
| Preceded by Robert Wynyard | Superintendent of Auckland Province; 1855 | Succeeded by John Logan Campbell |
