= Marmaduke Nixon =

Soldier in the New Zealand Wars

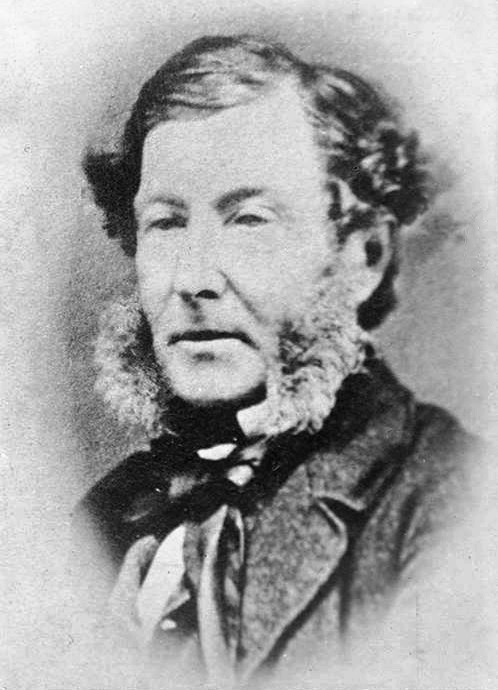

Member of the New Zealand Parliament for Franklin
- In office 28 January 1861 – 27 May 1864
- Succeeded by: Theodore Haultain

Personal details
- Born: 1813 or 14 Valletta, Colony of Malta
- Died: 27 May 1864 (aged 50–51) Auckland, New Zealand
- Resting place: Nixon monument, Ōtāhuhu, New Zealand

Military service
- Branch/service: British Army (1831–1851); New Zealand Militia (1860–1864)
- Rank: Colonel
- Commands: Colonial Defence Force Cavalry
- Battles/wars: Coorg War; Gwalior campaign: Battle of Maharajpore; New Zealand Wars: Invasion of the Waikato

Marmaduke George Nixon (1813 or 1814 – 27 May 1864) was a soldier in the New Zealand Wars. Born in Malta, he joined the British Army in 1831, spending most of his career as an officer in British India with the 39th Regiment of Foot. He left the British Army in 1851 and shortly afterwards emigrated to New Zealand to take up farming in South Auckland. In 1860, during one of the main phases of the New Zealand Wars, he formed and led a cavalry unit in defence of South Auckland. He later participated in the Invasion of the Waikato as commander of Nixon's Horse, another cavalry unit. He was one of the highest ranking casualties of the New Zealand Wars when he died on 27 May 1864 from wounds received in an attack earlier in the year on a village at Rangiaowhia. He was also a Member of Parliament, representing the largely rural electorate of Franklin from 1861 up until his death.

== Early life ==
Marmaduke George Nixon was born in Valletta on the island of Malta in either 1813 or 1814. He was one of at least three children of Henry Nixon, an officer in the British Army, and his wife Elizabeth née Browne. Marmaduke attended the Royal Military College at Sandhurst, from which he graduated in 1831 before he was posted to the 39th (Dorsetshire) Regiment of Foot as an ensign.

== British Army ==
Nixon spent a number of years in British India with the 39th Regiment, serving in the Coorg War of 1834 and was involved in the Battle of Maharajpore during the Gwalior campaign of 1843. At this stage of his career, he was the brigade major of the 5th Brigade. In 1851 Nixon resigned from the British Army, having reached the rank of major. He was finding it difficult to support his two sisters on his income while serving as an officer in India.

== Life in New Zealand ==
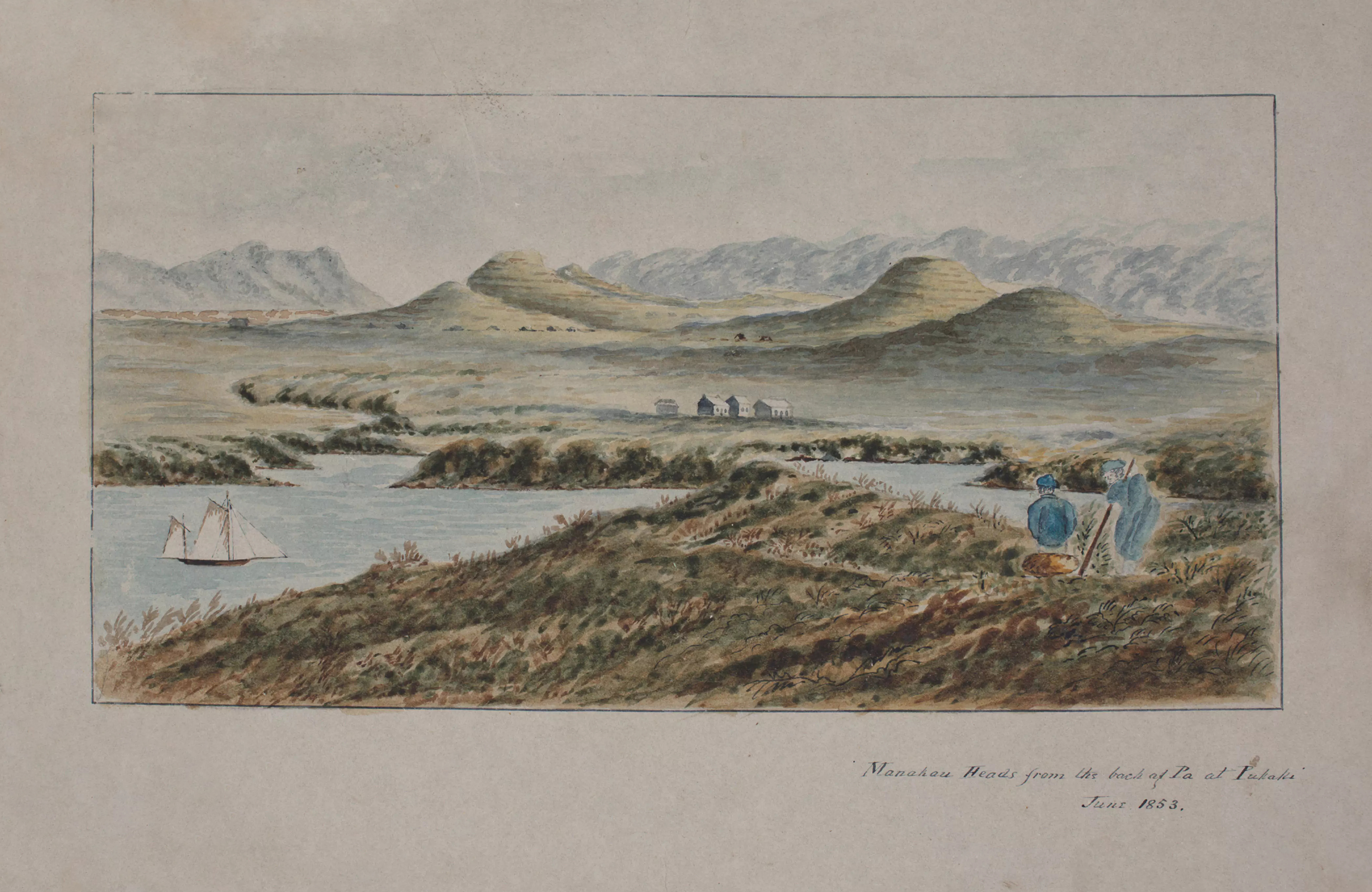
Nixon's farm at Māngere bordering Pukaki Creek in 1853. The European buildings shown are likely Nixon's farm

During his service in British India, Nixon made the acquaintance of Theodore Haultain, a fellow officer of the 39th Regiment who later moved to New Zealand. At Haultain's suggestion, Nixon travelled on the ship Cresswell to settle in New Zealand, arriving in 1852. He began farming at Māngere, south of Auckland. Te Ākitai Waiohua, who lived across Pukaki Creek from Nixon and other Manukau Harbour tribes, assisted Nixon building his farmhouses. Soon, along with other landowners in the area, he sought access to Māori land in the Waikato region. However, by this time, Māori were beginning to become increasingly resistant to selling of their land, leading to increased tensions with the New Zealand Government.

Following the commencement in March 1860 of hostilities at Taranaki, in one of the main phases of the New Zealand Wars, Nixon submitted a proposal to the New Zealand Government for the raising of a force of colonial volunteers. He was made a lieutenant colonel in the Auckland Militia and formed the Royal Volunteer Cavalry, which had responsibility for the townships at Otahuhu, Panmure, and Howick. He also led his forces ensuring the security of the communication and supply routes from Auckland through to defensive positions in South Auckland. In 1861, he stood for the House of Representatives as the member for the Franklin electorate, which encompassed most of rural South Auckland, and was duly elected on 28 January.

The Royal Volunteer Cavalry was disbanded in 1862. However, the following year the Colonial Defence Force Cavalry was formed and Nixon was appointed its commander. He helped in the recruitment for the unit, attracting almost 200 men from Otahuhu, which soon became known as "Nixon's Horse", which had troops at Auckland, Howick and Otahuhu. He is considered the father of New Zealand cavalry for his roles in raising the first units of their type in New Zealand.

=== Invasion of the Waikato ===
New Zealand Parliament
Years	Term	Electorate	Party
1861–1864	3rd	Franklin	Independent

In July 1863, Nixon's Horse was part of the British and Colonial forces, commanded by General Duncan Cameron, that invaded the Waikato region with the intention of suppressing the "Kingitanga Movement", which was resisting colonial rule. Immediately prior to the invasion, Governor Grey ordered all Māori living in the South Auckland region to evict the area, or to swear fealty to the Queen. While leaving for the Waikato, Nixon captured Ihaka Takanini, the paramount chief of Te Ākitai Waiohua and his former neighbour at Māngere. Takanini and his family were taken prisoner to Rakino Island, where he died. By February 1864, after a series of actions as the invasion force moved south along the path of the Waikato River and then the Waipā, Cameron's forces was aiming for the valuable farming land around Te Awamutu. On 21 February, after bypassing Māori at Paterangi they secured a largely unoccupied Te Awamutu.

Beyond the town, 3 miles (4.8 km) away, was the settlement of Rangiaowhia. Cameron opted to advance against this settlement as well. Nixon led the attack on the lightly defended village, at which there were many women and children present. Possibly influenced by the fact that Cameron was observing events, Nixon's leadership of the attack was reckless and he was shot and severely wounded as he approached a hut. About 24 Māori were killed or wounded during the attack and another 33 taken prisoner. The British then withdrew to Te Awamutu. Cameron was later criticised for the Rangiaowhia attack; it was not a fighting pā and the Kingites considered the action contrary to established conduct of warfare. There were also accusations that one or more whare to which some Māori had fled during the Rangiaowhia attack were set on fire with them inside and that one man attempting to surrender was shot.

After Rangiaowhia, Nixon was evacuated north to his property at Mangere. His wounds, to his chest and lungs, ultimately proved fatal and gangrene set in several weeks later. He died at his home on 27 May 1864. The previous month he had been promoted to colonel. He was one of the highest-ranking soldiers to have been a casualty of the New Zealand Wars. Buried at Symonds Street Cemetery, he was survived by his two sisters. Nixon's death resulted in the 1864 Franklin by-election, won unopposed by his friend from his days in the British Army, Haultain.

== Nixon monument ==
Soon after his death, discussions began in relation to the erection of a monument in his memory. By May 1865, land at Ōtāhuhu, south of Auckland, had been acquired for the monument, which was to be based on the Wallace Monument in Scotland. The monument, which stands at the intersection of Mangere and Great South roads, was completed and formally unveiled in 1868. Several compromises had been made in its design and construction; it was now much simpler in appearance and stone from Hobart, in Tasmania, was used instead of being sourced from Oamaru, as originally intended. It was suggested that some of the funds raised for the monument go towards the care of his sisters. The following year, the New Zealand Government granted the sisters an annual pension of £150.

On Anzac Day in 1968, Nixon's remains were moved from Symonds Street Cemetery and re-interred to the base of the monument. In recent years, there have been controversial calls for the removal of the monument.

== Notes ==
New Zealand Parliament
New constituency	Member of Parliament for Franklin; 1861–1864; Served alongside: Robert Graham	Succeeded by Theodore Haultain
