= 1853 New Zealand general election =

General election in New Zealand

- 14 July – 1 October 1853

All 37 seats in the New Zealand House of Representatives
	First party
	Ind
Party	Independent
Last election	37 seats
Seats won	37
Seat change	▲37

The 1853 New Zealand general election was a nationwide vote to determine the shape of the New Zealand Parliament's first term. It was the first national election ever held in New Zealand, although Parliament did not yet have full authority to govern the colony, which was part of the British Empire at that time. Elections for the first provincial councils and their Superintendents were held at the same time.

== Background ==
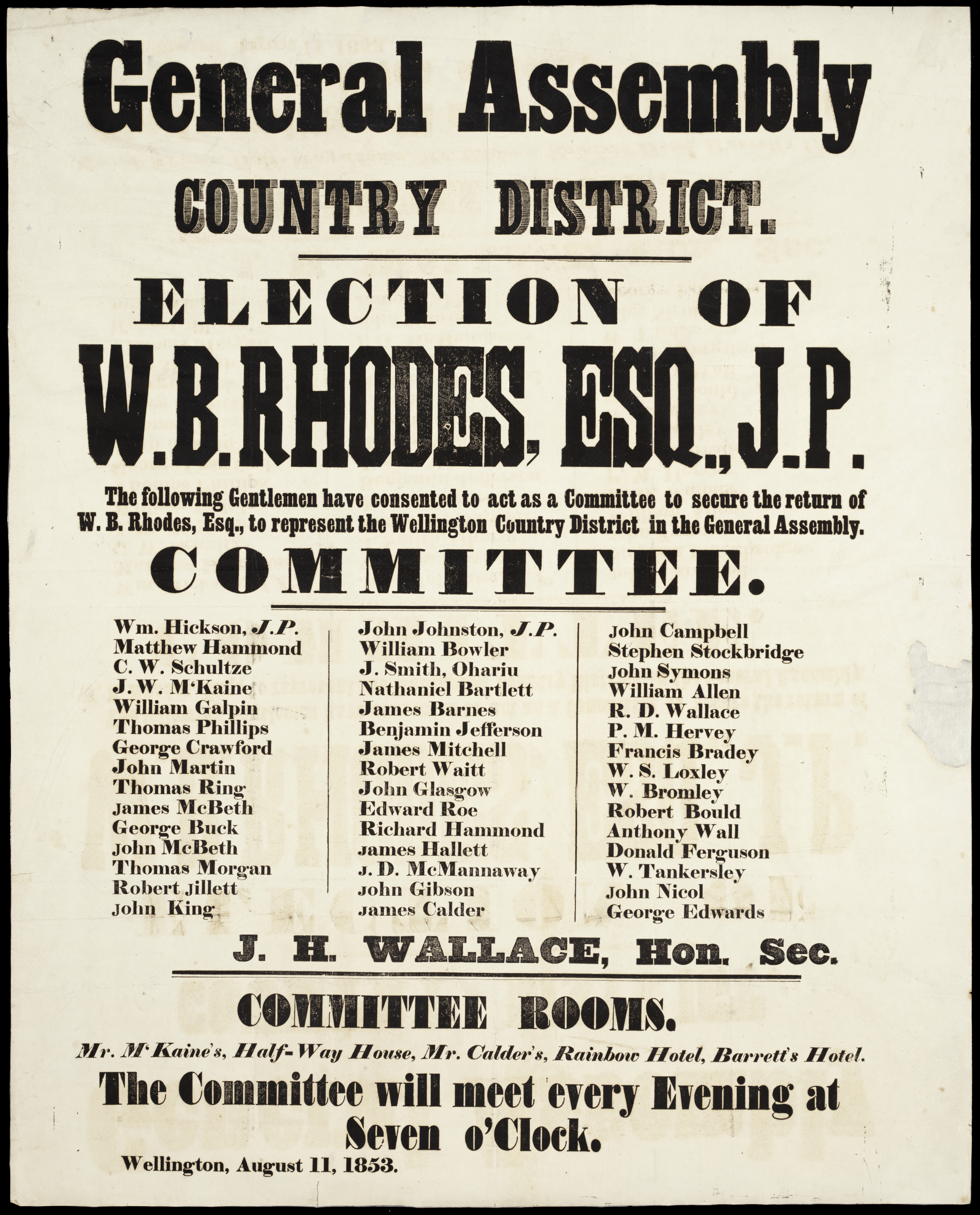
Election poster in support of William Barnard Rhodes, standing for Wellington Country

The New Zealand Constitution Act 1852, passed by the Parliament of the United Kingdom, established a bicameral New Zealand Parliament, with the lower house (the House of Representatives) being elected by popular vote. Votes were to be cast under a simple FPP system, and the secret ballot had not yet been introduced.

To qualify as a voter, one needed to be male, to be a British subject, to be at least 21 years old, to own a certain value of land, and to not be serving a criminal sentence. One of the candidates elected (on 27 August, for Christchurch Country) was a landowner, but at 20 years and 7 months was not yet 21: he was James Stuart-Wortley.

At the time of the 1853 elections, there were no political parties in New Zealand. As such, all candidates were independents.

== The election ==
In the 1853 elections, election day was different in each seat. The first seat to be elected was Bay of Islands on 14 July, and the final election day was on 1 October. Hugh Carleton (Bay of Islands) was the first MP ever elected in New Zealand (though he was elected unopposed), so he liked to be called the Father of the House.

There were 5,849 people registered to vote.

The total number of seats was 37.

Twenty-four electoral districts were used. Some districts elected multiple MPs (they elected using block voting). Wellington and Auckland had three members each. Suburbs of Auckland, Christchurch, Dunedin, Hutt, Nelson, Northern, Pensioner, Southern and Waimea each had two members. Thirteen members were elected in single-member districts using first past the post. Some parts of the colony were not part of any district and did not have representation in Parliament.

== Results ==
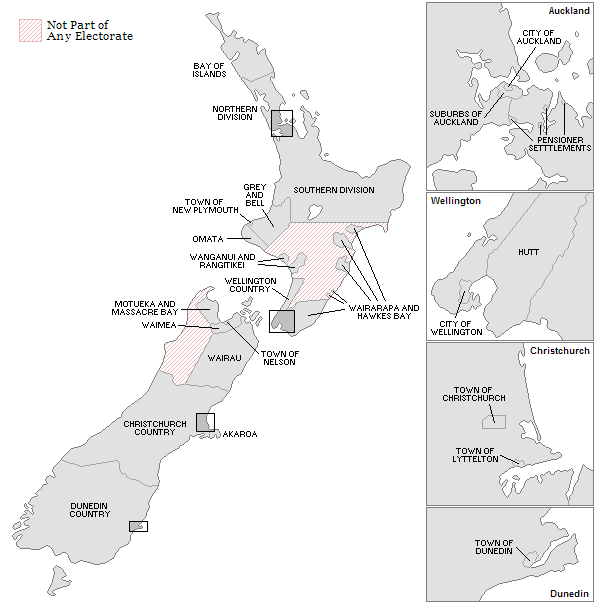

Member	Electorate	Province	Election date
William Moorhouse	Akaroa	Canterbury	24 August
Thomas Bartley	City of Auckland	Auckland	11 August
Loughlin O'Brien	City of Auckland	Auckland	11 August
James O'Neill	City of Auckland	Auckland	11 August
Frederick Merriman	Suburbs of Auckland	Auckland	10 August
William Porter	Suburbs of Auckland	Auckland	10 August
Hugh Carleton	Bay of Islands	Auckland	14 July
James Stuart-Wortley	Christchurch Country	Canterbury	27 August
Jerningham Wakefield	Christchurch Country	Canterbury	27 August
Henry Sewell	Town of Christchurch	Canterbury	20 August
John Cargill	Dunedin Country	Otago	1 October
William Cutten	Dunedin Country	Otago	1 October
James Macandrew	Town of Dunedin	Otago	27 September
Thomas King	Grey and Bell	New Plymouth	27 August
Alfred Ludlam	Hutt	Wellington	18 August
Edward Gibbon Wakefield	Hutt	Wellington	19 August
James FitzGerald	Town of Lyttelton	Canterbury	17 August
Alfred Picard	Motueka and Massacre Bay	Nelson	18 August
James Mackay	Town of Nelson	Nelson	25 July
William Travers	Town of Nelson	Nelson	25 July
Francis Gledhill	Town of New Plymouth	New Plymouth	26 August
Thomas Forsaith	Northern Division	Auckland	23 August
Walter Lee	Northern Division	Auckland	23 August
William Crompton	Omata	New Plymouth	26 August
John Bacot	Pensioner Settlements	Auckland	13 August
Joseph Greenwood	Pensioner Settlements	Auckland	13 August
Charles Taylor	Southern Division	Auckland	23 August
John Gray	Southern Division	Auckland	23 August
William Cautley	Waimea	Nelson	16 August
David Monro	Waimea	Nelson	16 August
Samuel Revans	Wairarapa and Hawke's Bay	Wellington	12 August
Frederick Weld	Wairau	Nelson	2 August
Isaac Featherston	Wanganui and Rangitikei	Wellington	12 August
Charles Clifford	City of Wellington	Wellington	15 August
Robert Hart	City of Wellington	Wellington	15 August
James Kelham	City of Wellington	Wellington	15 August
William Rhodes	Wellington Country	Wellington	18 August
