= Theodore Haultain =

New Zealand politician and botanist (1817–1902)

The Honourable Theodore Haultain
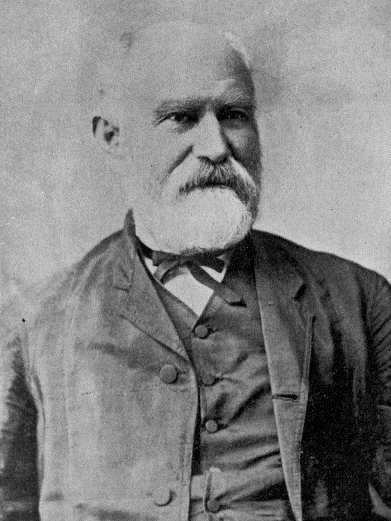

3rd Minister of Defence
- In office 31 October 1865 – 28 June 1869
- Prime Minister: Edward Stafford
- Preceded by: Harry Atkinson
- Succeeded by: Donald McLean

Member of the New Zealand Parliament for Franklin
- In office 1864–1870

Member of the New Zealand Parliament for Southern Division
- In office 1858–1860

Personal details
- Born: 27 May 1817 Stony Stratford, Buckinghamshire, England
- Died: 18 October 1902 (aged 85) Parnell, Auckland, New Zealand
- Spouse: Jane Alison Bell (m. 7 November 1844–)
- Relations: Charles Morison (son-in-law)
- Children: four sons and five daughters

Theodore Minet Haultain (27 May 1817 – 18 October 1902) was a 19th-century New Zealand politician and Minister of Colonial Defence (1865–69). He came to New Zealand as a soldier and farmed in south Auckland.

== Personal life ==
Theodore Minet Haultain was born according to family information on 27 May 1817 at Stony Stratford, Buckinghamshire, England, the son of Second Captain Francis Haultain, Royal Artillery, and his wife, Eliza Ann Dean. He went to Sandhurst from 1831 to 1834 and after being commissioned on 27 June spent ten years with the 39th Regiment of Foot in India. He took part in the Gwalior campaign and saw action at the battle of Maharajpur on 29 December 1843. On 7 November 1844, Haultain married Jane Alison Bell, daughter of William Bell, at Agra, India. They had four sons and five daughters. His youngest daughter married the barrister Charles Morison. Haultain returned to England in June 1847 and was appointed staff officer of pensioners on 14 March 1849, and captain on 30 March.

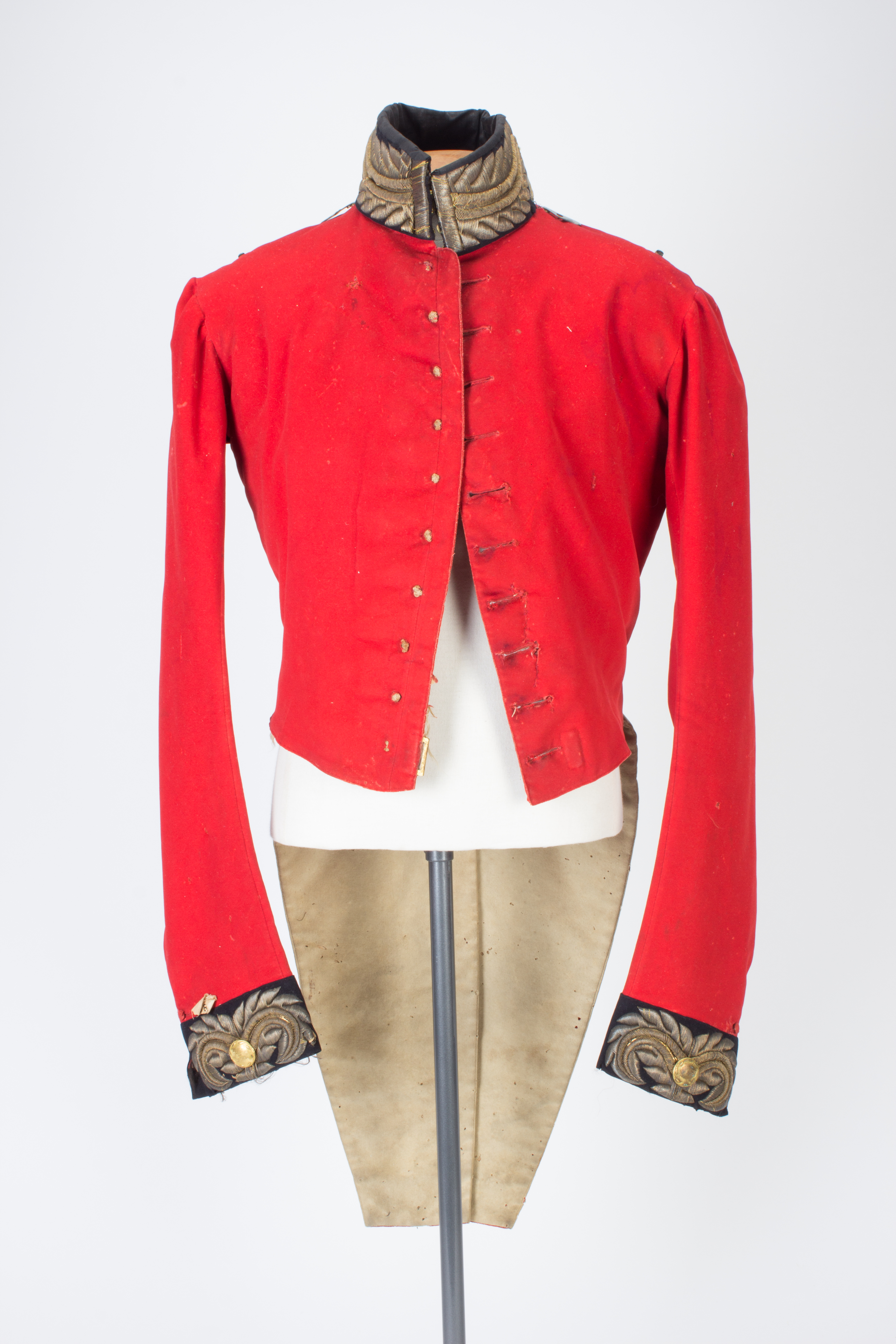
Haultain's Staff Officer of Pensioners coatee, Royal New Zealand Fencible Corps, 1846 dress regulations. Auckland War Memorial Museum

On 16 May 1849, as a family man without notable career prospects, Haultain emigrated to Auckland, New Zealand, on the Oriental Queen, in charge of the 8th Detachment of the Royal New Zealand Fencible Corps, military pensioners who were settled in villages to protect the southern approaches to Auckland. He commanded first at Onehunga, and then at Panmure.

== Career ==
=== Early politics ===
Haultain took a number of public positions, becoming a member of Auckland's first borough council on 18 November 1851 and resident magistrate at Onehunga in 1855 and at Howick in 1856. He resigned from the army in March 1857 and devoted himself to farming at Mangere. He contested a by-election in the electorate of the Southern Division (of Auckland) on 8 May 1858 against David Graham and was elected. He represented the electorate until the end of the term in 1860, when he was defeated for the Raglan electorate by Charles John Taylor.

=== Military career ===
Haultain's life had settled into the easy domesticity of the retired soldier but the outbreak of fighting in Taranaki in 1860 changed all that. The immediate effect on Auckland was to arouse fears for the town's safety. Haultain was asked by the Stafford government to help organise a defence force and he became on 26 April 1860 lieutenant colonel of the 1st Battalion, Auckland Militia.

In July 1863 Governor George Grey and the colonial government invaded Waikato. To hold the land seized from the 'rebellious' tribes, the New Zealand Settlements Act 1863, less euphemistically known as the Confiscation Act, provided extensive grants to military settlers. Four regiments of Waikato Militia were raised on this basis and Haultain recruited and took command of the 2nd Regiment.

The campaign, which took just under a year, was conducted by the regular British regiments. The colonial troops, other than a few cavalry and rangers, helped guard the ever-lengthening supply lines. In March 1864, while garrisoning the redoubt at Kihikihi, Haultain was informed that Maori entrenching parties were building fortifications at Orakau. The nearest imperial forces hurried up and he joined them for the attack on Rewi Maniapoto at Orakau pa.

After the battle Haultain was promoted to full colonel and on 6 February 1865 became colonel commandant of all four Waikato regiments. He turned his administrative talents to settling the militia on the lands promised to them. His instructions from the defence minister were to settle the troops around strategic villages guarding the confiscation line.

In June 1864, he selected sites for Alexandra (Pirongia), where his own regiment was stationed, and Cambridge, Kihikihi and Kirikiriroa as centres for each of the remaining regiments. He was looking for defensive strengths, but in setting the surveyors to work at Kirikiriroa he became the founder of the town that two months later became Hamilton.

Once the town sites were selected, farms were surveyed and allotments distributed according to rank. Haultain declined to take up the 400 acres (1.6 km^{2}) to which he was entitled, perhaps to avoid any suspicion of partiality in making the allotments. The process was done in haste. In February 1865, the new Weld government instructed Haultain to remove all the remaining soldiers from the pay and ration lists. As their supplies dried up in the following months families deserted in droves. The military settlements were a failure.

=== Return to Parliament ===
New Zealand Parliament
| Years | Term | Electorate | Party |
|---|---|---|---|
| 1858–1860 | 2nd | Southern Division | Independent |
| 1864–1866 | 3rd | Franklin | Independent |
| 1866–1870 | 4th | Franklin | Independent |

In October 1864, Haultain was returned to the House of Representatives for Franklin. He resigned his commission in mid-1865 to free himself for politics, and in particular to express his opposition to Weld's policy of seeking the withdrawal of the imperial regiments.

Weld's call for self-reliance became a major issue in colonial politics over the next five years. With the Waikato war over, the Weld government felt it could dispense with the imperial army, save money by greatly reducing the scale of its military operations, and end 'double government' by George Grey.

The plan inspired the colony but in October 1865, Weld was succeeded as premier by Edward Stafford, who formed a cabinet which included Haultain as minister for colonial defence. Before accepting the position, Haultain was careful to get a commitment that the government would retain some imperial troops. Stafford was happy to agree, but pressures of economy and of holding together the fractious provinces in time turned the policy of self-reliance inside out. The colony's military establishment shrank month by month and Stafford, with help from successive governors, danced an undignified minuet with the Colonial Office, aimed at keeping some British troops without paying for them.

Haultain played little part in these manoeuvres. As a professional military man he saw his task as making the best of what little was available. By early 1867, he had come to accept that if the imperial troops 'are not to be at our disposal, we had better be without them – but then I don't see how the defence of the Northern Island is to be maintained by the small quota of Police we proposed to raise.'

The dilemma was masked for over two years by a relative lull in the fighting. In 1867, Haultain brought in the Armed Constabulary Act. This at last established the small regular force envisaged by Weld and thus marked the beginning of New Zealand's standing army, but when the crisis broke in mid-1868 the five divisions of the Armed Constabulary were still indifferently trained and equipped, regularly unsober and less regularly paid.

Te Kooti's landing in Tūranganui-a-Kiwa / Poverty Bay and Tītokowaru's campaign to recover his confiscated lands in South Taranaki revealed the inadequacy of Stafford's preparations. With the scratch forces it had, the government had for the first time to take the field as principals unsupported by imperial troops. On 7 September 1868, Tītokowaru roundly defeated the colonial forces at Te Ngutu-o-te-manu and Haultain went immediately to the front to shore up the demoralised forces. He sent all the liquor back to Wanganui (he was in later years president of the Auckland Total Abstinence Society), disbanded a mutinous division of the Armed Constabulary and ordered the defensive line to be pulled back to Pātea. Most importantly, he found the force its first effective commander, G. S. Whitmore. When he too suffered defeat on 7 November at Moturoa, Haultain gave him reinforcements and unwavering support despite the settlers' angry 'Thanks to Colonel Haultain and the Government for the ruined misery brought upon this district'.

This battered army was the colony's only strike force, and by November 1867, Te Kooti on the East Coast had become an equally alarming threat. On the advice of Whitmore, Haultain took political responsibility for a bold move. He ordered the remaining forces on the west coast withdrawn to a defensive line on the outskirts of Wanganui, and Whitmore and the Armed Constabulary were shipped to Napier. The gamble paid off. Te Kooti was defeated at Ngatapa in early January 1869 (see Siege of Ngatapa); by mid January Whitmore was back in South Taranaki; and a month later Titokowaru had withdrawn into the bush. Although it was some months before the agitated colony realised it, the crisis was over. The colonists had successfully defended themselves and in the process Haultain's Armed Constabulary had become effective light infantry.

The Stafford ministry fell in June 1869 and on 8 April 1870, Jane Haultain died. Haultain did not stand again in the general election in early 1871. In the 32 years left to him Haultain carried out the community and public duties of a retired soldier. In 1871 he reported on the working of the Native Lands Act and in the following year was made trust commissioner under the Native Lands Frauds Prevention Act. In the same year he became paymaster for imperial pensions. A strong churchman, he served for many years on the Anglican diocesan and general synods of the Anglican church and was a member of the committee which on 13 June 1857 drew up the constitution of the Church of England in New Zealand. He was a member of the Auckland University College council from 1882 and of the board of governors of Auckland Grammar School from 1878 until 1898. He was on the Board of St John's Theological College and was made a Canon of Holy Trinity Cathedral in Auckland where he still has a Canon's seat named after him to this day. Haultain died in Parnell, Auckland, on 18 October 1902 and was buried at St John's College.

As defence minister, Haultain was a soldier in politics rather than a politician. He never distinguished himself as a field commander and had no pretensions as a strategist. His military skills were in organisation. He avoided interference with his commanders, backed up Whitmore and concentrated on providing the practical support that would enable him to succeed. In the crisis of November 1868 his firmness of character brought the colonial forces through a panicky time. The government fell but the New Zealand wars died away in skirmishes. Ironically, since he had taken office with strong misgivings about the self-reliant policy, he as much as anyone can be credited with making Weld's dream work in practice.

While he was Minister of Defence, Haultain personally conducted the Whakamarama campaign (1869).

== Botany ==
Haultain collected plant samples in India, Japan, the Solomon Islands and New Zealand, which the website Bionomia shows are deposited in the Auckland War Memorial Museum collection. Botanist Elizabeth Stack noted in her journal in 1859 that Captain Hainault offered to help her identify her moss and fern specimens.

New Zealand Parliament
| Preceded by Marmaduke Nixon | Member of Parliament for Franklin; 1864–1871; Served alongside: Robert Graham, William Turnbull Swan | Succeeded by William Buckland, Archibald Clark |
