= Thomas Bartley (politician) =

English-born New Zealand politician (1798–1878)

The Honourable Thomas Bartley MLC
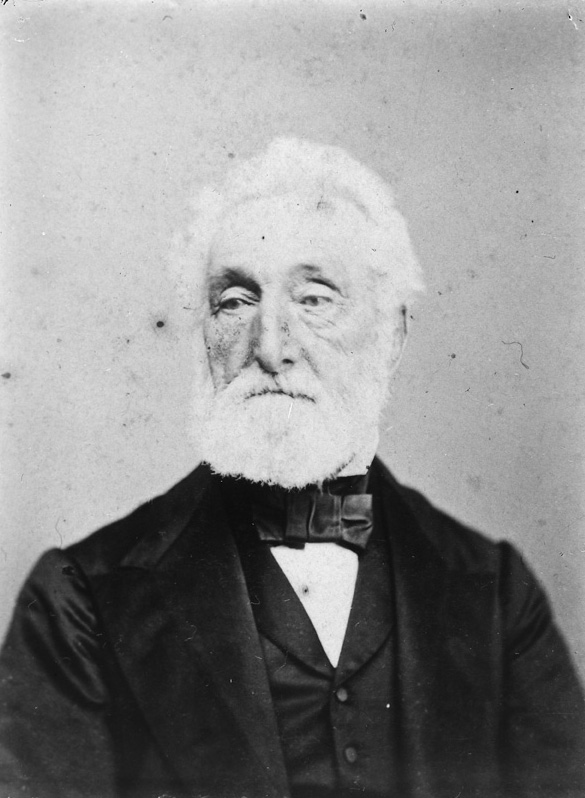
- Thomas Houghton Bartley, c. 1856

3rd Speaker of the Legislative Council
- In office 1856–1868
- Preceded by: Frederick Whitaker
- Succeeded by: John Richardson

Personal details
- Born: 1798 Liverpool, England
- Died: 25 December 1878 (aged 79–80) Auckland, New Zealand
- Party: Independent

Thomas Houghton Bartley JP (1798 – 25 December 1878) was an English-born New Zealand politician.

== Biography ==
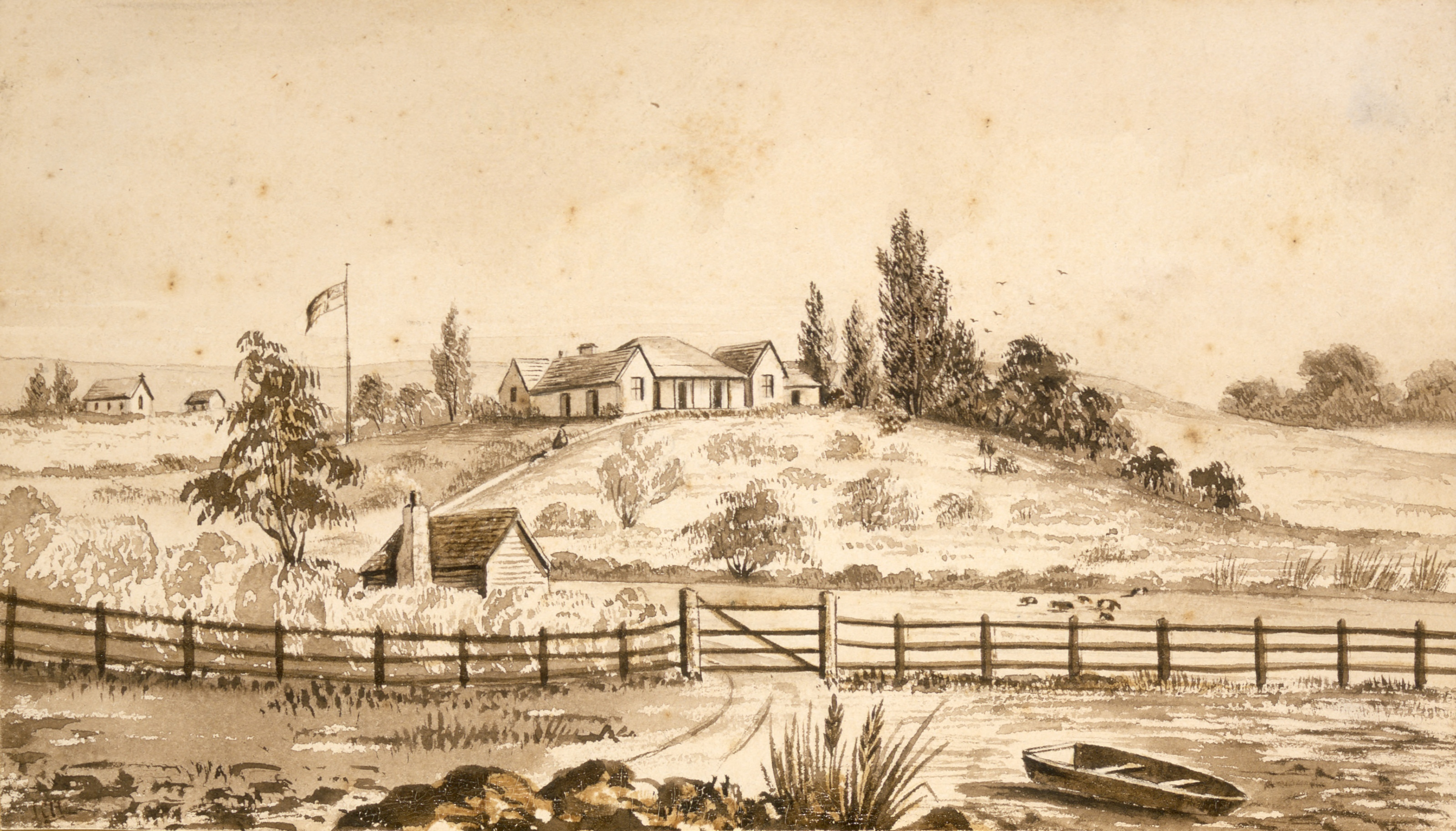
The farm of Thomas Bartley on the North Shore

Bartley was born in 1798 in Liverpool. Like his brother William, he was a lawyer. In 1838, both of them were in Adelaide. William Bartley stayed in that city and became attorney for the South Australian Company, but Thomas Bartley went to New Zealand in 1839 and settled in the Bay of Islands. In 1841, he moved to Auckland, where he worked as a solicitor.

== Politics ==
He represented the City of Auckland electorate on the first and second councils of the Auckland Province (20 July 1853 – 15 July 1854; 26 October 1855 – 18 August 1857). He was the first Deputy-Superintendent of Auckland Province (18 September 1856 – 11 November 1856) and the first Speaker of the Province (1853–1857). As Speaker, he was succeeded by William Powditch.

Bartley served in the First New Zealand Parliament, representing the City of Auckland electorate. He was elected on 11 August 1853 and resigned on 11 July 1854. He was a member of the 1854 FitzGerald Ministry, led by James FitzGerald, from 11 July 1854 to 2 August 1854.

New Zealand Parliament
Years	Term	Electorate	Party
1853–1854	1st	City of Auckland	Independent

Bartley resigned from the House of Representatives on 11 August 1854 to take up a position in the Legislative Council, where he served as Speaker from 12 May 1856 to 1 July 1868. His membership of the Legislative Council lapsed on 3 July 1874 due to non-attendance.

Bartley was appointed a justice of the peace in 1856. He died on 25 December 1878 at his home in Stokes' Point (these days, the locality is the northern landing of the Auckland Harbour Bridge). He is buried in Parnell, Auckland.

== Notes ==
Political offices
Preceded by Frederick Whitaker	Speaker of the New Zealand Legislative Council; 1856–1868	Succeeded by John Richardson
New Zealand Parliament
New constituency	Member of Parliament for City of Auckland; 1853–1854; Served alongside: Loughlin O'Brien, James O'Neill	Succeeded by William Brown
