= Charles John Taylor =

New Zealand politician

New Zealand Parliament
Years	Term	Electorate	Party
1853–1855	1st	Southern Division	Independent
1855–1858	2nd	Southern Division	Independent
1861–1865	3rd	Raglan	Independent

Charles John Taylor (1826 – 22 April 1897) was a New Zealand politician.

He was the second son of General Taylor (1790–1868) who owned land at West Tamaki. Charles was a judge in India before emigrating to New Zealand, and was a director of The Bank of New Zealand, of which his brother, Allan Kerr Taylor, was auditor

Charles John Taylor lived at Glen Orchard (now Saint Heliers, Auckland), and had two brothers and one half-brother who also lived in Auckland: William Innes Taylor at Glen Innes, and Richard James Taylor at Glen Dowie. The names of the latter two properties became the names of the suburbs Glen Innes and Glendowie respectively.

The half-brother, Allan Kerr Taylor, lived in Mount Albert in a house called Alberton. The Mount Albert Taylors became known as the Kerr Taylors or Kerr-Taylors – apparently adopting Allan's middle name as part of their surname.

Charles John Taylor served in the 1st New Zealand Parliament and the 2nd New Zealand Parliament as representative for the Southern Division; (consisting of the Waikato, Bay of Plenty, and East Cape regions). He resigned on 13 April 1858. From the 1861 election, he served in the 3rd New Zealand Parliament as representative for the Raglan electorate. He resigned from Raglan before the end of that term on 1 April 1865.

His election statement for the 1861 election read, "Having always held opinions opposed to a centralising policy, I should vote for the repeal of the "New Provinces Act.” I am prepared to unite with the other representatives of this province in obtaining a sweeping reduction in the expenditure now lavished on an overgrown and daily increasing official staff, and to act in concert with those gentlemen that Auckland may hold the prominent position due to her in the government of the colony." In that election he defeated Theodore Haultain.

He represented the Southern Division electorate on the 3rd Auckland Provincial Council from 26 October 1860 to 12 September 1861. He was appointed to the Legislative Council on 31 March 1869. His membership lapsed on 26 July 1878 through absence, when he and his family went to live in England.

News was received in New Zealand in July 1897 of his death in London, England.

== Notes ==
New Zealand Parliament
New constituency	Member of Parliament for Raglan; 1861–1865	Succeeded by William Buckland
