= William Powditch =

New Zealand politician (1795–1872)

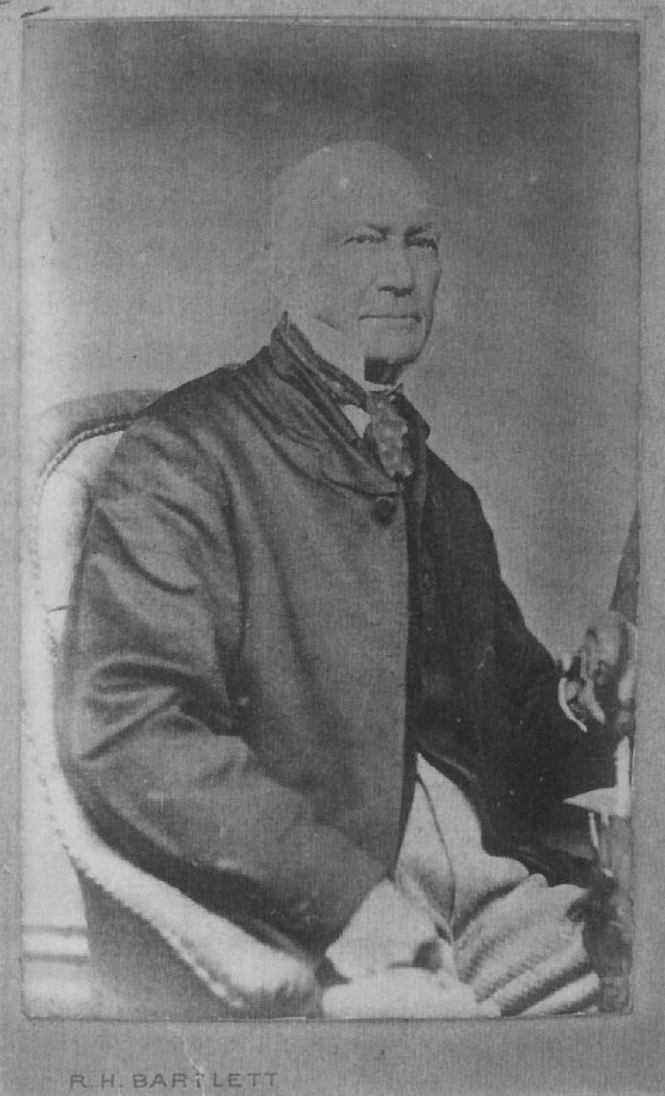
William Powditch in ca 1865–1870

William Powditch (8 February 1795 – 22 August 1872) was a very early settler in New Zealand's Bay of Islands and a politician in Auckland.

== Early life ==
Powditch was born in 1795 in Tynemouth, Northumberland, England. He commanded the Royal George that brought Thomas Brisbane, the incoming Governor of New South Wales, to Sydney in 1821 and accompanied George Arthur, the incoming Lieutenant Governor of Van Diemen's Land on his trip to Tasmania in 1824. In the early 1820s, he was living in Australia's Hunter Valley.

On 19 June 1823, he married Anne Walsh at Bloomsbury, County of Middlesex, England.

== New Zealand ==
He was a trader in the Bay of Islands when the Postmaster-General of New South Wales appointed him in 1831 "to receive and return mail"; this was the first postal service between Australia and New Zealand.

In 1845, Powditch moved to Auckland. In the first elections to the Auckland Provincial Council on 22 July 1853, he was elected in the Pensioner Settlements electorate. He also stood for election to Parliament in the Southern Division electorate but was unsuccessful. He represented the Pensioner Settlements electorate until February 1856 when he resigned, and again from April 1857 to September 1861. He then represented the Onehunga electorate until September 1865. From November 1857 to September 1865, he was the 2nd Speaker of the Provincial Council, succeeding Thomas Bartley. When John Williamson resigned as Superintendent, the act stipulated that the Speaker would become Deputy Superintendent, and Powditch had that role from October to November 1862. His membership of the council and his speakership ended when he was defeated by Maurice O'Rorke at 9 November 1865 election for Onehunga, who also succeeded him as speaker. He was then appointed as Deputy Provincial Auditor, and he held this position until his death. He was succeeded in this role by Thomas Macfarlane.

Through the Auckland Harbour Board Act 1854, a Board of Commissioners was established. Powditch was one of the early chairmen of the Board of Commissioners.

Powditch died at the house of his son-in-law in Epsom. Until shortly before his death, he was of good health and of good mental capacity. He was buried at St Andrew's Epsom.
