= Isaac Featherston =

New Zealand politician and doctor (1813–1876)

The Honourable Isaac Earl Featherston NZC
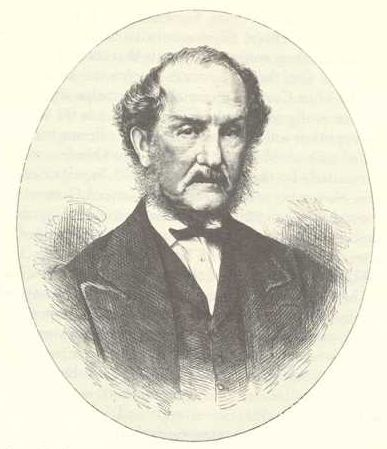
- I.E. Featherston, 1873

7th Colonial Secretary
- In office 12 July 1861 – 2 August 1861

Member of the New Zealand Parliament for Wanganui and Rangitikei
- In office 24 May 1854 – 9 August 1855

1st Superintendent of Wellington Province
- In office 2 July 1853 – 23 April 1858
- In office 28 June 1858 – 14 March 1870

Personal details
- Born: 21 March 1813
- Died: 19 June 1876 (aged 63)
- Spouse: Bethia Campbell Scott (m. 1839; died 1864)
- Relations: see Legacy

Isaac Earl Featherston NZC (21 March 1813 – 19 June 1876), popularly known as the Little Doctor, was a New Zealand politician, known for his advocacy for the establishment of New Zealand self-government, and the importance of the provincial governments.

== Biography ==
=== Early life and family ===
Featherston was born in Newcastle upon Tyne, Northumberland on 21 March 1813, to Thomas Featherston and Jane (Earl) Featherston. Although he spent a significant amount of time playing sports, specifically football, as a youngster he was also quite academic and qualified in medicine at the University of Edinburgh in 1836. On 10 December 1839, he married Bethia Campbell Scott (1816–1864), a daughter of Andrew Scott, of Edinburgh.

After working as a physician in Italy and across Europe, he emigrated to New Zealand due to problems with tuberculosis, leaving in December 1840 in hope of a cure in more suitable climate. He arrived in Wellington in May 1841 on the New Zealand Company ship Olympus as surgeon-superintendent.

=== Political career ===
New Zealand Parliament
Years	Term	Electorate	Party
1853–1855	1st	Wanganui and Rangitikei	Independent
1855–1858	2nd	Town of Wellington	Independent
1858–1860	2nd	Town of Wellington	Independent
1860–1866	3rd	City of Wellington	Independent
1866–1870	4th	City of Wellington	Independent

In 1845, Featherston became the first editor of the Wellington Independent. He served in the first, second, third, and fourth Parliaments. He represented the Wanganui and Rangitikei electorate in the first parliament until he resigned on 9 August 1855, and then represented the City of Wellington electorate in the second, third and fourth parliaments. In 1858, he resigned his seat in Parliament and his Wellington superintendency, apparently wanting to return to England. Instead, he successfully stood for re-election in both positions within months.

Featherston was Colonial Secretary (forerunner to the modern Minister of Internal Affairs) in 1861, and a Minister without Portfolio from 1869 to 1871, having been appointed in both instances by William Fox.

Featherston was also heavily involved in the politics of Wellington Province. He was elected unopposed as the first Superintendent from 1853. He resigned from this post on 23 April 1858. He was re-elected on 28 June 1858 and held the post until 1870. His superintendence oversaw some slow growth in Wellington before in 1865 it became the capital of the colony. From 1871 he was the first Agent-General for the colony in London, the precursor to the High Commissioner.

=== The Taranaki Wars ===
When war broke out in 1860, Featherston criticised the Government's handling of events, and lent his influence to tribal peacemaking and keeping much of Wellington Province out of the conflict. During the Second Taranaki War (1863–1866), Featherston raised auxiliaries of Māori, but they refused to fight unless he himself led them. Despite suffering from tuberculosis and at times being unable to sit on his horse, he indeed led them and accompanied Major General Trevor Chute on his west coast campaign and march to Mount Egmont. He led a Māori contingent in several engagements, notably at Otapawa, and later alongside Gustavus von Tempsky.

This saga gave rise to the Featherston legend: he was described leading his men into battle "in his dressing gown, with a cigar in his mouth, having no weapon whatever with which to defend himself". He was subsequently awarded the New Zealand Cross for bravery.

=== Wakefield–Featherston duel ===
A duel on 24 March 1847 was fought in Wellington between Colonel William Wakefield and Featherston over a newspaper editorial of Featherston on the New Zealand Company land policy which questioned Wakefield's honesty. Featherston fired and missed. Then Wakefield fired into the air, saying he would not shoot a man with seven daughters.

== Legacy ==
In his many escapades Featherston had acquired great mana. He also left a political legacy in his eight daughters. They included: Laetitia, who married James Menzies; Kate, who married John Cargill; Frances, who married William FitzGerald (son of James FitzGerald); Alice, who married Sir Charles Johnston; and Octavia, who married Alfred Newman.

He was described as 'a quiet man with a soft voice, who appreciated a joke.'

The town of Featherston in the Wairarapa is named after him, as are Featherston Street in Wellington and Featherston Street in Palmerston North.

== Citations ==
- Mennell, Philip (1892). "Featherston, Isaac Earl" . The Dictionary of Australasian Biography. London: Hutchinson & Co – via Wikisource.

Political offices
New office	Superintendent of Wellington Province; 1853–1858; 1858–1870	Succeeded by William Fitzherbert
Preceded by Edward Stafford	Colonial Secretary; 1861	Succeeded by William Fox
New Zealand Parliament
New constituency	Member of Parliament for Wanganui and Rangitikei; 1853–1855	Constituency abolished
Preceded by Robert Hart, James Kelham and Charles Clifford	Member of Parliament for Wellington; 1855–1870; Served alongside: Charles Clifford, William Waring Taylor, William Fitzherbert, William Barnard Rhodes and Charles Borlase	Succeeded by George Hunter, Edward Pearce
Diplomatic posts
New title	Agent-General of New Zealand in the United Kingdom; 1871–1876	Succeeded by Julius Vogel
