= Harry Powditch =

Australian rules footballer

Personal information
- Full name: Henry Thomas Powditch
- Born: 21 May 1894; Footscray, Victoria
- Died: 21 January 1963 (aged 68); Reservoir, Victoria
- Height: 168 cm (5 ft 6 in)

Playing career^{1}
Years	Club	Games (Goals)
1917–18	Fitzroy	2 (0)
1919–20	Northcote (VFA)	28 (16)
- ^{1} Playing statistics correct to the end of 1920.

Henry Thomas Powditch (21 May 1894 – 21 January 1963) was an Australian rules footballer who played with Fitzroy in the Victorian Football League (VFL).
