= Southern Division (New Zealand electorate) =

The Southern Division was a New Zealand parliamentary electorate in the Auckland Province from 1853 to 1860. It was a large two-member electorate south of the town of Auckland.

== Population centres ==
The New Zealand Constitution Act 1852, passed by the British government, allowed New Zealand to establish a representative government. The initial 24 New Zealand electorates were defined by Governor George Grey in March 1853. Southern Division was one of the initial two-member electorates.

Southern Division was a large electorate south of Auckland, extending to the southern boundary of the province and encompassing the Waikato, Coromandel, Bay of Plenty and East Cape. It bordered onto the Taranaki electorate Grey and Bell, and the 39th parallel south formed the boundary with the Wellington Province, where all land immediately south of this land was not incorporated into any electorate until 1858. When this unincorporated land was assigned to electorates that year, Southern Division had County of Hawke and Wanganui and Rangitikei as additional southern neighbours.

In the 1860 electoral redistribution, the House of Representatives increased the number of representatives by 12, reflecting the immense population growth since the original electorates were established in 1853. The redistribution created 15 additional electorates with between one and three members. The Southern Division electorate was abolished, and its area split for two new electorates, Franklin (two members) and Raglan (one member).

== History ==
The nomination meeting for the 1853 election was held in Onehunga immediately after the nomination meeting for the Pensioner Settlements electorate had finished. Three candidates were nominated, and the show of hands was declared to be in favour of Major Gray and Captain Powditch. Charles John Taylor demanded a poll, which was held one week later on Tuesday, 23 August 1853. Taylor received the highest number of votes, Gray came a close second, and Powditch as the third placed candidate was not elected.

Theodore Haultain contested a by-election on 8 May 1858 and was elected. He represented the electorate until the end of the term in 1860, when he was defeated for the Raglan electorate.

=== Members of Parliament ===
Key

Independent

Election	Winners	
1853 election	John Gray	Charles Taylor
1855 election	Robert Graham	Charles Taylor
1858 by-election	Robert Graham	Theodore Haultain
(Electorate abolished in 1860, see Franklin and Raglan)

== Election results ==
=== 1858 by-election ===
1858 Southern Division by-election
Party	Candidate	Votes	%	±%
Independent	Theodore Haultain	196	51.9	
Independent	David Graham	182	48.1	
Turnout		378		
Majority		14	3.7	

=== 1853 election ===
1853 general election: Southern Division
Party	Candidate	Votes	%	±%
Independent	Charles John Taylor	210	38.75	
Independent	John Gray	197	36.35	
Independent	William Powditch	135	24.91	
Majority		62 (Note: Majority is difference between lowest winning poll (Gray – 197) and highest losing poll (Powditch – 135).)	11.44	
Turnout		271 (Note: As electors had two votes each, turnout is assumed to be the sum of votes divided by two.)	43.36	
Registered electors		625		

Table footnotes:
