= Royal New Zealand Fencible Corps =

The Royal New Zealand Fencible Corps was formed in 1846, following the conclusion of the Northern War phase of the New Zealand Wars against Hone Heke. The Governor, George Grey, had requested military forces for the defence of the early settlers in New Zealand, and instead of supplying regular military forces the British parliament approved the creation of the Corps. Auckland, which had a population of 2,800 at the time, virtually doubled in size when the fencibles and their families disembarked.

== History ==
The term "fencible" is derived from defensible, and was used to describe regiments raised during the 1750s and 1760s (for the Seven Years' War), 1770s (for the American War of Independence), and the 1790s and onwards (for the French Revolutionary and Napoleonic Wars). Unlike regular British line regiments which could be posted anywhere, fencible regiments were raised for local defence and garrison duties and usually under their conditions for enlistment the men of a fencible corps could not be posted to other theatres.

The conditions for enlistment in the New Zealand Fencible were that soldiers of good character must have had 15 years of military service and have been under 48 years of age. Nearly all those recruited had extensive military action in India and Afghanistan. Most were married with several children. The conditions were posted at regiments throughout the United Kingdom. Many were Irishmen who had served in the British army but for whom life in Ireland was desperate due to the series of potato famines that regularly occurred throughout the 1840s. For married Irish soldiers the food, pay, offer of land and a cottage in New Zealand was a chance for a new life.

The pay was 6 pence to 1 shilling and 3 pence a day in addition to their pension. The Commandant (Major Kenny) was paid £300; each officer was given a house and 50 acres (20 ha) of land. The pensioners were to be provided with a prefabricated fencibles cottage of two rooms, on an acre of land. One of the few remaining cottages, albeit in an altered form, is on its original site at 34 Abercrombie St, Howick. This cottage was built with the help of Maori labour for Henry and Elizabeth Rowe and their surviving three children in 1848, after they arrived on the Sir George Seymour in November 1847. After seven years, the cottage and land would become their own property in exchange for the pensioner attending military exercises twelve days a year.

Ten ships brought 721 pensioner soldiers and their families, totalling over 2,500 people, between the years 1847 and 1852. The ships were the Ramillies, Minerva, Sir Robert Sale, Sir George Seymour, Clifton, Ann, Berhampore, Oriental Queen, Inchannan and Berwick Castle. The average age of the men was about 40. They settled in Howick, Onehunga, Otahuhu and Panmure. At Howick a redoubt was built on Stockade Hill, a prominent hill at the north end of the village's main street. The position, with its associated earthworks, is still there. In the 1849 census, one-third of Auckland's population were fencibles. About half were Anglican and half Catholic. Apart from working on their own plots, most men were engaged in building roads between the fencible settlements. The material used for road building was scoria from volcanic cones at Pigeon Mountain (then called Pigeon Tree Hill), Mount Richmond, and Mount Wellington.

They were first called to action in 1851 when a large party of about 350–450 Ngāti Pāoa from the Thames and Waiheke Island areas arrived at Auckland's Mechanics Bay in about 20 waka to attack the city. A British regiment at Albert Park Barracks was called out to the hill overlooking the bay. It was reinforced by fencibles who had come from Onehunga, the closest fencible town. Fencibles at Howick and Panmure were stood to in case of further trouble. The frigate HMS Fly trained its guns on the Maori war party from offshore. The cause of the aggression was the arrest of a Ngāti Pāoa chief who had stolen a shift from a shop in Shortland Street. The situation was defused when the attackers were given tobacco and blankets. Later Ngāti Pāoa sent a greenstone mere (club) to the governor.

A group of 121 Ngāti Mahuta under the great Waikato chief Te Wherowhero were also brought to South Auckland to defend the capital. They were given land at Māngere in 1849. They supplied their own arms but had British officers. The North Shore was guarded by a second Maori force led by Ngāpuhi chief Eruera Patuone who was given 110 acres (45 ha) at Waiwharariki, north of the Waitemata Harbour. He was under the control of a British officer.

During the 1863 Invasion of the Waikato about 75 military pensioners and their sons served in the Auckland Militia to defend Auckland.

== See also ==
- Theodore Haultain
- Pensioner Settlements (New Zealand electorate)
- Howick Historical Village
