= Robert Graham (New Zealand politician) =

New Zealand politician (1820–1885)

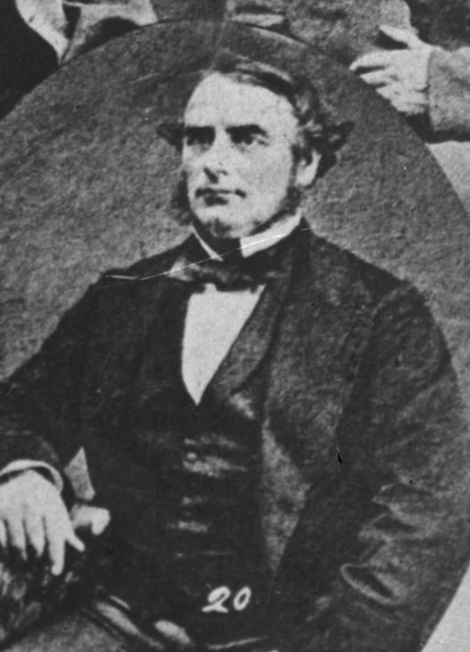
Graham in 1860

Robert Graham (15 May 1820 – 26 May 1885) was a 19th-century New Zealand politician in Auckland Province.

== Early life ==
Graham was born in 1820 in the parish of Barony in Glasgow, Scotland. His parents were Barbara Stirling Rennie and the farmer and coal merchant Robert Graham. His brother was David Graham.

Outside of politics Graham was involved in stock breeding in both Ellerslie and at Motutapu Island. He was also friends with Sir George Grey.

Graham was involved in the development of tourism at Waiwera, Rotorua, and Wairakei.

== Political career ==
New Zealand Parliament
Years	Term	Electorate	Party
1855–1860	2nd	Southern Division	Independent
1861–1864	3rd	Franklin	Independent
1866–1868	4th	Franklin	Independent

He represented the Southern Division electorate (containing Waikato, Coromandel, the Bay of Plenty, and East Cape) in the 2nd New Zealand Parliament from 1855 to 1860, and then represented the Franklin electorate in the 3rd Parliament and the 4th Parliament from 1861 to 1868, when he resigned.

He was the fifth Superintendent of Auckland from 1862 to 1865. Prior to this, he had represented the Southern Division electorate on the Provincial Council from 1855 to 1857, and he represented the Franklin electorate from 1865 to 1869. Graham was a major proponent of the Panmure Bridge, and formally laid the final cornerstone at a ceremony in October 1865, soon after stepping down as the Superintendent of Auckland.

He stood unsuccessfully for the 1877 by-election in City of Auckland West.

== Death and legacy ==
Graham died in Auckland on 26 May 1885. In 1999, he was posthumously inducted into the New Zealand Business Hall of Fame.

He has two great-grandsons who (as brothers) have both served as MPs:

- Doug Graham was a National MP from 1984 to 1999 and a cabinet minister
- Kennedy Graham was a Green Party MP from 2008 to 2017

Both Wenderholm and Ellerslie are named after homes owned by Graham.

== Notes ==
New Zealand Parliament
New constituency	Member of Parliament for Franklin; 1861–1866; Served alongside: Marmaduke Nixon, Theodore Haultain	Succeeded by William Turnbull Swan
Political offices
Preceded by John Williamson	Superintendent of Auckland Province; 1862–1865	Succeeded by Frederick Whitaker
