= Wanganui and Rangitikei =

Wanganui and Rangitikei was a parliamentary electorate that existed from 1853 to 1860, represented by two Members of Parliament.

== Population centres ==
The New Zealand Constitution Act 1852, passed by the British government, allowed New Zealand to establish a representative government. The initial 24 New Zealand electorates were defined by Governor George Grey in March 1853. Wanganui and Rangitikei was one of the initial single-member electorates. The electorate comprised two areas fronting onto the South Taranaki Bight: the area around the town of Wanganui, and a larger area further east stretching further inland along the Rangitikei River.

The Constitution Act also allowed the House of Representatives to establish new electorates and make changes to existing electorates, and this was first done through 'The Electoral Districts Act, 1858'. At that time, four new electorates were formed by splitting existing electorates, and the previously unincorporated land in the North Island was assigned to various electorates. The Wanganui and Rangitikei electorate gained a large area and for the first time, had boundaries with other electorates: Omata and Grey and Bell in the west, Southern Division along the 39th latitude in the north, County of Hawke in the east, and Wellington Country in the south.

In the 1860 electoral redistribution, the House of Representatives increased the number of representatives by 12, reflecting the immense population growth since the original electorates were established in 1853. The redistribution created 15 additional electorates with between one and three members, and Wanganui and Rangitikei was split into two separate electorates: the Rangitikei electorate and the Wanganui electorate.

== History ==
The Wanganui and Rangitikei electorate was formed for the 1853 election. Dr Isaac Featherston was the first representative; he had been elected unopposed. Featherston resigned on 9 August 1855, but this did not cause a by-election, as the next election was to be held later that year anyway.

The next representative was William Fox, who was also elected unopposed. Fox served until the end of the parliamentary term in 1860, when the electorate was abolished. Fox successfully contested the Rangitikei electorate in the 1861 election.

During that time, Wanganui and Rangitikei was represented by two Members of Parliament:

Key

Independent

Election	Winner
1853 election	Dr Isaac Featherston
1855 election	William Fox
(Electorate abolished in 1860, see Rangitikei and Wanganui)
