= Auckland Province =

- Former province
- Auckland Province within New Zealand
- Country: New Zealand
- Island: North Island
- Established: 1853
- Abolished: 1876
- Named for: Baron Auckland
- Seat: Auckland

The Auckland Province was a province of New Zealand from 1853 until the abolition of provincial government in 1876.

== Area ==
The province covered roughly half of the North Island of New Zealand. It was the largest of the six initial provinces, both by area and population. The southern boundary was mostly along the 39th latitude, which was an arbitrary line, as the country's interior was little known by Europeans. It was not subdivided during its existence; the Taranaki Province (originally named New Plymouth Province) was the only other that remained unchanged during its existence.

== History ==
The six original provinces were established in 1853. At that time, about 30,000 Europeans were living in New Zealand, a third of them in the Auckland Province. An estimated 70% of the Māori population was within the Auckland Province. Although the population of Otago Province (triggered by the Otago gold rush), and then also the Canterbury Province surpassed Auckland's, the northernmost area of the country became most populous again by 1901.

The provincial system was abolished in 1876. Auckland Province was from then used as an administrative district by the Department of Lands and Survey, but the area was later subdivided into the North Auckland, South Auckland, and Gisborne land districts. The 39th latitude was subsequently replaced by boundaries that took landforms into account, and as a consequence, parts of the former Auckland Province are now in the Wellington and Hawke's Bay land districts, and part of the former Wellington Province is in the South Auckland Land District.

== Anniversary Day ==
New Zealand law provides a public holiday for each province's anniversary day. Auckland Anniversary Day generally occurs in late January, on the Monday closest to 29 January, and is still observed throughout the historic province.

== Auckland Provincial Council ==
Auckland Provincial Council was the elected body of Auckland Province. From its second session onwards, the council used the General Assembly House for its meetings. It shared the use of this building with the New Zealand Parliament from 1854 until 1864 during the time that Auckland was the capital of New Zealand. From 1858, the province owned the building, but continued to make it available to parliament.

=== Superintendents ===
The Auckland Province had nine Superintendents:

No.	from	to	Superintendent
1	12 July 1853	5 January 1855	Robert Wynyard
2	15 March 1855	Nov 1855	William Brown
3	15 November 1855	17 September 1856	John Logan Campbell
4	11 November 1856	Dec 1862	John Williamson
5	11 December 1862	22 September 1865	Robert Graham
6	25 October 1865	2 March 1867	Frederick Whitaker
(4)	18 April 1867	Dec 1869	John Williamson (2nd time)
7	2 December 1869	Nov 1873	Thomas Gillies
(4)	20 November 1873	16 February 1875	John Williamson (3rd time)
8	Feb 1875	Mar 1875	Maurice O'Rorke
9	24 March 1875	1 January 1877	George Grey

=== Speakers ===
The Provincial Council had three Speakers:

No.	from	to	Speaker
1	1853	1857	Thomas Bartley
2	1857	1865	William Powditch
3	1865	1876	Maurice O'Rorke

=== Members ===
In 1853 the province had 6 electorates, with 24 members:

- City of Auckland, 6 members
- Suburbs of Auckland, 4 members
- Pensioner Settlements, 4 members
- Northern Division, 4 members
- Southern Division, 4 members
- Bay of Islands, 2 members

For its last session of 1873–76, it had 43 members:

- Albertland: John Shepherd
- Auckland East: William John Hurst, Joseph Dargaville, Philip Aaron Philips
- Auckland West: James Thomas Boylan, Patrick Dignan, David Goldie, Frederick Prime, William Swanson
- Bay of Islands: Hugh Carleton
- Coromandel: Alfred Cadman
- Eden: Andrew Beveridge, William Buckland
- Hokianga: John Sheehan
- Kaipara: Henry Lloyd
- Mangonui: William Thomas Ball
- Newton: Rev. Thomas Cheeseman, Thomas Macready
- Onehunga: John Lundon, Maurice O'Rorke
- Opotiki: William Kelly
- Otamatea: Murdoch McLeod
- Pakuranga: Ponsonby John Raleigh Peacocke
- Papakura: William Hay
- Parnell: Benjamin Tonks, Reader Wood
- Raglan: Thomas Wilson
- Ramarama: Joseph Crispe
- Takapuna: George McCullagh Reed
- Tamaki: Robert Nair Ryburn
- Tauranga: George Morris
- Thames: Lemuel Bagnall, John Brown, William Carpenter, William Turnbull Swan, (Note: Swan died on 15 March 1875) William Davies (Note: Davies replaced Swan in a by-election held on 5 April 1875)
- Turanganui: James Woodbine Johnson
- Waikato: William Australia Graham
- Waipa: Henry Byron, Hungerford Roche
- Wairoa and Mangapai: William Ormiston
- Waitemata: Allan Kerr Taylor
- Waiuku: Ebenezer Hamlin
- Warkworth: William Pollock Moat
- Whangarei: Robert Douglas

=== Legislation ===
- Auckland Provincial Ordinances 1854–1875
- Public Buildings Act 1875
