= Wellington Province =

Coordinates: 41°17′S 174°46′E

Wellington
- Provinces of New Zealand
- Wellington Province as from 1853 to 1858
- Country: New Zealand
- Island: North Island
- Established: 1853
- Abolished: 1876
- Named for: Wellington city
- Seat: Wellington

Wellington Province, governed by the Wellington Provincial Council, was one of the provinces of New Zealand from 1853 until the abolition of provincial government in 1876. It covered much of the southern half of the North Island until November 1858, when Hawke's Bay Province split off, taking about a third of its area.

== Territory ==
Wellington Province originally covered much of the southern half of the North Island. Its northern boundary was drawn arbitrarily across most of the middle of the island at latitude 39° south to the east coast, just including the entirety of Hawke Bay. North of that line was Auckland Province. The straight-line boundary did not extend right to the west coast, but dipped south to the coast just west of Waverley and short of Pātea, allowing for New Plymouth Province (later renamed Taranaki Province) to the west.

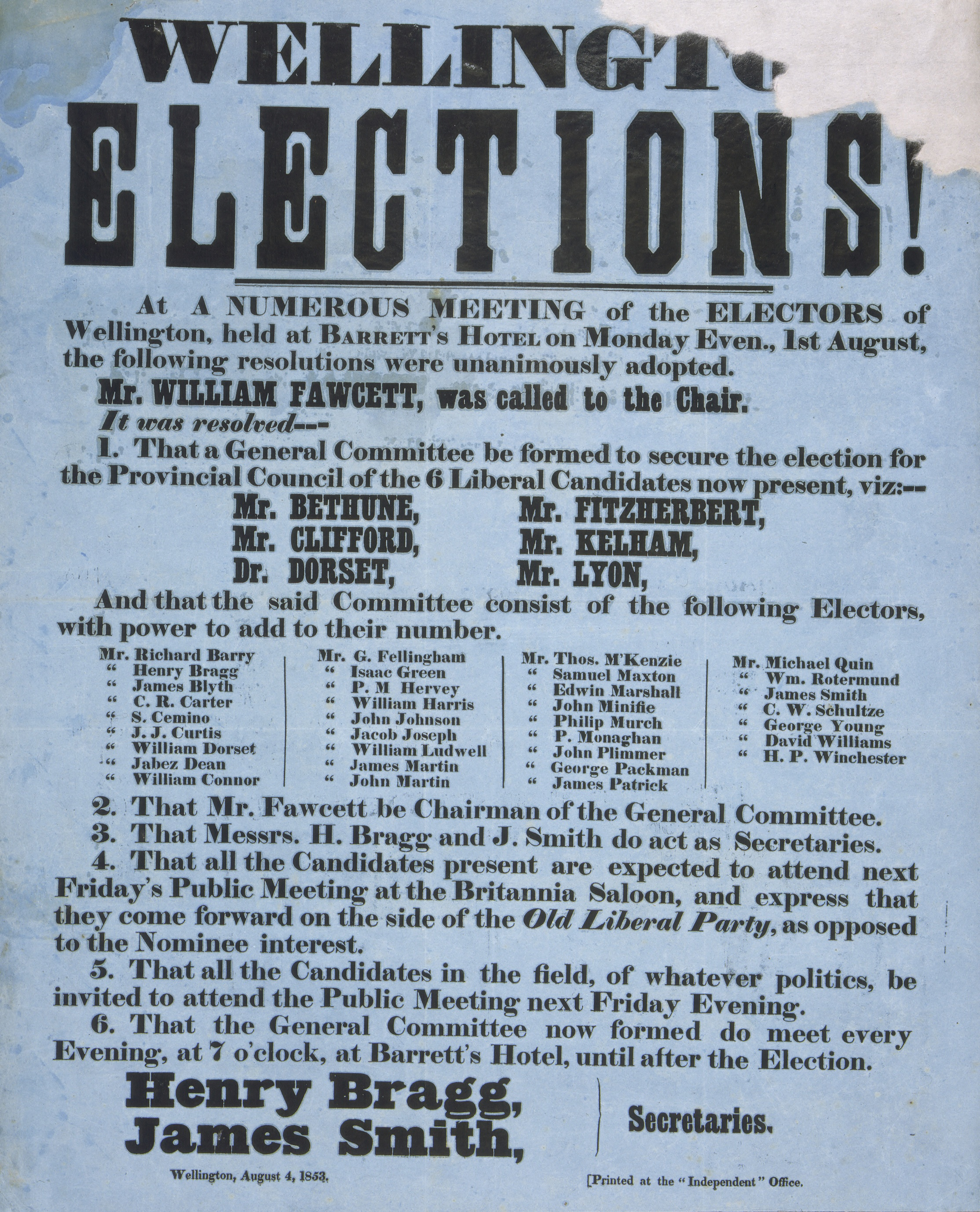
Poster for the Wellington Provincial Council elections in 1853

From November 1858 to 1876

Hawke's Bay settlers broke away to form Hawke's Bay Province on 1 November 1858. Wellington Province's new eastern boundary followed the main divide of the eastern ranges, and cut across from just south of Woodville to the east coast near Cape Turnagain. Thus Wellington lost about a third of its area, leaving it with a territory roughly the same as the combined present-day Manawatū-Whanganui and Wellington regions.

The latter Wellington provincial boundaries include four of New Zealand's main urban areas: Wellington, Palmerston North, Whanganui and Kāpiti. Other large towns are Feilding, Levin and Masterton. According to Statistics New Zealand figures at the 2001 census 626,000 people lived within the provincial boundaries.

== European settlement ==
European settlement in what became Wellington Province started at Port Nicholson (now called Wellington Harbour) and at Whanganui in 1840. Settlement in Hawke's Bay started a decade later, around 1850.

== Superintendents ==
Wellington Province had two successive superintendents.

No.	From	To	Superintendent
1	2 July 1853	14 March 1870	Isaac Featherston
2	28 April 1871	1 Jan 1877	William Fitzherbert

== Legislation ==
The only two acts of the provincial assembly still in effect are the Manawatu Racecourse Act 1869 and the Wanganui And Rangitikei Racecourses Act 1862.

== Anniversary Day ==
New Zealand law provides an anniversary day for each province. Wellington Anniversary Day is the Monday that falls closest to 22 January and is observed as a public holiday within the old provincial boundaries.

== See also ==
- 1853 New Zealand provincial elections
