= Daldy =

Origin
- Region of origin: United Kingdom

Daldy is a British surname, now more common in Australia and New Zealand. It may refer to:

- Alfred Daldy (1865–1935), British archdeacon
- Amey Daldy (1829–1920), New Zealand suffragist
- Vicki Daldy (born 1966), Australian basketball player
- William Daldy (1816–1903), New Zealand politician

== See also ==
- Dalby (disambiguation)
- William C Daldy, a steam engine tugboat operating in New Zealand
