= Archibald Clark (politician) =

New Zealand politician

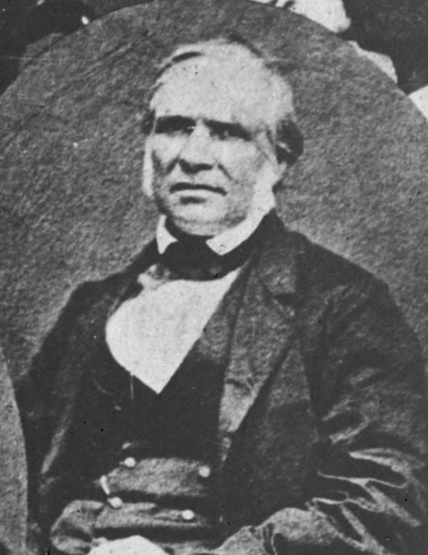
- Archibald Clark in 1860

1st Mayor of the Auckland Borough Council
- In office 1851–1852
- Preceded by: new office
- Succeeded by: office abolished

Member of the New Zealand Parliament for City of Auckland
- In office 5 April 1860 – 5 November 1860

Member of the New Zealand Parliament for Auckland East
- In office 1866–1870
- Preceded by: Thomas Russell
- Succeeded by: Julius Vogel

Member of the New Zealand Parliament for Franklin
- In office 1871–1874

Personal details
- Born: 1805 Beith, Scotland
- Died: 17 October 1875 Remuera, Auckland, New Zealand
- Party: Independent

Archibald Clark (1805 – 17 October 1875) was a Scottish 19th-century Member of Parliament in the Auckland Region, New Zealand. He was the first Mayor of Auckland in 1851. His company, Archibald Clark and Sons, manufactured clothing and was a wholesaler.

== Early life ==
Clark was born in Beith, Scotland, in 1805, the son of Andrew Clark. He attended the University of Glasgow to become a Presbyterian minister, but returned home to take over his ill father's business before completing his studies. His first wife was Margaret McCosh, the daughter of a wealthy coal mine owner. Their eldest son, James Clark, was born in 1833 in Beith and became a mayor of Auckland (1880–1883). Clark decided to emigrate and they left London on the barque Thames on 18 July 1849, and arrived in Auckland with his third wife and four children on 25 November. Clark and his family were some of the earliest European settlers of Remuera.

== Professional career ==
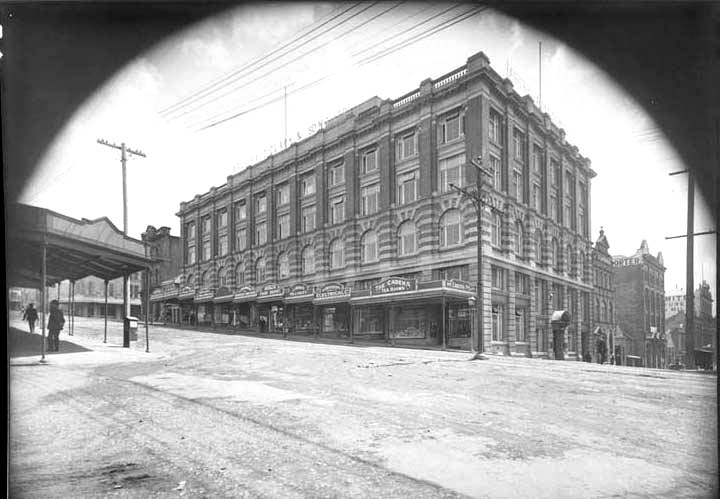
Archibald Clark and Sons Ltd in Wellesley Street West in 1912

Clark established a drapery store in Shortland Street in 1850 and initially imported, but later manufactured clothing. In 1856 or 1857, his son James became a partner in the business, which became known as Archibald Clark and Sons. The company became quite large, at one time having 500 employees. Their building on the corner of Wellesley Street West and Elliott Street in the Auckland CBD, built in 1910, is registered with Heritage New Zealand as a Category II heritage structure. The company ceased trading in 1928.

== Political career ==
New Zealand Parliament
Years	Term	Electorate	Party
1860	2nd	City of Auckland	Independent
1866–1870	4th	Auckland East	Independent
1871–1874	5th	Franklin	Independent

In 1851, local government was inaugurated in Auckland with the establishment of the Borough of Auckland. Clark was elected as the inaugural and only mayor of the borough council, serving in 1851–1852. However the legality of Auckland's elevation as a borough was legally contested and overturned. Auckland was placed under the care of a board of governors, whose chairman was Archibald Clark. He was succeeded by Walter Lee, who was chairman in 1852–1854. It was not until 1871, that Auckland was formally incorporated and Philip Philips was elected as the first mayor of the city council (by the other city councillors and not by popular vote).

He represented the City of Auckland electorate in 1860, until he was defeated (for the Newton electorate). He then represented Auckland East from 1866 to 1870, and Franklin from 1871 to 1874, when he resigned due to failing health.

Clark was also a member of the Auckland Provincial Council, representing the Auckland East electorate in the 5th Council from January 1867 to November 1868.

== Private life and death ==
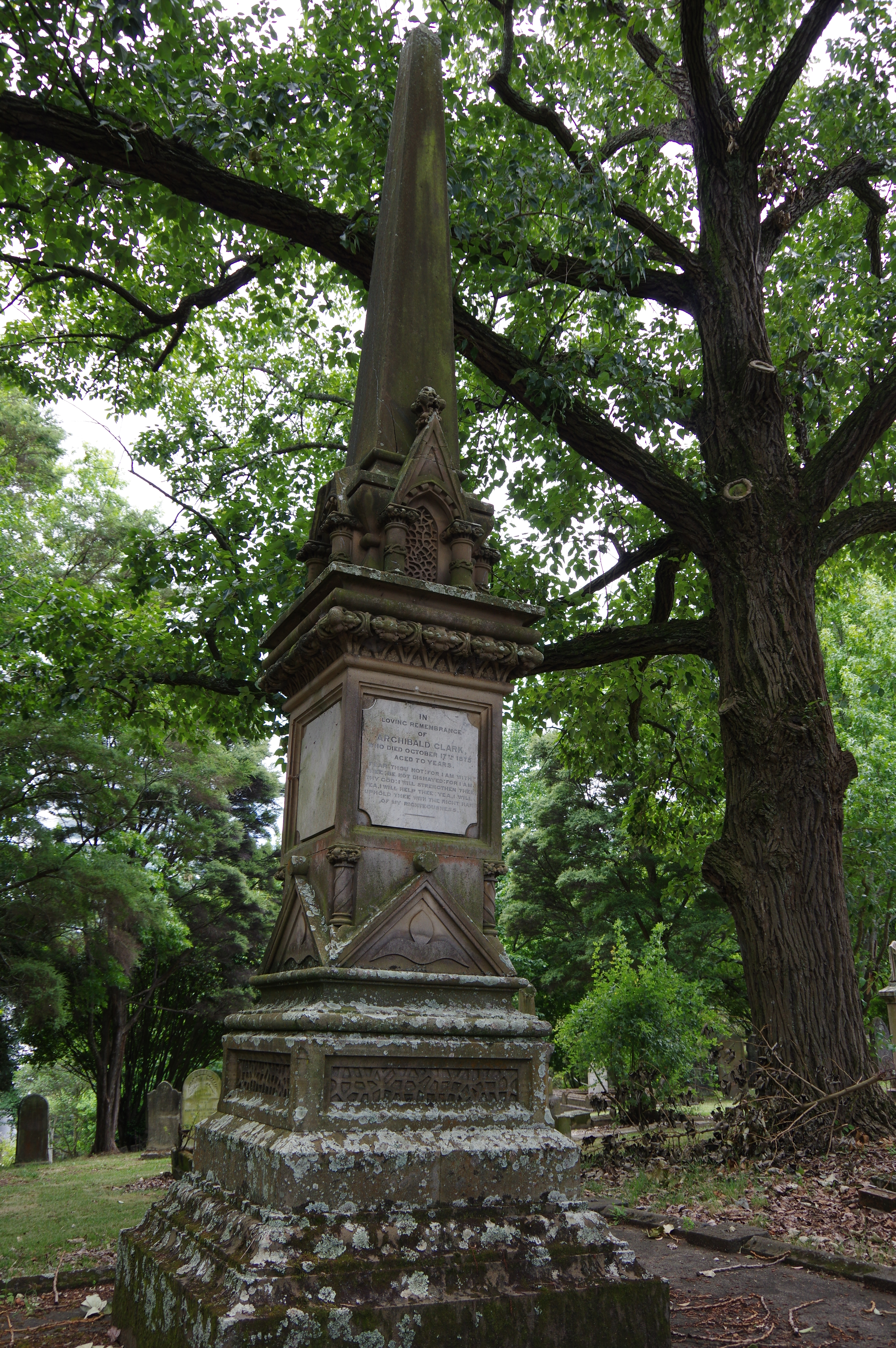
Archibald Clark's grave in Symonds Street Cemetery, Auckland

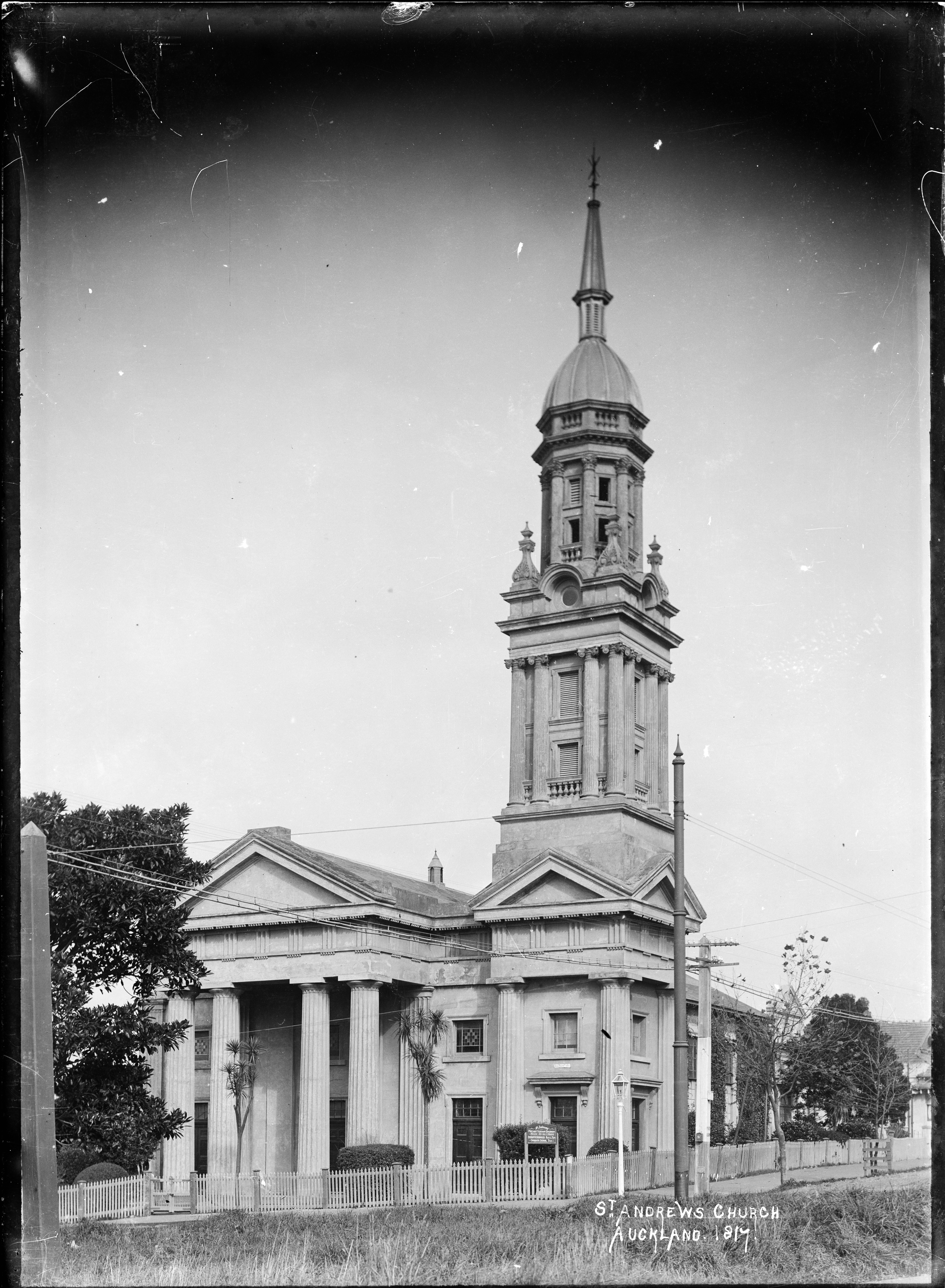
St Andrew's Presbyterian Church, Auckland

Clark read widely, an interest that he obtained during his time at university. He was well liked by his friends, and was regarded by all for his integrity and conduct. He was active in St Andrew's Church and was one of the leading members of the congregation. The church is the oldest surviving church building in Auckland as of 2015, and registered with Heritage New Zealand as a Category I heritage building.

Clark died on 17 October 1875 at his residence in Remuera. For almost two years, he had not participated in public life due to failing health.

He was buried three days later at Symonds Street Cemetery.

His daughter-in-law, Kate Emma McCosh Clark (wife of James McCosh Clark), wrote the first New Zealand children's story A southern cross fairy tale, which she partly illustrated, published in London in 1891.

Political offices
First	Mayor of Auckland Borough; 1851–1852	Office abolished
New Zealand Parliament
Preceded by Thomas Beckham, William Daldy, Thomas Forsaith	Member of Parliament for Auckland; 1860; Served alongside: William Daldy, Thomas Forsaith	In abeyance Title next held by William Rees, John Shera, Thomas Thompson
Preceded by Thomas Russell	Member of Parliament for Auckland East; 1866–1870	Succeeded by Julius Vogel
Preceded by William Swan, Theodore Haultain	Member of Parliament for Franklin; 1871–1874; Served alongside: William Buckland	Succeeded by William Buckland, Joseph May
