= 2nd New Zealand Parliament =

Term of the Parliament of New Zealand

2nd Parliament of New Zealand
←	1st Parliament	3rd Parliament	→

Overview
- Legislative body: New Zealand Parliament
- Term: 15 April 1856 – 5 November 1860
- Election: 1855 New Zealand general election
- Government: Sewell ministry (until 1856); First Fox ministry (1856); First Stafford ministry (from 1856)

House of Representatives
- Members: 37
- Speaker of the House: Sir Charles Clifford
- Colonial Secretary: Edward Stafford — from 2 June 1856; William Fox — 20 May – 2 June 1856; Henry Sewell — until 20 May 1856

Legislative Council
- Members: 13 (at start); 19 (at end)
- Speaker of the Council: Thomas Bartley — Frederick Whitaker until 12 May 1856

Sovereign
- Monarch: HM Queen Victoria
- Governor: HE Rt. Hon Colonel Thomas Browne

The 2nd New Zealand Parliament was a term of the Parliament of New Zealand. It opened on 15 April 1856, following New Zealand's 1855 election. It was dissolved on 5 November 1860 in preparation for 1860–61 election. The 2nd Parliament was the first under which New Zealand had responsible government, meaning that unlike previously, the Cabinet was chosen (although not officially appointed) by Parliament rather than by the Governor-General of New Zealand.

== Historical context ==
At this time political parties had not been established (they were not established until after the 1890 election), meaning that anyone attempting to form an administration had to win support directly from individual MPs. This made forming (and retaining) a government difficult. The Sewell Ministry, the first responsible government, led by Henry Sewell, lasted only two weeks. The first Fox Ministry, the second responsible government, led by William Fox, also lasted only two weeks. The third responsible government, the first Stafford Ministry, led by Edward Stafford, was more stable, governing for the remainder of the 2nd Parliament and for the beginning of the 3rd.

== Parliamentary sessions ==
Parliament sat for three sessions:

Session	from	to
First	15 Apr 1856	16 Aug 1856
Second	10 Aug 1858	21 Aug 1858
Third	30 Jul 1860	5 Nov 1860

== Electoral boundaries for the 2nd Parliament ==
The 2nd Parliament, which initially used the same electoral boundaries as the 1st Parliament, consisted of thirty-seven representatives representing twenty-four electorates. Two regions of the colony (the inland regions of the lower North Island and the north-west corner of the South Island) were not part of any electorate, and so were not represented.

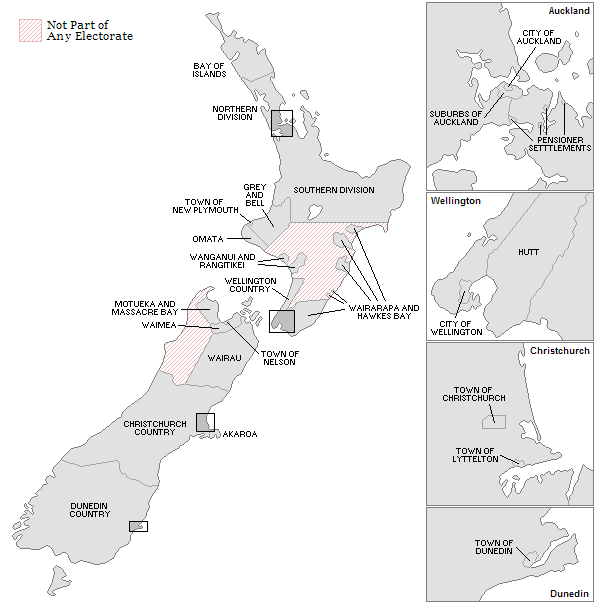

The New Zealand Constitution Act 1852 allowed the General Assembly to add or alter electorates whenever this was desired, and this was first done in 1858 as described below. The amendment changed the boundaries to some electorates and supplementary elections were held the following year—held between 7 November and 18 December 1859—to fill vacancies.

== Initial composition of the 2nd Parliament ==
Member	Electorate	Province	MP's term	Election date
John Cuff	Akaroa	Canterbury	First	28 December
John Logan Campbell	City of Auckland	Auckland	First	27 October
Thomas Beckham	City of Auckland	Auckland	First	27 October
William Daldy	City of Auckland	Auckland	First	27 October
Frederick Merriman	Auckland Suburbs	Auckland	Second	27 October
Walter Brodie	Auckland Suburbs	Auckland	First	27 October
Hugh Carleton	Bay of Islands	Auckland	Second	24 November
Dingley Brittin	Christchurch Country	Canterbury	First	20 December
John Hall	Christchurch Country	Canterbury	First	20 December
Henry Sewell	Town of Christchurch	Canterbury	Second	18 December
John Cargill	Dunedin Country	Otago	Second	11 December
William Cargill	Dunedin Country	Otago	First	11 December
James Macandrew	Town of Dunedin	Otago	Second	11 December
Charles Brown	Grey and Bell	New Plymouth	First	8 November
Alfred Ludlam	Hutt	Wellington	Second	16 November
Dillon Bell	Hutt	Wellington	First	16 November
James FitzGerald	Town of Lyttelton	Canterbury	Second	21 December
Charles Parker	Motueka and Massacre Bay	Nelson	First	8 November
Alfred Domett	Town of Nelson	Nelson	First	12 November
Edward Stafford	Town of Nelson	Nelson	First	12 November
William Richmond	Town of New Plymouth	New Plymouth	First	5 November
Thomas Henderson	Northern Division	Auckland	First	27 October
Walter Lee	Northern Division	Auckland	Second	27 October
Alfred East	Omata	New Plymouth	First	10 November
John Williamson	Pensioner Settlements	Auckland	First	27 October
Joseph Greenwood	Pensioner Settlements	Auckland	Second	27 October
Charles Taylor	Southern Division	Auckland	Second	26 October
Robert Graham	Southern Division	Auckland	First	26 October
Charles Elliott	Waimea	Nelson	First	5 November
William Travers	Waimea	Nelson	Second	5 November
John Smith	Wairarapa and Hawke's Bay	Wellington	First	26 November
William Wells	Wairau	Nelson	First	19 November
William Fox	Wanganui and Rangitikei	Wellington	First	27 November
Charles Clifford	City of Wellington	Wellington	Second	13 November
Isaac Featherston	City of Wellington	Wellington	Second	13 November
William Fitzherbert	City of Wellington	Wellington	First	13 November
Dudley Ward	Wellington Country	Wellington	First	15 November

== Changes during term ==
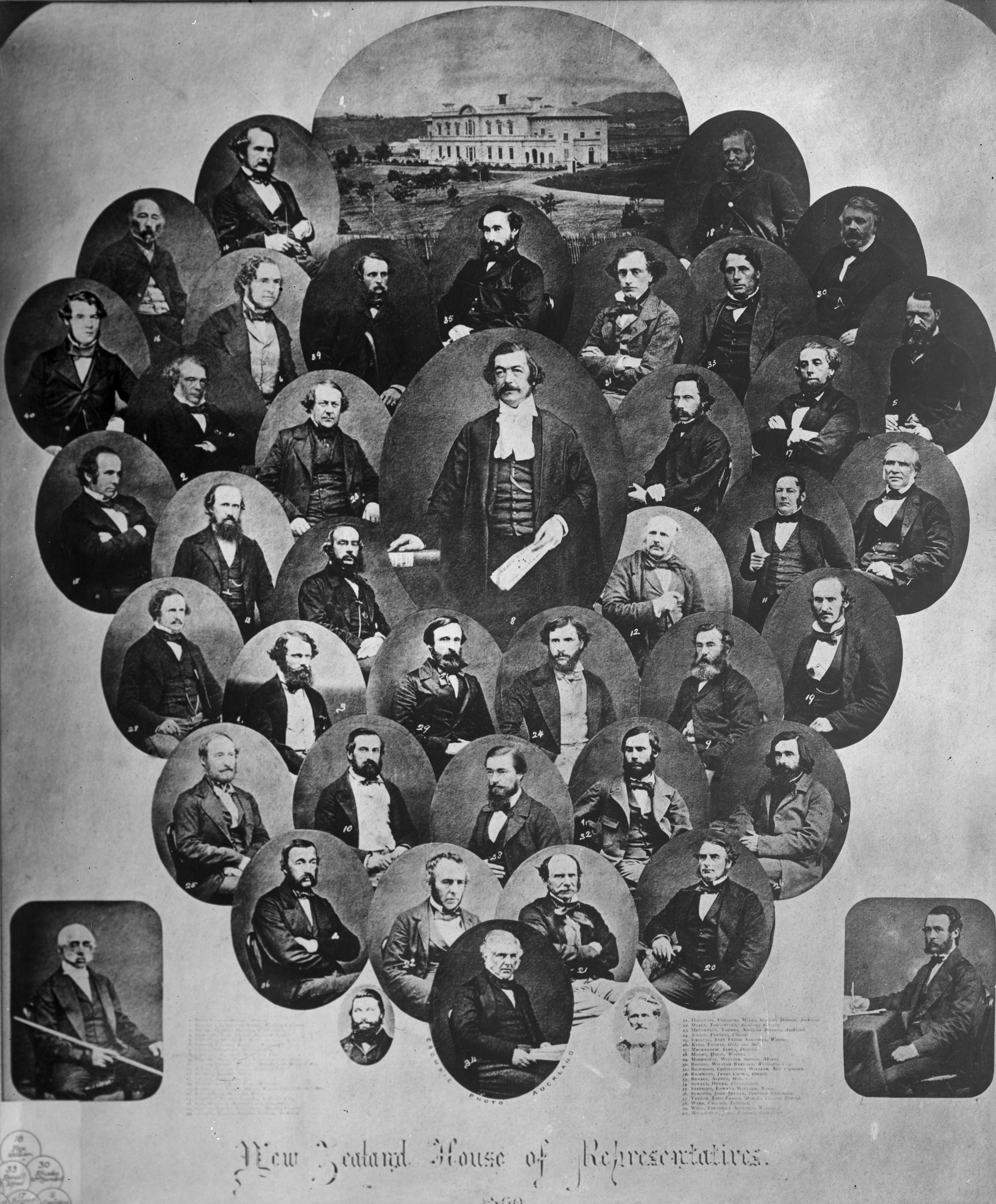
Montage of portraits depicting members of the New Zealand House of Representatives, the Sergeant-at-Arms, and the Clerk of the House, during the Second Parliament in 1860. Government House, Auckland, is at the top. This is the first photo taken of the New Zealand Parliament.

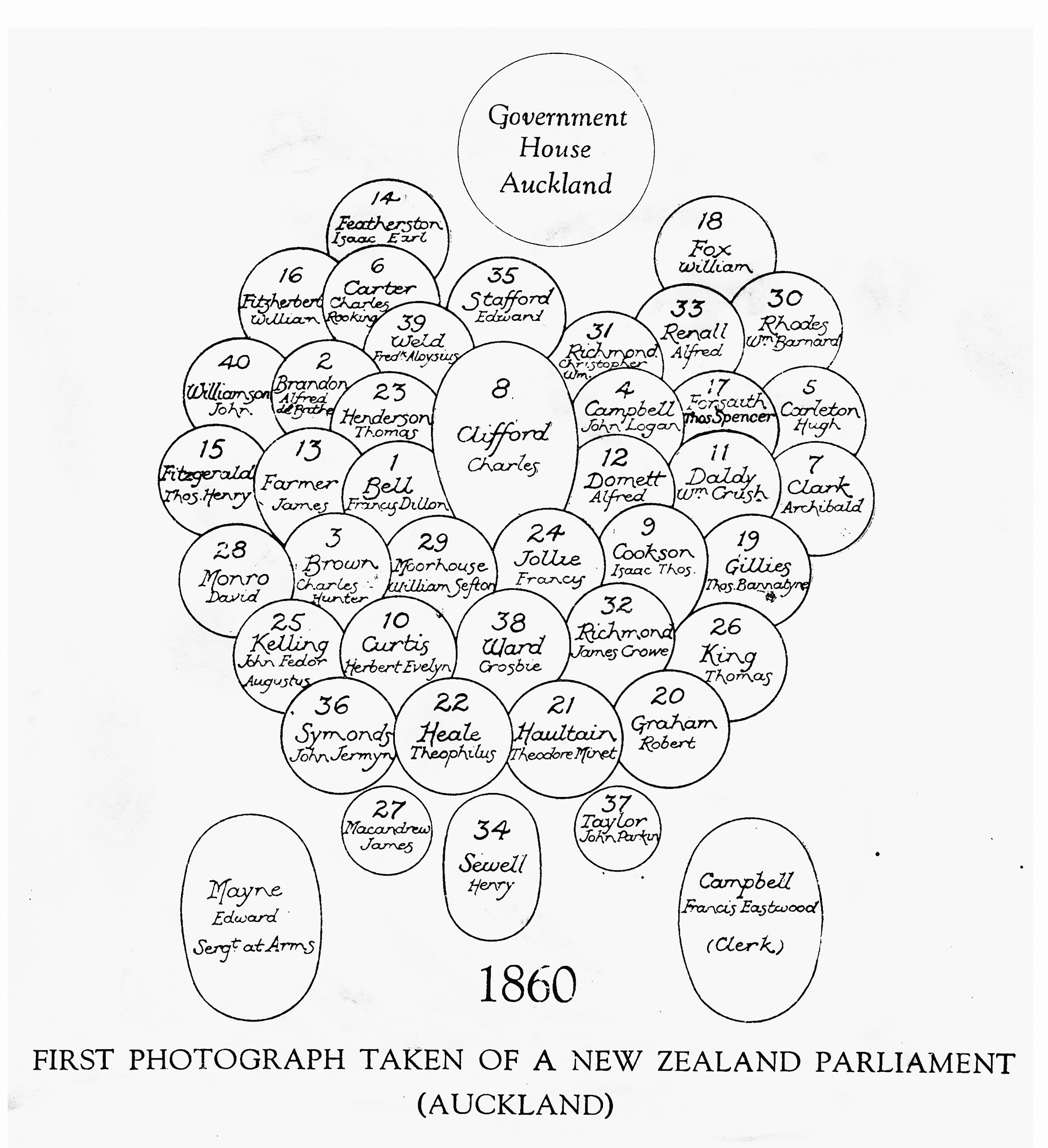
The key that goes with the montage of portraits.

The turnover of MPs was very high in the 2nd Parliament, with 32 by-elections and a supplementary election being held. This situation was partly the result of a redistribution of boundaries to seven electorates, and the creation of four new electorates – agreed upon in the Electoral Districts Act, 1858, with the total number of MPs in Parliament rising from 37 to 41, and the number of electorates rising from 24 to 28. The electorates Bay of Islands and Northern Division were combined and then redivided, with Marsden resulting as a new electorate. The Wairarapa and Hawke's Bay electorate was split into two separate components, Wairarapa and County of Hawke. All the previously unincorporated areas in the lower North Island were divided between Wairarapa, County of Hawke, Wanganui and Rangitikei, and Wellington Country.

In the South Island, the southern portion of Wairau electorate, plus part of Christchurch Country, became the new Cheviot electorate. The western portion of Dunedin Country was split off and became the new Wallace electorate. The northwest of the South Island remained the colony's only territory not part of an electorate.

Members of Parliament belonging to one of the electorates that was split could choose which of the two new electorates they would want to represent, and by-elections were held during 1859 in the thus unrepresented electorates.

At the opening of the 6th session of the Parliament on 10 April 1858, the speaker read out 14 resignations.

By-election	Electorate	Date	Incumbent	Reason	Winner
1856	Motueka and Massacre Bay	17 May	Charles Parker	Resignation	Herbert Curtis
1856	Christchurch Country	14 October	Dingley Brittin	Resignation	John Ollivier
1856	Grey and Bell	14 October	Charles Brown	Resignation	John Lewthwaite
1856	Town of Christchurch	18 November	Henry Sewell	Resignation	Richard Packer
1856	Hutt	27 November	Alfred Ludlam	Resignation	Samuel Revans
1858	City of Auckland	27 April	John Logan Campbell	Resignation	Thomas Forsaith
1858	Pensioner Settlements	29 April	Joseph Greenwood	Resignation	Jermyn Symonds
1858	Southern Division	8 May	Charles Taylor	Resignation	Theodore Haultain
1858	Grey and Bell	17 May	John Lewthwaite	Resignation	Charles Brown
1858	Waimea	21 May	Charles Elliott	Resignation	David Monro
1858	Wairau	21 May	William Wells	Resignation	Frederick Weld
1858	Town of Lyttelton	28 May	James FitzGerald	Resignation	Crosbie Ward
1858	Akaroa	31 May	John Cuff	Resignation	William Moorhouse
1858	Dunedin Country	16 June	John Cargill	Resignation	John Taylor
1858	Wairarapa and Hawke's Bay	22 July	J. Valentine Smith	Resignation	James Ferguson
1858	City of Wellington	27 July	Isaac Featherston; William Fitzherbert	Resignations	Isaac Featherston; William Rhodes
1858	Wellington Country	29 July	Dudley Ward	Resignation	Alfred Brandon
1858	Hutt	31 July	Dillon Bell; Samuel Revans	Resignations	Alfred Renall; William Fitzherbert
1859	Town of Dunedin	14 January	James Macandrew	Resignation	James Macandrew
==== Supplementary election, 1859 ====
Cheviot		18 December			Edward Jollie
Marsden		29 November			James Farmer
Wairarapa		7 November			Charles Carter
Wallace		30 November			Dillon Bell
By-election	Electorate	Date	Incumbent	Reason	Winner
==== 2nd Parliament (continued) ====
1859	Waimea	26 December	William Travers	Resignation	Fedor Kelling
1860	Town of Christchurch	18 January	Richard Packer	Resignation	Henry Sewell
1860 (1st)	Suburbs of Auckland	25 January	Walter Brodie	Resignation	Theophilus Heale
1860	Dunedin Country	28 March	William Cargill	Resignation	Thomas Gillies
1860 (1st)	Christchurch Country	2 April	John Ollivier	Resignation	Isaac Cookson
1860	City of Auckland	5 April	Thomas Beckham	Resignation	Archibald Clark
1860 (2nd)	Suburbs of Auckland	5 April	Frederick Merriman	Resignation	Joseph Hargreaves
1860	Omata	16 April	Alfred East	Resignation	James Richmond
1860 (2nd)	Christchurch Country	21 April	John Hall	Resignation	Charles Hunter Brown
1860	County of Hawke	26 April	James Ferguson	Resignation	Thomas Fitzgerald
1860	Northern Division	23 May	Thomas Henderson	Resignation	Thomas Henderson
1860	Grey and Bell	28 May	Charles Brown	Resignation	Thomas King
1860 (3rd)	Suburbs of Auckland	4 August	Joseph Hargreaves	Resignation	John Logan Campbell

=== Existing electorates ===
Akaroa

Cuff resigned on 12 January 1858 and was succeeded by William Sefton Moorhouse.

Auckland Suburbs

Merriman resigned on 13 March 1860. He was succeeded by Joseph Hargreaves, who was elected on 5 April 1860, and resigned on 24 July 1860. Hargreaves was replaced by John Logan Campbell, who was returned unopposed on 4 August 1860.

Brodie resigned on 6 December 1859 and was succeeded by Theophilus Heale.

Christchurch Country

Brittin resigned on 7 July 1856, returned to England on 'urgent business' and did not return to New Zealand. He was succeeded in 1856 by John Ollivier, who himself resigned on 21 January 1860. Ollivier was succeeded by Isaac Cookson.

Hall resigned on 10 March 1860 and was succeeded by Charles Hunter Brown.

City of Auckland

Campbell resigned on 19 November 1856. He was succeeded by Thomas Forsaith.

Beckham resigned on 31 May 1859. He was succeeded by Archibald Clark.

City of Wellington

Fitzherbert resigned on 17 March 1858, and Featherston resigned on 24 March 1858. Featherston apparently wanted to return to England. Instead, he successfully stood for re-election within months. The other person returned in the same by-election was William Barnard Rhodes.

County of Hawke

The renamed County of Hawke (it had previously been Wairarapa and Hawke's Bay, until its southern portion was made into the separate electorate of Wairarapa). Thomas Henry Fitzgerald was elected as its representative on 26 April 1860.

Dunedin Country

John and his father William Cargill resigned on 5 March 1858 and 16 December 1859, respectively. The first vacancy was filled by John Parkin Taylor, who retired from parliament at the end of this term. The second vacancy was filled by Thomas Gillies.

Grey and Bell

Brown resigned on 14 August 1856 to (unsuccessfully) contest the Taranaki superintendency. He was again elected in 1858 and resigned in 1860, when his militia service required his full attention. In between Brown's terms, John Lewthwaite (who resigned in 1858) represented the electorate.

Hutt

Bell resigned in 1858 and was succeeded by William Fitzherbert. Ludlam, the other representative of Hutt, resigned in 1856 and was replaced by Samuel Revans, who resigned again on 22 March 1858 and was succeeded by Alfred Renall.

Motueka and Massacre Bay

Parker resigned in 1856 and was succeeded by Herbert Curtis.

Omata

East resigned in 1860. The subsequent by-election on 16 April 1860 was won unopposed by James Crowe Richmond.

Pensioner Settlements

Greenwood resigned and Captain Jermyn Symonds was elected on 30 April 1858.

Southern Division

Taylor resigned on 13 April 1858 and was succeeded through an 1858 by-election by Theodore Haultain.

Town of Christchurch

Sewell resigned his seat in late 1856 to return to England. He was succeeded by Richard Packer. Packer resigned in 1859. Sewell, having returned from England, won the 1860 by-election. He did not seek re-election at the end of the term, but was appointed Registrar-General of Lands towards the end of 1860.

Town of Dunedin

Macandrew resigned on 2 November 1858. He successfully contested the January 1859 by-election in the same electorate.

Town of Lyttelton

FitzGerald] resigned in 1857 due to ill health. Crosbie Ward won the resulting by-election in May 1858.

Waimea

Elliot resigned in 1858. He was succeeded by David Monro, who had already represented the electorate in the 1st Parliament.

Travers resigned in 1859 and was succeeded by Fedor Kelling.

Wairarapa and Hawke's Bay

Smith resigned on 10 March 1858. He was succeeded by James Burne Ferguson.

Wairau

Wells resigned in 1858. He was succeeded by Frederick Weld, who had already represented the electorate in the 1st Parliament.

Wellington Country

Ward resigned on 22 March 1858. He was succeeded by Alfred Brandon.

=== New electorates ===
Cheviot

Cheviot was first created in 1859, with Edward Jollie its first representative.

Marsden

Marsden was established in 1859. James Farmer was the first representative, elected on 16 December 1859.

Wairarapa

The Wairarapa electorate was created in 1859. Charles Carter was the first elected representative.

Wallace

The Wallace electorate was created in 1859 and the first elections held on 30 November. Dillon Bell was the first elected representative.
