= Thomas Forsaith =

New Zealand politician

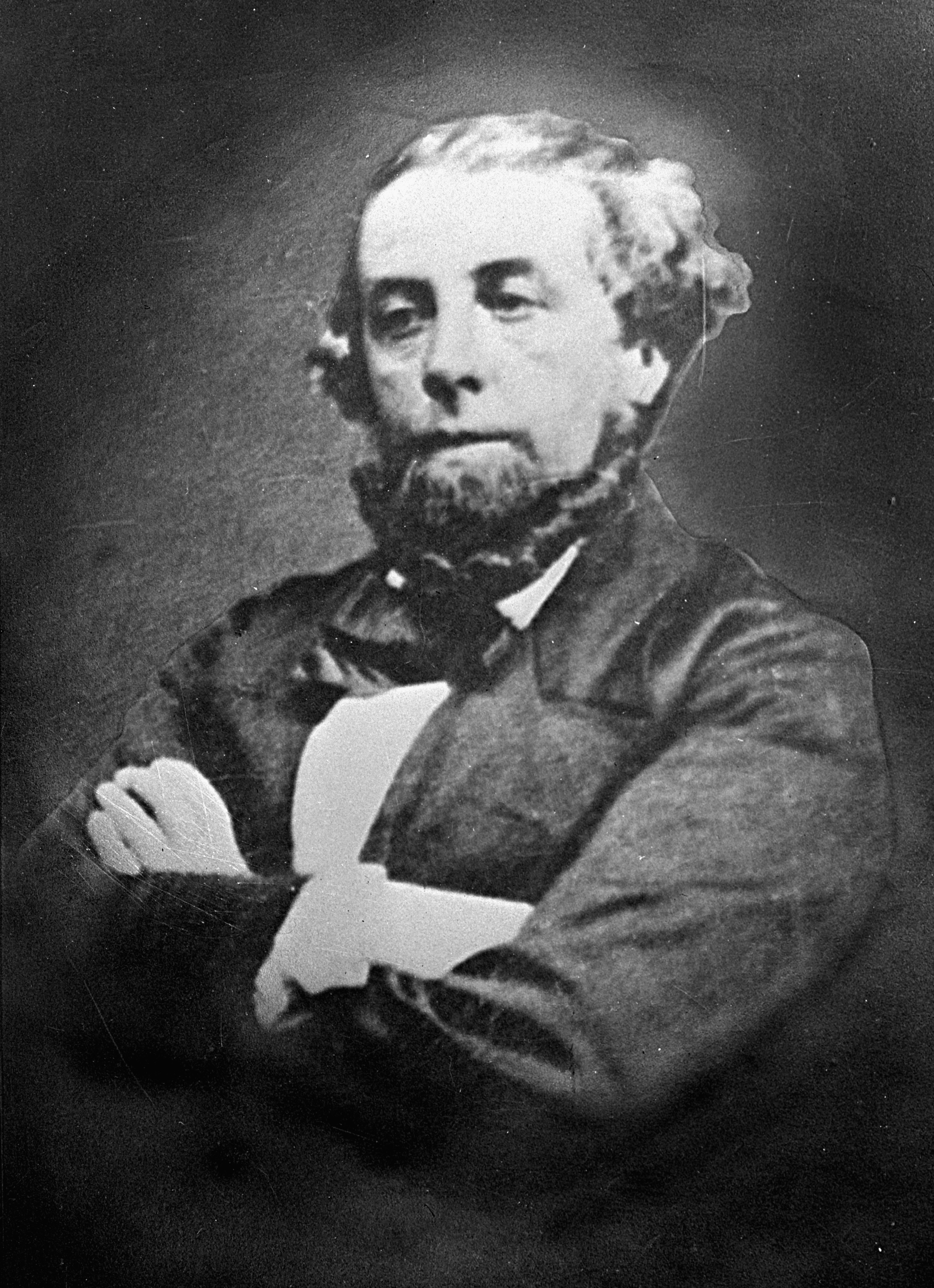
- Thomas Spencer Forsaith circa 1864

Member of the New Zealand Parliament for Northern Division
- In office 23 August 1853 – 15 September 1855

Member of the New Zealand Parliament for City of Auckland
- In office 27 April 1858 – 5 November 1860

Personal details
- Born: 18 July 1814 London, Middlesex
- Died: 29 November 1898 (aged 84) Parramatta
- Spouse: Elizabeth Forsaith (née Clements)
- Relations: Tom Macdonald (great-grandson)
- Children: Charlotte Forsaith

Thomas Spencer Forsaith, JP (18 July 1814 – 29 November 1898), was a New Zealand politician and an Auckland draper. According to some historians, he was the country's second premier, although a more conventional view states that neither he nor his predecessor (James FitzGerald) should properly be given that title.

== Early life ==
Forsaith was born in London, England on 18 July 1814 to Samuel Forsaith (1776–1832) and Elizabeth Forsaith née Emberson (1782–1844). His father was a linen draper and haberdasher. His parents belonged to the Congregational church.

His father's first marriage was to Elizabeth Smyth (1771 – 23 September 1809). They had five children:

- Sarah Smyth Forsaith (4 August 1801 – 26 April 1854)
- Samuel Smyth Forsaith (21 January 1803 – 1 April 1894)
- John Smyth Forsaith (8 October 1804 – 31 July 1883)
- Elizabeth Smyth Forsaith (21 May 1806 – 12 August 1809)
- Mary Smyth Forsaith (19 February 1808 – 3 June 1845)

Of those, Samuel emigrated to New Zealand, arriving in Auckland prior to May 1851. He died in Thames in 1894.

After his first wife's death in September 1809, Samuel Forsaith married Elizabeth née Emberson on 4 October 1810. They had nine children:

- Elizabeth Forsaith (10 July 1811 – 2 July 1841)
- Thomas Forsaith (7 December 1812 – 16 February 1813)
- Thomas Spencer Forsaith (18 July 1814 – 29 November 1898)
- Hannah Forsaith (1 March 1816 – 2 May 1819)
- Phebe Forsaith (6 July 1817 – 6 February 1819)
- David Forsaith (21 June 1819 – 5 September 1819)
- Robert Forsaith (11 July 1820 – 23 May 1883)
- Josiah Forsaith (29 April 1822 – 8 May 1883)
- Hephzibah Forsaith (24 July 1824 – 21 December 1897)
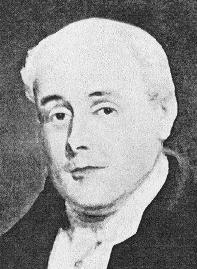
Samuel Forsaith (father)

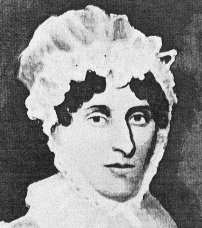
Elizabeth Forsaith (mother)

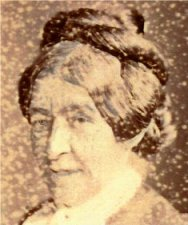
Elizabeth Mary Forsaith (wife)

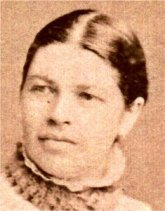
Charlotte Forsaith (daughter)

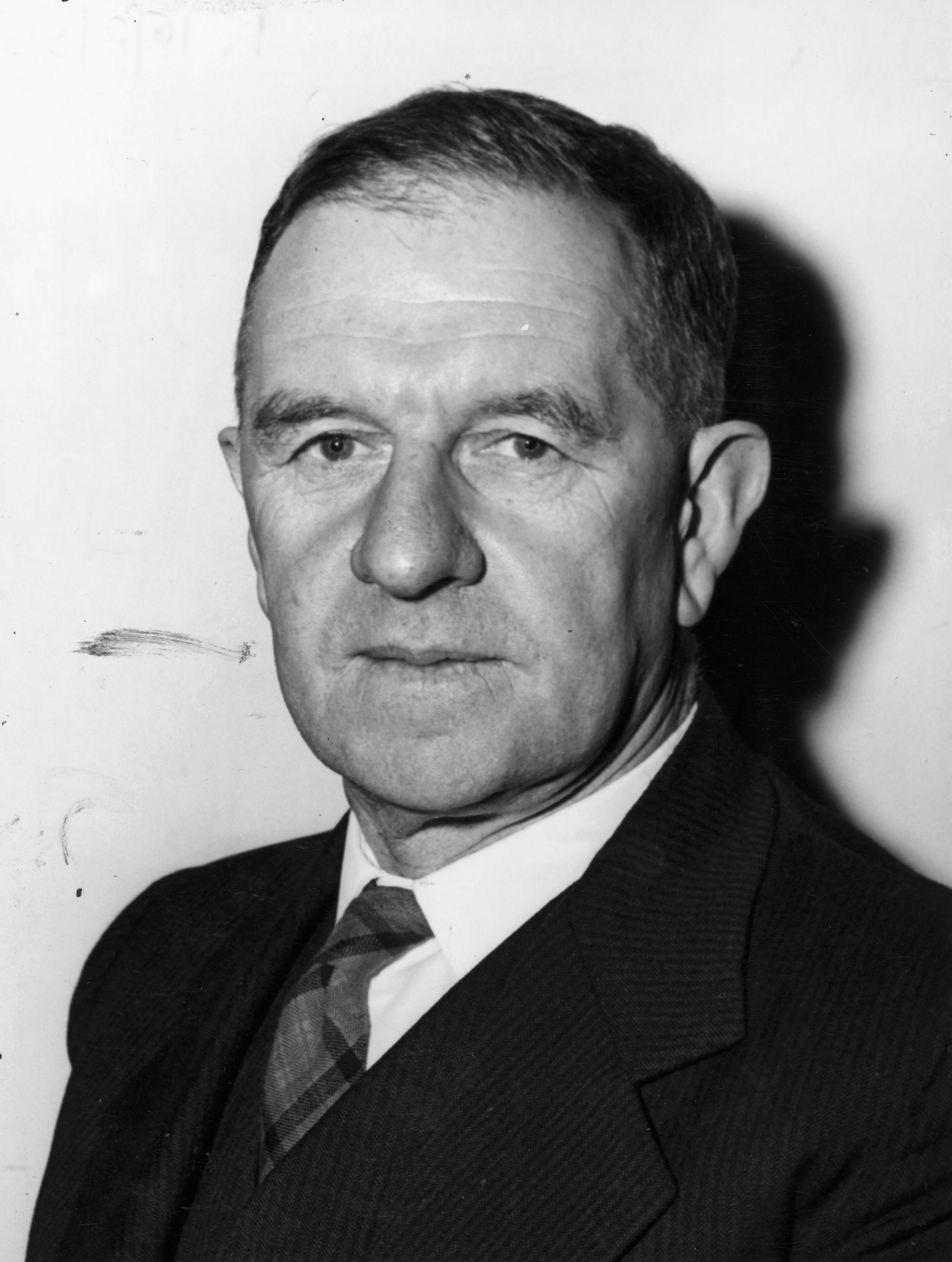
Tom Macdonald (great-grandson)

Apart from Thomas Spencer Forsaith, his sister Hephzibah also emigrated to New Zealand; in 1847 on theElora. All other siblings and his parents remained in England.

Thomas Forsaith became an apprentice as a silk merchant in Croydon, but he rather wanted to go to sea. As a cabin boy, he travelled on a collier to the River Tyne. He then made three journeys to the West Indies as a cadet officer for Charles Horsfall and Co. on the Huddersfield (named after Horsfall's birthplace). He returned home with a good reference, but found that his father had died in the meantime. As a fourth officer, he sailed on the convict ship Hoogley to Botany Bay in 1834. Two years later, he again sailed to Australia, this time on the Lord Goderich. He first came to New Zealand on the return journey, when kauri spars were loaded in Hokianga.

Forsaith was married on 17 May 1838 at the Congregational Church in Old Broad Street, London to Elizabeth Mary, a daughter of Robert Clements of Hoxton. Their wedding was one of the first in a dissenting church that was legalised. They decided to emigrate to New Zealand and Forsaith took woodworking machinery and trading goods with them on the Coromandel later in 1838.

=== Early life in New Zealand ===
Forsaith established himself as a farmer and trader in the Kaipara District. He bought land in 1839 on the Wairoa River near present-day Dargaville. He was likely to have been the first European settler in the area. He built a timber mill for cutting kauri spars, as the British Government was purchasing these at £17 each. He cleared land for wheat and running cattle, which he had to import. By May 1841, he had fenced 12 acres of cleared land, most of it growing wheat.

While the Forsaiths were visiting Sydney in February 1842, the discovery of a Māori skull on their property caused serious trouble, as Māori chiefs including Te Tirarau Kukupa claimed a tapu and ransacked the station as utu. An upset Forsaith asked the Governor (William Hobson) for compensation, who sent the Protector of Aborigines, George Clarke, to investigate. Forsaith was cleared of any wrongdoing, and the Māori chiefs settled by giving him a block of land of 10 square kilometres (2,500 acres). Forsaith, still unsettled by the incident, swapped his land holding with another nearer Auckland. Clarke, who had held his role since April 1840, had not visited the Kaipa District before and made recommendations for a magistracy there.

On 30 October 1843, Charlotte Clements Forsaith was born in Auckland; she was their only child. She was baptised on 5 December that year. She married Thomas Morell MacDonald at her father's residence in Khyber Pass Road, Auckland, on 7 January 1862. Their grandson Tom Macdonald (1898–1980) was a New Zealand Member of Parliament for over 20 years. Charlotte died on 12 December 1894 in Invercargill.

=== Protectorate Department ===
Hobson, impressed by Forsaith's command of the Māori language and his knowledge of their customs, offered him the role of Sub-protector of Aborigines, which he accepted. Forsaith was thus reporting to Clarke. They were working in the Protectorate Department created by Hobson, following instructions from the British secretary of state for the colonies. The department's role was "to watch over the interests of the Aborigines as their protector" and had religious, social and intellectual aspects. It was also given a second role, which conflicted with the first; since the Treaty of Waitangi, the Crown was the sole purchaser of Māori land, and the department's role was to action the purchases. Clarke managed to persuade Hobson to free him of the land purchase role, but it remained within the scope of the Sub-protectors.

In 1843, Forsaith was promoted to Protector in succession of Clarke. Forsaith worked closely with the second Governor, Robert FitzRoy. They travelled in the Cook Strait area in 1844, and to the Māori meeting at Waikanae following the Wairau Affray near Tuamarina, the first serious clash of arms between Māori and colonists. Forsaith was then stationed in Wellington and witnessed the Te Aro land purchase in February 1844. He negotiated with Te Rangihaeata about the evacuation of land in the Hutt Valley, but the actions of the New Zealand Company and the impatience of the settlers to move onto disputed land resulted in the Hutt Valley campaign. He acted as interpreter for Mathew Richmond, the Government Superintendent for the Southern District, and Bishop Selwyn, the first Anglican Bishop of New Zealand. When the influential chief Te Rauparaha visited Wellington in 1845, he was shown around by Forsaith.

In 1846, the department was abolished by the next Governor, George Grey, as he wanted to have influence over Māori issues himself. Grey appointed a Native Secretary instead. Forsaith left Government employment in the following year.

=== Business interests ===
Forsaith opened a drapery store in Auckland's Queen Street. He had this business from 1847 to 1862. He also edited the Daily Southern Cross newspaper for a while. He became a Justice of the peace in 1857.

== Political career ==
=== New Ulster Council ===
The Proclamation of 1852 stipulated that the New Ulster Legislative Council, which had been in place since 1848, was to have twelve elected and six nominated members. Forsaith was asked by a group of electors to become a candidate. Elections in the Northern Division District were held on 31 August 1852, and Allan O'Neill (from Bayswater) and Forsaith were returned. The council had not met by the time the New Zealand Constitution Act 1852 arrived, which resulted in the abolition of New Ulster and New Munster provinces and their replacement with new provincial governments and established, a bicameral New Zealand Parliament, consisting of the General Assembly, the Governor, and a legislative council.

=== Parliament ===
New Zealand Parliament
Years	Term	Electorate	Party
1853–1855	1st	Northern Division	Independent
1858–1860	2nd	City of Auckland	Independent

Forsaith once again stood for election and he and Walter Lee were returned on 23 August 1853 to the 1st New Zealand Parliament as representatives of the Northern Division electorate, which covered the area north of Auckland but south of Whangārei.

The 1854 FitzGerald ministry was the first Executive Council under the 1852 Constitution led by James FitzGerald. When it became clear that the first ministers had no power, they resigned as the Executive after seven weeks on 2 August 1854. Robert Wynyard, the administrator filling in after Grey's departure and before the arrival of the next Governor, Colonel Thomas Gore Browne prorogued Parliament as the members refused to accept his claim that responsible government was not possible without royal assent, which had not been given. In the second session of the 1st Parliament, Forsaith, as a member of the minority which supported Wynyard, was appointed by Wynyard to lead an Executive. The other members of this Executive were Jerningham Wakefield, William Travers and James Macandrew. This appointed Cabinet did not have the confidence of Parliament and lasted only from 31 August to 2 September 1854. Forsaith's Ministry is the shortest in New Zealand's parliamentary history.

When Browne arrived, he announced that self-government would begin with the 2nd New Zealand Parliament. No new Cabinet was formed before then, but when it did, responsible government was obtained under the Sewell Ministry led by Henry Sewell.

In the 1855 general election, Northern Division was contested by four candidates. The two incumbents, Forsaith and Lee, stood against Thomas Henderson and Joseph May (who would later become a prominent member of the Auckland Provincial Council). They received 292, 294, 363 and 213 votes, respectively. Henderson and Lee were thus declared elected, and Forsaith was beaten by two votes.

Forsaith and Reader Wood contested a vacancy in the City of Auckland electorate. The nomination meeting on 26 April 1858 sparked little interest. A show of hands was in favour of Forsaith, and Wood called for a poll. The election was held the next day and Forsaith was elected. Parliament at the time was in session, and he took the oath on 28 April, being welcomed back by the speaker.

Wiremu Kīngi Te Rangitāke, the paramount chief of Te Āti Awa, refused to sell land to the government. When Te Teira, one of the minor chiefs of the tribe, agreed to sell land, many missionaries and a previous Chief Justice, William Martin, warned that the purchase was illegal. The events resulted in the First Taranaki War. Forsaith supported Kingi in Parliament and made himself deeply unpopular, which effectively ended his political career. He retired at the end of the 2nd Parliament.

Forsaith was a deeply religious person, and he gave religious lectures to the public while he was a member of parliament. During his time in the 1st Parliament, he tried to secure religious toleration. He successfully defeated Hugh Carleton's motion of having Bishop Selwyn's salary paid by the Government, thus preventing the Anglican Church from becoming the one religion endorsed by the state.

== Services to the church ==
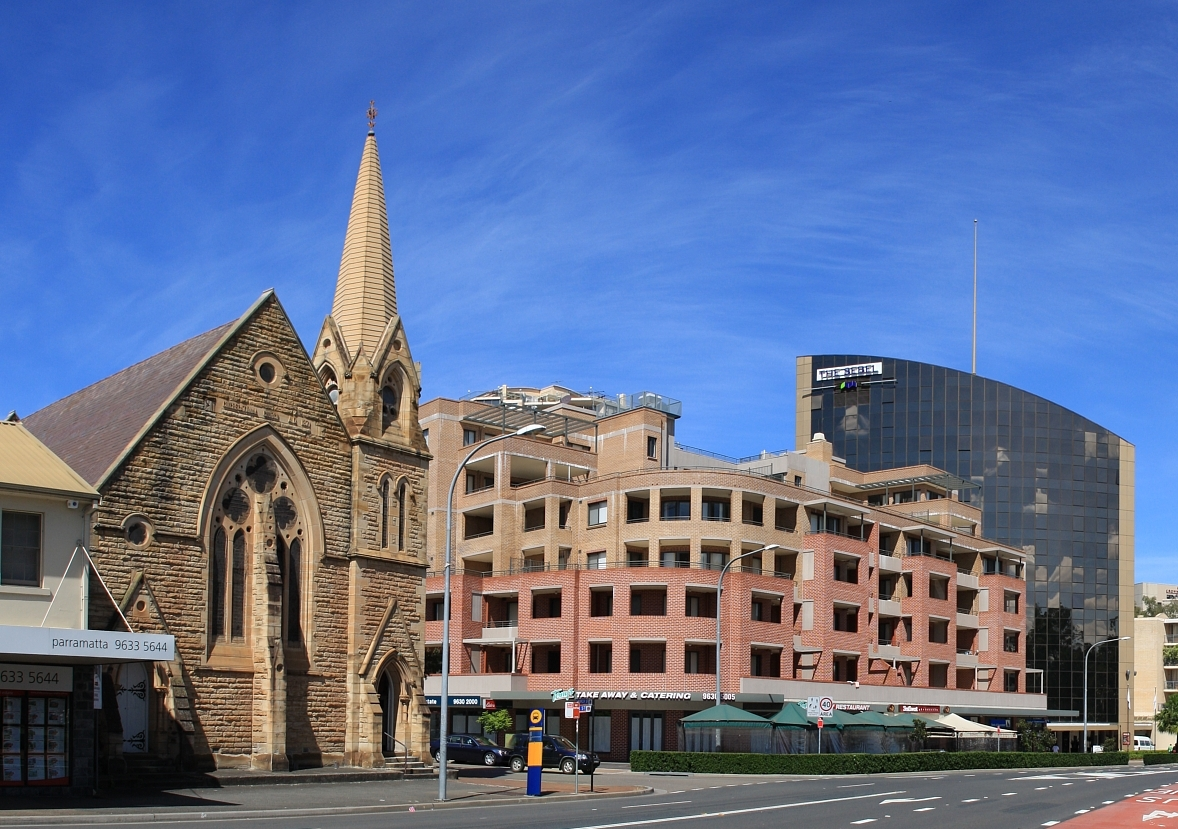
Congregational Church in Parramatta

In 1862, Forsaith entered the services of the church. Since 1850, he had belonged to the Presbyterian Church. In early 1865, he was considered to become a minister at the gold fields in Tuapeka, but the Presbytery in Dunedin voted against licensing him, as he hadn't completed his studies yet. The view was held that a "minister of the Gospel should be able to read at least the New Testament in the original [Greek] text". Instead, Forsaith was offered a missionary post to the gold fields, which he declined. In July of that year, he was instead ordained as a pastor at the new Congregational Church at Port Chalmers.

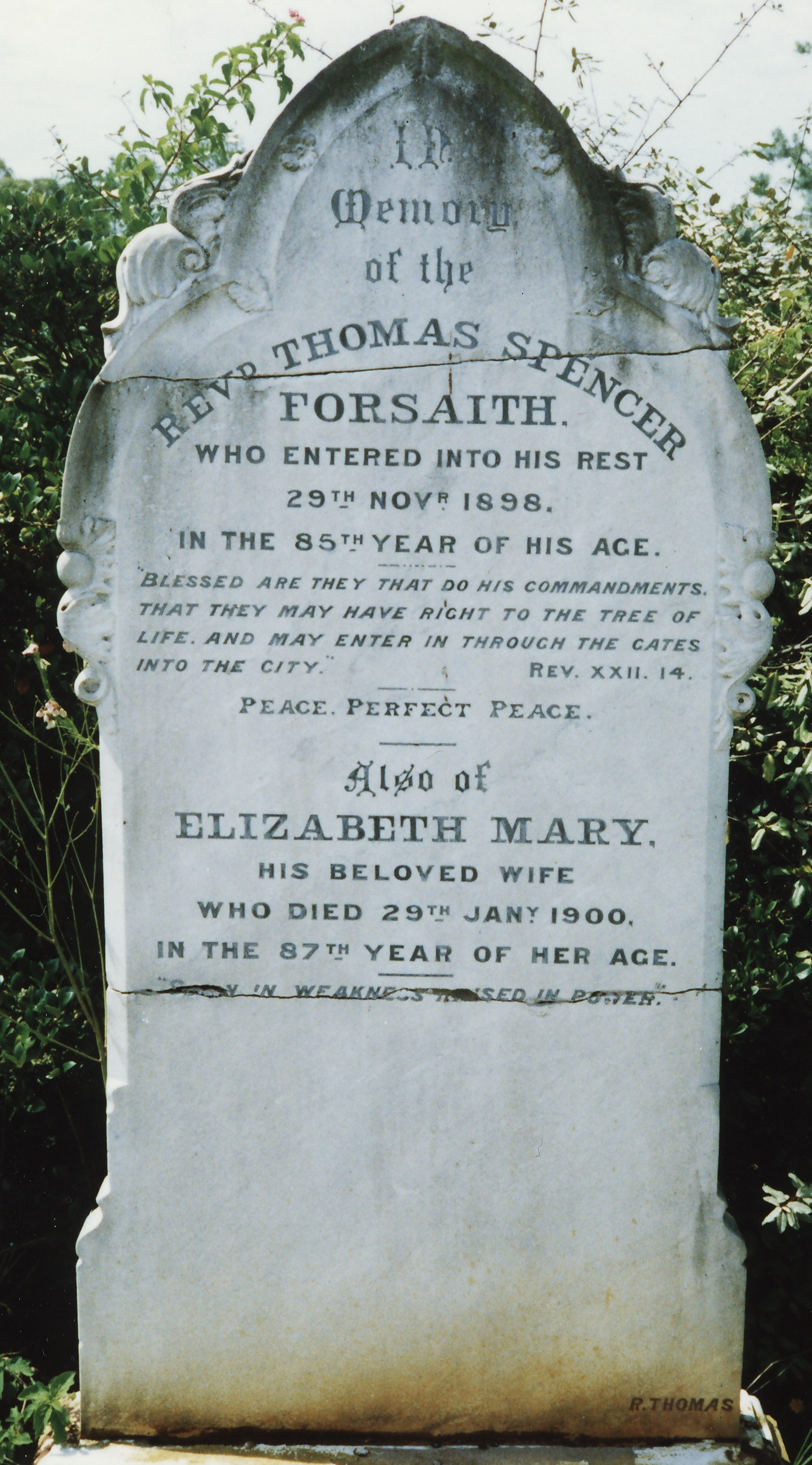
Gravestone for Thomas Spencer Forsaith and his wife Elizabeth Mary

In 1867, Forsaith accepted an invitation for a pastorate at Woollahra. His health had suffered over the winter, and apparently he hoped for an improvement in the warmer climate. He left New Zealand on board the Parisian on 23 September 1867. In 1868, he moved to Parramatta, where he initially held services in the School of Arts. A church was built for the community, which opened on 19 May 1872. Also in 1872, Forsaith became chairman of the Congregational Union of New South Wales. In 1874, he acquired Morton House in Melville St, Parramatta, the house of the solicitor John Morton Gould, father of Albert Gould. Morton House remained the principal family residence for the rest of his life.

In 1878, he became resident chaplain at Camden College, a theological college founded in 1864. From there, he initiated a branch mission at Haslam's Creek, but moved back to Parramatta in 1882.

Subsequent to this, a period of travel started. He went to New Zealand (he left Melbourne for New Zealand in March 1882 on the Rotomahana), America, Canada and Europe, including lecture series in Britain (which attracted many new immigrants to New Zealand) and officiating at the Presbyterian Church in Venice. He returned to Melbourne from Britain in April 1884 on the Berengaria. He then relieved at churches in Australia, Dunedin and Invercargill.

== Death and commemoration ==
He began his memoirs in early 1898 and wrote a will on 13 June 1898. The will requests that busts of him and his wife be installed at the Congregational Church in Parramatta, but this has never happened. The first twelve chapters of his auto-biography have been lost, but the remaining chapters are held at the National Library in Canberra. Forsaith died on 29 November 1898 in Parramatta. He is buried at Rookwood Cemetery, sharing a grave with his wife, who died on 29 January 1900. Their daughter had died before them in 1894, and her husband Thomas Morell MacDonald was one of the executors of Thomas Forsaith's will.

He was described as "calmly spending the evening of life in the midst of the orange groves at Parramatta, a venerable, vigorous, and versatile octogenarian colonist."

== Notes ==
New Zealand Parliament
New constituency	Member of Parliament for Northern Division; 1853–1855; Served alongside: Walter Lee	Succeeded by Thomas Henderson
Preceded by John Logan Campbell	Member of Parliament for City of Auckland; 1858–1860; Served alongside: Thomas Beckham, Archibald Clark, William Daldy	In abeyance Title next held by William Lee Rees; John Shera; Thomas Thompson
