= 1860 City of Auckland by-election =

New Zealand by-election

The 1860 City of Auckland by-election was a by-election held on 5 April in the City of Auckland electorate in Auckland during the 2nd New Zealand Parliament.

The by-election was caused by the resignation of the incumbent, Thomas Beckham.

He was replaced by Archibald Clark.

Clark's opponent, Bernard Reynolds, was a member of the Auckland Provincial Council for the Pensioner Settlements.

== Results ==
1860 City of Auckland by-election
Party	Candidate	Votes	%	±%
Independent	Archibald Clark	318	77.56	
Independent	Bernard Reynolds	92	22.44	
Turnout		410		
Majority		226	55.12	
