= 1860 County of Hawke by-election =

New Zealand by-election

The County of Hawke by-election of 1860 was a by-election held in the County of Hawke electorate during the 2nd New Zealand Parliament, on 26 April 1860.

The by-election was caused by the resignation of incumbent MP James Ferguson on 10 March 1860, and was won unopposed by Thomas FitzGerald. A nomination meeting was held on 26 April 1860. FitzGerald was proposed and seconded. Another person (Richard John Duncan) was proposed, but no seconder was found. A third person (William Colenso) was proposed and seconded, but declared that he didn't want to stand. The returning officer advised that Colenso could not withdraw once he had been seconded. After addressing the electors, a show of hands was called for, and the returning officer declared the result to be in favour of FitzGerald. One of the attendees then proposed a formal vote, but this was not seconded. The returning officer thus declared FitzGerald duly elected.
