= 1858 Wairarapa and Hawke's Bay by-election =

New Zealand by-election

The 1858 Wairarapa and Hawke's Bay by-election was a by-election held in the Wairarapa and Hawke's Bay electorate during the 2nd New Zealand Parliament, on 22 July 1858.

The by-election was caused by the resignation of incumbent MP J. Valentine Smith and was won unopposed by James Ferguson. Owing to an arbitrary shortening of the time between the issue of the writ and the holding of nominations at Castlepoint (where a single nomination was received) the election was over before many electors knew it was due to take place. Charles Carter had published his intention to stand on 17 July – five days before the nomination. The validity of the election was called into question and a petition was sent to the Governor requesting a new writ, although it seems it was disallowed. The Electoral Districts Act 1858 (coincidentally passed a few weeks after the election) split the electorate in two with Ferguson declared as incumbent in County of Hawke and Carter winning Wairarapa in the 1859 supplementary election.
