= 1856 Fox ministry =

Former government of New Zealand

The Fox Ministry was the second responsible government to be formed in New Zealand. It formed in 1856, but lasted less than a month, from 20 May to 2 June 1856. From the outset, William Fox served as Prime Minister as well as Attorney-General.

== Background ==
Fox was the leader of a 'Wellington Party' of provincial supporters in opposition to the government of Henry Sewell during the 1856 session of Parliament. He moved resolutions which led to the Sewell Ministry's demise. Fox subsequently formed a new ministry at the Governor's invitation. His provincial policies were seen as too extreme for many members, particularly from Auckland. Fox remained much respected in Wellington though had few supporters elsewhere. His administration lasted only weeks and it was not long before he in turn was succeeded by a more centrist, long-lasting administration led by Edward Stafford, which governed until 1861.

== Ministers ==
The following members served on the Fox Ministry:

Name	Image	Office	Term
William Fox		Member of Executive Council	20 May 1856 – 2 June 1856
William Fox		Attorney-General	20 May 1856 – 2 June 1856
John Hall		Member of Executive Council	20 May 1856 – 2 June 1856
John Hall		Colonial Secretary	20 May 1856 – 2 June 1856
Charles Brown		Member of Executive Council	20 May 1856 – 2 June 1856
Charles Brown		Colonial Treasurer	20 May 1856 – 2 June 1856
William Daldy		Member of Executive Council	20 May 1856 – 2 June 1856
Ralph Richardson		Member of Executive Council	24 May 1856 – 2 June 1856
Robert Wynyard		Member of Executive Council	24 May 1856 – 2 June 1856

== See also ==
- List of New Zealand governments
