= County of Hawke (electorate) =

County of Hawke was a 19th-century parliamentary electorate in what is now the Hawke's Bay Region of New Zealand in the 2nd New Zealand Parliament in 1860.

== History ==
In 1858 the General Assembly made some significant changes to electoral boundaries and increased parliamentary representation from 37 members to 41. One of the changes meant the Wairarapa and Hawke's Bay electorate was split into its two separate components (with both Wairarapa and County of Hawke expanding inland into previously unincorporated areas). County of Hawke was represented by two Members of Parliament, James Ferguson, incumbent in the seat as member for the previous Wairarapa and Hawke's Bay electorate and Thomas FitzGerald from 26 April to 5 November in 1860 after winning the 1860 by-election.

The second Parliament was dissolved on 5 November, and FitzGerald did not seek election to the new Parliament. He had been elected Superintendent of the new Hawke's Bay Province in 1859. He moved to Queensland, Australia in 1862.

In 1861, the new Napier seat was formed in Hawke's Bay.

== Members ==
Election	Winner
1858 by-election	James Ferguson
1860 by-election	Thomas FitzGerald
