= 1856 Motueka and Massacre Bay by-election =

1856 New Zealand by-election

- 17 May 1856 (Nomination day)
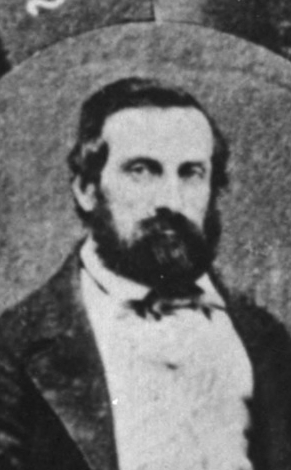
Candidate	Herbert Curtis
Party	Independent
MP before election
Charles Parker
Independent
Elected MP
Herbert Curtis
Independent

The 1856 Motueka and Massacre Bay by-election was a by-election held in the Motueka and Massacre Bay electorate during the 2nd New Zealand Parliament caused by the resignation of incumbent MP Charles Parker. The by-election was set for 19 May 1856, with a nomination meeting two days prior to that. The resident magistrate of Nelson, John Poynter, was the returning officer. George White, the clerk of the Nelson Provincial Council, was the first to announce their candidacy; he was barely known to the electorate. Herbert Curtis, who was a merchant in Nelson in partnership with his brother Oswald, was asked to become a candidate. After Curtis was well received at his one public address, White withdrew. Curtis was declared elected at the nomination meeting, as he was the only candidate proposed.

== Background ==
The by-election was caused by the resignation of incumbent MP Charles Parker on 15 April 1856. The resignation was announced in the House of Representatives the following day. It was widely believed that Parker's resignation was related to the health of his eldest daughter.

== Candidates and campaigning ==
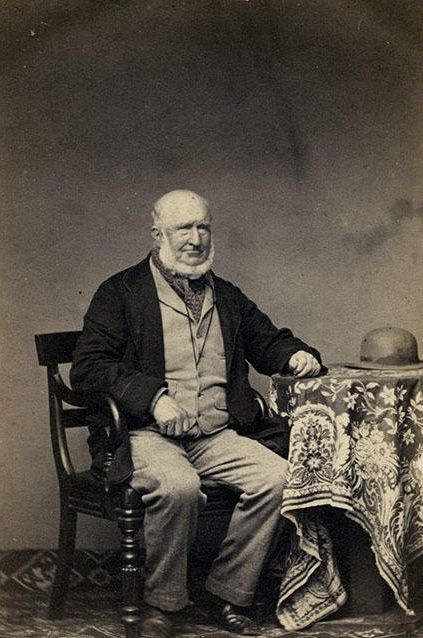
George White was the initial candidate for the by-election, but he withdrew

John Poynter, the resident magistrate of Nelson since 1854, was appointed as returning officer for the election. Poynter set Saturday, 17 May, as the nomination day, and 19 May for the polling day. The schoolhouse in Motueka was chosen as the venue for both those events. The polling booth was to be open from 10 am to 4 pm. These details were first published in The Nelson Examiner and New Zealand Chronicle on 3 May.

George White announced his candidacy via advertisement in The Nelson Examiner and New Zealand Chronicle, with the advert first appearing on 7 May. Educated at Eton College, White had been clerk of committees in the House of Commons from 1810 to 1839, when he immigrated to New Zealand. First residing in Wellington, White moved to Nelson upon his appointment as Police Magistrate after the death of Henry Thompson in the Wairau Affray. White was dismissed by Governor Robert FitzRoy for owning the Dictionnaire philosophique by Voltaire. White was appointed as the inaugural clerk of the Nelson Provincial Council and held that position until his death in 1867 aged 81.

Herbert Curtis was invited by John MacKenzie to a meeting at the Motueka Hotel on 12 May to give his political opinions. Curtis, who was a merchant in Nelson with his younger brother Oswald, stated that he would only put his nomination forward if he gained the impression at the meeting that he had support from the electors. Should White even have a "moderate chance of election", he would retire from the contest. MacKenzie chaired the meeting that was attended by circa seventy people. After his address, various questions were put to Curtis. Captain Edward Fearon, who was known as the "King of Motueka", then moved a resolution that was seconded by Charles Thorp:

That this meeting is of opinion that Mr. Curtis is a fit and proper person to represent this district in the House of Representatives.

The motion was carried unanimously.

== Nomination meeting ==
The nomination meeting was held on 17 May. It had become known before the meeting that White had withdrawn, and that Curtis would thus be elected unopposed. Consequently, the meeting was not well attended. Curtis was proposed by Thomas Jacka and seconded by John Danforth Greenwood. As nobody else was nominated, Curtis was declared elected unopposed. White, who was present at the nomination meeting, acknowledged that he was virtually unknown in the district and if he had known that another person would come forward, he would not have become a candidate.

== Aftermath ==
Curtis served out the remaining term of the 2nd New Zealand Parliament, when the Motueka and Massacre Bay electorate was abolished and replaced by the Motueka electorate. Curtis was re-elected in the 1861 general election for the 3rd New Zealand Parliament. He was succeeded in the 1866 general election by Parker.

The school building from the 1850s still exists. At the time, it was located adjacent to St Thomas's Anglican Church at 101 High Street. The school building was relocated in 1998 further south along High Street and is now a shop and restaurant known as TOAD Hall, with the abbreviation standing for The Old Anglican Diocesan Hall.
