= 1867 Northern Division by-election =

The 1867 Northern Division by-election was a by-election to the New Zealand House of Representatives, during the term of the 4th Parliament on 1 July. The Northern Division electorate was a mostly rural electorate in the northern Auckland region.

The by-election was triggered by the resignation of Thomas Henderson. The nomination meeting was held on 24 June at the pilot station in Devonport (Flagstaff) on the North Shore. Henry Balneavis was the returning officer. Captain Isaac Cooper (a member of the Auckland Provincial Council) and Thomas Macfarlane were the candidates put forward. Macfarlane had prominent backers, with Patrick Dignan (member of the house of representatives) and David Sheehan (member of the provincial council) proposing and seconding the nomination. Captain Cooper was nominated by Captain Gladwyn Wynyard (the son of Auckland's first Superintendent, Robert Wynyard) and seconded by Philip Callan (a landowner, builder and publican on the North Shore). Macfarlane was Henderson's business partner. A show of hands was thirteen to six in favour of Macfarlane, with Cooper demanding a poll. The polling date was set for 1 July.

The following polling places were used:

- Pilot Station at Flagstaff, North Shore
- Little Muddy Creek at John McPike's residence
- Henderson's Mill at the locality of the same name
- Stokes' Point at Mr Reed's residence
- Weiti at Mr Lloyd's barn
- Mahurangi at the Public Hall
- Mahurangi at the Old Survey Station
- Waiwera at the post office
- Matakana at Mr Munro's store
- Helensville / Kaipara at the Old Court House
- Pitoitoi / Riverhead at Mr Keogh's house

The by-election was held on 1 July:

1867 Northern Division by-election
Party	Candidate	Votes	%	±%
Independent	Thomas Macfarlane	234	63.76	
Independent	Captain Isaac Cooper	133	36.24	
Turnout		367		
Majority		101	27.52	

Macfarlane had very strong support at the principal polling station on the North Shore, with 124 votes to 29. Due to the rural nature of the electorate, it took a few more days for all the results to come in and the final result was released on 6 July. Macfarlane won by a large margin, similar to the margin achieved at the principal polling place, and was declared elected.
