= Herbert Curtis =

New Zealand politician (1818–1890)

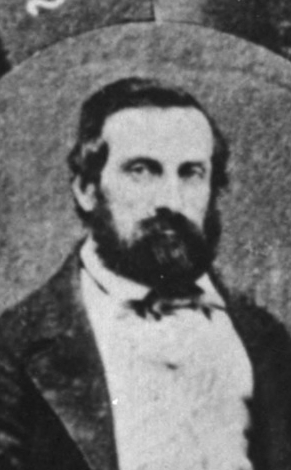
- Curtis in 1860

Member of the New Zealand Parliament for Motueka and Massacre Bay
- In office 19 May 1856 – 5 November 1860

Member of the New Zealand Parliament for Motueka
- In office 5 February 1861 – 30 October 1865

Personal details
- Born: Herbert Evelyn Curtis; 1818 England
- Died: 10 August 1890 (aged 72) Toi Toi Valley, Nelson, New Zealand
- Relations: Oswald Curtis (brother)
- Occupation: Politician
- Profession: Merchant

Herbert Evelyn Curtis (1818 – 10 August 1890) was a Member of Parliament in Nelson, New Zealand. He was also a merchant, in partnership with his brother Oswald.

== Early life ==
Curtis was born in 1818 in England. He was the son of Stephen Curtis and Eleanora Llewellyn. Together with his younger brother Oswald, he migrated to Nelson in 1853, arriving on 18 June. Curtis married Annie Lineker on 4 March 1863 at Christ Church Cathedral.

== Mahomed Shah ==
The Curtis brothers had been passengers on the barque Mahomed Shah. The ship sailed from England for New Zealand on 15 January 1853. On 18 April, about 400 nautical miles (740 km; 460 mi) south of Cape Leeuwin, the ship caught fire. All on board were rescued two days later by the brig The Ellen under Captain Pardon. The Ellen was sailing from Mauritius to Hobart, Tasmania. The ship's position was given as 40°10′00″S 119°10′00″E. Those rescued were taken to Hobart, arriving there on 6 May 1853.

== Political career ==
New Zealand Parliament
Years	Term	Electorate	Party
1856–1860	2nd	Motueka and Massacre Bay	Independent
1861–1866	3rd	Motueka	Independent

He represented the Motueka and Massacre Bay electorate from 1856 to 1860, then the Motueka electorate from 1861 to 1866, when he retired. His brother Oswald was elected to the City of Nelson (New Zealand electorate) in 1866.

In the later years of Nelson Province, he was the provincial auditor. He was never elected onto the Nelson Provincial Council.

== Commercial life ==
Herbert and Oswald Curtis were partners as merchants in Nelson. They were Nelson agents for the New Zealand Steam Navigation Company.

== Death ==
He died at his residence The Aspens in Nelson's Toi Toi Valley on 10 August 1890 aged 72. He is buried at Wakapuaka Cemetery.

New Zealand Parliament
Preceded by Charles Parker	Member of Parliament for Motueka and Massacre Bay; 1856–1860	Electorate renamed
New title Electorate renamed	Member of Parliament for Motueka; 1861–1866	Succeeded by Charles Parker
