= 1856 Sewell ministry =

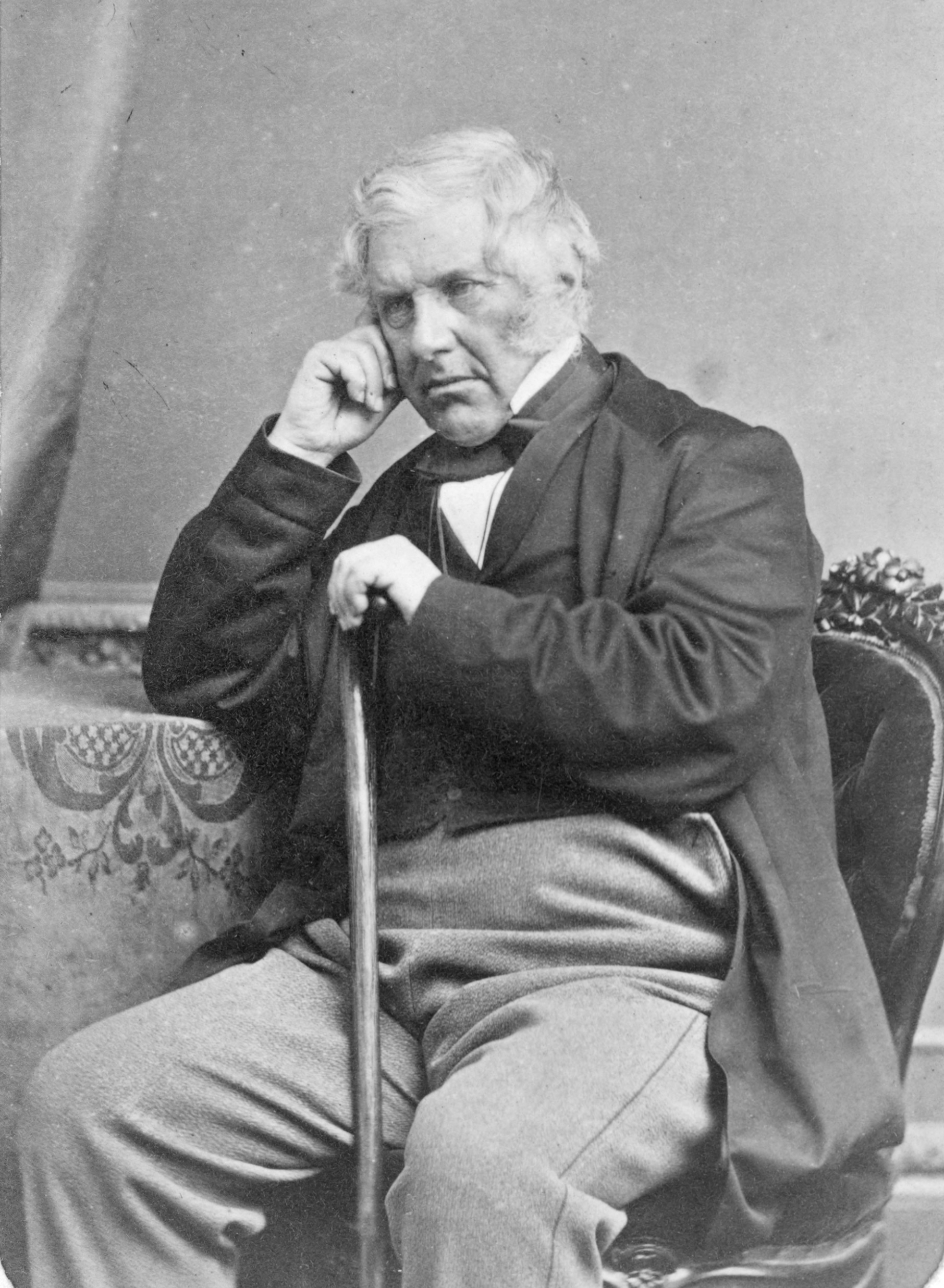
Henry Sewell, 1st Premier of New Zealand

The Sewell ministry was the first responsible government in New Zealand. Unlike previous executives, its members were held accountable to Parliament. This would form the basis for future governments in New Zealand.

The ministry formed in 1856, but lasted only one month, from 18 April to 20 May. From 7 May onwards, Henry Sewell held office as colonial secretary, considered to be the equivalent of a prime minister or premier. Thus, Sewell is regarded as the first prime minister of New Zealand.It was replaced by the Fox Ministry on May 20th 1856.

== Historic context ==
Sir George Grey, the third governor of New Zealand, greatly influenced the New Zealand Constitution Act 1852 (UK), which granted the colony self-government, allowing for a bicameral Parliament consisting of an elected House of Representatives of 24 to 42 members, and an appointed Legislative Council of not fewer than ten members. It also allowed for provinces to be formed, each presided over by an elected superintendent, for initially Auckland, Taranaki, Wellington, Nelson, Canterbury and Otago. Elections were held in 1853 for the provincial councils, the superintendents, and the House of Representatives. In this federal system, the central government had responsibility over defence and native affairs, and the provincial governments had substantial powers of their own.

The system of government was set up at a time when European settlements were scattered and small, and communications and travel were rather difficult. Virtually all long distance travel and transport of goods was by sea.

To be eligible to vote in either the provincial or national elections, voters had to be male owners of property valued at £50, or leasehold valued at £10. The first Parliament had 37 members, elected by 5849 voters, of which around 100 were Maori. Once the provincial governments had been set up, New Zealand had given itself six miniature parliaments, endeavouring to emulate Westminster as best they could, for a total European population of about 30,000. And all of that in addition to the bicameral Parliament.

At the first meeting of Parliament in May 1854, a resolution was passed that the House be given responsible and representative government immediately, i.e. the power to appoint an Executive Council that has decision-making powers. Robert Wynyard, the administrator filling in after Grey's departure and before the arrival of the next governor, Colonel Thomas Gore Browne, formed an Executive Council led by James FitzGerald (the Fitzgerald ministry). When it became clear that the first ministers had no power, they resigned as the Executive after seven weeks. Wynyard prorogued Parliament as the members refused to accept his claim that responsible government was not possible without royal assent, which had not been given. In the next session, Thomas Forsaith, a member of the minority that supported Wynyard, was appointed by Wynyard to lead an Executive (the Forsaith ministry). This appointed ministry did not have the confidence of Parliament and lasted only from 31 August to 2 September 1854.

When Browne arrived, he announced that self-government would begin with the 2nd New Zealand Parliament.

== First responsible government ==
Henry Sewell, who had been a member of the 1st Parliament, stood for re-election in the Town of Christchurch electorate, and was returned. As a result of his previous service on Fitzgerald's first Executive Council, Sewell was asked by Browne to form a government. He was appointed to the Executive Council on 18 April 1856, and became Colonial Secretary (considered to be the equivalent of Prime Minister), at the head of New Zealand's first responsible government, on 7 May. Dillon Bell became Colonial Treasurer, Frederick Whitaker became Attorney-General, and Henry Tancred became a minister without portfolio. Whitaker and Tancred were both members of the Legislative Council.

Previously, the Executive Council had functioned as an advisory group to the governor, and ministerial functions were performed by appointed officials, not politicians. The various "ministers" serving on the Council, such as Andrew Sinclair (Colonial Secretary since 1844) and Alexander Shepherd (Colonial Treasurer since 1842), retired from their roles.

=== Ministers ===
The following members served on the Sewell ministry:

Name	Image	Office	Term
Henry Sewell		Member of Executive Council	18 April 1856 – 20 May 1856
Henry Sewell		Colonial Secretary	7 May 1856 – 20 May 1856
Dillon Bell		Member of Executive Council	18 April 1856 – 20 May 1856
Dillon Bell		Colonial Treasurer	7 May 1856 – 20 May 1856
Frederick Whitaker		Member of Executive Council	18 April 1856 – 20 May 1856
Frederick Whitaker		Attorney-General	7 May 1856 – 20 May 1856
Henry Tancred		Member of Executive Council	18 April 1856 – 20 May 1856

== See also ==
- Government of New Zealand
