= Motueka and Massacre Bay (electorate) =

Motueka and Massacre Bay was one of the original parliamentary electorates created for the 1st New Zealand Parliament. It existed from 1853 to 1860 and was represented by three Members of Parliament. In the 1860 electoral redistribution, the area was split in half, and the Motueka and Collingwood electorates were created from it.

== Population centres ==
The New Zealand Constitution Act 1852, passed by the British government, allowed New Zealand to establish a representative government. The initial 24 New Zealand electorates were defined by Governor George Grey in March 1853. Motueka and Massacre Bay was one of the initial single-member electorates.

For the 1853 election, there were 94 registered electors. For the next general election held in 1855, there were 206 registered voters. Settlements within the electorate were Motueka, Tākaka, and Collingwood. The modern name of Massacre Bay is Golden Bay.

In the 1860 electoral redistribution, the House of Representatives increased the number of representatives by 12, reflecting the immense population growth since the original electorates were established in 1853. The redistribution created 15 additional electorates with between one and three members. The Motueka and Massacre Bay electorate was split up, and about half the area went to the Motueka electorate, and the other half went to the Collingwood electorate.

== History ==
During the 1st and 2nd New Zealand Parliament, Motueka and Massacre Bay was represented by three Members of Parliament: Alfred Christopher Picard 1853–55, Charles Parker 1855–56, and Herbert Curtis 1856–60. Picard died on 17 September 1855, only two days after the dissolution of the 1st Parliament. The 1855 election was contested by Edward Dodson Salisbury and Charles Parker, with Parker being successful. On nomination day, David Jennings was also nominated but he withdrew prior to the election.

=== Members ===
Key Independent

Election	Winner
1853 election	Alfred Christopher Picard
1855 election	Charles Parker
1856 by-election	Herbert Curtis

== Election results ==
=== 1855 election ===
1855 general election: Motueka and Massacre Bay
Party	Candidate	Votes	%	±%
Independent	Charles Parker	80	84.21	
Independent	Edward Dodson Salisbury	15	15.79	
Majority		65	68.42	+24.84
Turnout		95	46.12	−3.18
Registered electors		206		

=== 1853 election ===
1853 general election: Motueka and Massacre Bay
Party	Candidate	Votes	%	±%
Independent	Alfred Christopher Picard	44	57.89	
Independent	Samuel Stephens	32	42.11	
Majority		12	15.79	
Turnout		76	80.85	
Registered electors		94		
