= 1860 Northern Division by-election =

New Zealand by-election

The 1860 Northern Division by-election was a by-election held on 23 May in the Northern Division electorate in Auckland during the 2nd New Zealand Parliament.

The by-election was caused by the resignation of the incumbent, Thomas Henderson.

Henderson was the only nomination for the by-election, so was declared (re)elected unopposed. He had resigned because he was not able to go down the Assembly Session in Wellington, which was summoned for 3 May, as his partner Mr Macfarlane was absent and was not expected back by that date. So he had resigned as he wanted Auckland to be "fully represented". But the Assembly was postponed and his business partner had returned. He was "requested to resume his seat" and had consented.
