= Northern Division (New Zealand electorate) =

Northern Division was a two-member parliamentary electorate in the Auckland Region, New Zealand from 1853 to 1870.

== Geographic distribution ==
The southern boundary went through the Manukau and Waitematā Harbours, but excluded the areas covered by the City of Auckland and Suburbs of Auckland electorates. The area south of the harbours was covered by the Southern Division electorate. In the north, the electorate originally went nearly as far as Whangārei on the east coast, and included the area around Dargaville on the west coast. The Electoral Districts Act 1858 established four new electorates. The Northern Division and Bay of Islands electorates were combined and redivided, and the Marsden electorate was formed and placed between the two electorates, but the vast majority of the new electorate's area came from the Northern Division. After this division, the northern boundary was just north of Warkworth.

== History ==
The 1855 general election was contested by four candidates. The two incumbents, Thomas Forsaith and Walter Lee stood against Thomas Henderson and Mr May. They received 292, 294, 363 and 213 votes, respectively. Henderson and Lee were thus declared elected, and the incumbent Forsaith was beaten by two votes.

Henderson represented the electorate in the 2nd Parliament from October 1855 to his resignation on 30 March 1860. He won the resulting 23 May 1860 by-election and represented the electorate until its dissolution on 6 November 1860. He was elected again for the 3rd Parliament in January 1861, and the 4th Parliament in February 1866, but he resigned on 5 June 1867.

Thomas Macfarlane was elected on 1 July 1867, succeeding Henderson. James O'Neill resigned in 1869 and was succeeded by Harry Farnall.

=== Members of Parliament ===
Key

Independent

Election	Winners	
1853 election	Thomas Forsaith	Walter Lee
1855 election	Thomas Henderson	Walter Lee
1860 by-election	Thomas Henderson	Walter Lee
1861 election	Thomas Henderson	James O'Neill
1866 election	Thomas Henderson	James O'Neill
1867 by-election	Thomas Macfarlane	James O'Neill
1869 by-election	Thomas Macfarlane	Harry Farnall

== Election results ==
=== 1867 by-election ===
1867 Northern Division by-election
Party	Candidate	Votes	%	±%
Independent	Thomas Macfarlane	234	63.76	
Independent	Captain Isaac Cooper	133	36.24	
Turnout		367		
Majority		101	27.52	

=== 1853 election ===
1853 general election: Northern Division
Party	Candidate	Votes	%	±%
Independent	Thomas Forsaith	169	77.88	
Independent	Walter Lee	137	63.13	
Independent	Allan O'Neill	128	58.99	
Majority		9 (Note: Majority is difference between lowest winning poll (Lee – 137) and highest losing poll (O'Neill – 128).)	4.15	
Turnout		217 (Note: As electors had two votes each, turnout is assumed to be the sum of votes divided by two.)	58.33	
Registered electors		372		

Table footnotes:
