= 1858 City of Auckland by-election =

New Zealand by-election

The City of Auckland by-election 1858 was a by-election held in the City of Auckland electorate during the 2nd New Zealand Parliament, on 27 April 1858.

The by-election was caused by the resignation of incumbent MP John Campbell and was won by Thomas Forsaith on a show of hands.
