= Harry Farnall =

New Zealand politician (1838–1891)

New Zealand Parliament
Years	Term	Electorate	Party
1869–1870	4th	Northern Division	Independent
1871–1872	5th	Rodney	Independent

Harry Warner Farnall (18 December 1838 – 5 June 1891) was a New Zealand politician, emigration agent and labour reformer. He was a Member of Parliament from Auckland.

He was born in Burley Park, Hampshire, England, on 18 December 1838.

He represented the Northern Division electorate from 1869 to 1870, and then the Rodney electorate from 1871 to 1872, when he resigned.

Farnall contested the 1886 Waitemata by-election and was beaten by Richard Monk. He contested the 1890 election in the City of Auckland electorate. Of seven candidates, he came last.

New Zealand Parliament
Preceded by James O'Neill	Member of Parliament for Northern Division; 1869–1870; Served alongside: Thomas Macfarlane	Constituency abolished
