= James O'Neill (New Zealand politician) =

New Zealand politician

The Honourable James O'Neill (1819–1882) was born in Manorhamilton, County Leitrim, Ireland. In Ireland, he trained as an apothecary but then emigrated to New Zealand, arriving in 1840. There, he became a significant 19th-century politician.

== New Zealand ==
New Zealand Parliament
| Years | Term | Electorate | Party |
|---|---|---|---|
| 1853–1855 | 1st | City of Auckland | Independent |
| 1861–1866 | 3rd | Northern Division | Independent |
| 1866–1869 | 4th | Northern Division | Independent |

O'Neill was first elected to the Auckland provincial council in July 1853, representing the City of Auckland. That same year O'Neill was elected as a member of the New Zealand House of Representatives in the 1st Parliament, the 3rd Parliament and the 4th Parliament. He represented two different Auckland seats. First, he was the member of the City of Auckland from 1853 until he was defeated in 1855. He then represented the Northern Division (the area between Auckland and Whangārei) from 1861 to 1869.

In 1862, O'Neill and his oldest child Mary O'Neill were passengers on the SS White Swan together with the prime minister and several other senior members of the New Zealand government. The ship was holed by a rock while steaming from Napier to Wellington and began sinking. Captain Allen Harper deliberately ran the ship aground and thereby saved the lives of all those on board.

O'Neill resigned his House of Representatives seat in 1869 and was appointed a member of the New Zealand Legislative Council, the Upper House of the New Zealand Parliament. In addition to serving in both houses of the New Zealand Parliament, O'Neill was also a founding director of the Bank of New Zealand, and a justice of the peace.

== Later life ==
He resigned his Legislative Council seat in 1872 and returned to the British Isles where he died at Southsea, England, in 1882 aged 65

New Zealand Parliament
| Preceded by Walter Lee | Member of Parliament for Northern Division; 1861–1869; Served alongside: Thomas Henderson, Thomas Macfarlane | Succeeded by Harry Farnall |
