= Thomas Macfarlane =

New Zealand politician

New Zealand Parliament
Years	Term	Electorate	Party
1867–1870	4th	Northern Division	Independent

Thomas Macfarlane (1811–1885) was a 19th-century Member of Parliament from the Auckland Region, New Zealand.

He represented the Northern Division electorate from 1867 to 1870, when he retired. He was the business partner of Thomas Henderson.

New Zealand Parliament
Preceded by Thomas Henderson	Member of Parliament for Northern Division; 1867–1870; Served alongside: James O'Neill, Harry Farnall	Constituency abolished
