= Alfred Christopher Picard =

New Zealand politician

Member of the New Zealand Parliament for Motueka and Massacre Bay
- In office 18 August 1853 – 15 September 1855

Personal details
- Born: 24 May 1824 London, England
- Died: 17 September 1855 (aged 31) Motueka, New Zealand
- Profession: Solicitor, politician

Alfred Christopher Picard (24 May 1824 – 17 September 1855) was a 19th-century New Zealand politician.

Picard was born in London in 1824. He arrived in New Zealand in 1848 with the Ajax and first settled in Nelson. By 1853, he was living in Riwaka near Motueka, with his profession listed as solicitor. He married Mary Ann Askew on 10 July 1850 and they had two sons; William Alfred and John Thomas.

New Zealand Parliament
Years	Term	Electorate	Party
1853–1855	1st	Motueka and Massacre Bay	Independent

On 18 August 1853, Picard and Samuel Stephens contested the Motueka and Massacre Bay electorate for a seat in the 1st New Zealand Parliament, which Picard won by 44 votes to 32. On the following day, Picard was one of three candidates for the two seats for the Motueka District in the Nelson Provincial Council. At 12 noon, Picard withdrew from the election and the other two candidates, Samuel Stephens and Charles Parker, were thus elected.

On 31 July 1855, an additional member was to be elected for the Nelson Provincial Council. Picard was the only candidate and was declared returned unopposed. When the House of Representatives started its third session in early August 1855, James Mackay read a letter from Picard who was asking for a month's leave, but upon protest from Picard's adversary, William Travers, leave was denied. The third parliamentary session was short and parliament, at the time based in Auckland, was dissolved on 15 September 1855 without Picard having attended this session.

On 17 September 1855, Picard died in Motueka from heart failure. He had never taken his seat at the Provincial Council, which would next meet in January 1856. Picard was described as a "man of considerable culture and education and a brilliant speaker."

== Notes ==
New Zealand Parliament
New constituency	Member of Parliament for Motueka and Massacre Bay; 1853–1855	Succeeded by Charles Parker
