= J. Valentine Smith =

New Zealand politician

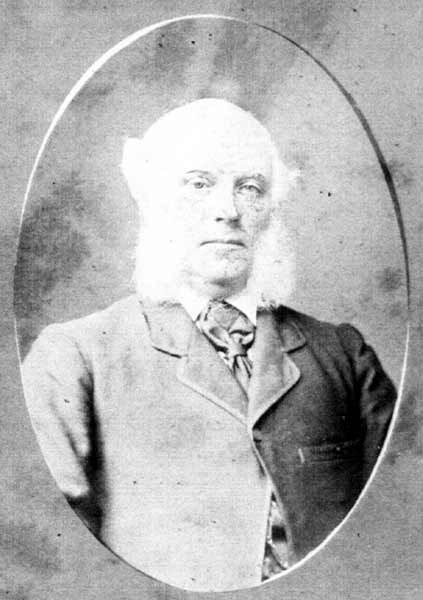
Portrait of John Valentine Smith

John Valentine Smith (1824 – 10 February 1895) was a New Zealand landowner, militia leader, and politician.

== Biography ==
New Zealand Parliament
Years	Term	Electorate	Party
1855–1858	2nd	Wairarapa and Hawke's Bay	Independent

Smith was born in 1824 at Malta, where his father was with the Admiralty. Smith received his education at public schools in England.

He was involved in Charles Enderby's scheme in the late 1840s of turning the Auckland Islands into a Crown colony for Britain. Enderby held the Queen's commission as Lieutenant-governor, and Smith as Enderby's secretary thus filled the role of colonial secretary. They sailed for the Auckland Islands from Hobart in November 1849 on the Samuel Enderby. The scheme was unsuccessful and abandoned after just over two years.

Smith was a significant figure in the Wairarapa region, owning the prominent Lansdowne, Annedale, and Mataikona runs. He was elected on 26 November 1855 to represent the Wairarapa and Hawke's Bay electorate in the 2nd New Zealand Parliament, but resigned on 10 March 1858 before the end of his term. He did not serve in any subsequent Parliaments.

Smith was also the leader of the local militia, holding the rank of major. In the 1860s, he gained attention for his push to construct a stockade at Masterton to defend against possible Māori attack. Many people, including Isaac Featherston, the Superintendent of Wellington Province, believed that the construction of stockade would make conflict more likely, but after much work, Smith was able to convince the government to fund the project. The construction, however, was plagued with difficulties, and the final result was unsatisfactory. The stockade never saw action, and has been termed "Major Smith's Folly."

In circa 1883, Smith relocated to Pātea, where he died on 10 February 1895.

His son, Harold Smith, was a member of the 19th Parliament.
