= Charles Parker (New Zealand politician) =

New Zealand politician and carpenter (1809–1898)

Charles Parker JP

Member of the New Zealand Parliament for Motueka and Massacre Bay
- In office 8 Nov 1855 – 1856

Member of the New Zealand Parliament for Motueka
- In office 2 Mar 1866 – 21 Oct 1875

Personal details
- Born: 4 March 1809 Newent, Gloucestershire, England
- Died: 29 June 1898 (aged 89) Motueka, New Zealand
- Party: Independent

Charles Parker JP (4 March 1809 – 29 June 1898) was a New Zealand politician and a carpenter.

== Early life ==
Parker was born at Newent, Gloucestershire, England, on 4 March 1809. His parents were Sarah Potter (17 November 1783 – 16 July 1876), a weaver, and her husband, Edmund Parker (2 November 1767 – 7 November 1853), a builder. Charles was raised in his mother's home town of Cheltenham, Gloucester. He trained as carpenter and builder. On 6 April 1837, he married his first cousin Hannah Phipps (22 June 1815 – 14 December 1889) in Cheltenham, Gloucestershire.

== Emigration to New Zealand ==
In 1849 Charles, Hannah and six children sailed on the Kelso to Nelson, New Zealand. The family settled in Motueka, where Charles was soon successful in business, becoming a property developer as well as a builder. He paid for other members of the family to immigrate; Sarah Parker, his 73-year-old mother, arrived in 1856, and by 1859 five of his brothers and sisters had emigrated with their families.

Parker had become involved in the political life of the colony. He was a member of the Volunteer Reserves and a justice of the peace. He was active in the Anglican Church until the mid-1860s, when his infant son Henry died before he was baptised, and the Anglican priest refused to bury him in consecrated ground. The local Methodist minister agreed to do so, and the family switched churches.

== Political career ==
New Zealand Parliament
Years	Term	Electorate	Party
1855–1856	2nd	Motueka and Massacre Bay	Independent
1866–1870	4th	Motueka	Independent
1871–1875	5th	Motueka	Independent

In 1853 Parker was elected to the Nelson Provincial Council as member for Motueka and Massacre Bay, a seat which he held until 1857. He then represented Motueka (1857–69 and 1873–76). He was elected a member of the 2nd New Zealand Parliament as member for Motueka and Massacre Bay (1855–56), resigning in 1856, and later re-elected as member for the renamed Motueka for the 4th and 5th parliaments (1866–75). Parker was a populist opposed to the class system and supported John Robinson's programme of liberalising land purchase to prevent the establishment of large landholdings or latifundia.

Parker's local political rival was David Monro, who championed the more conservative 'Supper Party' and large run holders. In a controversial 1871 election, a recount found Parker and Munro had split the vote equally; the returning officer's casting vote returned Monro as MP, but this was overturned following a petition, and Parker was declared elected.

== Family ==
Parker retired to pursue business interests; by 1882 he owned 53 acres (21 ha) of land in Waimea County, valued at £550. He died on 29 June 1898 in Motueka as a man who had become moderately wealthy. A newspaper obituary describes him as having "retained his mental faculties till the last". Charles and Hannah had 13 children: Charles (1838–1903), Frederick (1839–1905, married Anne Jane Sutcliffe), Elizabeth (1840–1912, married Thomas Boyes), Henry (1842–1866), Ellen (1844–1845), Edward (1845–1845), Walter (1846–1911), Thirza Ann (1849–1929, married Robert William Skilton), Edmund (1851–1923, married Annie Morris), Emily (1853–1923), Jessie (1855–1904), Arthur William (1857–1946, married Eliza Jane Wilson), and Horace (1859–1867).

He was buried at Motueka cemetery on 2 July 1898. His wife Hannah died 14 December 1889, and is also buried at Motueka cemetery.

Their gravestone reads:

Our father and mother

Charles PARKER died 29 June 1898 aged 90 years
Hannah PARKER died 14 December 1889 aged 75 years

also our sister Jessie PARKER died 6 December 1904 aged 49 years.

New Zealand Parliament
Preceded by Alfred Christopher Picard	Member of Parliament for Motueka and Massacre Bay; 1855–1856	Succeeded by Herbert Curtis
Preceded by Herbert Curtis	Member of Parliament for Motueka; 1866–1870; 1871–1875	Succeeded by David Monro
Preceded by David Monro	Member of Parliament for Motueka; 1866–1870; 1871–1875	Succeeded by Richmond Hursthouse
