= William C Daldy =

Early 20th c. tugboat

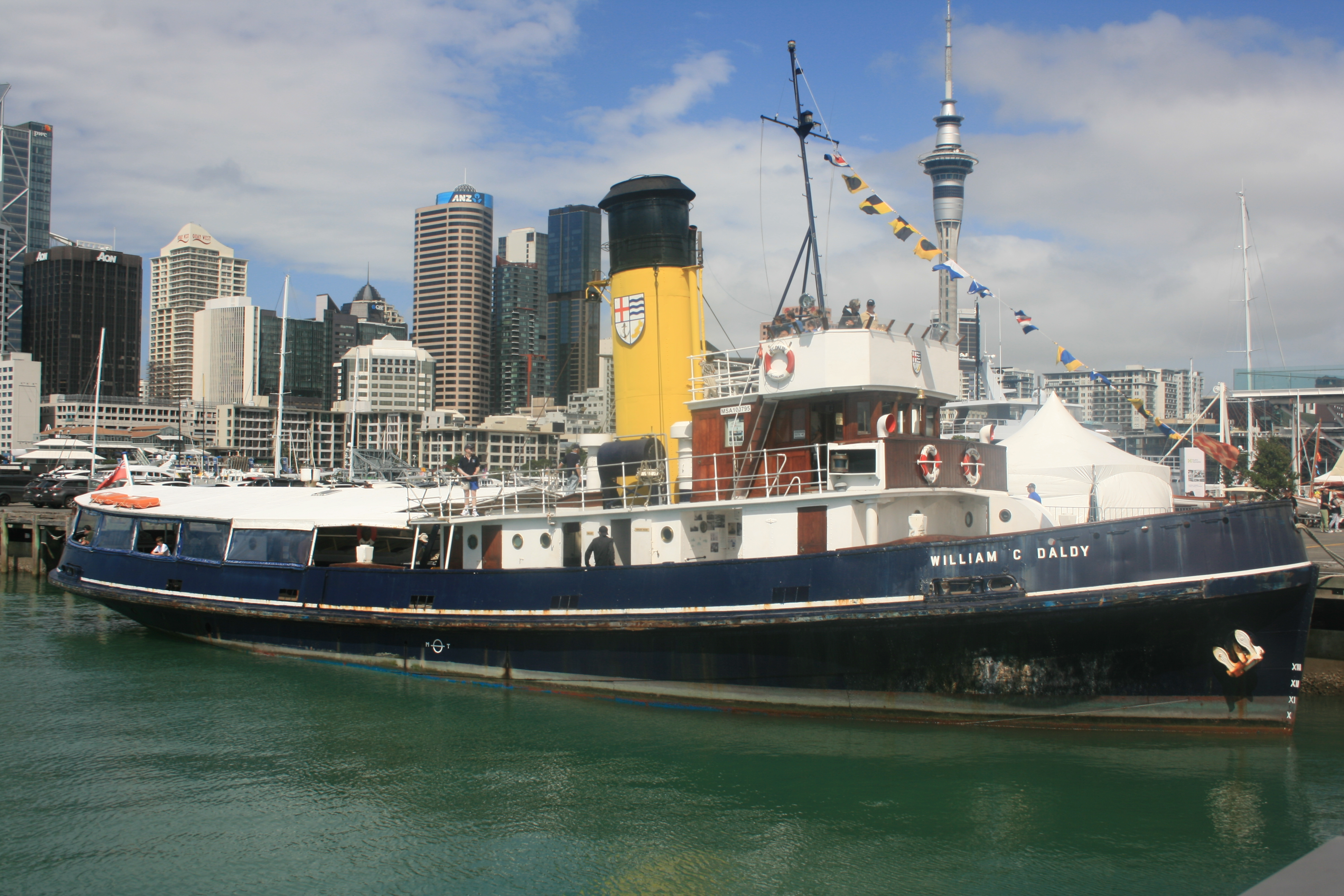
- William C Daldy in 2026

History

New Zealand
- Name: William C Daldy
- Namesake: William Daldy
- Owner: 1935–1977 Auckland Harbour Board; from 1977 William C Daldy Preservation Society
- Port of registry: Auckland, New Zealand
- Builder: Lobnitz & Company, Renfrew
- Yard number: 986
- Launched: 1 October 1935
- Completed: 1935
- Commissioned: February 1936
- Identification: IMO number: 5390345; Official Number: 157787; Call sign: ZM2060
- Status: In service

General characteristics
- Type: Tugboat
- Tonnage: 346 GRT 323 GT
- Length: 126 ft (38.4 m)
- Beam: 34.6 ft (10.5 m)
- Draft: 15 ft (4.6 m)
- Installed power: 1,960 ihp
- Propulsion: 2 x coal-fired steam engines, with 3 furnaces each
- Speed: 13 knots (24 km/h; 15 mph)
- Boats & landing craft carried: 1
- Crew: 10

William C Daldy is a historic steam-powered tugboat operating on the Waitematā Harbour, in Auckland, New Zealand. Named after William Crush Daldy, an Auckland politician, she was built in 1935 and is still an active vessel, maintained by an enthusiast preservation society which charters her out for functions and cruises.

== History ==
The tug was built in 1935 by Lobnitz & Company in Renfrew, Scotland for the Auckland Harbour Board. She has a bollard pull of about 17 tons, and is fired by two coal-burning boilers, making her one of the strongest such tugs still afloat.

In 1958, she prevented one of the pre-assembled main sections of the Auckland Harbour Bridge (then just being constructed over the Waitematā Harbour) from being damaged or lost in a major storm. Strong winds had come up as a construction barge was floating the 1,200-ton structure section into place, and manoeuvring boats were unable to keep it under control. The William C Daldy took up station and kept up the pull for over 36 uninterrupted hours before the wind subsided, burning 40 tons of coal.

The harbour board were intending in 1977 to dispose of the tug for scrapping, but she was instead leased in 1978 (and in 1989 purchased for $1) by an enthusiast organisation, the William C Daldy Preservation Society, which subsequently kept her in working trim, hiring her out for functions and charter cruises. Latterly the vessel was docked in Viaduct Harbour in Auckland city centre, though she had a number of berths around the harbour over time.

In May 2023, it was revealed that, following a period of reduced income and maintenance during the COVID-19 pandemic and subsequently, the cost of survey and repairs to maintain her seaworthiness and certification to carry passengers in September would be about NZ$1 million, requiring urgent funding support.
