= Wairarapa and Hawke's Bay (electorate) =

Wairarapa and Hawke's Bay is a former parliamentary electorate in the Wellington Region of New Zealand from 1853 to 1859, when it was extended into previously unincorporated territories, split in two, and replaced by the County of Hawke, with its southern portion being the newly created Wairarapa electorate. It is the first general electorate to have been abolished in New Zealand.

== Population centres ==
The New Zealand Constitution Act 1852, passed by the British government, allowed New Zealand to establish a representative government. The initial 24 New Zealand electorates were defined by Governor George Grey in March 1853. Wairarapa and Hawke's Bay was one of the initial single-member electorates.

The electorate comprised six separate areas. The Wairarapa area was by far the largest, and there were settlements in Featherston, Carterton, and Masterton. Further north along the east coast, there were two small areas at Cape Turnagain. Further north again, there were three more areas: the first had the settlements of Waipawa and Waipukurau, the second included Napier, and the third area contained the Mohaka River.

The Constitution Act also allowed the House of Representatives to establish new electorates and make changes to existing electorates, and this was first done through 'The Electoral Districts Act, 1858'. At that time, four new electorates were formed by splitting existing electorates, and the previously unincorporated land in the North Island was assigned to various electorates. The Wairarapa and Hawke's Bay electorate gained a large area and was split into two areas: the County of Hawke in the north and the Wairarapa electorate in the south.

== History ==
Samuel Revans was the first representative of the Wairarapa and Hawke's Bay electorate during the term of the 1st Parliament. J. Valentine Smith was the second representative. He was elected in the 1855 election and resigned on 10 March 1858.

In the 22 July 1858 by-election, James Burne Ferguson was elected unopposed. Ferguson as the incumbent was automatically transferred to the County of Hawke electorate in 1859, and a by-election was held to fill the position in the Wairarapa electorate, which was won by Charles Carter. The Wairarapa and Hawke's Bay electorate was thus the first general electorate to be abolished in 1859.

=== Members of Parliament ===
The electorate was represented by three Members of Parliament.

Key

Independent

Election	Winner
1853 election	Samuel Revans
1855 election	J. Valentine Smith
1858 by-election	James Ferguson
(Electorate abolished in 1859, see Wairarapa and County of Hawke)
