= Thomas Henderson (New Zealand politician) =

New Zealand politician

The Honourable Thomas Henderson
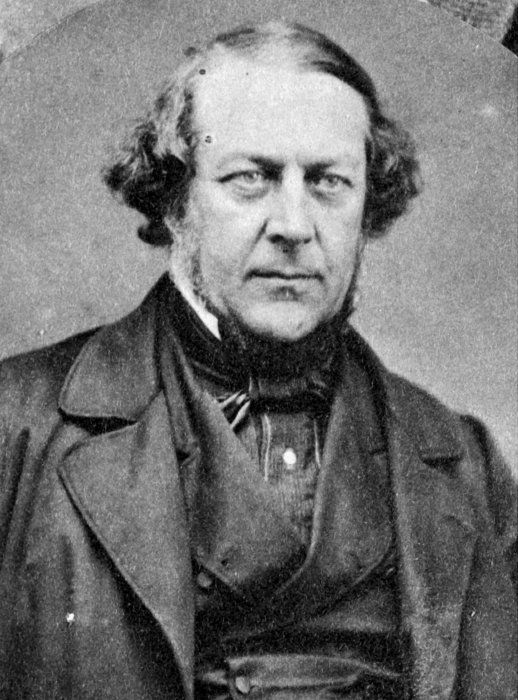
- Thomas Henderson in 1860

New Zealand Legislative Council
- In office 25 July 1878 – 27 June 1886

Member of the New Zealand Parliament for Northern Division
- In office 27 October 1855 – 5 June 1867

Member of the New Zealand Parliament for Waitemata
- In office 8 February 1871 – 24 April 1874

Member of the Auckland Provincial Council
- In office 26 October 1855 – 18 August 1857
- In office 26 October 1855 – 26 November 1865

Personal details
- Born: 1810 Dundee, Scotland
- Died: 27 June 1886 (aged 75 or 76) Wellington, New Zealand
- Spouse: Catherine Macfarlane (m. 1834; died 1867)
- Relations: Thomas Macfarlane (brother-in-law)
- Profession: Politician, miller, trader, blacksmith

Thomas Maxwell Henderson (1810 – 27 June 1886) was a New Zealand politician. He was one of the earliest settlers in Auckland. He was a significant entrepreneur, and is the namesake of the Auckland suburb Henderson.

== Early life ==
Henderson was born in Dundee, Scotland, in 1810. He was a blacksmith by trade and served his time as an engineer and machine maker. He met the Macfarlane siblings in Perth, Scotland; John, Henry and Catherine (1811–1867). He married Catherine in 1834.

A family conference consisting all the above plus Ann Taylor (née Macfarlane) and her husband decided that they would answer to the advertisements for tradesmen and women to emigrate to New Zealand. They left Gravesend near London on 13 August 1840 on the barque London, arriving in Port Nicholson (Wellington) on 12 December. George Henderson, their 15 months old son, had died on the voyage. The Henderson and Macfarlane families went north, heading for Auckland.

== Professional career ==
Henderson and his brother-in-law John Macfarlane entered into a professional partnership in 1842, beginning by selling general merchandise and goods for ships. The Henderson & Macfarlane business later grew to include kauri timber milling and shipping, under the name Pacific Island Traders (later known as the Circular Saw Line). In 1844, Henderson & Macfarlane purchased 18,000 acres of West Auckland from Ngāti Whātua in return for goods and a schooner, the Lucy Dunn, however the government voided the land sale shortly after, when it was decreed that all purchases of Māori land needed to be done through the central government. In response, Henderson & Macfarlane sought permission from Governor George Grey in 1847 to mill kauri in the vicinity of the Te Wai-o-Pareira / Henderson Creek, Henderson Valley and Waitākere Ranges. Henderson built a sawmill near the conjunction of the Opanuku Stream and Oratia Stream in 1848, around which developed a community, the Henderson's Mill Settlement, which became the modern-day suburb of Henderson. When the land became available to purchase from the government in 1853, Henderson & Macfarlane were one of the largest purchasers.

He built the Commercial Hotel on the corner of High Street and Shortland Street in the Auckland CBD at a cost of £2000, and it was at the time considered the most pretentious building in Auckland. In 1858, the hotel was destroyed in a fire, and replaced with a brick building. During the Flagstaff War, he employed about 300 Māori in gumdigging and was credited by other colonists as keeping them from joining Hōne Heke.

John Macfarlane died of a heart attack in 1860, and his place in the company was taken by his elder brother Thomas Macfarlane. The Henderson & Macfarlane company continued to develop; by the year 1865, the Circular Saw Line fleet had 39 vessels. Henderson's Mill closed in the latter 1860s, however the community that developed around the area remained. The fleet traded to Australia, China and America. The company also engaged in coconut plantation operations and trading in copra. In 1897 the company merged its trading and plantation business with that of the trading and plantation firm of John T. Arundel, to form the Pacific Islands Company Ltd. The company was based in London with its trading activities in the Pacific.

Henderson assisted in establishing the Bank of New Zealand, the New Zealand Loan and Mercantile Agency Company, the New Zealand Insurance Company and the Auckland Gas Company.

== Political career ==
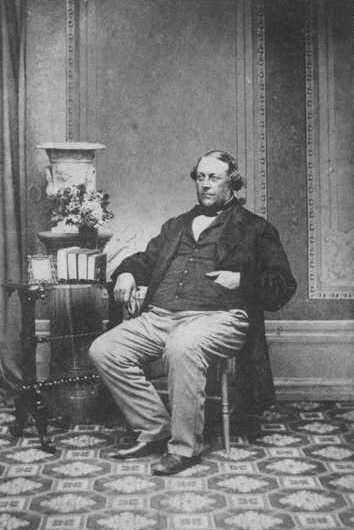
Undated photograph of Henderson

New Zealand Parliament
Years	Term	Electorate	Party
1855–1860	2nd	Northern Division	Independent
1860	2nd	Northern Division	Independent
1861–1866	3rd	Northern Division	Independent
1866–1867	4th	Northern Division	Independent
1871–1874	5th	Waitemata	Independent

Henderson was first elected to the Auckland Provincial Council in the City of Auckland electorate on 26 October 1855. He served on the second Council until 18 August 1857. From 26 November 1855 to 10 November 1856, he was a member of the Executive Council. He served another period on the fifth Provincial Council, from 26 November 1865 to 5 June 1867, representing the Northern Division electorate.

He represented the Northern Division electorate in the 2nd Parliament from 27 October 1855 to his resignation on 30 March 1860. He won the resulting 23 May 1860 by-election and continued representing the electorate for the remaining five months of the parliament's term.

He was elected again for the 3rd Parliament in January 1861, and the 4th Parliament in February 1866, but he resigned on 5 June 1867. He then represented the Waitemata electorate in the 5th Parliament from February 1871 to 24 April 1874, when he again resigned.

He was a minister without portfolio in the 1861–62 government of William Fox. At the instance of Sir George Grey, who at the time was Premier, he was appointed to the Legislative Council on 25 July 1878 and served until his death in 1886.

== Other activities ==
Henderson imported Chinese pheasants (Phasianus colchicus torquatus) in 1851 and released them on his property. Around the same time, Walter Brodie imported English pheasants (Phasianus colchicus) and released them at Mongonui. Henderson imported another lot of Chinese pheasants in 1856. Pheasants became common game birds in the North Island.

== Death and commemoration ==
Henderson suffered a paralytic stroke on 19 June 1886, and died at the residence of George Graham in Wellington on Sunday, 27 June 1886. His body was transferred to Auckland on the SS Penguin and buried in Symonds Street Cemetery beside his wife. The Auckland suburb of Henderson is named after Thomas Henderson. Catherine Street in the centre of Henderson is named after his wife. All central Henderson streets were once named after members of the family (e.g. Thomas, Henry, John, Mary and George), but they have either been renamed or removed.

Henderson donated land for a turf club in 1876. The land is these days occupied by the Plumer Domain and Henderson High School.

== Notes ==
New Zealand Parliament
Preceded by Thomas Forsaith	Member of Parliament for Northern Division; 1855–1867; Served alongside: Walter Lee, James O'Neill	Succeeded by Thomas Macfarlane
New constituency	Member of Parliament for Waitemata; 1871–1874	Succeeded by Gustav von der Heyde
