= Auckland Harbour Board =

Coordinates: 36.843774°S 174.776859°E

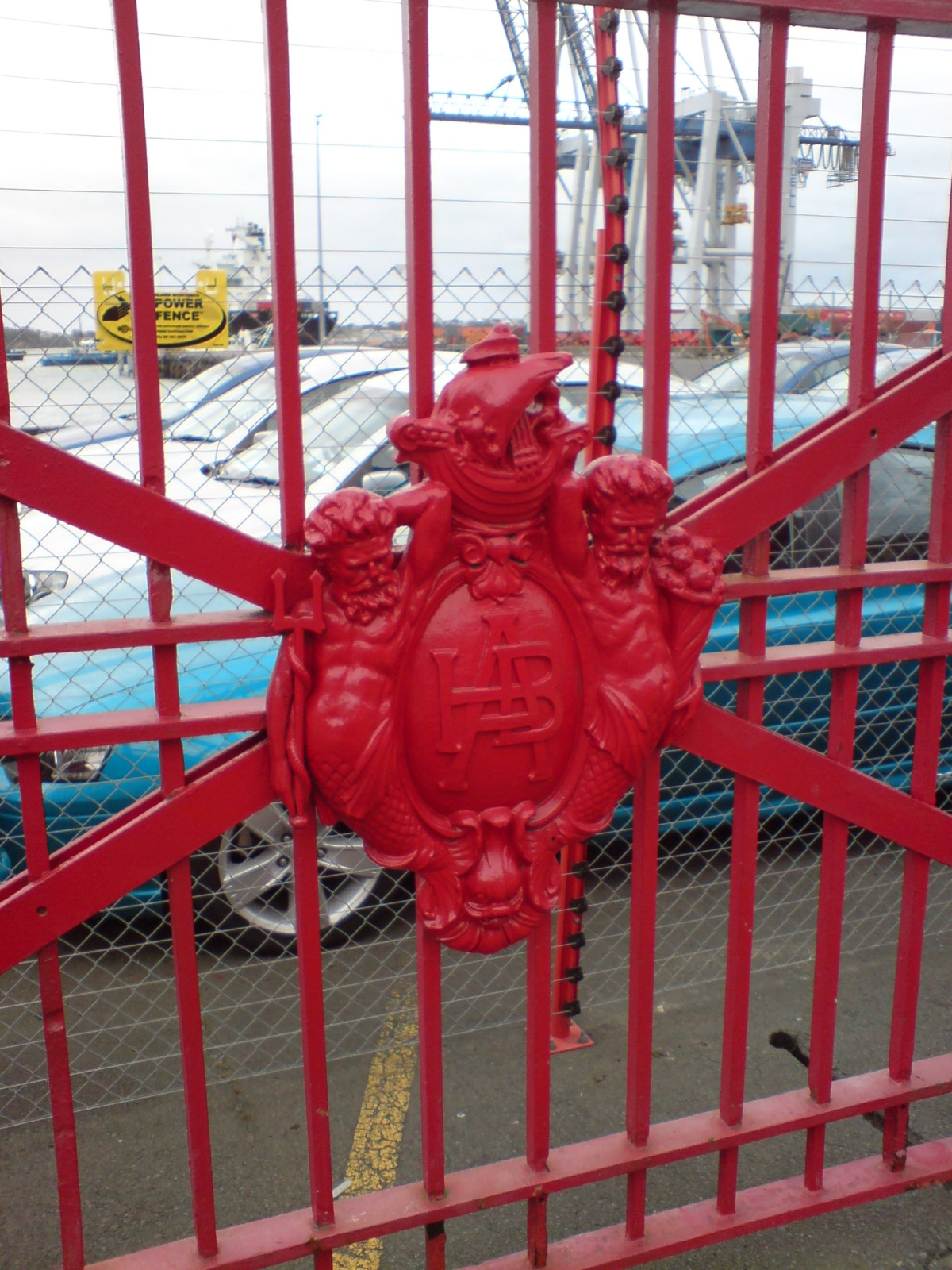
Auckland Harbour Board seal on the customs border gate

The Auckland Harbour Board was a public body that operated the ports of both Auckland and Onehunga from 1871 to 1988 and was dissolved in 1989. Its successor organisation is Ports of Auckland, which assumed the possessions and responsibilities of the Harbour Board.

== History ==
The first Auckland Harbour Board was established in 1854 but was abolished in 1856 due to poor finances and a lack of support for the board.

In 1871 the Auckland Harbour Board was created by government ordinance and took over running Auckland's port from the Auckland Provincial Government. The harbour board offices were situated on the reclaimed ground at the lower end of Albert Street. Initially, the board consisted of thirteen members, who were elected by various interests for a period of two years. The chairman was elected by the members annually. In its first year, the revenue of the board was £12,498. By 1889 revenue had grown to £46,089, with the arrival of 2,441 sailing vessels and 3,756 steamers with a combined total tonnage of 980,816 tons.

Initially the Auckland Harbour Board's activities were exclusive to Waitematā Harbour before expanding the scope of its operations south to Manukau Harbour.

== See also ==
- Ports of Auckland
- 1989 local government reforms
- William C. Daldy
