= Walter Lee (New Zealand politician) =

New Zealand politician

Dr Walter Lee (1811 – 29 January 1887) was a 19th-century New Zealand politician.

== Biography ==
New Zealand Parliament
Years	Term	Electorate	Party
1853–1855	1st	Northern Division	Independent
1855–1860	2nd	Northern Division	Independent

Lee arrived in New Zealand in 1842. He represented the Northern Division (a territory north of Auckland but south of Whangārei) in the 1st Parliament and the 2nd Parliament; serving from 1853 to 1860, when he retired.

A Catholic, Lee opposed the reading of prayers at the start of Parliament, saying that any prayer would have an inevitable bias towards one faith or another.

Lee also served on the Auckland Provincial Council, representing the Northern Division electorate in 1857 and 1858. He was chairman of the initial Auckland City Council. He fell ill with a chronic liver disease and a week later, on 29 January 1887, he died from peritonitis. He was survived by his wife.

== Notes ==
New Zealand Parliament
New constituency	Member of Parliament for Northern Division; 1853–1860; Served alongside: Thomas Forsaith, Thomas Henderson	Succeeded by James O'Neill
