= 1856–1861 Stafford ministry =

Former government of New Zealand

The First Stafford Ministry was the third responsible government to be formed in New Zealand, and the first to last more than a few weeks. It formed in June 1856, and lasted until July 1861. As the office of Premier had yet to be established, Edward Stafford served as head of the government, although initially Henry Sewell was the Minister who reported to the Governor.

== Background ==
Stafford defeated William Fox 18–17 in a confidence motion based on the latter's proposal to give the provinces the bulk of state funding. He thereafter resigned the Superintendency of Nelson Province and formed a ministry including Henry Sewell, who was soon sent to London to negotiate a loan, and the detail-oriented William Richmond. Sewell became alienated from the ministry during his long absence and resigned a couple of months after returning in 1859. Meanwhile, Stafford followed a centralist policy: the government allocated a portion of land sale revenue to the provinces, ensuring that once the bulk of Crown land was sold, the provincial governments would struggle to raise enough revenue to survive; they also passed the New Provinces Act, permitting the break-up of the existing units into smaller and less powerful provinces.

The other main feature of the first Stafford Government was Māori policy, which was reserved to the Governor with the Ministry only being permitted to offer advice. In light of the rise of the Kingitanga, the Ministry favoured Francis Dart Fenton's scheme to create self-governing constitutional institutions for Maori, but was countermanded by Governor Thomas Gore Browne and his advisor, Donald McLean. In 1860 the First Taranaki War broke out over land sales conducted by the Governor's officials, leading to criticism of the Ministry's role. At the start of the 1861 session, Fox moved a confidence motion in the midst of the ramp-up of tensions in the Waikato, and won by two votes.

== Ministers ==
The following members served in the Stafford Ministry:

Name	Image	Office	Term
Edward Stafford		Member of Executive Council	2 June 1856 – 12 July 1861
Edward Stafford		Colonial Secretary	4 November 1856 – 12 July 1861
Henry Sewell		Colonial Treasurer	2 June 1856 – 4 November 1856
Henry Sewell		Colonial Treasurer	25 February 1859 – 26 April 1859
Henry Sewell		Member of Executive Council	4 November 1856 – 26 April 1859
Henry Sewell		Commissioner of Customs	25 February 1859 – 26 April 1859
Frederick Whitaker, MLC		Attorney-General	2 June 1856 – 12 July 1861
William Richmond		Colonial Secretary	2 June 1856 – 4 November 1856
William Richmond		Colonial Treasurer	4 November 1856 – 25 February 1859
William Richmond		Colonial Treasurer	26 April 1859 – 12 July 1861
William Richmond		Minister for Native Affairs	27 August 1858 – 10 November 1860
William Richmond		Commissioner of Customs	1 January 1859 – 25 February 1859
William Richmond		Commissioner of Customs	26 April 1859 – 12 July 1861
William Richmond		Member of Executive Council	25 February 1859 – 12 July 1861
John Logan Campbell		Member of Executive Council	2 June 1856 – 24 November 1856
Henry Tancred, MLC		Member of Executive Council	5 August 1858 – 12 July 1861
Henry Tancred, MLC		Secretary for Crown Lands	19 August 1858 – 12 July 1861
Henry Tancred, MLC		Postmaster-General	3 November 1858 – 12 July 1861
Lt. Colonel Robert Wynyard, CB		Member of Executive Council	3 January 1854 – 1 November 1858
Col. Charles Emilius Gold		Member of Executive Council	3 November 1858 – 30 March 1861
Frederick Weld		Member of Executive Council	28 July 1860 – 12 July 1861
Frederick Weld		Minister for Native Affairs	10 November 1860 – 12 July 1861
Major-General Thomas Simson Pratt		Member of Executive Council	30 March 1861 – 22 April 1861
Lieut-General Duncan Cameron		Member of Executive Council	22 April 1861 – 6 August 1862

== See also ==
- New Zealand Government
