= Amey Daldy =

Feminist, benefactor

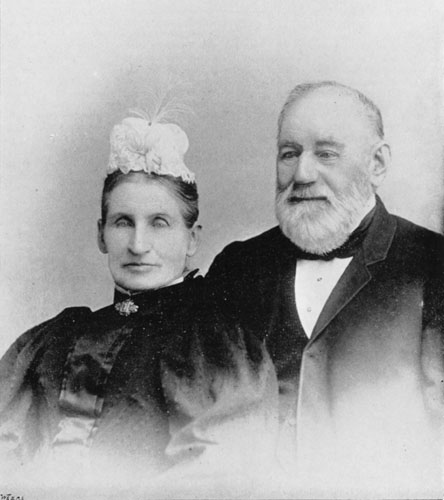
- Amey Daldy and husband William Daldy
- Born: Amey Hamerton c. 1829; Yarwell, Northamptonshire
- Died: 17 August 1920 (aged 91); Auckland, New Zealand
- Occupation: Suffragist
- Known for: Women's suffrage in New Zealand, Temperance movement, Women's rights
- Spouses: William Henry Smith (m. 1865; died 1879) William Daldy (m. 1880; died 1903)

Amey Daldy (née Hamerton, c. 1829 – 17 August 1920) was an English-born New Zealand feminist and suffragist. She was an important leader in the movement for women's suffrage in New Zealand, but later resigned as superintendent of the Auckland W.C.T.U. so that the League would not be associated with her other cause, the temperance movement.

== Early life ==
Born in Yarwell, Northamptonshire, Daldy sailed to New Zealand with her brother John on the Caduceus, arriving in Auckland on 11 October 1860. In 1865, she married William Henry Smith, a shoemaker, whilst running a 'ladies seminary' on Karangahape Road in Auckland. William Smith died in 1879 at the age of 62, and within a year Amey Daldy married Captain William Crush Daldy in Ōtāhuhu.

== Activism ==
As a founding member of the Auckland branch of the Women's Christian Temperance Union of New Zealand, Amey Daldy became a prominent voice of the suffragist movement in Auckland. At the first convention of the National Council of Women of New Zealand in 1896, Daldy was voted to represent the Auckland Branch of the Women's Political League. During her time representing various women's organisations in Auckland, Daldy's social policies focused primarily on financial independence for married women, opposition towards restrictive immigration, and legislative changes in the New Zealand Parliament.

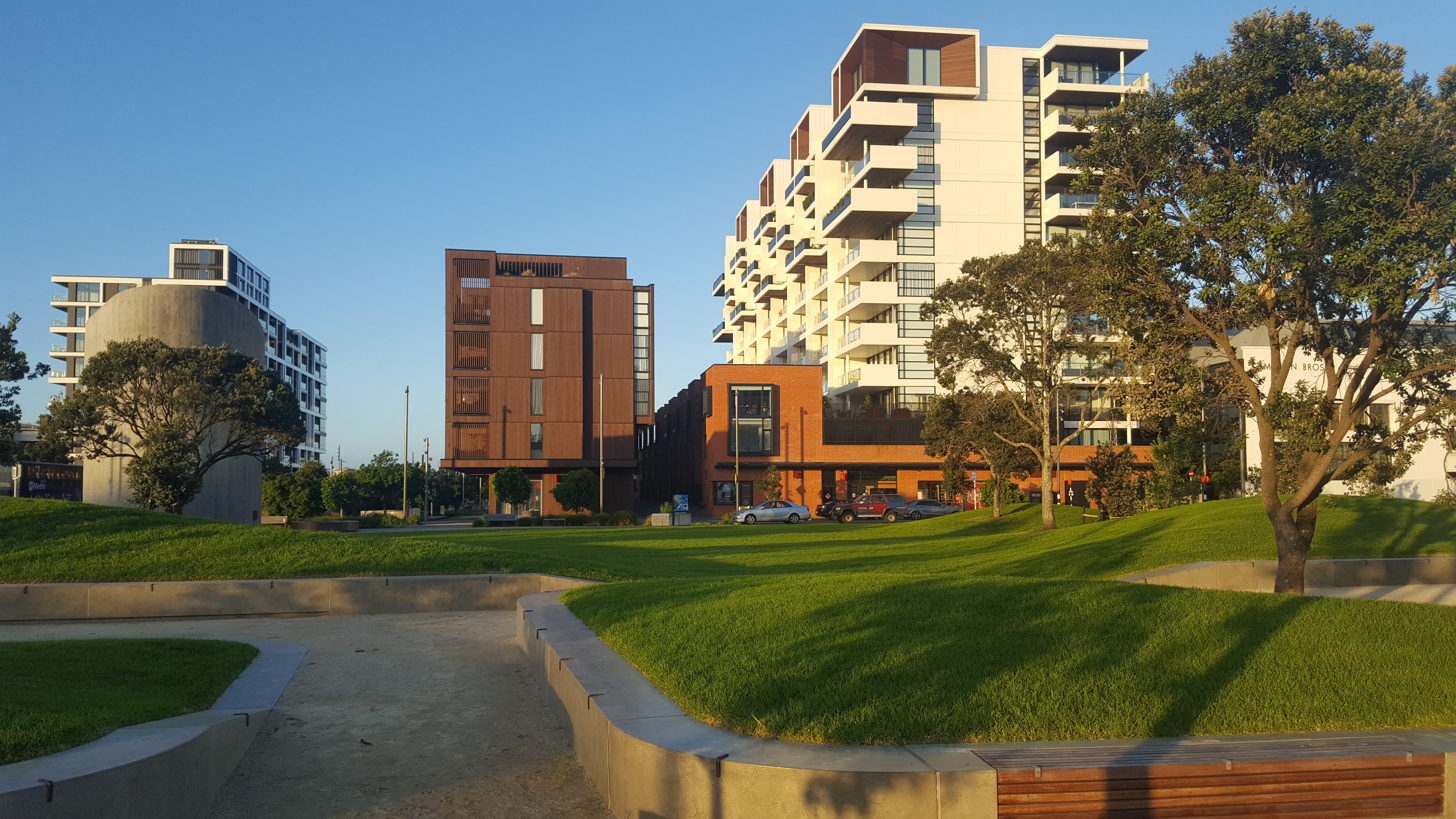
Amey Daldy Park and Wynyard Central apartments.

== Death ==
After a lengthy career as a suffragist and women's rights activist in New Zealand, Daldy retired from the public eye after suffering from a stroke in 1905. On 17 August 1920, Amey Daldy died, leaving financial legacies in her name to the New Zealand Congregational Ministers' Retiring Fund, the Salvation Army Rescue Fund, the Door of Hope Association, the Auckland YWCA, the NCW, and the WCTU NZ.

== Legacy ==
A public park in Wynyard Quarter, near Auckland's waterfront, has been named Amey Daldy Park. The park is alongside Daldy Street, which was named for her husband William Daldy.

== See also ==
- List of suffragists and suffragettes
- Timeline of women's suffrage
- Women's suffrage in New Zealand
- William Daldy
