= James Burne Ferguson =

New Zealand politician

New Zealand Parliament
Years	Term	Electorate	Party
1858–1860	2nd	Wairarapa and Hawke's Bay	Independent

James Burne Ferguson was a 19th-century Member of Parliament in New Zealand.

He represented the Wairarapa and Hawke's Bay electorate from 1858 to 1860, when he resigned. In the by-election on 22 July 1858, he was elected unopposed.
