= William Daldy =

New Zealand politician

Captain William Daldy
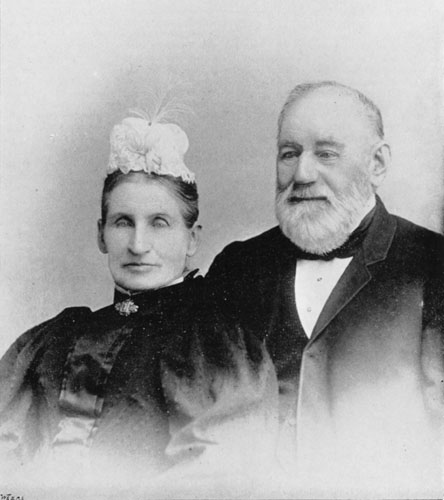
- William Daldy (right) with wife Amey Daldy

Member of Parliament
- In office 2nd New Zealand Parliament
- In office 1855–1860
- Constituency: City of Auckland

Inaugural Chairman of the Auckland Harbour Board
- In office 1871–1877

Member of the Auckland Provincial Council
- In office 1857, 1861–1864

Personal details
- Born: William Crush Daldy; 1816 Rainham, Essex, England
- Died: 5 October 1903 (aged 86–87) Ponsonby, Auckland, New Zealand
- Resting place: Purewa Cemetery
- Party: Independent
- Spouse: Frances Harriet Pulham (m. 1841; died 1877) Amey Daldy (m. 1880)

Military service
- Branch/service: Auckland Naval Volunteers
- Years of service: 1863–1864
- Rank: Senior Captain
- Battles/wars: Invasion of the Waikato

William Crush Daldy (1816 – 5 October 1903) was a captain and New Zealand politician.

== Biography ==
Daldy was born on 20 April 1816 in Rainham, Essex, England. He started going to sea aged 16 on the Mayflower, a ship belonging to his father Samuel Rootsey Daldy, an Ilford coal merchant. His seafaring first brought him to Auckland in July 1841.

On 10 December 1840 he sailed from Liverpool in his schooner Shamrock, arriving in Auckland in July 1841, but remained a seafarer. In 1847 he started timber milling near Auckland. From 1849 he was a partner in the shipping firm Combes and Daldy. He was a shareholder of Auckland Timber Co and his son, W C Daldy Jr., was its secretary.

In April 1864 the Daldy family sailed to London and in 1865 he became the English agent for the Province. They returned on Combes and Daldy's ship, Queen of the North, in 1866. Walter Combes died in 1870.

Captain Daldy was the first chairman of the Auckland Harbour Board from 1871. He was also a Justice of the Peace, Auckland Chamber of Commerce council member, Bank of New Zealand auditor, Auckland City Council member, New Zealand Insurance Co. director and volunteer fire brigade captain.

On 22 April 1841 Daldy married Frances Harriet Pulham, in Launceston. She died on 3 December 1877. They had 4 children, Frances Catherine Wrigley (25 April 1842-19 June 1879), Maryanne Maria Mee Davies (7 August 1848 – 24 June 1926), Edith Crush Daldy (1850-6 February 1924) and William Crush Daldy Jr (14 February 1852-1934).

William married Amey, née Hamerton, on 17 March 1880. Amey was president of Auckland branch of the Women's Franchise League and of the National Council of Women, and William gave a speech saying, "that men were cowards for not extending the franchise to women". Amey died in 1920.

Daldy died in Ponsonby, Auckland, on 5 October 1903. He had been in poor health for some time, before succumbing to pleurisy and dying of heart failure. He was buried at Purewa Cemetery.

== Political and military career ==
New Zealand Parliament
Years	Term	Electorate	Party
1855–1860	2nd	City of Auckland	Independent

He represented the City of Auckland electorate in the 2nd New Zealand Parliament from 1855 to 1860, when he was defeated. He did not serve in any subsequent Parliaments. He was a minister without portfolio in the government of William Fox, and was also a member of the Auckland Provincial Council in 1857 and from 1861 to 1864. During the invasion of the Waikato in 1863 he was a senior captain of the Auckland Naval Volunteers.

== See also ==
- William C Daldy, a historical Auckland steam tugboat named after him
