= Thomas Beckham =

New Zealand politician

New Zealand Parliament
Years	Term	Electorate	Party
1855–1859	2nd	City of Auckland	Independent

Thomas Beckham (1810 – 31 July 1875) was a 19th-century New Zealand politician. He represented the City of Auckland electorate in the 2nd New Zealand Parliament from 1855 to 1859, but resigned before the end of his term and did not serve in any subsequent Parliament. He was also a member of the Auckland Provincial Council, representing the City of Auckland electorate in 1855–1856. During most of that time, he was a member of the Auckland Executive Council.
