= Marwood (surname) =

Marwood is a surname. It originates from either the Norman French word 'malreward', a nickname given to someone who 'casts an evil eye' or the two places named Marwood in England. The first record of the name appears in the register of Rievaulx Abbey as Richard Malregard in 1170.

It may refer to:

- Alex Marwood, pseudonym of Serena Mackesy
- Anthony Marwood (b. 1979), British solo violinist
- Arthur Pierson Marwood (1868–1916), English mathematician upon whom the character of Christopher Tietjens was based
- Ben Marwood, English singer-songwriter
- Brian Marwood (b. 1960), English footballer
- Sir Edward Marwood-Elton, 1st Baronet (1800–1884)
- Sir George Marwood, 1st Baronet (1601–1680), English peer who served as High Sheriff of Yorkshire
- Sir Henry Marwood, 2nd Baronet (1635–1725), English peer, politician and Yorkshire landowner
- James Marwood (born 1990), English footballer
- Louise Marwood (born 1979), English actress and comedian
- William Marwood (1820–1883), British hangman
- William Francis Marwood (1863–1935), English peer and civil servant

== See also ==
- Marwood Baronets, title in the Baronetage of England
- Marwood-Elton Baronets, title in the Baronetage of England
