= Marwood =

Marwood may refer to:

== People ==
- Marwood (surname)
- Benedictus Marwood Kelly (1785–1867), British Admiral who rose to prominence in the Napoleonic Wars
- Edward Marwood-Elton, 1st Baronet (1800–1884), English barrister and peer
- Marwood Munden (1885–1952), English doctor, war hero and cricketer

== Places ==
- Marwood, Devon, England
- Marwood, County Durham, England

== Other uses ==
- Marwood baronets, of Little Bushby, created 1660
- The narrator of Withnail and I, called Marwood in the screenplay
