= Clifford baronets of Flaxbourne (1887) =

Escutcheon of the Clifford baronets of Flaxbourne

The Clifford baronetcy, of Flaxbourne in New Zealand was created on 16 July 1887 in the Baronetage of the United Kingdom for Charles Clifford, the first Speaker of the New Zealand House of Representatives. The title became extinct, with the death in 2025 of the 7th Baronet.

== Clifford baronets, of Flaxbourne (1887) ==
- Sir Charles Clifford, 1st Baronet (1813–1893)
- Sir George Hugh Charles Clifford, 2nd Baronet (1847–1930)
- Sir Charles Lewis Clifford, 3rd Baronet (1885–1938)
- Sir Walter Lovelace Clifford, 4th Baronet (1852–1944)
- Sir Lewis Arthur Joseph Clifford, 5th Baronet (1896–1970)
- Sir Roger Charles Joseph Gerard Clifford, 6th Baronet (1910–1982)
- Sir Roger Joseph Clifford, 7th Baronet (1936–2025)

There is no heir, according to Debrett's.

Baronetage of the United Kingdom
Preceded by Borthwick baronets	Clifford baronets of Flaxbourne; 16 July 1887	Succeeded by Evans baronets
