= George Marwood, 1st Baronet =

High Sheriff of Yorkshire Sir George Marwood
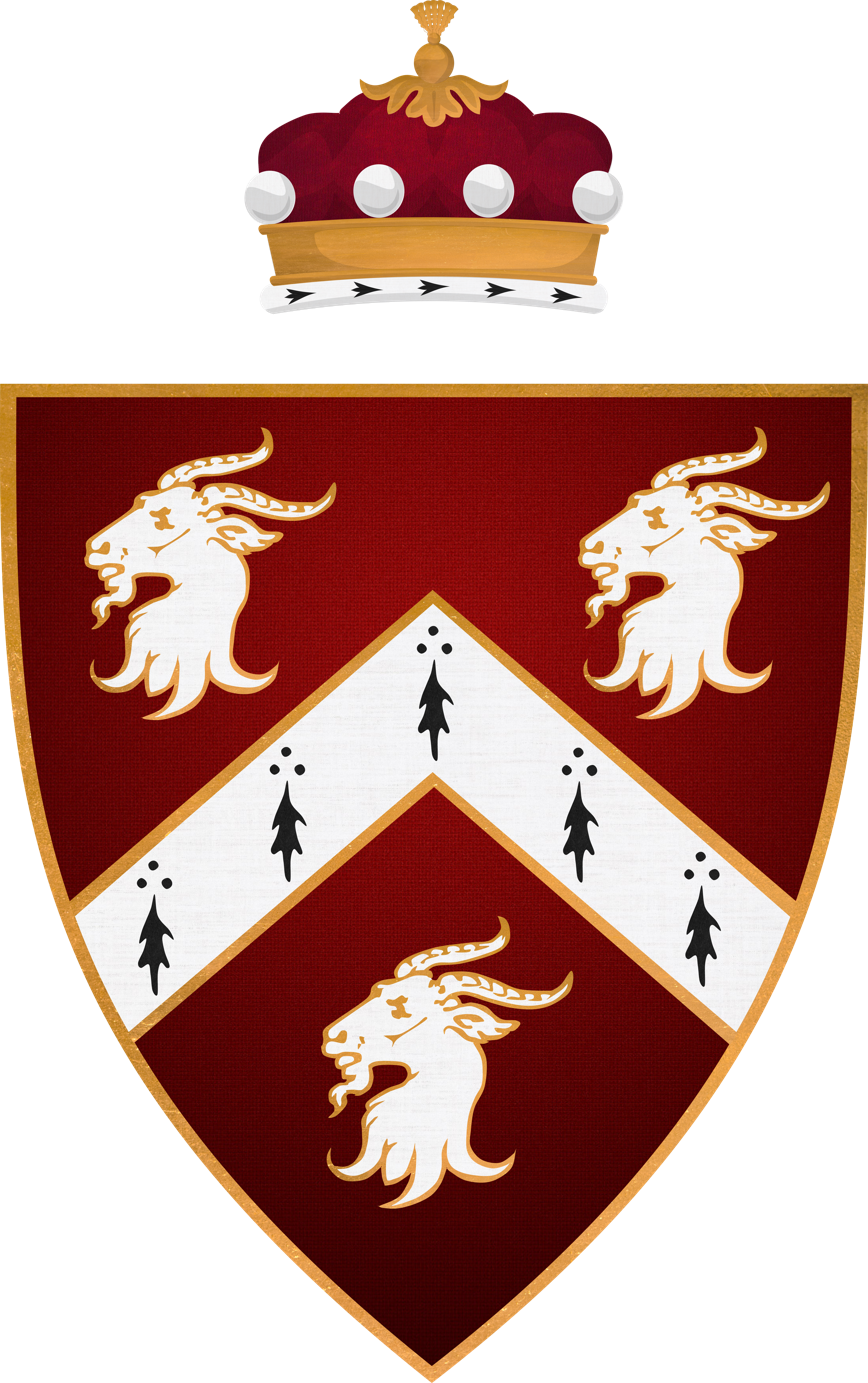
- Coat of Arms of Sir George Marwood
- Born: c. 1601; Stokesley, North Riding of Yorkshire
- Resting place: St Michael le Belfrey, York
- Education: Lincoln College, University of Oxford
- Title: 1st Baronet of Little Busby

Sir George Marwood was a Yorkshire landowner who served as the High Sheriff of Yorkshire in 1651 and was later elected as the Member of Parliament for Northallerton in 1660.

== Background ==
George Marwood was born in 1601 in Stokesley to Henry and Ann (née Constable) Marwood. His family had been seated at Busby Hall in Little Busby since 1587 and held further property at Wilberfoss, Acomb Grange and Sedbergh. The Marwoods were an ancient family who directly descended from Edward III. He was educated at Lincoln College, Oxford. He married Frances Bethell daughter of Sir Walter Bethell of Alne in 1627.

Marwood had three sons and three daughters:

- Sir Henry Marwood, 2nd Baronet
- George Marwood
- Barbara Marwood, married Sir Thomas Hebblethwaite M.P.
- Frances Marwood, married Sir Richard Weston
- Anne Marwood, married William Metcalfe

Baronetage of England
New creation	Baronet (of Little Busby); 1660–1680	Succeeded by Henry Marwood
