= Ward Beach =

Beach in New Zealand

- Beach
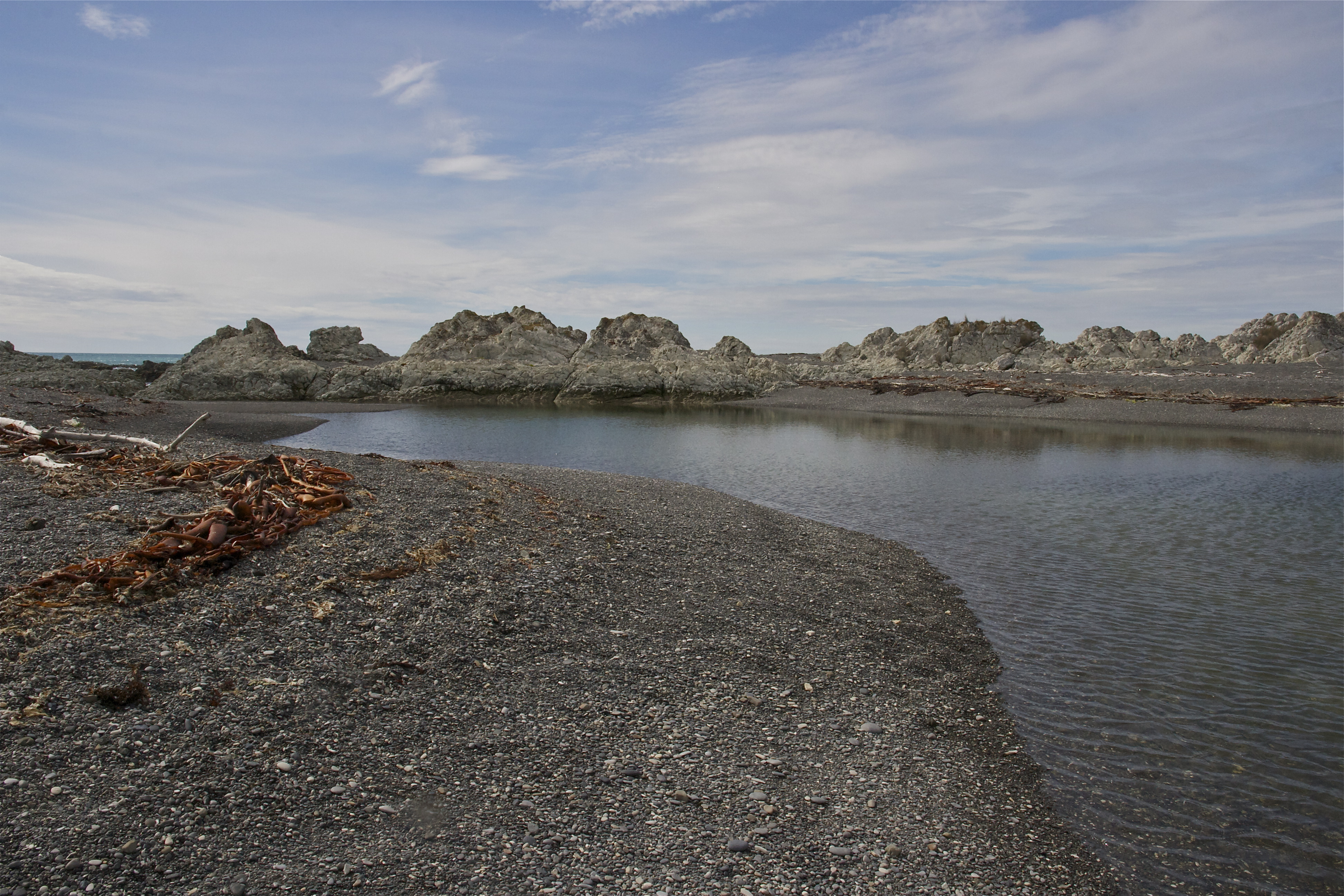
- Ward Beach, where the Flaxbourne River flows into the sea

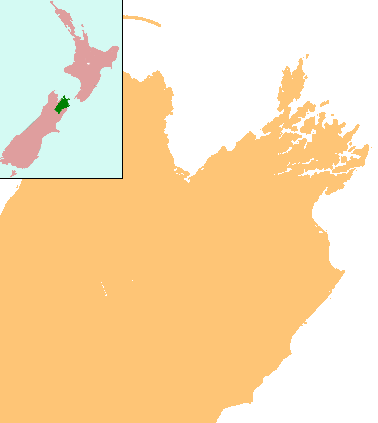
- Location in Marlborough
- Coordinates: 41°50′42″S 174°11′00″E
- Location: Marlborough, New Zealand

Ward Beach is a section of rugged coastline in the Marlborough Region of New Zealand that is known for unusual rock formations. The geological features include the exposed reef platforms that were uplifted by 2 m or more during the 2016 Kaikōura earthquake, and the spherical concretions known as the Ward Beach boulders. Another formation known as the Chancet Rocks is located in a scientific reserve about 1.5 km to the north of the Ward Beach roadend. They contain unusual trace fossils and provide amongst the best on-land evidence of the Cretaceous–Paleogene boundary in marine sediments in the Southern Hemisphere.

Ward Beach has been used as a launching site by a locally based commercial crayfishing company for more than 40 years. However, the uplift of the beach caused by the 2016 earthquake prevented the company from safely launching boats from the previous location. Over a period of several years, the company has sought options that would provide a safe place to launch from the beach. Most of these options have been opposed in environmental consent hearings because of the threat to endangered species. An exclusion zone has been established from just north of the Ward Beach road end to the Chancet Rocks, to protect the area from incursion by vehicles.

== Introduction ==
Ward Beach is located on Marlborough's south east coastline, 4.7 kilometres (2.9 mi) southeast of the town of Ward, and 75 kilometres (47 mi) northwest of Kaikōura. The Flaxbourne River flows into the Pacific Ocean at the southern end of Ward Beach.

This section of the coast from The Needles in the south, to Chancet Rocks in the north, is known for its unusual limestone rock formations. The New Zealand Geopreservation Inventory includes three significant sites in the vicinity of Ward Beach:

- Flaxbourne River: folds and thrusts
- Ward Beach: concretions and wave-cut platforms
- Chancet Rocks: Cretaceous/Tertiary Boundary

There is road access to Ward Beach from the township of Ward. The Marlborough District Council has established a small reserve for day visitors, at the beach roadend.

The access road passes a lime quarry, close to the beach.

== Uplift in 2016 Kaikōura earthquake ==
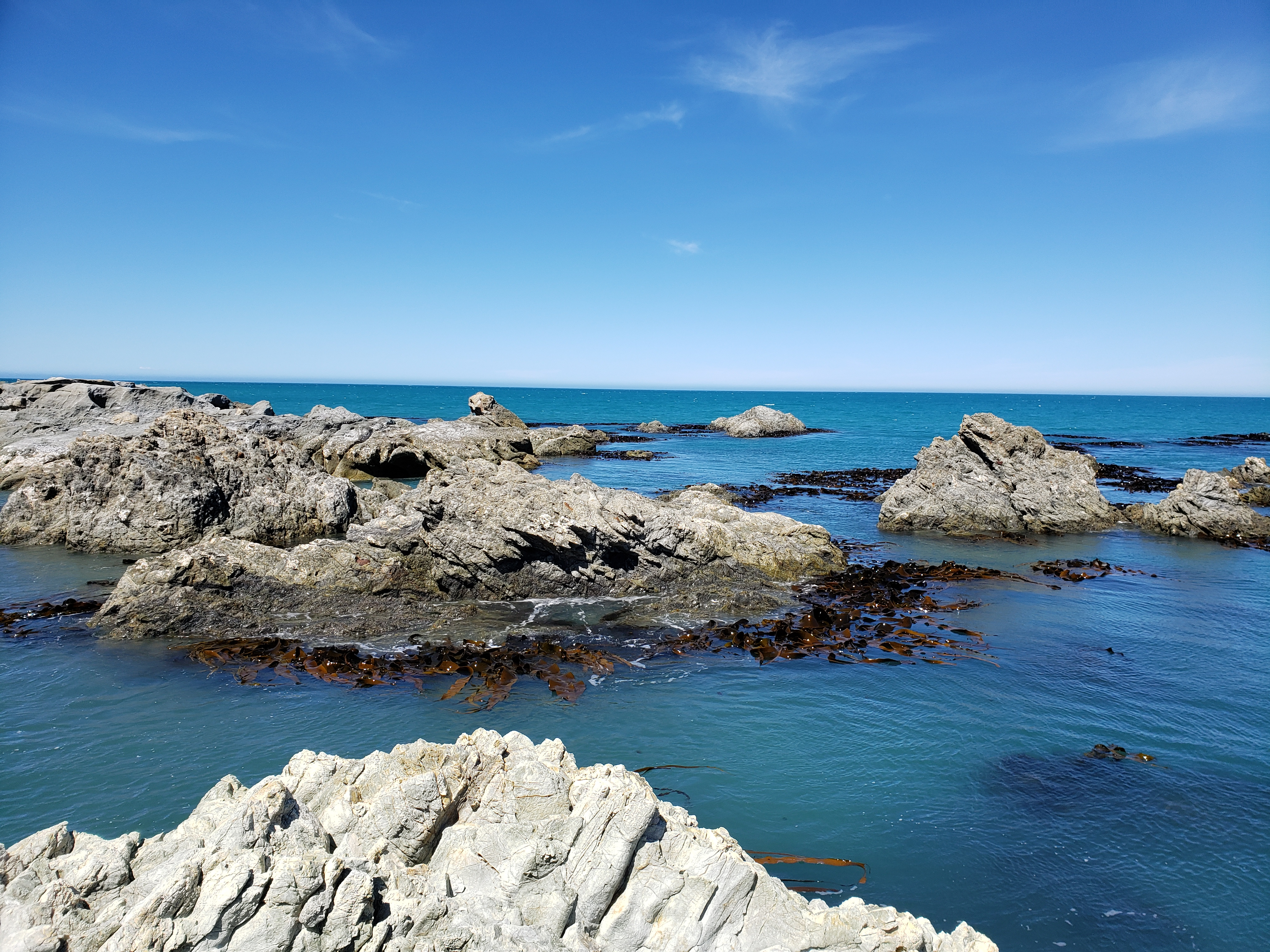
Ward Beach - uplifted shoreline in 2020, with Durvillaea antarctica southern bull kelp

The Kaikoura earthquake of November 2016 created an uplift of around 2.5 to 3 m at Ward Beach and Chancet Rocks.

Immediately following the earthquake, the uplifted rocks and reefs were covered with seaweed, crayfish, paua, sea snails and other marine life that was now exposed above the high tide mark.

The uplift of the beach caused the Flaxbourne River to change course away from its former estuary, cutting through the former bed of the estuary and beach gravels, and exposing more of the limestone rock beneath.

== New surf break ==
The uplift caused by the earthquake changed the depth of water above the seabed offshore, and created a surf break that previously did not exist. The surf breaks to the left or right depending on swell angle, and is described as suitable for intermediate to expert surfers.

== Ward Beach boulders ==
41°50′31″S 174°11′18″E

The large uplift of the seabed caused by the 2016 Kaikōura earthquake revealed spherical concretions on the raised rock platforms at Ward Beach. The concretions are similar to the Moeraki Boulders south of Oamaru.

The boulders are located about 800 m north of the car park at the Ward Beach road end. These concretions were formed in the ocean floor in marine sediments from the late Cretaceous period (>65 million years ago). They were formed over several million years in mudstone that was subsequently buried by overlying sediment. Concretions become harder and more dense than the mudstone that surrounds them, and this means they can remain even after the material surrounding them has been removed by erosion. The Ward Beach boulders are formed from dolomite – calcium magnesium carbonate.

Ward Beach Boulders

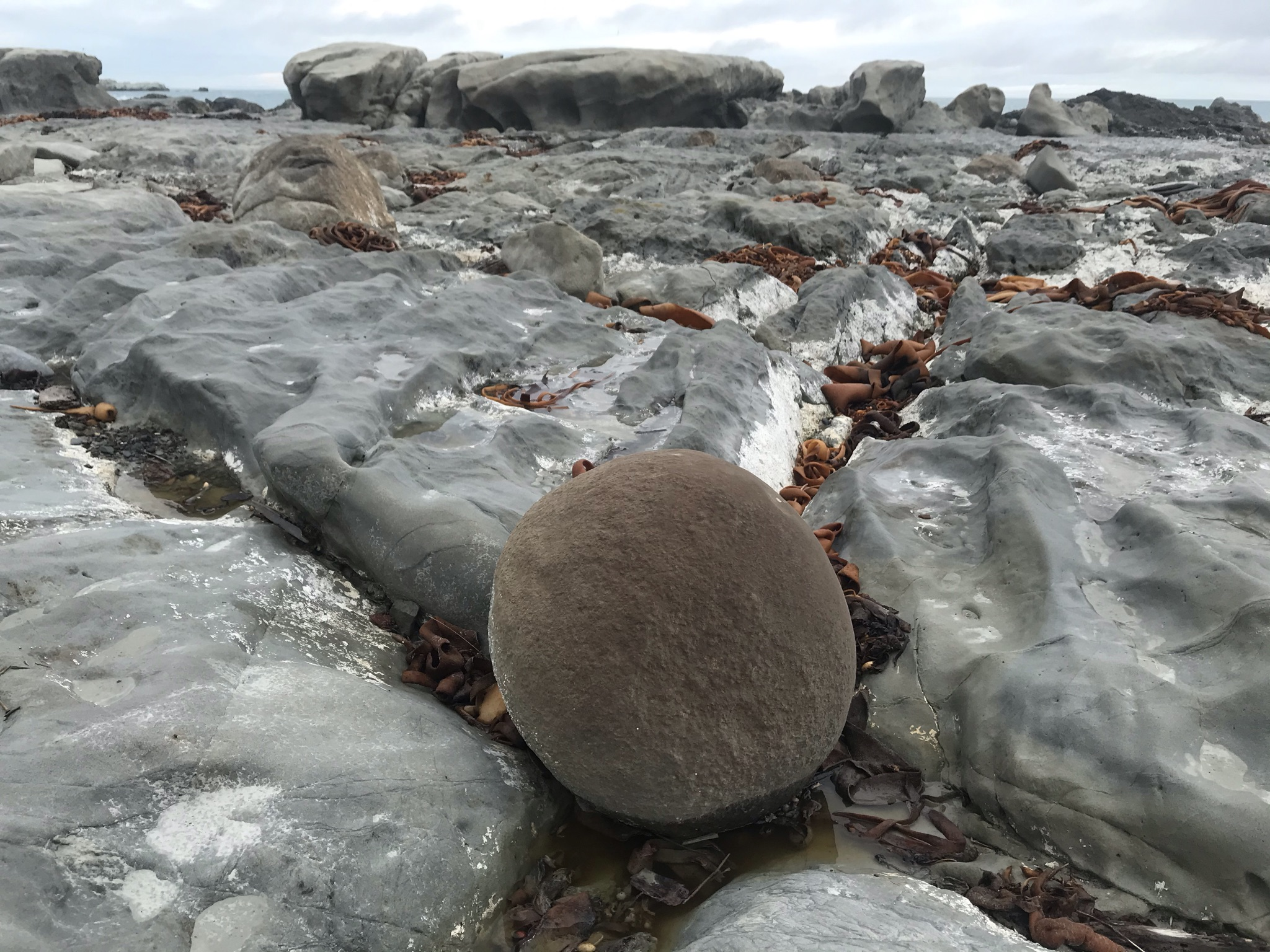

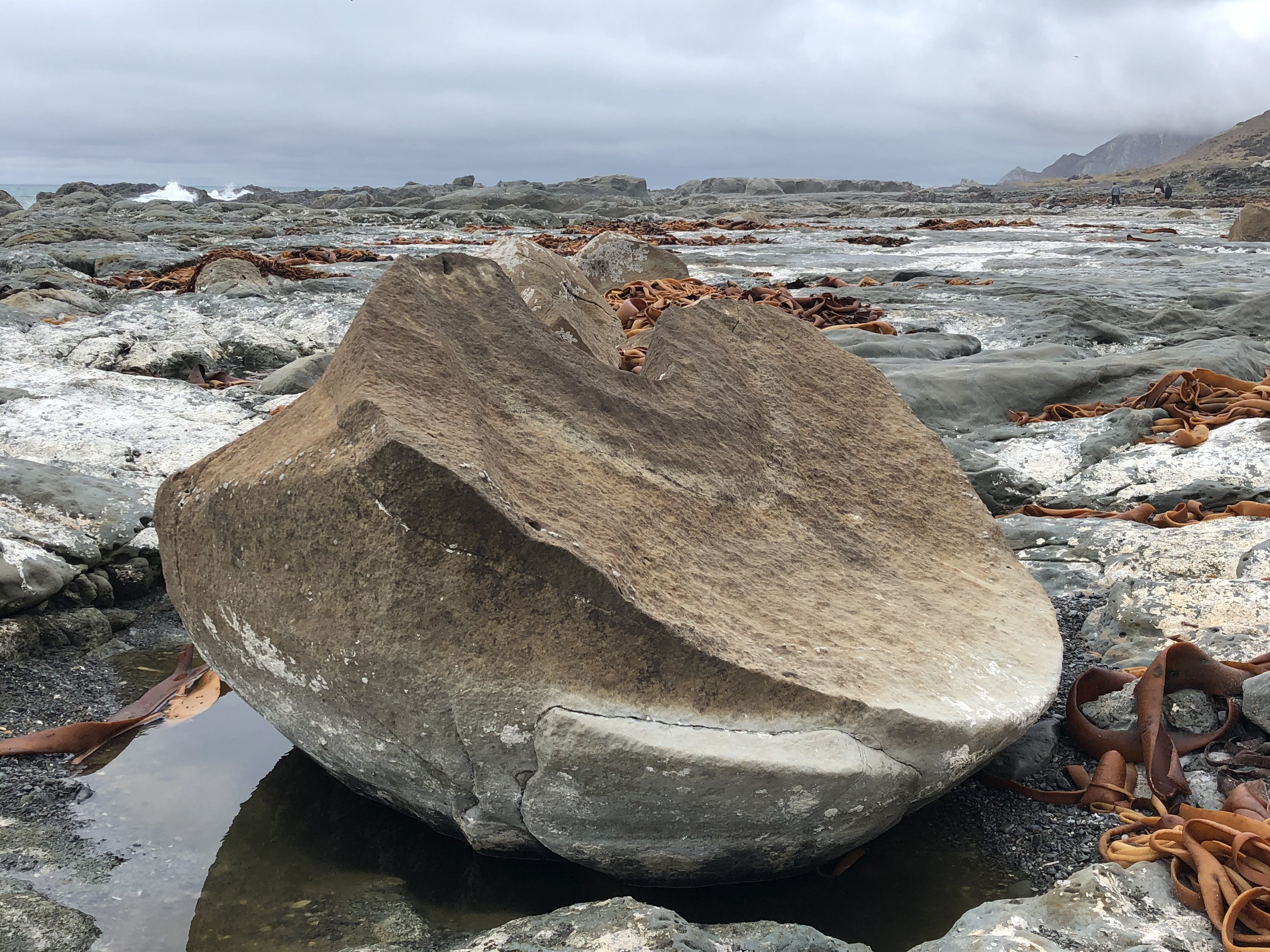

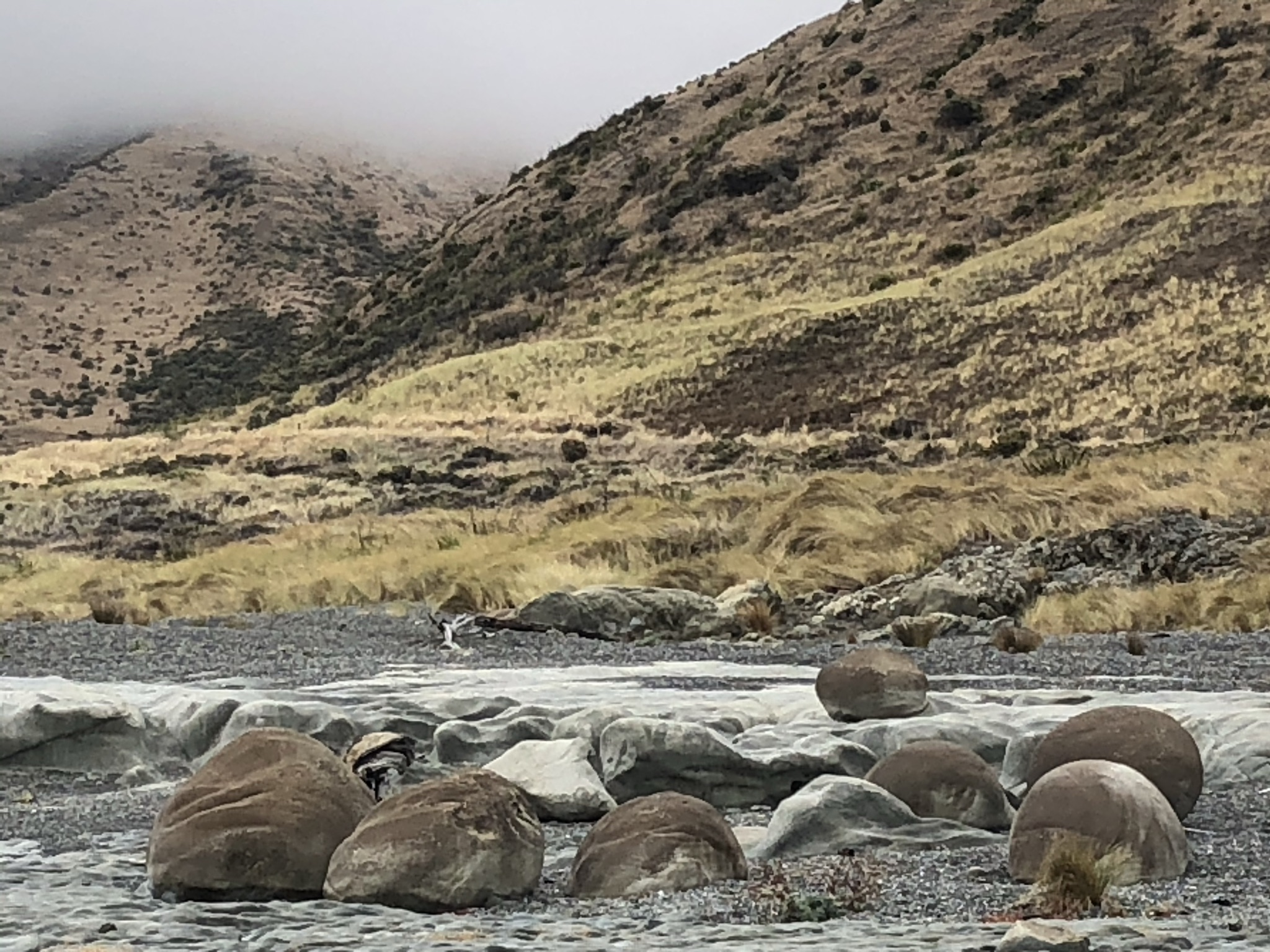

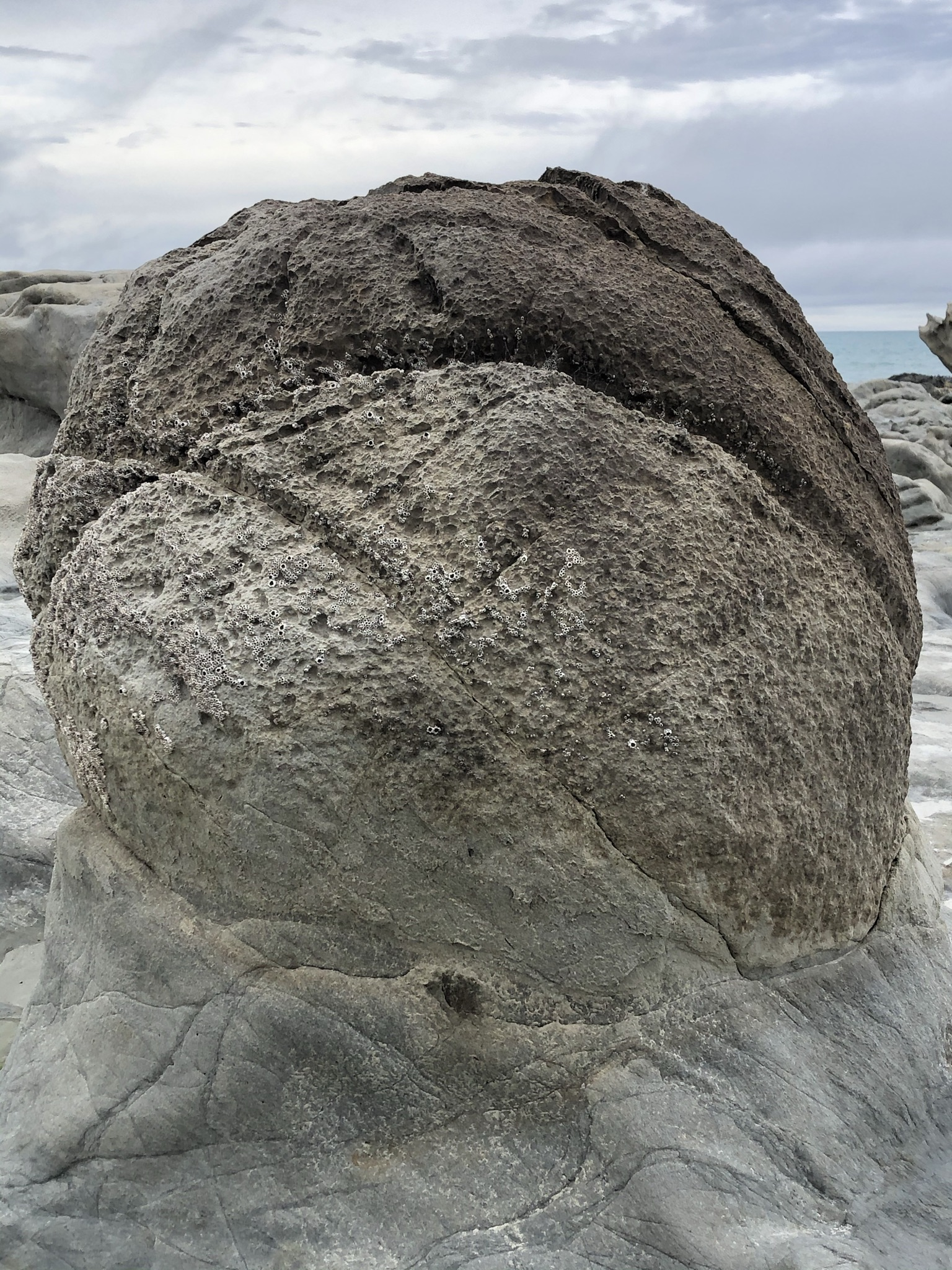

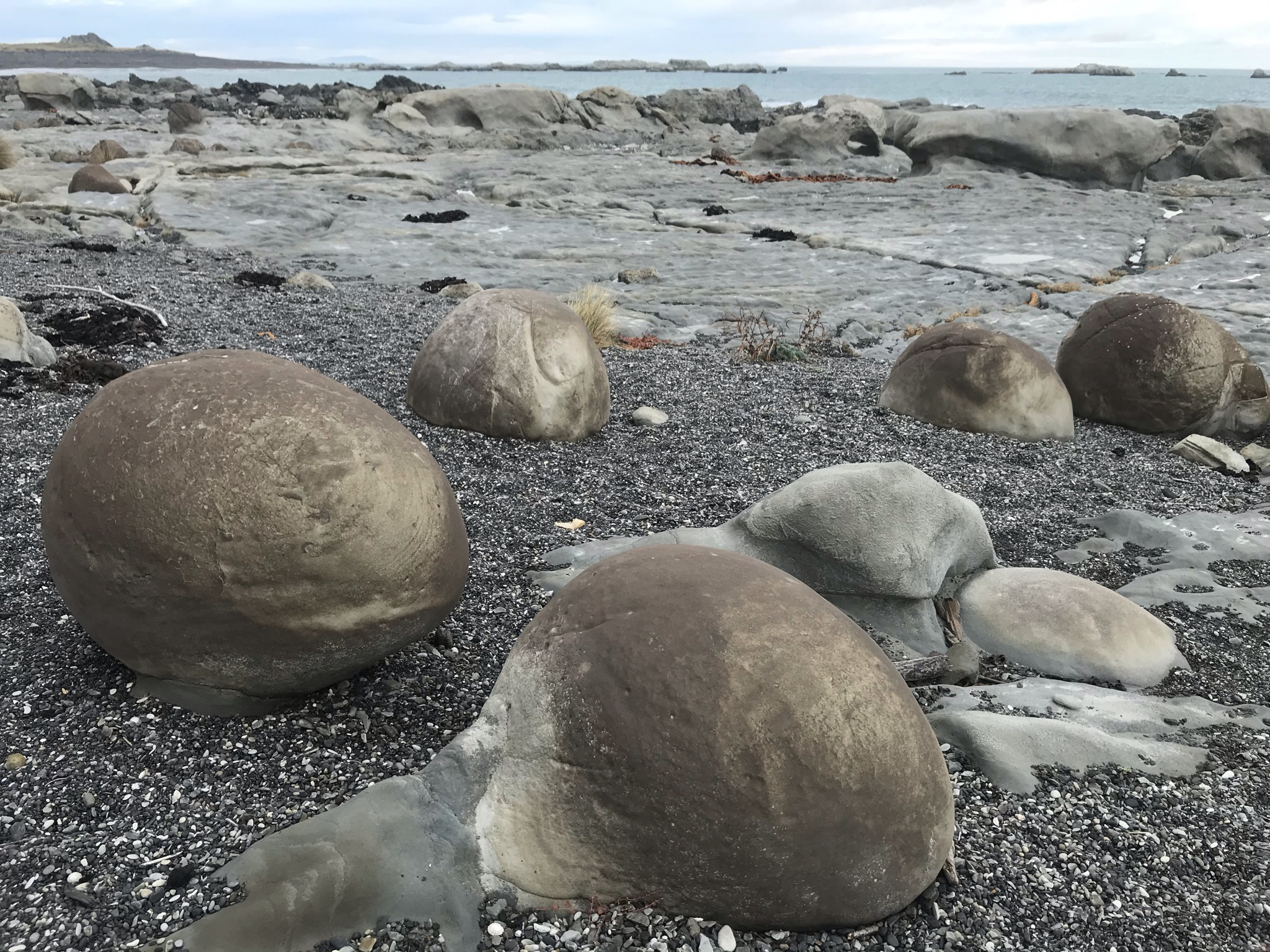

== Chancet Rocks ==
41°50′07″S 174°11′47″E

=== Formation ===
The Chancet Rocks are a limestone rock formation located about 1.5 km north of the end of Ward Beach road. The area is designated as a scientific reserve. The outcrop is formed from a fine-grained white limestone known as the Amuri limestone. It originated as calcareous sediments deposited in the ocean on the continental shelf around 65 to 25 million years ago. The layers of limestone rock were originally laid down on the sea floor, but have been tilted upwards into an almost vertical position by deformation of the Earth's crust. Amongst the unusual features in this rock outcrop are large trace fossils, formed by animals that are currently unknown.

=== Cretaceous-Paleogene boundary layer ===
The Chancet Rocks provide evidence of the Cretaceous–Paleogene boundary (K-Pg boundary) that has been found worldwide, and coincides with a mass extinction, including the end of the age of the dinosaurs. The most likely explanation is that this global event was caused by the impact of a large asteroid striking the earth where Mexico's Yucatán Peninsula is today. The presence of the K-Pg boundary layer in the Chancet Rocks has been confirmed by the presence of high concentrations of iridium. The boundary layer typically lies between light pink, Late Cretaceous limestone and light green Paleogene limestone. The boundary layer itself is marked by around 20 cm of dark grey limestone, with around 2 cm of dark grey, soft clay at the boundary.

The Chancet Rocks are amongst the best on-land evidence of the K-Pg boundary in marine sediments in the Southern Hemisphere.

=== Legal protection and classification ===
Chancet Rocks is a legally protected area of Crown property, and is designated as a scientific reserve under s21 of the Reserves Act 1977. The boundaries of the reserve are identified in the LINZ data service.

In a submission to the Environment Committee of Marlborough District Council by NZ Royal Forest and Bird Protection Society dated 15 March 2017, the reserve was characterised as "internationally significant Chancet Rocks scientific reserve and geopreservation site. The site is ranked A: internationally important with a vulnerability index of 1: vulnerable to complete destruction by human activity".

Chancet Rocks, and the area known as The Needles to the south of Ward Beach, are both classified as Outstanding Natural Character Areas in Volume 3, Appendix 2 of the proposed Marlborough Environment Plan. The citation includes: "The limestone features and wave cut platforms of the Needles and Chancet Rocks are unique to this coastline and have been identified as individual geopreservation sites due to their unique geological makeup".

Chancet Rocks

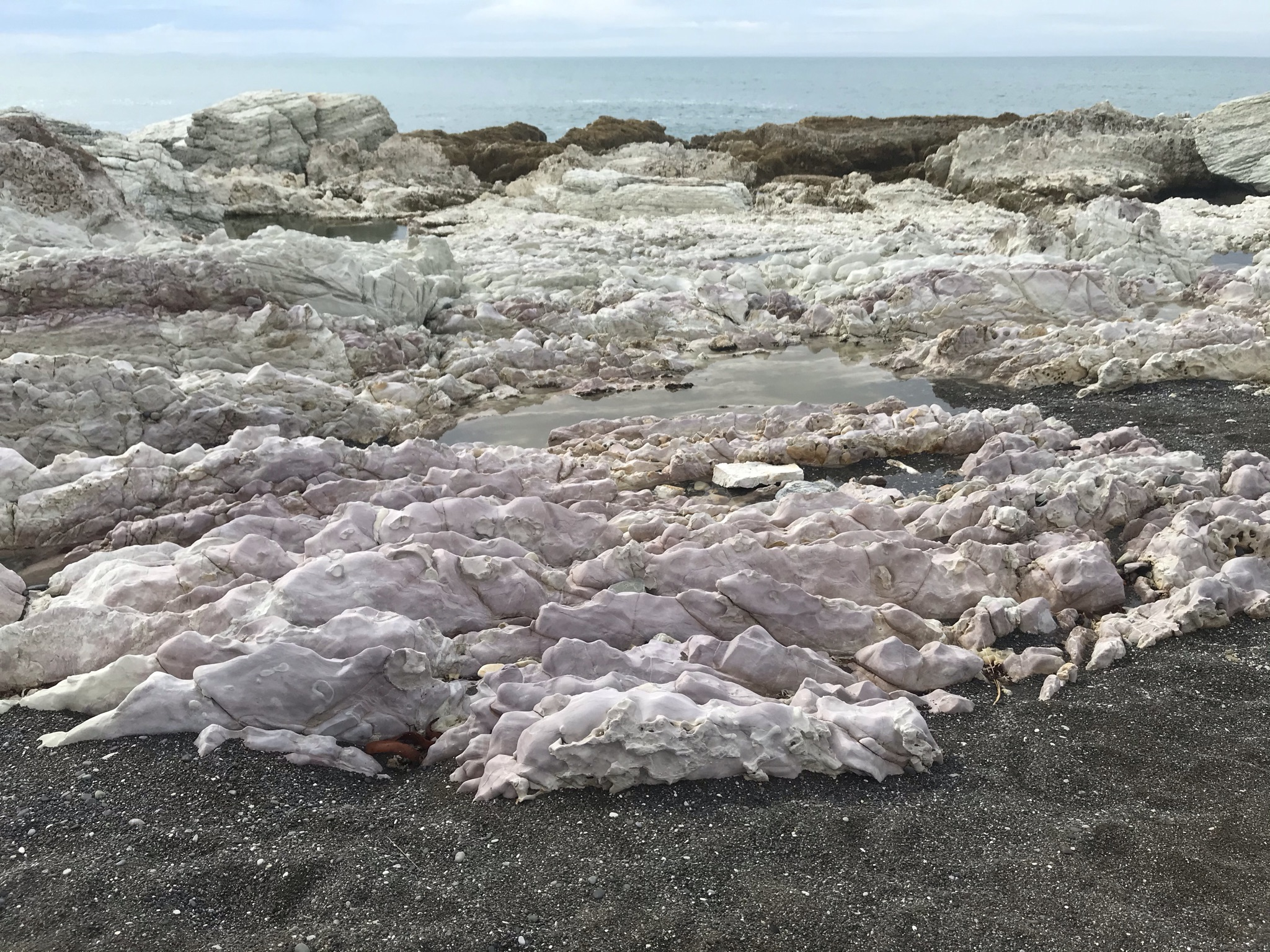

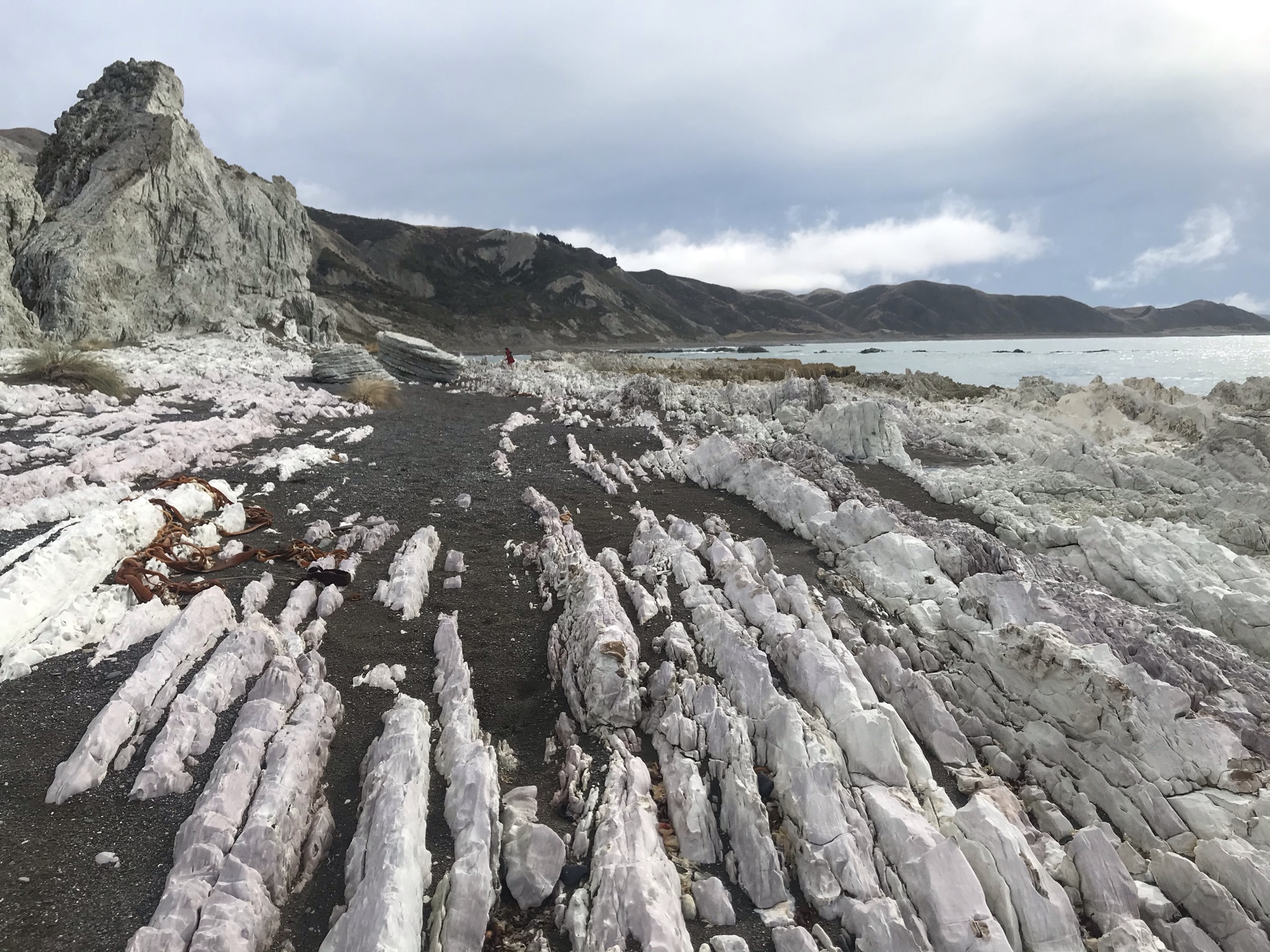

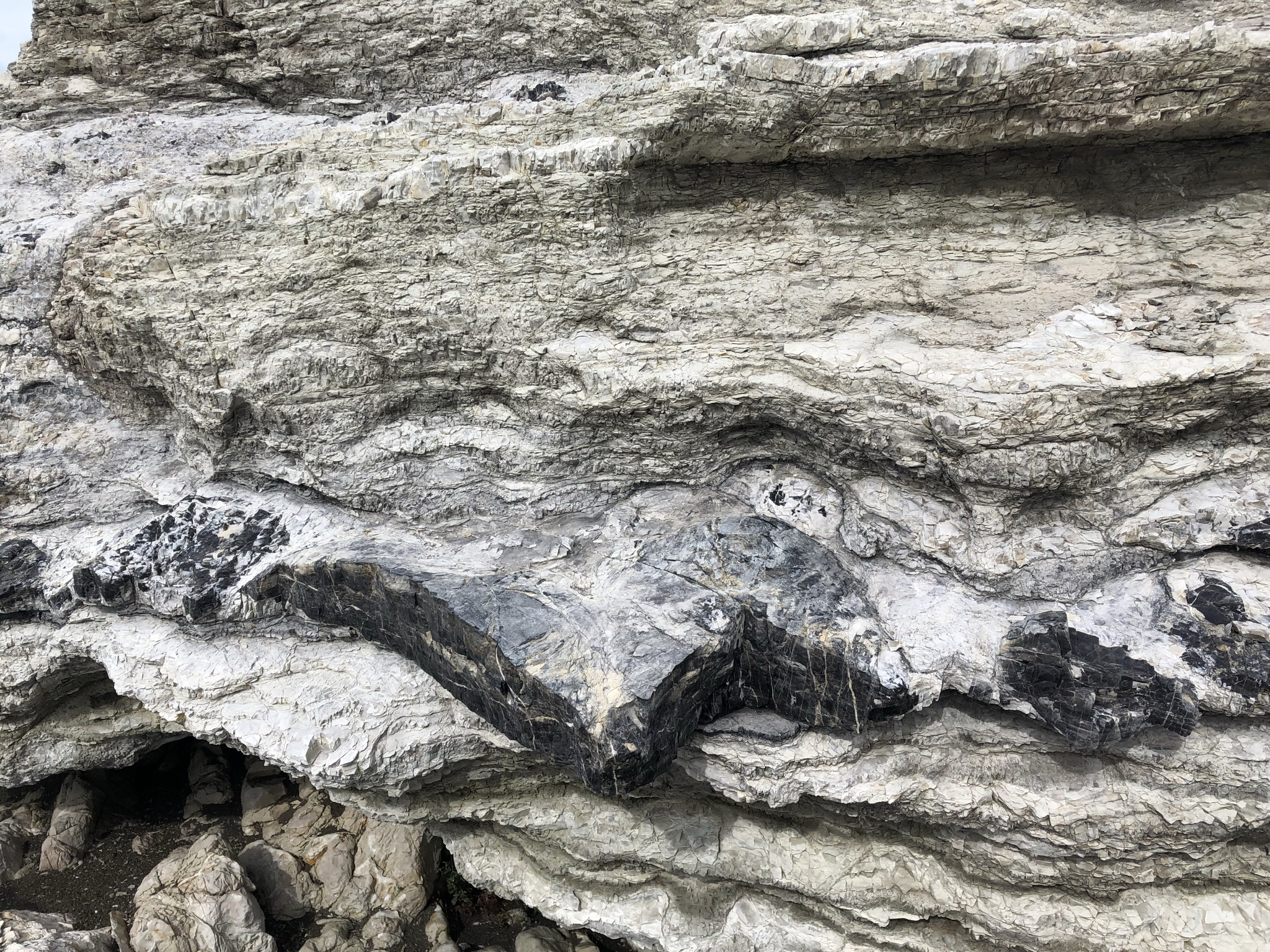

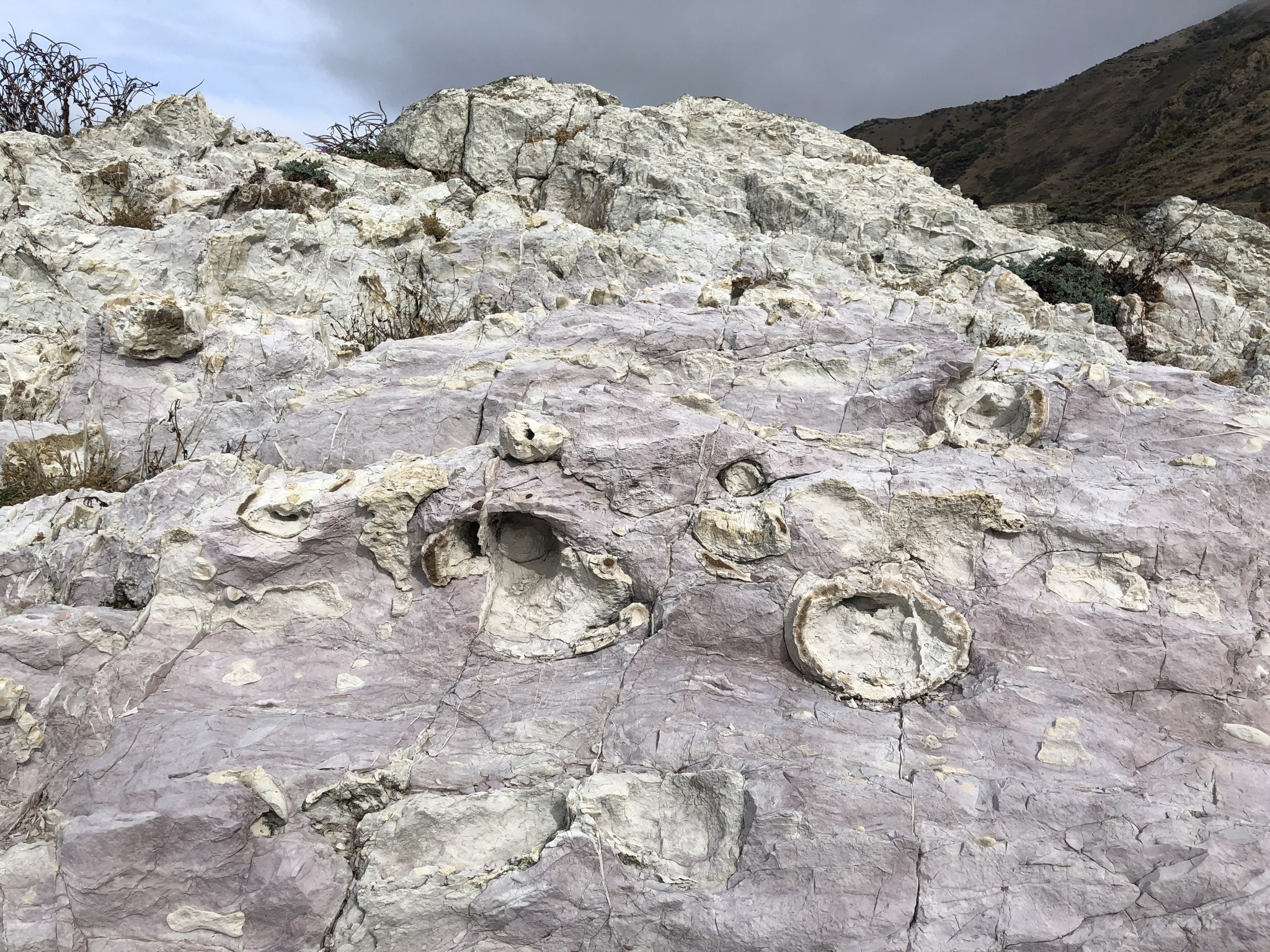

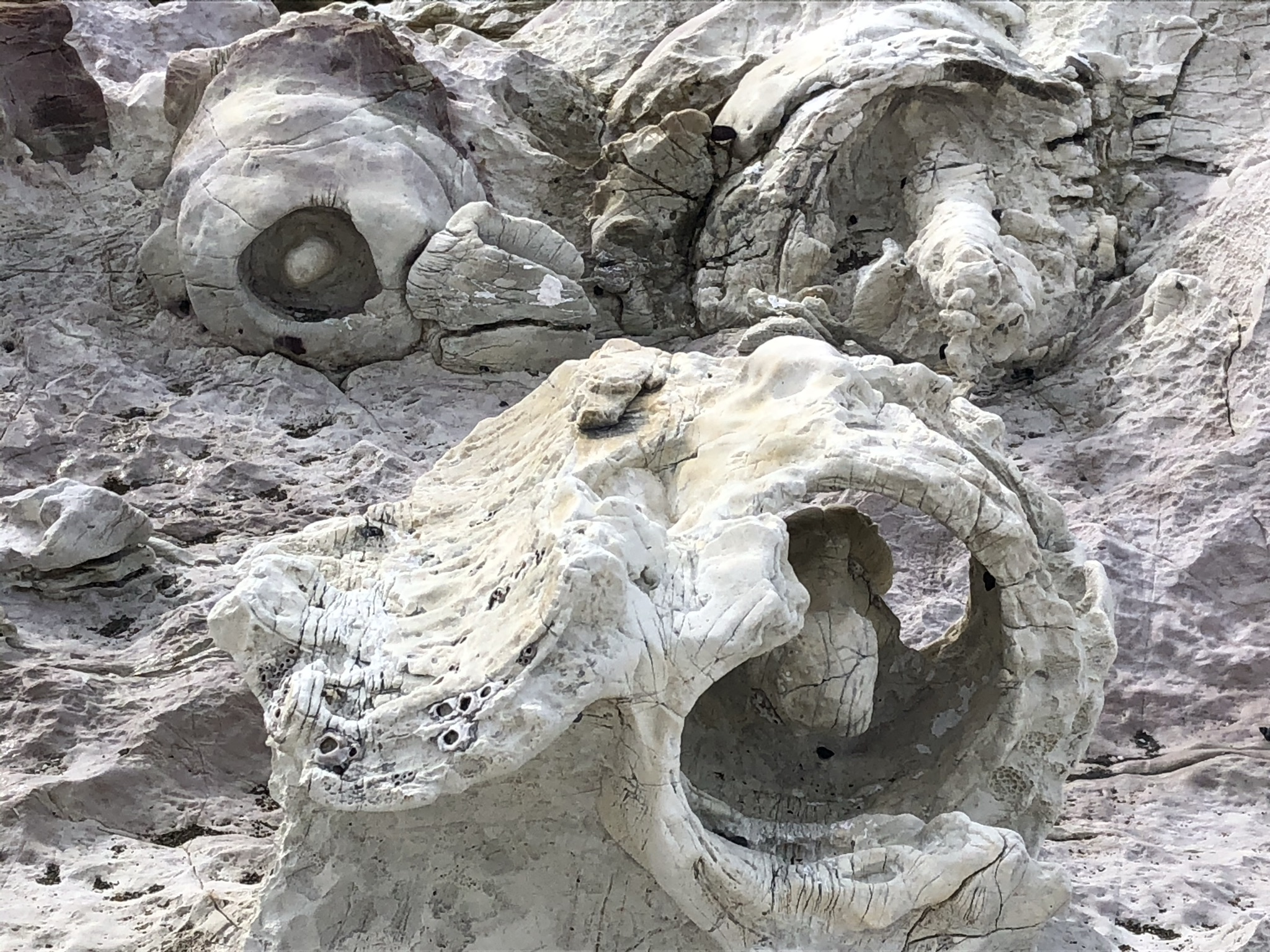

== Bio-diversity ==
The Marlborough Environment Plan identifies the Ward Beach coastline as an area of outstanding natural landscape, and it is mapped as a threatened environment. The animals and birds identified in this area of the coast include New Zealand fur seal, banded dotterel, ruddy turnstone, Caspian tern, black-fronted tern, white-fronted tern, South Island oystercatcher, variable oystercatcher and pied stilt. Plants identified in the dunes in the area include:

- Morning glory, Calystegia soldanella
- Marlborough rock daisy, Pachystegia insignis
- New Zealand daphne, Pimelea prostrata
- Coastal tree daisy, Olearia solandri
- Tauhinu or cottonwood, Ozothamnus leptophyllus

== Access by fishing company ==
A local fishing company, Burkhart Fisheries, had launched fishing boats from Ward Beach for 42 years before the 2016 Kaikōura earthquake. However, one of the consequences of the large uplift of the seabed at Ward Beach in the earthquake is that it became difficult to launch their boat from the usual place on the beach. The fishing company applied to Marlborough District Council for a resource consent to launch their boat from a point further north on the beach, close to a scientific reserve at Chancet Rocks. The proposal included forming an existing paper road north from Ward Beach to Chancet Rocks, creating a parking area, and to undertake boat launching operations adjacent to Chancet Rocks. Opponents claimed that the proposal would risk disturbing animal and plant life, including a colony of New Zealand fur seals. Another issue of concern was that other parties would use the new road and this would lead to increased risk of damage to the scientific reserve. Following consent hearings in July 2017, the application was refused.

The Royal Forest and Bird Protection Society subsequently complained to the Marlborough District Council that the company had used bulldozers to drag its boats further up the beach to a new launch site. The Environment Court issued urgent cease and desist orders in December 2017. The orders include an exclusion zone south of Chancet Rocks, to protect threatened bird species such as banded dotterels and variable oystercatchers that nest on the beach. The interim enforcement orders were made permanent in June 2019.

In May 2018, the fishing company received a non-notified consent to construct a gravel causeway as a temporary launch site, outside of the exclusion zone.

On 24 January 2020, Burkhart Fisheries applied for a consent to shift gravel and restore a temporary causeway at a site on the beach 50 m south of the exclusion zone. There was opposition from conservationists and iwi, and the application eventually proceeded to a hearing. In early 2021, Burkhart Fisheries was granted a consent to move gravel and form the temporary launch site, for a 5-year term. However, Burkhart Fisheries found that sea conditions were pushing gravel into the launch site too quickly, and the terms of the newly approved resource consent limited the ways they could respond.
