= Foster baronets =

Set index for Foster baronets

There have been three baronetcies created for persons with the surname Foster, all in the Baronetage of the United Kingdom. Two of the creations are extinct.

- Foster baronets of Glyde Court (1831)
- Foster baronets of Norwich (1838)
- Foster baronets, of Bloomsbury (1930)
