= Flaxbourne River =

Coordinates: 41°51′S 174°11′E

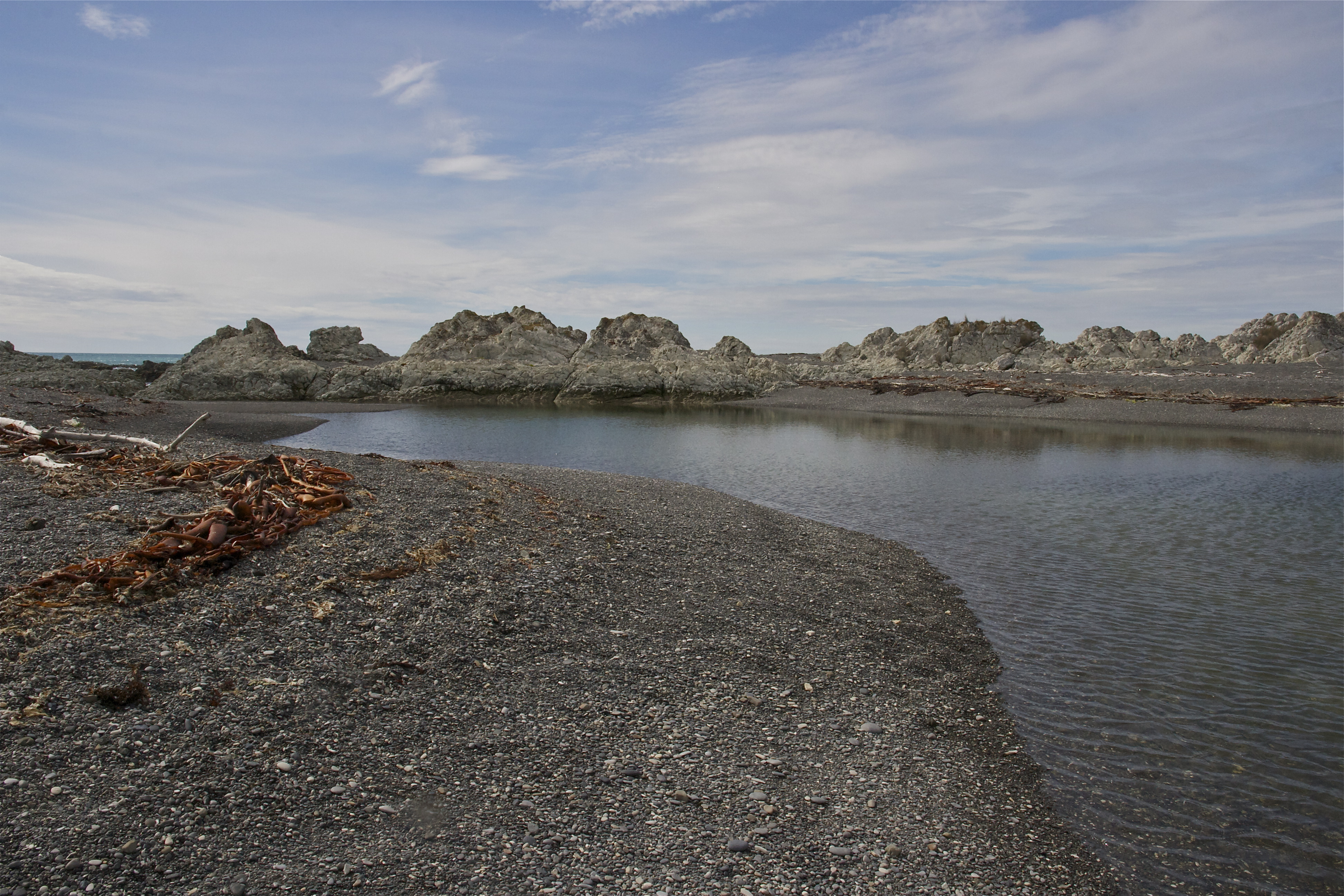
- Ward Beach, where the Flaxbourne River flows into the sea

Location
- Country: New Zealand

Physical characteristics
- Source
  - location: Inland Kaikoura Range
- Mouth
  - location: Pacific Ocean

The Flaxbourne River is a river in the Marlborough region of New Zealand. It arises in the Inland Kaikoura Range and Halden Hills and flows east and then south-east into the South Pacific Ocean near Ward. It is named after the Flaxbourne sheep station established by Sir Charles Clifford in 1847. The river is narrow and choked with willows.

The river provides water for irrigation, and for stock and domestic supply. During summer the demand for water normally exceeds the availability. While the river is never dry, some of its tributaries dry up during most summers. As of 2017, there is an initiative to have Ward renamed as Flaxbourne.

== See also ==
- List of rivers of New Zealand
