= Busby Hall =

Country house in North Yorkshire, England

Coordinates: 54.4297°N 1.2070°W

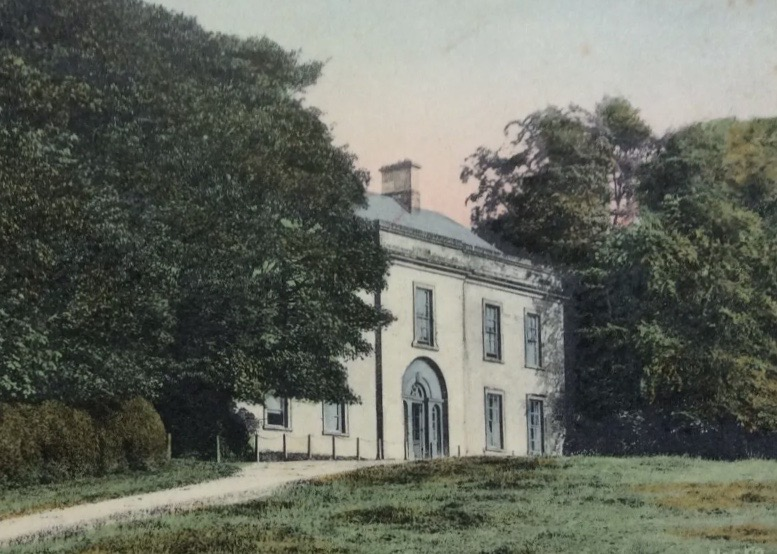
- Busby Hall c. 1900
- Interactive map of the Busby Hall area

General information
- Type: Country House
- Architectural style: Neoclassicism
- Location: Little Busby, North Yorkshire
- Completed: 1764 (current building)
- Owner: The Marwood Family

Design and construction
- Architect: Robert Corney

Busby Hall is a Grade II* listed Country House in Little Busby, North Yorkshire, England, close to the village of Carlton-in-Cleveland. The house and parkland sits within the North York Moors National Park.

The house is perhaps best known as the inspiration for Groby Hall in Parade's End, a novel by Ford Madox Ford.

== History ==
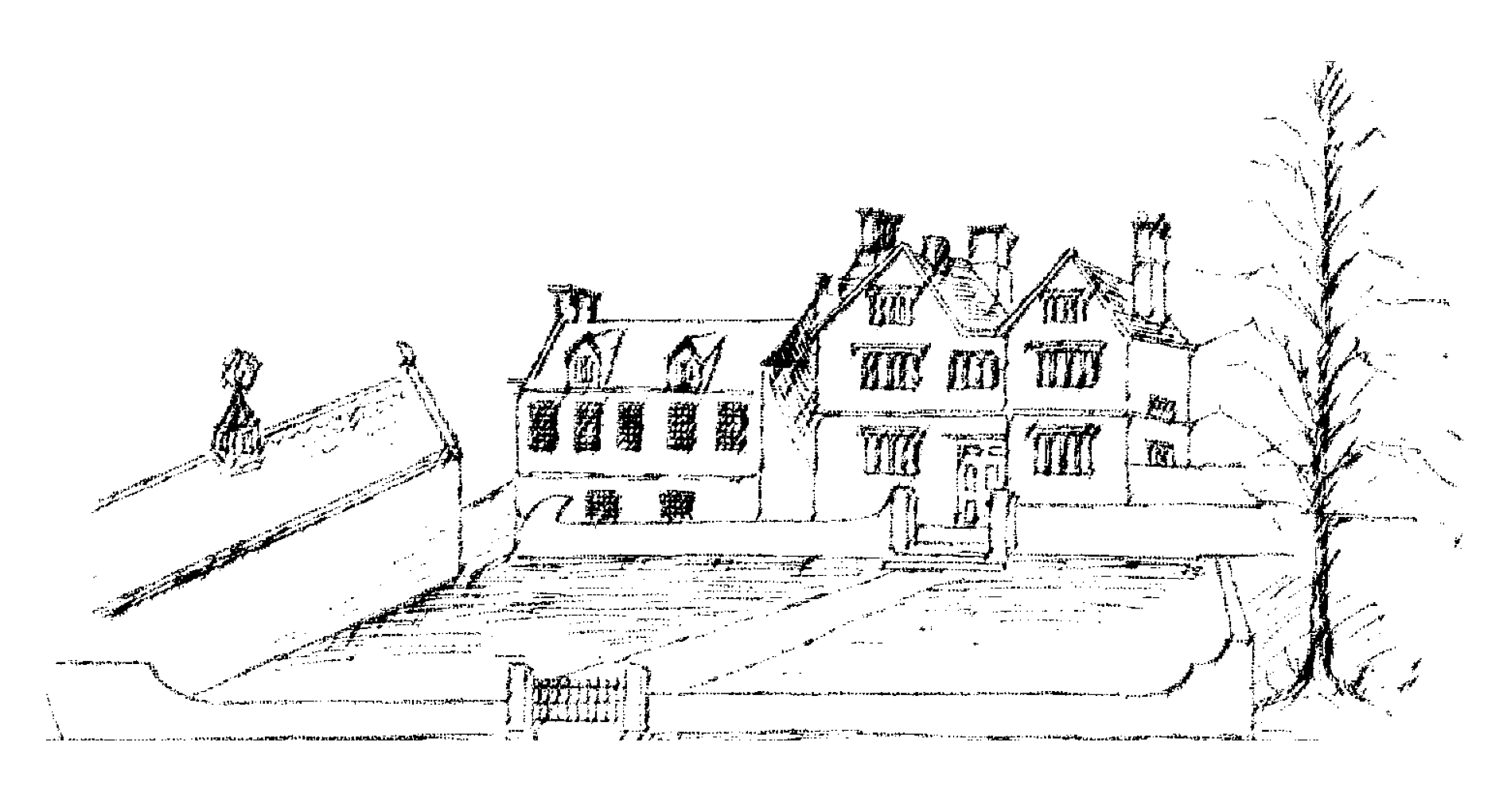
Busby Hall in the 1600s

Busby Hall has been in the possession of the Marwood family since 1587. The current building was constructed in 1764 after a devastating fire destroyed a much earlier building. It is known that plans for a grander building were prepared by the preeminent neo-classical architect John Carr of York but were later abandoned. The constructed design was by Robert Corney. It has been remarked that the design of the house appears to be earlier in style than was typical for the time, but the reason for this or why the plans of a more fashionable architect were not used is not clear. The house sits in the centre of a 700-acre parkland with a number of other listed buildings. These include the Grade II stable block located to the north and a Grade II* walled garden to the south east of the Hall.

There are several acres of gardens which surround the hall, which once contained a chestnut tree reputed to be the largest in England.

== The Marwoods of Busby Hall ==
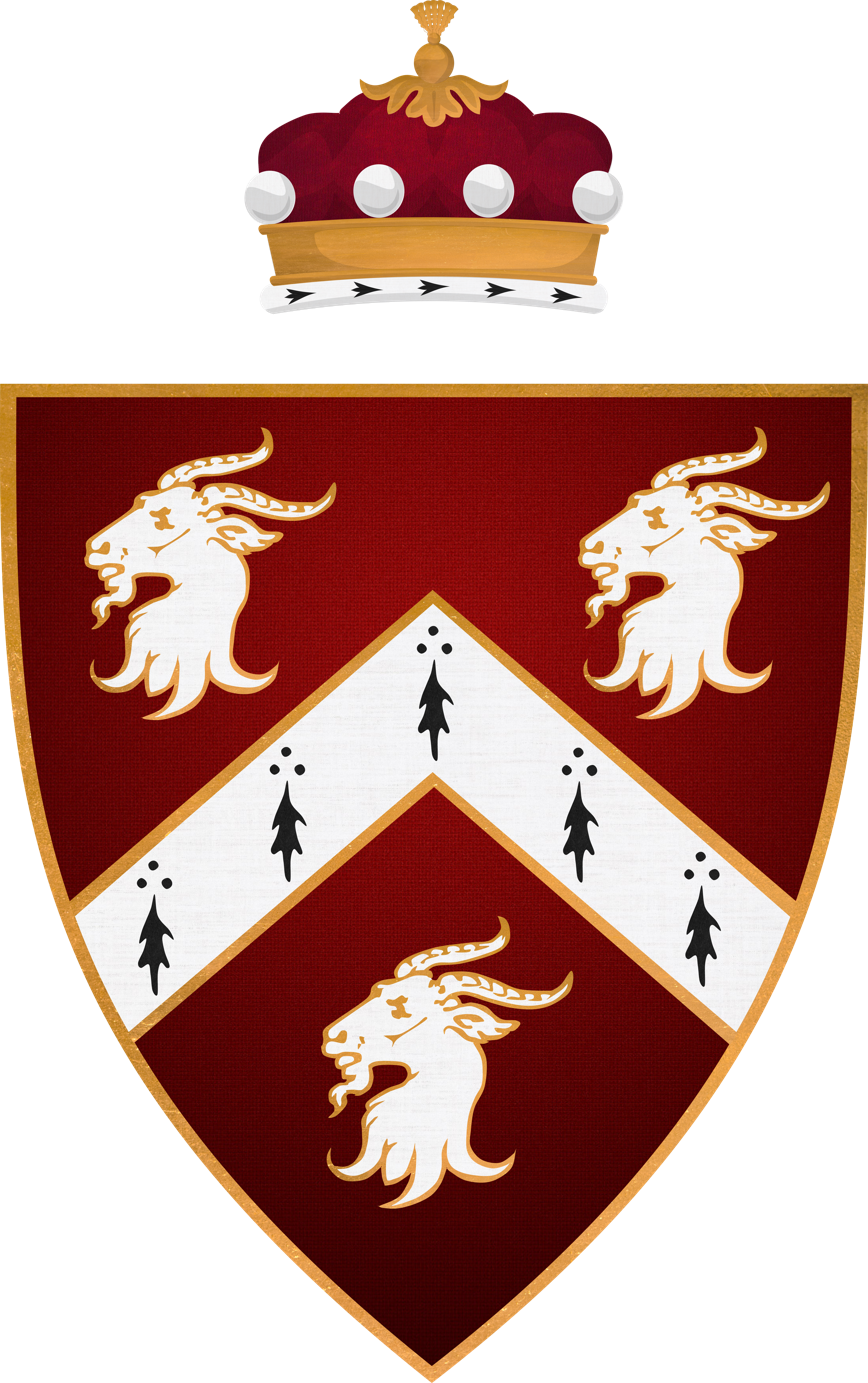
Marwood Coat of Arms

The Marwoods had held lands in this part of North Yorkshire for a number of years by the time Busby Hall became their principle seat in the 16th Century. They were granted the hereditary title of Baronet of Little Busby in 1660. The Marwood family descended from Edward III of England and are related, through marriage, to many prominent aristocratic families including the Lascelles, Wentworths, Van Straubenzees and the Earls of Holderness. Notable family members included Sir George Marwood and Sir Henry Marwood who both respectively served as High Sheriffs of Yorkshire and members of parliament for Northallerton. Arthur Pierson Marwood, a friend of Ford Madox Ford, is likely to be the inspiration for Christopher Tietjens in the novel Parade's End.

== Inspiration for Groby Hall in Parade's End ==
Considered one of the great literary works of the 20th century, Parade's End details the story of an ancient landed family from Yorkshire. It is purported that Madox Ford based the novel on both his then friend Arthur, a scion of the Marwood family, and their home Busby Hall. Sir William Marwood, Arthur's elder brother is similarly considered the inspiration for Mark Tietjens. There is are several piece of evidence for this. First, it is noted that the parities between Arthur Marwood and Christopher Tietjens are highly apparent, Marwood and Tietjens both being talented economists and regarded for their stoic and 'honourable' characteristics. It is also evident that Busby Hall shares many similarities with Tietjen's Groby Hall, including the location. In the novel, several references are made to 'Groby Great Tree' which is thought to be inspired by the famed chestnut tree. It is also case that Busby was let for a period of time as also occurs at the end of the novel when the Groby Great Tree is symbolically felled by the brash new tenant. The similarities of the locations, characters and events of the book proved sensitive for Marwood who permanently broke off contact with Madox Ford.

== See also ==
- Grade II* listed buildings in North Yorkshire (district)
- Listed buildings in Little Busby
