= Foster baronets, of Bloomsbury (1930) =

The Foster baronetcy, of Bloomsbury in the County of London, was created in the Baronetage of the United Kingdom on 5 February 1930 for the university administrator and educationalist Gregory Foster. He was provost of University College London between 1907 and 1929 and vice-chancellor of the University of London between 1928 and 1930.

== Foster baronets, of Bloomsbury (1930) ==
- Sir (Thomas) Gregory Foster, 1st Baronet (1866–1931)
- Sir Thomas Saxby Gregory Foster, 2nd Baronet (1899–1957)
- Sir John Gregory Foster, 3rd Baronet (1927–2006)
- Sir Saxby Gregory Foster, 4th Baronet (born 1957).

The heir apparent to the baronetcy is Thomas James Gregory Foster (born 1991), son of the 4th Baronet.
