= Aroha Clifford =

New Zealand aviator (1908–1933)

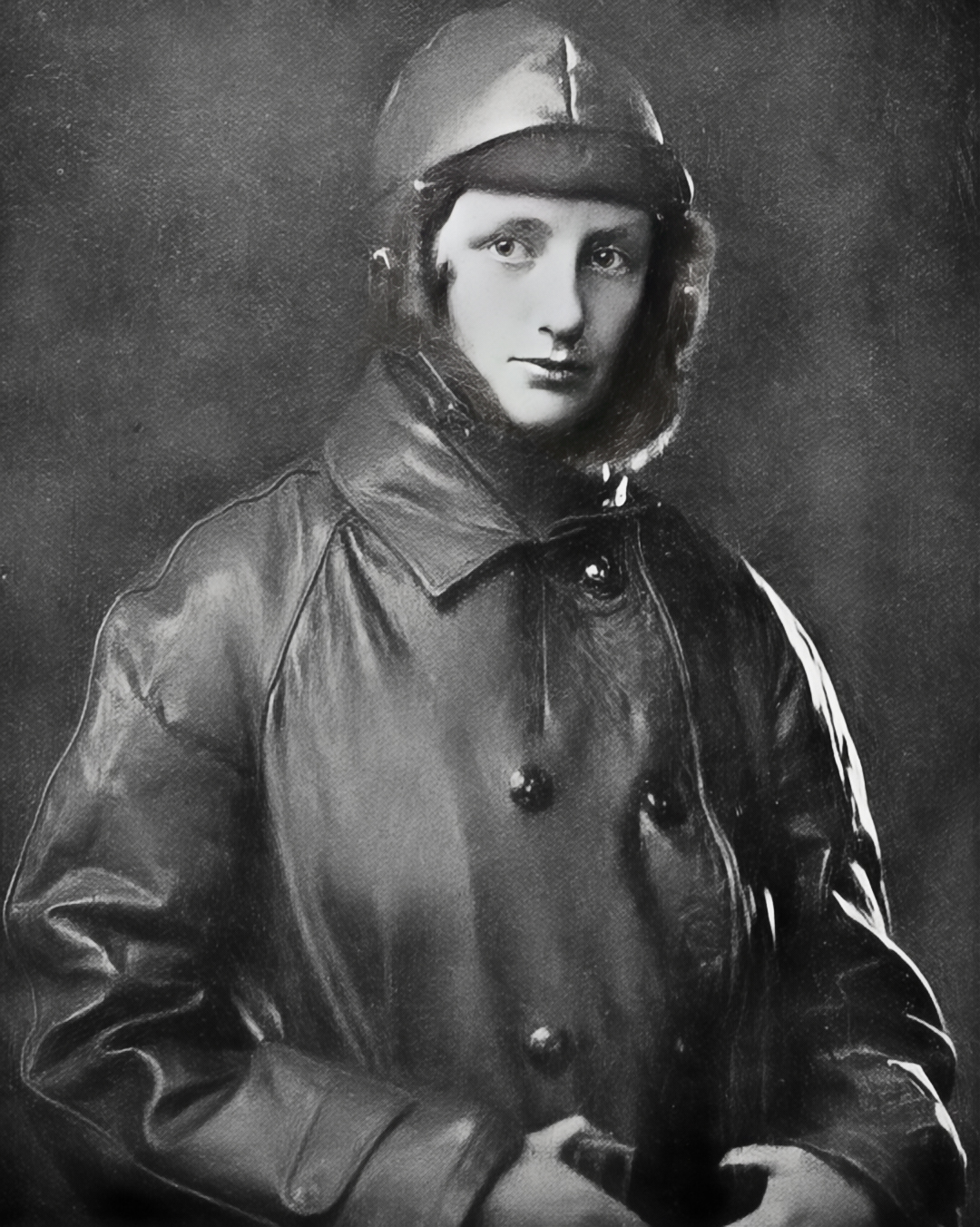
- Born: Mary Lucy Aroha Clifford; 23 August 1908; Wellington, New Zealand
- Died: 30 November 1933 (aged 25); Rotherham, New Zealand
- Spouse: Alf Brustad (m. 1931)
- Relatives: Charles Clifford (grandfather)

Mary Lucy Aroha Brustad (née Clifford; 23 August 1908 – 30 November 1933) was a New Zealand pilot. She was the first woman in New Zealand to gain a pilot's licence from an aero club. On 8 May 1930, Clifford became the first woman pilot to fly across Cook Strait.

== Biography ==
Clifford was born in Wellington on 23 August 1908. Her parents were Walter Lovelace Clifford, who succeeded to the Clifford baronetcy in 1938, and Catherine Clifford (née Bath). She spent part of her childhood in England, where she attended Ascot Convent. The family returned to New Zealand and settled in Fendalton, Christchurch, and Clifford continued her education at St Mary's Convent. As a teenager, she was a keen mountaineer and skier, and frequently hiked in the Aoraki / Mount Cook region.

Clifford trained as a pilot at the Canterbury Aero Club, where she was the first pupil the newly formed club accepted. She completed her pilot training in 1928.

In February 1930 she participated in the Blenheim Air Pageant at Woodbourne Aerodrome. She won the Jackson Cup in the pilots' landing competition, and also won the Zero Hour competition. On 8 May 1930, Clifford became the first woman to pilot an aeroplane across Cook Strait. During the same year, she also participated in the Hawke's Bay and East Coast Aero Club Pageant at Hastings, the Hawera Coast Aero Club Pageant, the Auckland Aero Club Pageant and the Canterbury Aero Club Pageant at Wigram. Later in 1930, Clifford travelled to England to undertake further flying courses. She joined the London Aero Club and flew from the Stag Lane Aerodrome, and also completed a three-month course in mechanics at the De Havilland factory, becoming a qualified ground engineer.

Clifford returned to New Zealand in 1931, bringing back her own aeroplane, a de Havilland Puss Moth, which she had purchased in England. On 23 September 1931 at her parents' home in Fendalton, Clifford married Alf Brustad, a Norwegian guide at the Hermitage Hotel, Mount Cook Village, who had been her guide on several mountaineering expeditions in the area. The couple lived in Christchurch until early 1933, when they purchased a farm in Waiau and moved there.

Clifford died in Amuri Hospital in Rotherham on 30 November 1933 of pneumonia, two days after giving birth to a son. She was 25 years old.
