= Gregory Foster =

British academic (1866–1931)

Sir Thomas Gregory Foster (10 June 1866 – 24 September 1931) was the Provost of University College London from 1904 to 1929, and Vice-Chancellor of the University of London from 1928 to 1930.

== Early life ==
Foster was born in London and attended University College School and graduated from University College London (UCL) in 1888 with a degree in English. He obtained a PhD from Strasbourg University in 1892 with his dissertation on the Anglo-Saxon poem Judith (Judith: studies in metre, language and style, with a view to determining the date of the Oldenglish fragment and the home of its author).

== Career ==
Foster first taught at UCL became a professor of English language and literature at Bedford College, London before returning to UCL where he spent 25 years in administration as secretary, principal and later provost. As Vice-Chancellor of the University of London, Foster was instrumental in having the new university building established in central London at Bloomsbury rather than Holland Park in west London.

== Legacy ==
The Foster Court area of UCL's Bloomsbury campus is named after Foster.

== Personal life ==
Foster was knighted in 1917 and created a baronet in 1930. In 1894 he married Fanny Maude (d.1928) and they had two sons and two daughters. He died in Hove, Sussex, in 1931.

== Collections ==
University College London holds the following collections relating to Foster:

- Foster's archive which contains correspondence, lecture notes, and draft manuscripts;
- Letters to Foster concerning the membership of the UCL Council.

== See also ==
- List of Vice-Chancellors of the University of London
- List of British university chancellors and vice-chancellors

Academic offices
New post	Provost of the University College London; 1904–1929	Succeeded by Allen Mawer
Preceded by The Lord Beveridge PC KCB	Vice-Chancellor of the University of London; 1928-1930	Succeeded by Rev J. Scott Lidgett CH
Baronetage of the United Kingdom
New creation	Baronet (of Bloomsbury); 1930–1931	Succeeded by Thomas Saxby Gregory Foster
