= Ward, New Zealand =

Town in Marlborough, New Zealand

Ward
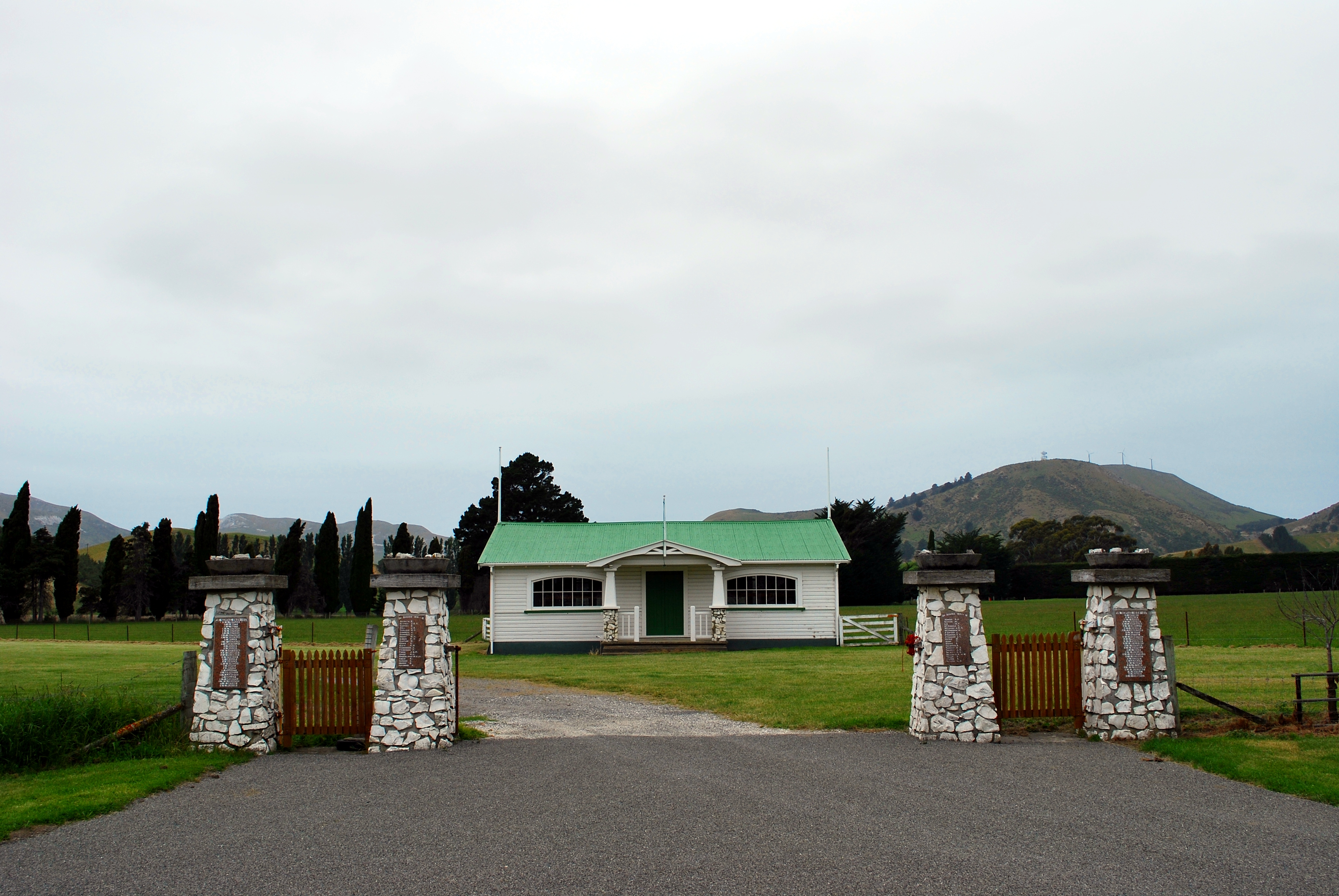
- Interactive map of Ward
- Coordinates: 41°49′38″S 174°8′16″E
- Country: New Zealand
- Region: Marlborough
- Ward: Wairau-Awatere General Ward; Marlborough Māori Ward
- Electorates: Kaikōura; Te Tai Tonga (Māori)

Government
  - Territorial Authority: Marlborough District Council
  - Marlborough District Mayor: Nadine Taylor
  - Kaikōura MP: Stuart Smith
  - Te Tai Tonga MP: Tākuta Ferris

Area
  - Total: 3.56 km^{2} (1.37 sq mi)

Population (June 2025)
  - Total: 80
  - Density: 22/km^{2} (58/sq mi)

Ward is a small town in Marlborough, New Zealand. It is located on State Highway 1, 82 kilometres (51 mi) north of Kaikōura. The Flaxbourne River flows past to the north and into the Pacific Ocean at Ward Beach to the south-east of Ward. A current initiative aims to have the town renamed as Flaxbourne.

== History ==
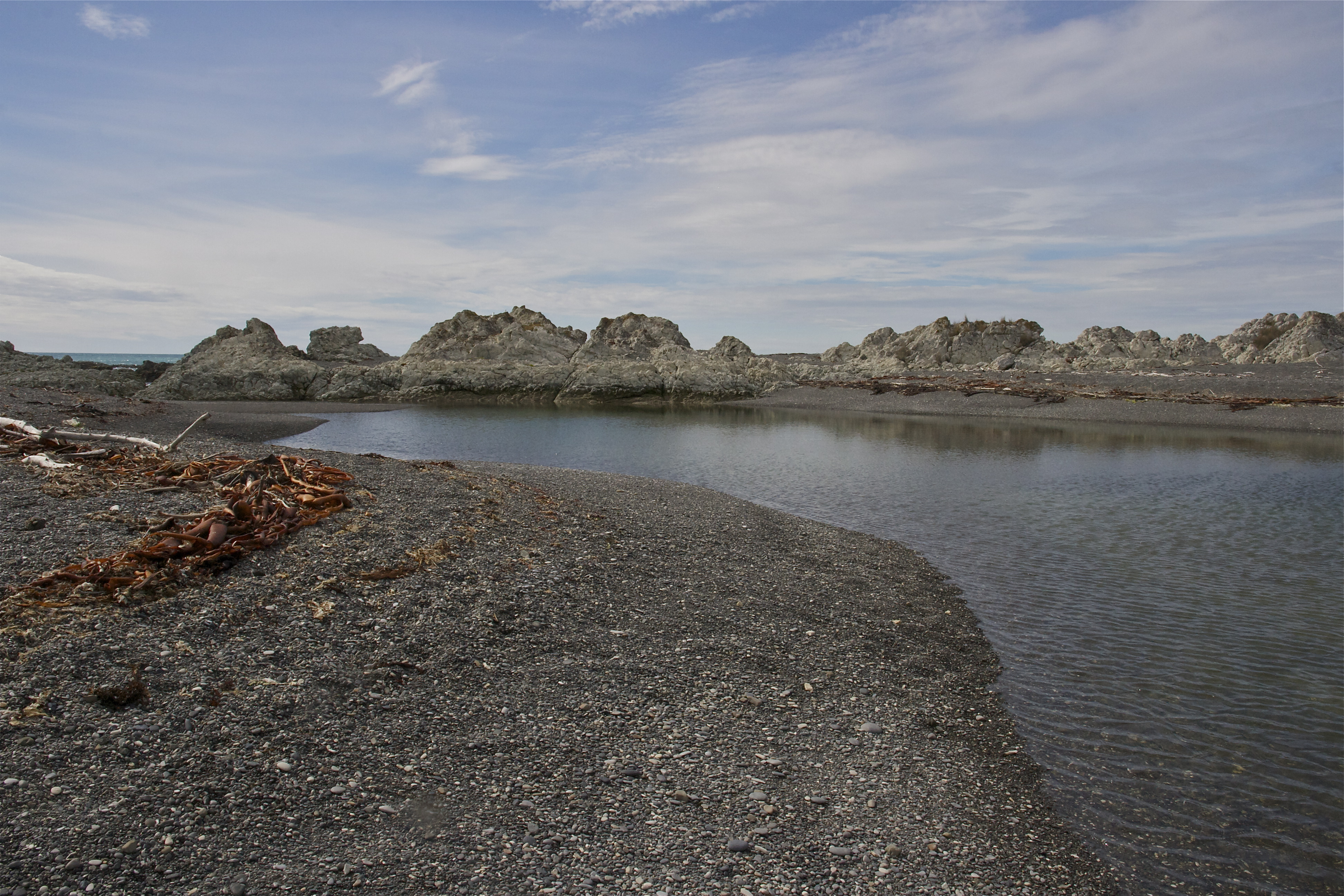
Ward Beach, where the Flaxbourne River flows into the sea

Flaxbourne Station was established in the area around 1847. In 1905, most of the station was subdivided as part of the government's land reform, and Ward township was formed. The area was known by the name of the station. On the initiative of Richard Seddon, who was prime minister at the time, the township was named after his friend and political colleague Joseph Ward; a measure that was controversial at the time. The township of Seddon, named after Richard Seddon at the same time, is 20 kilometres (12 mi) north of Ward.

In 1961 the population was 218.

As of 2017, there is a campaign to have the town renamed as Flaxbourne. The NZ Geographic Board, i.e. the organisation that has the final say on place names in New Zealand, has advised that the name Ward has never been officially registered.

== Demographics ==
Ward is described by Stats NZ as a rural settlement. It covers 3.56 km^{2} (1.37 sq mi) and had an estimated population of 80 as of June 2025, with a population density of 22 people per km^{2}. It is part of the larger Awatere statistical area.

Historical population
Year	Pop.	±% p.a.
2006	102	—
2013	108	+0.82%
2018	81	−5.59%
2023	81	+0.00%

Ward had a population of 81 in the 2023 New Zealand census, unchanged since the 2018 census, and a decrease of 27 people (−25.0%) since the 2013 census. There were 48 males and 36 females in 42 dwellings. 3.7% of people identified as LGBTIQ+. The median age was 53.8 years (compared with 38.1 years nationally). There were 12 people (14.8%) aged under 15 years, 9 (11.1%) aged 15 to 29, 39 (48.1%) aged 30 to 64, and 27 (33.3%) aged 65 or older.

People could identify as more than one ethnicity. The results were 92.6% European (Pākehā), 14.8% Māori, and 7.4% other, which includes people giving their ethnicity as "New Zealander". English was spoken by 100.0%. No language could be spoken by 3.7% (e.g. too young to talk). The percentage of people born overseas was 11.1, compared with 28.8% nationally.

The sole religious affiliation given was 44.4% Christian. People who answered that they had no religion were 55.6%, and 3.7% of people did not answer the census question.

Of those at least 15 years old, 6 (8.7%) people had a bachelor's or higher degree, 45 (65.2%) had a post-high school certificate or diploma, and 18 (26.1%) people exclusively held high school qualifications. The median income was $35,200, compared with $41,500 nationally. 3 people (4.3%) earned over $100,000 compared to 12.1% nationally. The employment status of those at least 15 was 36 (52.2%) full-time and 9 (13.0%) part-time.

== Education ==
Ward School is a coeducational full primary (years 1–8) school with a roll of 55 as of July 2026. It opened in temporary premises in 1906. A celebration to mark 100 years of schooling in the area was held in 2006.

The nearest secondary schools are Marlborough Boys' College and Marlborough Girls' College, both 48 km (30 mi) away in Blenheim.
