= Listed buildings in Little Busby =

Little Busby is a civil parish in the county of North Yorkshire, England. It contains five listed buildings that are recorded in the National Heritage List for England. Of these, three are listed at Grade II*, the middle of the three grades, and the others are at Grade II, the lowest grade. The parish contains the village of Little Busby and the surrounding area. The most important building in the parish is the country house, Busby Hall, which is listed, and all the other listed buildings are associated with the hall.

== Key ==
Grade	Criteria
II*	Particularly important buildings of more than special interest
II	Buildings of national importance and special interest

== Buildings ==
Name and location	Photograph	Date	Notes	Grade
The Old Nursery Wing, Busby Hall; 54.42987°N 1.20679°W		Mid 18th century	Originally a wing of the hall, it was later refronted, and subsequently used for other purposes. It is in sandstone with quoins, and has a pantile roof with a stone ridge and copings. There are two storeys and seven bays. On the front are two doorways in architraves with fanlights, and the windows are sashes in architraves. At the rear are three tall wide buttresses.	II*
Stable range north of Busby Hall; 54.43041°N 1.20702°W	—	Mid 18th century	The stable range, which was later extended, is in sandstone, the older part with a grey pantile roof, and the later roof in Welsh slate. The original range has one storey and a loft, an L-shaped plan and nine bays, and the openings include two segmental-headed carriage arches. The left return has two storeys and five bays, and contains sash windows in the ground floor, and pivoted windows and a loading door above. The left extension has two storeys and three narrow bays, and external wooden stairs.	II
The Old Dairy, Busby Hall; 54.43021°N 1.20667°W	—	Mid 18th century	Originally domestic quarters and later extended, the building is in sandstone on plinths, and a pantile roof with a stone ridge and copings. The main part has two storeys and four bays, and contains sash windows. The other part has one storey and three bays, and contains a doorway with a fanlight, and sash windows.	II
Busby Hall; 54.42967°N 1.20707°W		After 1764	A country house, largely rebuilt after a fire, in sandstone, with a coved moulded eaves cornice, a parapet with a blocking course and a cornice, and a hipped Lakeland slate roof. There are two storeys, and an L-shaped plan with a front range of five bays, the middle bay projecting slightly. In the centre is a round-arched recess containing a doorway in Venetian style, with a radial fanlight and a cornice, and round-arched side lights. The other windows are sashes in architraves. At the rear is a doorway and casement windows.	II*
Walled garden southeast of Busby Hall; 54.42925°N 1.20581°W	—	Late 18th century (probable)	The rectangular garden is enclosed by sandstone walls with stone coping, and are lined inside with red brick. The wall is up to 15 metres (49 ft), it contains three entrances, and at the corners are swept pedestals with ball finials. At the east end is a short spur with another ball finial.	II*
