= Adair baronets =

Extinct baronetcy in the Baronetage of the United Kingdom

Escutcheon of the Adair baronets of Flixton Hall

The Adair Baronetcy, of Flixton Hall in the County of Suffolk, was a title in the Baronetage of the United Kingdom. It was created on 2 August 1838 for Robert Adair. He was succeeded by his eldest son, the second Baronet. He sat as Member of Parliament for Cambridge. In 1873 he was created Baron Waveney, of South Elmham in the County of Suffolk, in the Peerage of the United Kingdom. The barony became extinct on his death in 1886 while he was succeeded in the baronetcy by his younger brother, Hugh Adair, the third Baronet. The latter had earlier represented Ipswich in Parliament. Two of his sons, the fourth and fifth Baronets, both succeeded in the title. The fifth Baronet's son, the sixth Baronet, was a major general in the British Army. The title became extinct on the latter's death in 1988.

== Adair baronets, of Flixton Hall (1838) ==
- Sir Robert Shafto Adair, 1st Baronet (1786–1869)
- Sir Robert Alexander Shafto Adair, 2nd Baronet (1811–1886) (created Baron Waveney in 1873)

== Barons Waveney (1873) ==
- Robert Alexander Shafto Adair, 1st Baron Waveney (1811–1886)

== Adair baronets, of Flixton Hall (1838; reverted) ==
- Sir Hugh Edward Adair, 3rd Baronet (1815–1902)
- Sir Frederick Edward Shafto Adair, 4th Baronet (1860–1915)
- Sir Robert Shafto Adair, 5th Baronet (1862–1949)
- Sir Allan Henry Shafto Adair, 6th Baronet (1897–1988)
  - Desmond Allan Shafto Adair (1920–1943), his son, killed at Mount Camino.

Baronetage of the United Kingdom
Preceded by Marwood-Elton baronets	Adair baronets of Flixton Hall; 2 August 1838	Succeeded by Foster baronets
