= Clifford baronets of the Navy (1838) =

Escutcheon of the Clifford baronets of the Navy

The Clifford baronetcy, of the Navy, was created on 4 August 1838 in the Baronetage of the United Kingdom for Augustus William James Clifford, an illegitimate son of 5th Duke of Devonshire (as son of the 6th Baroness Clifford and himself the 7th one). It became extinct on the death of the 4th Baronet on 22 November 1895.

== Clifford baronets, of the Navy (1838) ==
- Sir Augustus William James Clifford, 1st Baronet (1788–1877)
- Sir William John Cavendish Clifford, 2nd Baronet (1814–1882)
- Sir Robert Cavendish Spencer Clifford, 3rd Baronet (1815–1892)
- Sir Charles Cavendish Clifford, 4th Baronet (1821–1895), extinct 1895

== Notes ==
Baronetage of the United Kingdom
Preceded by Foster baronets	Clifford baronets of the Navy; 4 August 1838	Succeeded by Jephson-Norreys baronets
