= Sir Henry Marwood, 2nd Baronet =

High Sheriff of Yorkshire Henry Marwood
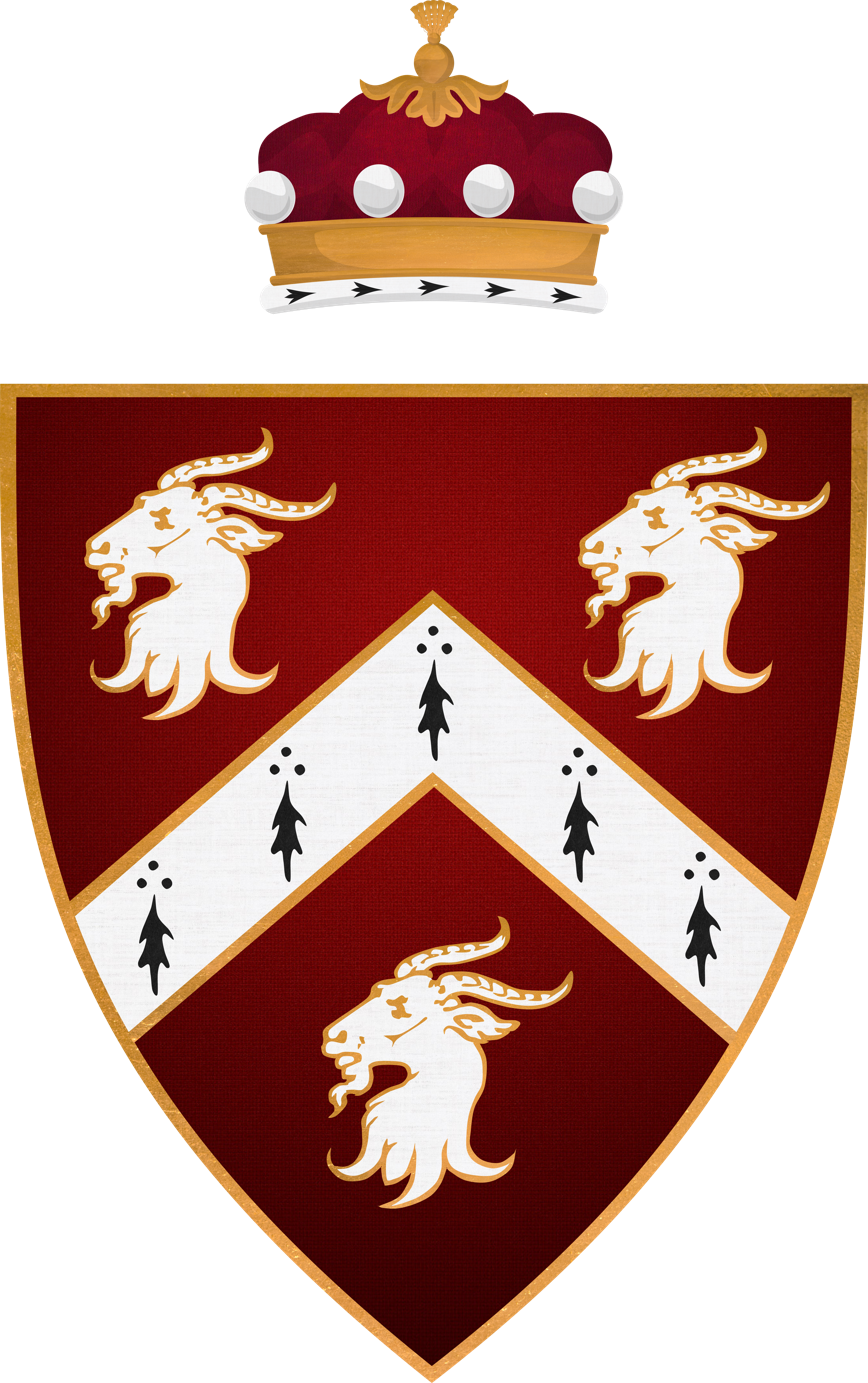
- Born: 1635
- Died: 1725
- Father: Sir George Marwood

Sir Henry Marwood (1635-1725) was an aristocratic landowner who served as High Sheriff of Yorkshire in 1674. He was Member of Parliament for Northallerton from 1685 to 1688.

== Background ==
Marwood was born in 1635 and was the son of Sir George Marwood and Lady Anne Marwood (née Bethell). He was raised at Busby Hall in the North Riding of Yorkshire and succeeded the title of Baronet of Little Busby on the death of his father in 1683. Sir Henry first married Margaret Darcy the daughter of the Earl of Holderness at Hornby Castle in 1658 who died two years later in 1660. He then married Dorothy Bellingham in 1663 who died in 1678. His third and final wife was Martha, daughter of Sir Thomas Wentworth of Elmsall, Yorkshire.

With his second wife Dorothy he had one son and one daughter:

- George Marwood
- Elizabeth Marwood, married John Pierce

Marwood died in 1725. As his son George died in 1700, the baronetcy passed to his nephew Samuel Marwood, the eldest son of his younger brother George.

Baronetage of England
Preceded by George Marwood	Baronet (of Little Busby); 1680–1725	Succeeded by Samuel Marwood
