= Sir George Clifford, 2nd Baronet =

New Zealand businessman (1847–1930)

Sir Sir George Hugh Charles Clifford
- Born: 1847
- Died: 1930 (aged 82–83)
- Occupations: Barrister, businessman, landowner, sportsperson
- Known for: 2nd Baronet Clifford; legal, sporting and business activities in New Zealand
- Title: 2nd Baronet Clifford (from 1893)
- Parent(s): Sir Charles Clifford, 1st Baronet

Sir George Hugh Charles Clifford, 2nd Baronet (1847–1930) was a New Zealand sportsperson, barrister, businessman and landowner. He was the son of politician Sir Charles Clifford, 1st Baronet. He succeeded to the title of 2nd Baronet Clifford, in 1893.

He died on 17 April 1930 at the age of 83.
