= Sir Charles Clifford, 1st Baronet =

New Zealand politician

The Honourable Sir Charles Clifford
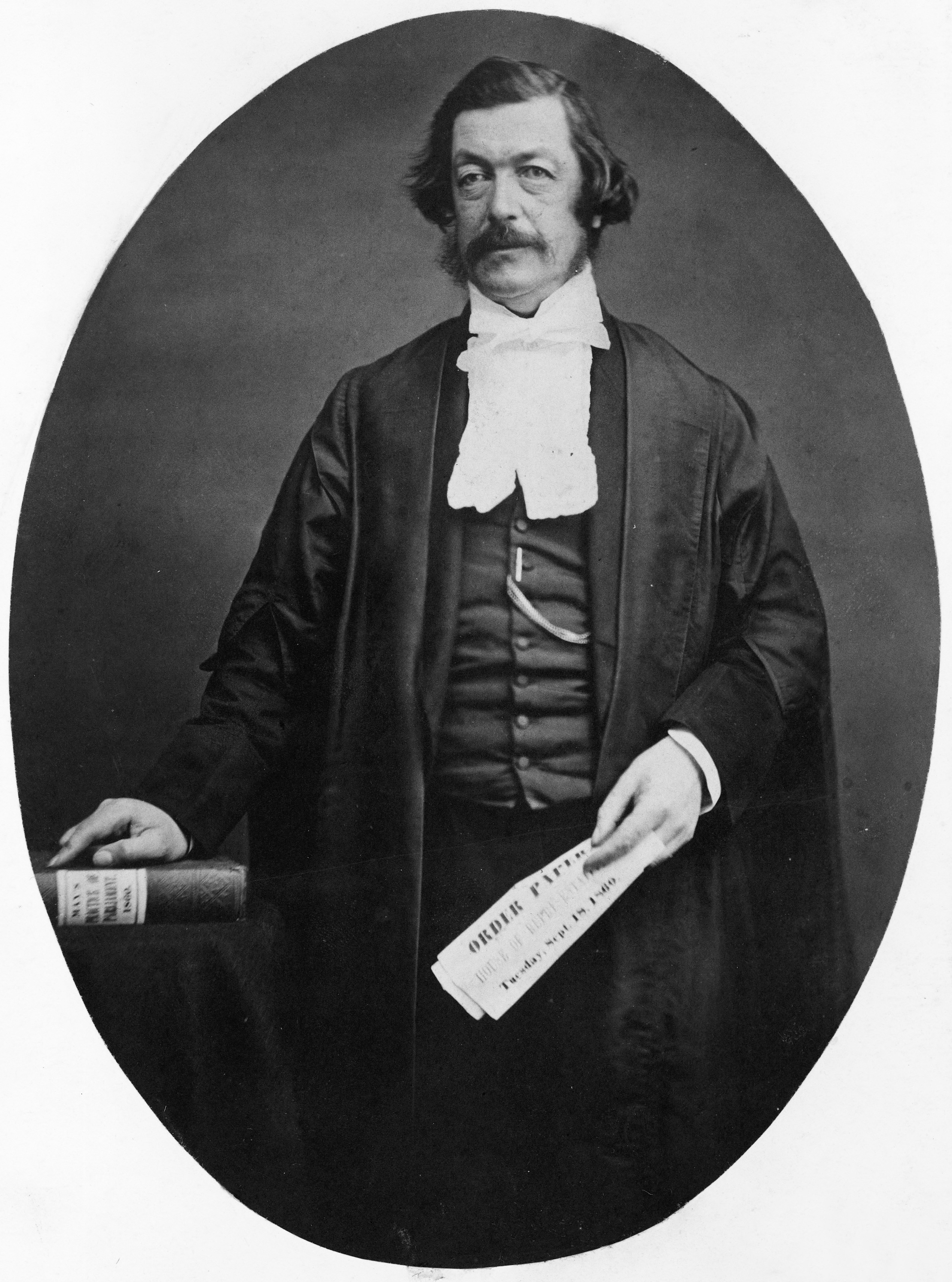
- c. 1860

1st Speaker of the New Zealand House of Representatives
- In office 26 May 1854 – 5 November 1860
- Prime Minister: Henry Sewell
- Preceded by: Office Established
- Succeeded by: David Monro

Member of the New Zealand Parliament for City of Wellington
- In office 14 July 1853 – 12 December 1860 Serving with Robert Hart (1853–1855); James Kelham (1853–1855); Isaac Featherston (1855–1860); Sir William Fitzherbert (1855–1858); William Rhodes (1858 – 1860)
- Succeeded by: William Taylor; Isaac Featherson; William Rhodes

Personal details
- Born: 1 January 1813 Scotforth, Lancashire, England
- Died: 27 February 1893 (aged 80) London, England
- Party: Independent
- Relations: Aroha Clifford (granddaughter)
- Children: Sir George Clifford, 2nd Baronet

Sir Charles Clifford, 1st Baronet (1 January 1813 – 27 February 1893) was a New Zealand politician. He was the first Speaker of the New Zealand House of Representatives, serving from 1854 to 1860.

== Early life and family ==
Clifford was born in Mount Vernon, Scotforth, Lancashire, England, eldest of nine children of George Lambert Clifford (1779–1854), of Wycliffe Hall, Yorkshire ("an elegant mansion with a Catholic Chapel, and beautiful leisure grounds") and of Tixall, Staffordshire, and Mary (died 1854), daughter of Walter Hill Coyney, of Weston Coyney, Stoke-on-Trent, Staffordshire. The family was wealthy and well-connected; George Lambert Clifford- reckoned "stately, yet kindly and gentlemanly"- was paternal grandson of Hugh Clifford, 3rd Baron Clifford of Chudleigh, and maternal grandson of James Aston, 5th Lord Aston of Forfar.

After attending Stonyhurst College (as his father had, being recognised as the very first pupil to enter, commemorated by a bust in his honour at the school) Clifford set out for New Zealand with his cousin William Vavasour, leaving in 1842. Arriving in the New Zealand Company settlement of Wellington, the two established a land, shipping and commissions agency with finance from their parents. They later expanded their holdings, establishing a considerable number of farming ventures. Clifford also worked in partnership with Frederick Weld, another cousin.

At the same time, he was active in the Wellington militia, attaining the rank of captain. He was in charge of Clifford's Stockade in Johnsonville north of Wellington in the mid-1840s. He became a justice of the peace in 1844 and a magistrate in 1846.

In Wellington on 13 January 1847, Clifford married Mary Anne Hercy, third daughter of John Hercy, JP, DL of Cruchfield House, Hawthorn Hill, Berkshire. The couple went on to have five children.

== New Zealand politician ==
New Zealand Parliament
Years	Term	Electorate	Party
1853–1855	1st	City of Wellington	Independent
1855–1860	2nd	City of Wellington	Independent

At the 1853 New Zealand provincial elections, Clifford was elected to the Wellington Provincial Council, representing the City of Wellington.

On 26 May 1854 when the 1st New Zealand Parliament convened, Clifford was unanimously elected Speaker (having previously been Speaker for the Wellington Provincial Council). He remains the youngest ever Speaker, having been appointed at the age of forty-one. He was Member of the New Zealand Parliament for the City of Wellington from 1853 until his retirement as its speaker in 1860.

The most challenging event to arise during Clifford's speakership was the prorogation of Parliament by Robert Wynyard, the acting Governor. Wynyard, objecting to Parliament's denial that it required royal assent to establish New Zealand's self-rule, ordered Parliament to be suspended. Parliament chose to suspend its own standing orders, allowing it to leave Wynyard's instructions officially "unopened" while it continued to debate. The possibility of suspending standing orders was challenged by Wynyard's supporters, but Clifford eventually decided to allow it. Clifford also allowed the proposal and passage of a motion condemning Wynyard's attempt prorogation.

== Retirement and later life ==
Clifford retired from Parliament in 1860, deciding to return to England. He did, however, retain a considerable interest in New Zealand's affairs, and advised British authorities on a number of matters. In 1866, he presented the New Zealand Parliament with a ceremonial mace similar to the one used in the British House of Commons. He also retained considerable business interests in New Zealand. Clifford died in London on 27 February 1893.

== Honours ==
In 1854 on appointment as Speaker of the New Zealand House Representatives Clifford was granted the title of The Honourable. and became The Hon. Charles Clifford Esq. In 1858 Clifford was appointed as a Knight of the United Kingdom of Great Britain and Ireland and became The Hon. Sir Charles Clifford. On 16 July 1887 Clifford was created a baronet, of Flaxbourne, New Zealand, and became The Hon. Sir Charles Clifford Bt., the Clifford-baronetcy became extinct in 2025.

Political offices
New creation	Speaker of the New Zealand House of Representatives; 1854–1860	Succeeded by Dr David Monro
Baronetage of the United Kingdom
New title	Baronet (of Flaxbourne); 1887–1893	Succeeded by George Hugh Charles Clifford
