= Clifford baronets =

There have been two baronetcies created for persons with the surname Clifford.

- Clifford baronets of the Navy (1838)
- Clifford baronets of Flaxbourne (1887)

== See also ==
- Clifford-Constable baronets
