= Foster baronets of Norwich (1838) =

The Foster baronetcy, of Norwich in the County of Norfolk, was created in the Baronetage of the United Kingdom on 3 August 1838 for William Foster, son of William Foster of Norwich and grandson of Sir Thomas Beevor, 1st Baronet MD. The title became extinct on the death of the 4th Baronet in 1960.

== Foster baronets, of Norwich (1838) ==
Escutcheon of the Foster baronets of Norwich

- Sir William Foster, 1st Baronet (1798–1874)
- Sir William Foster, 2nd Baronet (1825–1911)
- Sir William Yorke Foster, 3rd Baronet (1860–1948)
- Sir Henry William Berkeley Foster, 4th Baronet (1892–1960). He left no heir, and the title was extinct on his death.

== Notes ==
Baronetage of the United Kingdom
Preceded by Adair baronets	Foster baronets of Norwich; 3 August 1838	Succeeded by Clifford baronets
