= William Francis Marwood =

Sir William Francis Marwood, KCB (1863–1935) was an English civil servant who served as Permanent secretary to the Board of Trade.

== Life ==
Marwood was born in 1863 the son of George Marwood of Busby Hall in the North Riding of Yorkshire. Marwood was raised in an upper class landowning family of antiquity, he was educated at Tonbridge School and Trinity College, Cambridge. Marwood entered the civil service in 1886 as a Magistrate of the North Riding of Yorkshire, he then became assistant secretary to the Board of Trade (1909–1916), the Second Secretary to the Board of Trade (1916–1918) finally becoming Permanent Secretary in 1918.

Marwood's younger brother, Arthur, was a close personal friend of the author Ford Madox Ford who based the Parade's End characters of the Tietjens brothers on them.
