= Little Busby =

Civil parish in North Yorkshire, England

Coordinates: 54.440199°N 1.216849°W

- Location within North Yorkshire
- Population: 20
- OS grid reference: NZ5078605274
- Civil parish: Little Busby
- Unitary authority: North Yorkshire
- Ceremonial county: North Yorkshire
- Region: Yorkshire and the Humber
- Country: England
- Sovereign state: United Kingdom
- Post town: MIDDLESBROUGH
- Postcode district: TS9
- Police: North Yorkshire
- Fire: North Yorkshire
- Ambulance: Yorkshire

Little Busby is a civil parish in the county of North Yorkshire, England. It is near the North York Moors and Stokesley. It is pronounced little "Buzz - Bee". The population of the parish was estimated at 20 in 2013.

From 1974 to 2023, it was part of the Hambleton District, it is now administered by the unitary North Yorkshire Council.

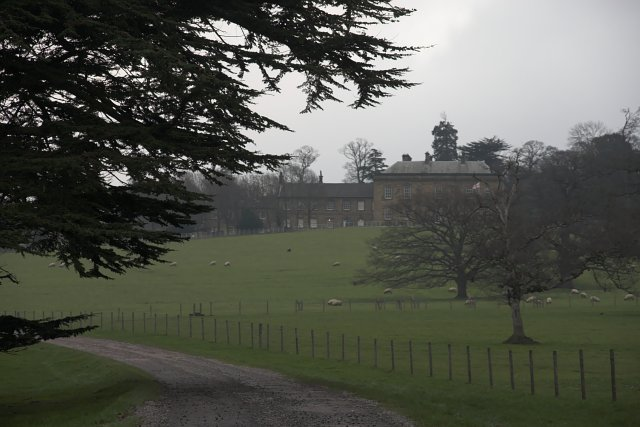
Busby Hall

Busby Hall is a country house, possibly built after a fire of 1764. It is constructed from finely-coursed herringbone-tooled sandstone with a Lakeland slate roof in two storeys to an L-shaped floorplan and has a five-bay frontage. The building is grade II* listed.

== See also ==
- Listed buildings in Little Busby
