= Marwood baronets =

Extinct baronetcy in the Baronetage of England

Marwood Coat of Arms
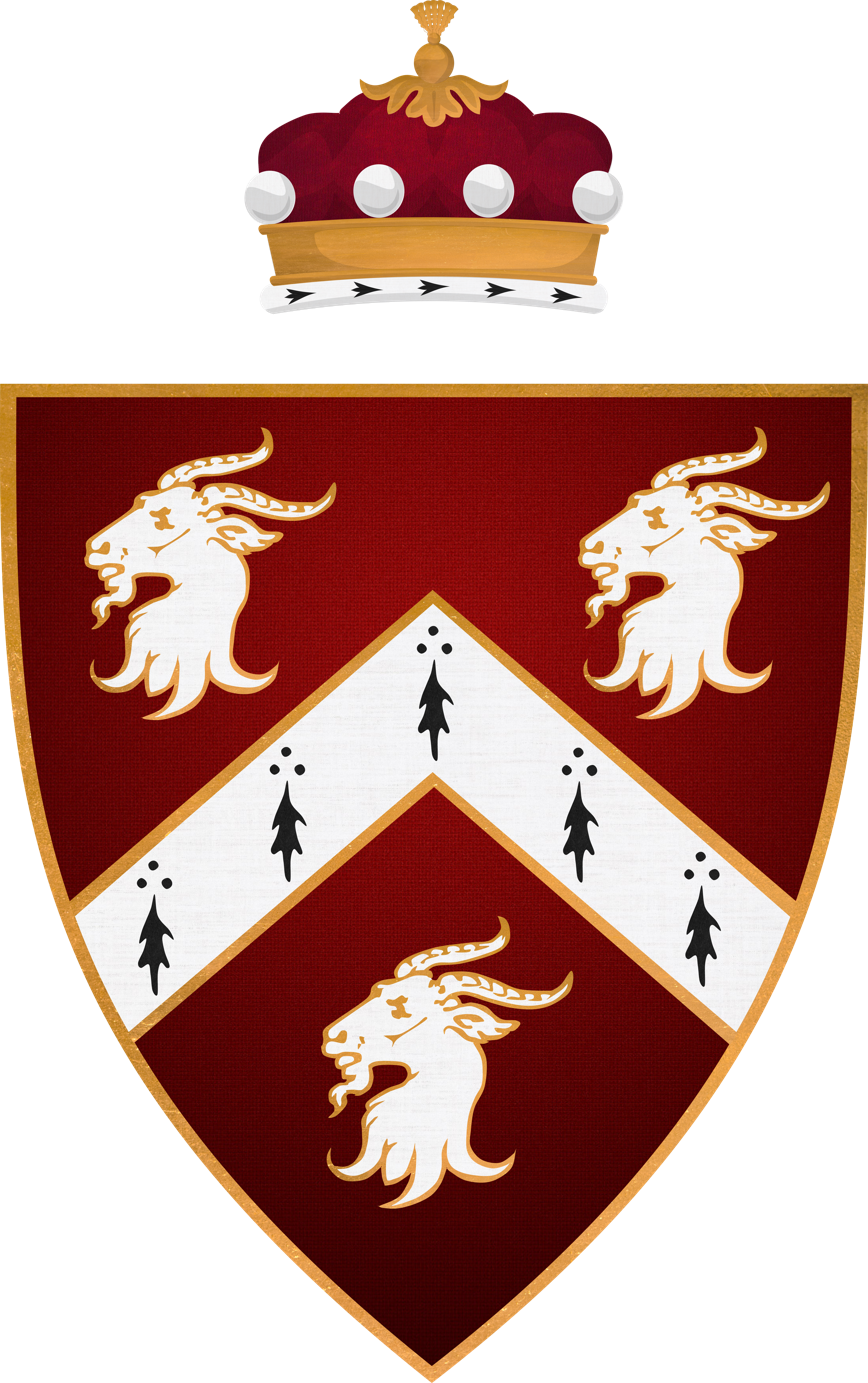
- Adopted: c. 1500

The Marwood Baronetcy, of Little Busby in the County of York, was a title in the Baronetage of England. It was created on 31 December 1660 for George Marwood, Member of Parliament for Malton and Northallerton. The second Baronet also represented Northallerton in Parliament. The title became extinct on the death of the fourth Baronet in 1740.

== Marwood baronets, of Little Busby (1660) ==
- Sir George Marwood, 1st Baronet (1601–1680)
- Sir Henry Marwood, 2nd Baronet (c. 1635–1725)
- Sir Samuel Marwood, 3rd Baronet (c. 1672–1739)
- Sir William Marwood, 4th Baronet (c. 1681–1740)
