= Sir Edward Marwood-Elton, 1st Baronet =

English barrister and Devonshire landowner

Marwood-Elton baronets
- Escutcheon of the Marwood-Elton baronets of Widworthy Court
- Creation date: 1 August 1838
- Status: extinct
- Extinction date: 1884
- Seat(s): Widworthy Court, Devon
- Motto: Artibus et armis, By arts and arms

Sir Edward Marwood-Elton Q.C. (19 May 1800 – 1884) was an English barrister and Devonshire landowner who served as the High Sheriff of Devon in 1858.

== Life ==
Edward Marwood-Elton was born on the 19 May 1800. He was the son of James Marwood-Elton and Anne Storey, both of whom belonged to landed families of Devon.

In 1833, Marwood-Elton purchased the Widworthy Court estate in Devon and commissioned George Stanley Repton to design the replacement principal house. He continued to expand the estate through land acquisitions for the rest of his life.

Marwood-Elton died in 1884, unmarried and without issue. His heir was a cousin, William Elton (1865–1931), who took the surname Marwood-Elton.

Baronetage of the United Kingdom
Preceded by Seale baronets	Marwood-Elton baronets of Widworthy Court; 1 August 1838	Succeeded by Adair baronets
