= Alfred Brandon =

Alfred Brandon may refer to:

- Alfred Brandon (politician) (1809–1886), New Zealand politician
- Alfred Brandon (mayor) (1854–1938), his son, mayor of Wellington, New Zealand, 1893–1894
- Alfred Brandon (RAF officer) (1883–1974), his son, New Zealand lawyer and military aviator
