= Edward Thomas Gillon =

New Zealand journalist and newspaper editor (1842–1896)

- Born: 21 January 1842; Douglas, Isle of Man
- Died: 19 April 1896; Wellington, New Zealand
- Resting place: Bolton Street Cemetery
- Occupations: Journalist, newspaper editor
- Known for: Editor of The Evening Post; Manager of United Press Association
- Office: Member of Wellington Provincial Council (1875–1876); Wellington City Councillor (1875–1876)

Edward Thomas Gillon (21 January 1842 – 19 April 1896) was a New Zealand journalist and newspaper editor.

== Early life ==
Gillon was born on 21 January 1842 in Douglas, Isle of Man. He arrived in New Zealand with his parents in 1851 aboard the ship Maori and settled in Otago, where for several years he endured the rough experiences of settlement in a new country.

== Career ==
While quite a youth he became a contributor to the Otago Witness, and was engaged reporting the Otago Provincial Council proceedings for that paper, when, in 1861, the Otago goldfields were discovered. Gillon was at once sent to Gabriel's Gully as special correspondent for the Otago Witness, and was the first press representative on the diggings. He remained there until recalled to Dunedin to again report in the Provincial Council, and he was so engaged when Julius Vogel arrived from Australia and, entering into partnership with William Cutten, the proprietor of the Otago Witness, established the Otago Daily Times, the first daily paper published in New Zealand. Gillon joined the Otago Daily Times staff as chief reporter, and remained on it until early the following year, when severe illness compelled him to relinquish newspaper work for a time. He accepted a Government appointment which, after two or three years, he resigned to resume journalistic work. In 1867 he went to Wellington as a member of the first Hansard staff, and was subsequently appointed Clerk of Private Bills to the New Zealand Parliament. He resigned this office after a brief tenure in order to devote himself exclusively to literary work, and became connected with The Evening Post as well as acting as special correspondent for the Otago Daily Times, Lyttelton Times, and other leading journals.

He contested the 1871 election, standing in the Wellington Country electorate against Alfred Brandon, who had been representing the area since 1858 (from 1860 to 1870, the area was covered by the Porirua electorate). Whilst there was criticism of Brandon not having had a good connection to his electorate, Brandon won with a solid majority.

On 3 June 1875, Gillon was elected to the Wellington Provincial Council in the City of Wellington electorate. He served until provincial government was abolished in October 1876. From 1875 to 1876 he was a member of the Wellington City Council.

Gillon stood in the 1875 election in the Wellington Country against the incumbent, Brandon, and J. H. Wallace. Brandon was again successful and received 208 votes versus 141 for Gillon, with Wallace a distant last.

In 1872, when cable communication between Europe and Australia was first established, Sir Julius Vogel brought about a combination of New Zealand papers for obtaining supplies of telegraphic news, and Gillon was selected as manager. After a time this association handed its business over to a private firm, and Gillon rejoined The Evening Post as editor. In 1878 another press association was formed, and Gillon was again appointed manager. In less than two years this association absorbed all opposition, and developed into the United Press Association, which Gillon continued to manage with great success until 1884, when he resigned in order to resume his former position of editor of The Evening Post. Gillon was recognised as the doyen of New Zealand journalists, and when the Institute of Journalists was formed he was unanimously chosen as Chairman of the Council. At one time one of the prizes offered by the New Zealand Parliament for the best essays on the settlement of the people on the land was awarded to Gillon. He was a Justice of the Peace, and occupied a prominent position in the Freemasonry. As chairman of the central executive committee, he was the leading spirit in the movement which recently resulted successfully in the establishment of an independent Grand Lodge of New Zealand. As he declined to accept active office, the rank of Past Deputy Grand Master was conferred upon him, in recognition of his services to the craft.

== Death ==
Gillon died in Wellington on 19 April 1896, and he was buried in the Bolton Street Cemetery.
