= 1894 Wellington mayoral election =

New Zealand local election

- 28 November 1894
- Turnout: 1,663
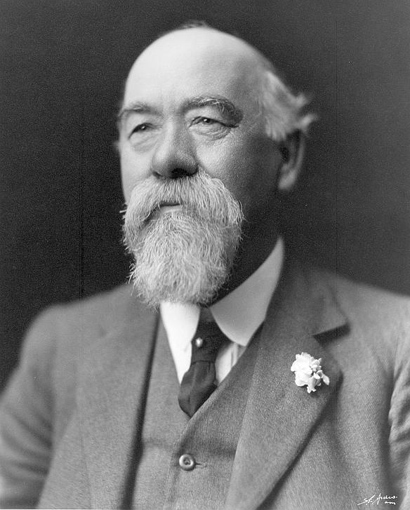

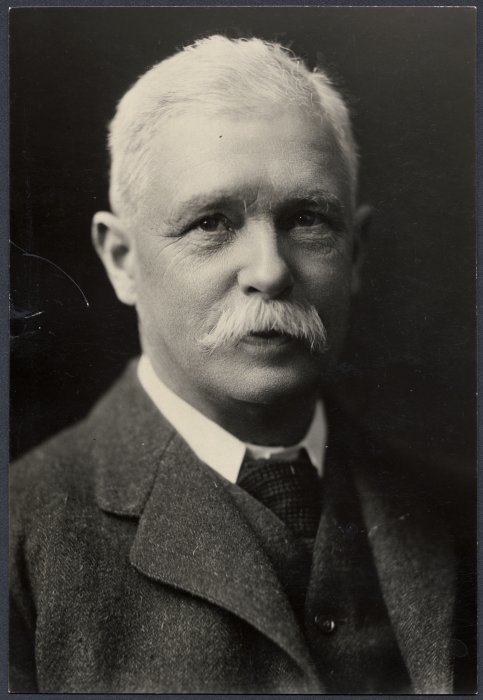
Candidate	Charles Luke	Alfred Brandon
Party	Independent	Independent
Popular vote	786	676
Percentage	47.26	40.64
Mayor before election
Alfred Brandon
Elected mayor
Charles Luke

The 1894 Wellington mayoral election was part of the New Zealand local elections held that same year. The polling was conducted using the standard first-past-the-post electoral method.

== Background ==
In 1894 the incumbent Mayor Alfred Brandon was defeated by Charles Luke, a member of the Wellington Hospital Board.

== Results ==
The following table gives the election results:

1894 Wellington mayoral election
Party	Candidate	Votes	%	±%
Independent	Charles Luke	786	47.27	
Independent	Alfred Brandon	676	40.65	−25.94
Independent	Lionel Lewis Harris	201	12.08	
Majority		110	6.61	
Turnout		1,663		
