= Wellington Country =

Wellington Country was a former parliamentary electorate in the Wellington Region from 1853 to 1860 and then 1871 to 1881. The seat covered Miramar, Mākara, Porirua, the Kāpiti Coast and the Horowhenua District.

== History ==
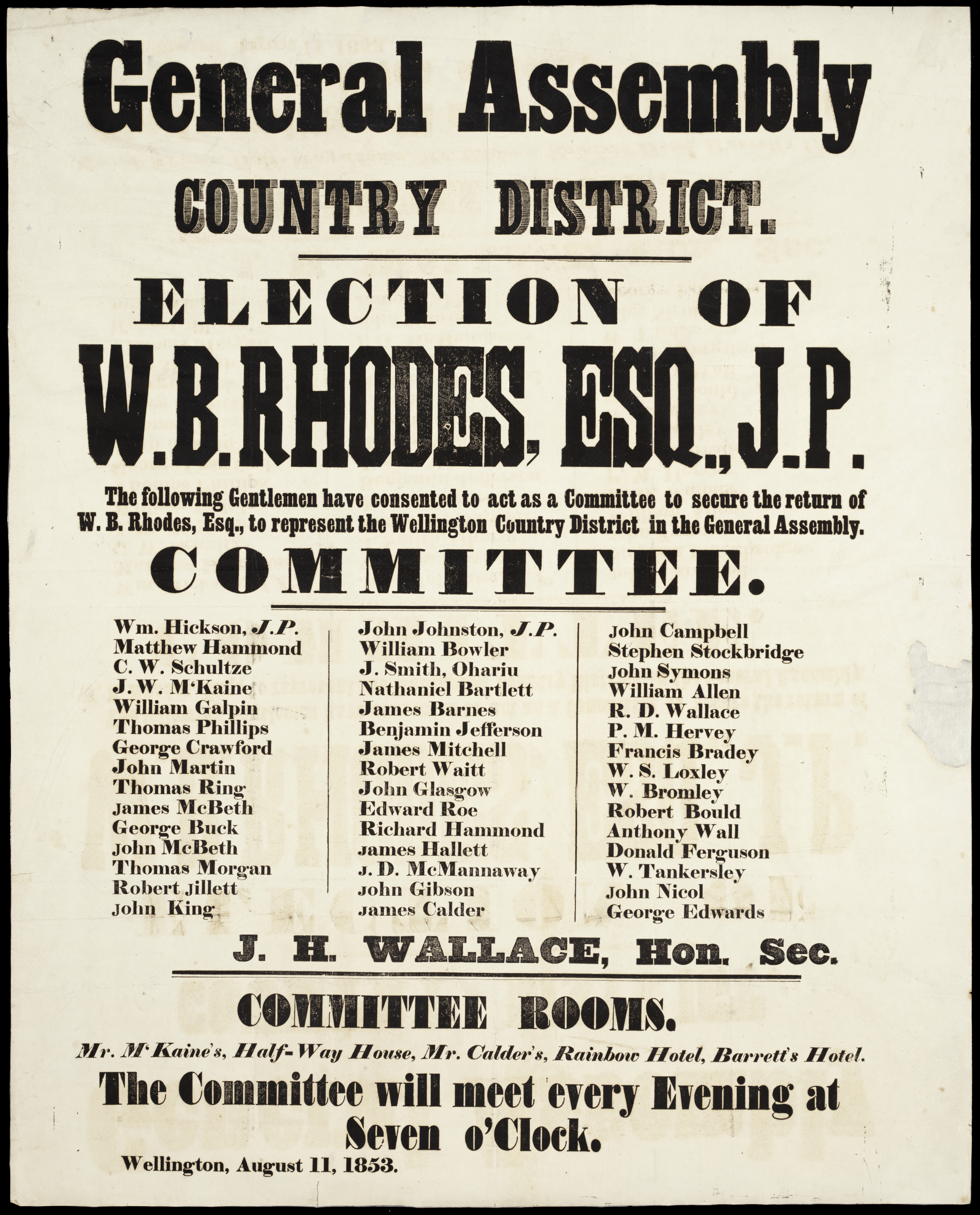
Election poster in support of William Barnard Rhodes, standing for Wellington Country in 1853

William Barnard Rhodes was the first representative of Wellington Country. He served until the dissolution of Parliament in 1855 and (unsuccessfully) contested the City of Wellington electorate instead. The 1855 election was won by Dudley Ward, who resigned in 1858. The ensuing 1858 by-election was won by Alfred Brandon, who served until the dissolution of Parliament in 1860.

From 1860 to 1870, Wellington Country was replaced by the Porirua electorate, held by Brandon. Wellington Country was re-established for the 1871 election. Brandon was challenged by Edward Thomas Gillon. Whilst there was criticism of Brandon not having had a good connection to his electorate, Brandon won with a solid majority. The next election in 1875 was contested by Gillon, Brandon, and J. H. Wallace. Brandon was again successful and received 208 votes versus 141 for Gillon, with Wallace a distant last. Brandon won the 1879 election and at the end of the parliamentary term in 1881, he retired from politics, and the Wellington Country electorate was abolished.

From 1911 to 1919 the geographic area was combined with Wellington Suburbs into Wellington Suburbs and Country.

== Members ==
The electorate was represented by three Members of Parliament.

Key

Independent

Election	Winner
1853 election	William Barnard Rhodes
1855 election	Dudley Ward
1858 by-election	Alfred Brandon
(Electorate abolished 1860–1871, see Porirua)
1871 election	Alfred Brandon
1875 election	Alfred Brandon
1879 election	Alfred Brandon

== Election results ==
=== 1858 by-election ===
1858 Wellington Country by-election
Party	Candidate	Votes	%	±%
Independent	Alfred Brandon	268	86.73	−
Independent	Francis Bradey (Note: full name is Francis Henry Badey, but common name does not use his middle name)	41	13.27	−
Majority		227	73.46	−
Total votes		309	-	-

== Bibliography ==
- Scholefield, Guy (1950) [First published in 1913]. New Zealand Parliamentary Record, 1840–1949 (3rd ed.). Wellington: Govt. Printer.
- Wilson, Jim (1985) [First published in 1913]. New Zealand Parliamentary Record, 1840–1984 (4th ed.). Wellington: V.R. Ward, Govt. Printer. OCLC 154283103.
