= 1858 Wellington Country by-election =

New Zealand by-election

The 1858 Wellington Country by-election was a New Zealand by-election held in the single-member electorate of Wellington Country during the 2nd New Zealand Parliament on 29 July 1858, following the resignation of Dudley Ward. The election was won by Alfred Brandon, who beat the only other candidate, Francis Bradey, easily.

== Results ==
1858 Wellington Country by-election
Party	Candidate	Votes	%	±%
Independent	Alfred Brandon	268	86.73	−
Independent	Francis Bradey (Note: full name is Francis Henry Badey, but common name does not use his middle name)	41	13.27	−
Majority		227	73.46	−
Total votes		309	-	-

=== Results by polling booth ===
Polling booth	Brandon	Bradey
Town	127	39
Karori	29	1
Porirua Road	32	0
Pahautanui	27	0
Otaki	21	0
Manawatu	32	1
Total	268	41
