= John Luke (New Zealand politician) =

New Zealand politician (1858–1931)

The Honourable Sir John Luke CMG
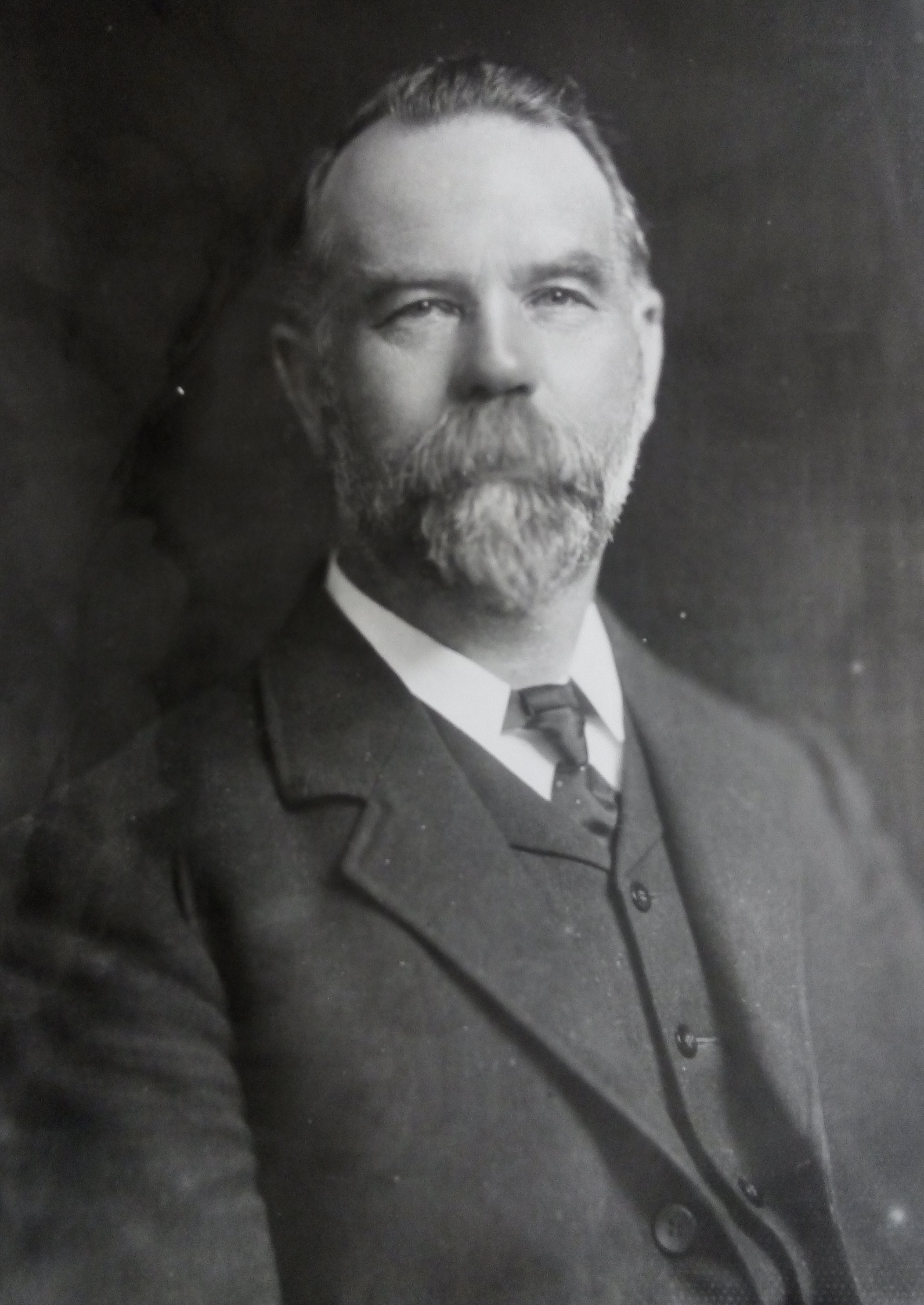

Member of the New Zealand Parliament for Wellington North
- In office 12 February 1918 – 14 November 1928
- Preceded by: Alexander Herdman
- Succeeded by: Charles Chapman

20th Mayor of Wellington
- In office 30 April 1913 – 9 May 1921
- Deputy: George Frost
- Preceded by: David McLaren
- Succeeded by: Robert Wright

Member of the New Zealand Parliament for Wellington Suburbs
- In office 2 December 1908 – 7 December 1911

Personal details
- Born: 16 July 1858 Penzance, Cornwall, England
- Died: 7 December 1931 (aged 73) Wellington, New Zealand
- Party: Liberal (1908–1914); Reform (1914–1928)
- Spouse: Jacobina McGregor (m. 1880)
- Relations: Charles Luke (brother)

Sir John Pearce Luke CMG (16 July 1858 – 7 December 1931) was a New Zealand politician. Luke was Mayor of Wellington from 1913 to 1921 and Member of Parliament for Wellington Suburbs 1908–1911 and Wellington North 1918–1928. His brother Charles Manley Luke had previously also been Mayor of Wellington in 1895. Sir John Pearce was nicknamed Peanut because he was short.

== Early life ==
Born at St Just, near Penzance, Cornwall, England, to Samuel and Ann Luke, John Luke came to New Zealand with his parents in July 1874 after the Cornish tin industry failed. He completed two years of an apprenticeship as an engineer before leaving for Feilding, New Zealand from where, the family were informed, they would be able to take up engineering work 50 kilometres away on the coast at Foxton while they developed the Fielding property. However, "When the Luke's landed at Wellington they discovered that Foxton was merely a paper township; it was a name on the map and the only industry there was the extraction of pipis from the beach by Maoris." Luke completed his engineering apprenticeship with The Lion Foundry, and worked on various projects before joining his father's newly established Te Aro Engineering Works in 1879. After initially struggling the business was successful and constructed several steamships. In June 1886 his oldest brother William died "after a short and painful illness in his 34th year" followed by his next oldest brother, Samuel, at 32 years of age, in December.

== City council and mayor ==
Luke was first elected to the city council in 1898. For many years he was president of the New Zealand Engineers and Iron Masters Association, and was actively associated with the Wellington Industrial Association, the Wellington District Hospital Board, the Wellington Technical Education Board, and the Navy League.

Luke contested the 1905 Wellington City mayoral election and of the six candidates, he came fourth, with Thomas William Hislop elected.

John Luke showed leadership and courage during the 1918 flu epidemic. He was a prominent abstainer. All hotel bars were closed, but some local doctors said that alcoholic stimulants were a vital nostrum for their patients. So the Town Hall was a distribution point for prescribed spirits for them, and Mayor Luke took charge of "the Town Hall bar". One hopeful said to Luke that he hadn't got an order (for a bottle of brandy), but he could get one from his doctor. "Who is your doctor?" said Luke, then "he's here in my room now, I'll bring him out". When he returned with the doctor, all that could be heard was the clatter of his boots as he disappeared down the corridor.

In 1920 Luke hosted a lavish town hall reception for the visit of the Prince of Wales.

== Member of Parliament ==
New Zealand Parliament
Years	Term	Electorate	Party
1908–1911	17th	Wellington Suburbs	Liberal
1918–1919	19th	Wellington North	Reform
1919–1922	20th	Wellington North	Reform
1922–1925	21st	Wellington North	Reform
1925–1928	22nd	Wellington North	Reform

His parliamentary career began in 1908 with his election as member for Wellington Suburbs for the Liberal Party, but he lost his seat at the 1911 general election to Reform candidate William Henry Dillon Bell. From 1911 until 1918 he was not a member of Parliament, and was defeated for Wellington South, standing now as a Reform candidate, by Labour's Alfred Hindmarsh in 1914. He was re-elected to Parliament in the 1918 by-election as a member of the Reform Party and again 1919, in the Wellington North electorate. After the 1922 election he was put forward as a candidate for Speaker of the House of Representatives after the previous speaker Sir Frederic Lang lost his parliamentary seat. As the Reform government had lost their overall majority, Luke declined nomination for speaker to allow an independent MP, Charles Statham, to become speaker thereby helping the government's voting strength. He held this electorate continuously until the 1928 general election, when he was defeated by the Labour candidate Charles Chapman, by a margin of 47 votes.

Luke was married in 1880 to Jacobina McGregor. He appointed a Knight Bachelor in the 1921 King's Birthday Honours, having previously been made a Companion of the Order of St Michael and St George in the 1917 King's Birthday Honours. He was leader of the New Zealand delegation which visited South Africa in 1924 in connection with the Empire Parliamentary Association. He died suddenly on 7 December 1931, and was survived by his wife, four sons, and one daughter. His funeral service was held at St. Paul's Cathedral in Wellington, followed by a private cremation, with his ashes buried at Karori Cemetery.

== Miscellanea ==
- Lukes Lane in the Wellington CBD is named after the family business, Lukes' Foundry, which was sited there; years later, Sir John Pearce's sons set up Luke Bros foundry near Chaffers Street. Lukes' Foundry built New Zealand's first steel ship, and several lighthouses.
- Sir John Pearce and his wife, Lady Jacobina Luke, donated the decorative iron gates at the entrance to Central Park, in Brooklyn, Wellington.
- Lady Luke was President of the Victoria League Wellington Branch from 1920 to 1922

New Zealand Parliament
In abeyance Title last held by Thomas Wilford	Member of Parliament for Wellington Suburbs; 1908–1911	In abeyance Title next held by Robert Wright
Preceded by Alexander Herdman	Member of Parliament for Wellington North; 1918–1928	Succeeded by Charles Chapman
Political offices
Preceded by David McLaren	Mayor of Wellington; 1913–1921	Succeeded by Robert Wright
