= William Cable & Company =

William Cable & Company was a heavy engineering business in Kaiwharawhara, Wellington, New Zealand established as the Lion Foundry in 1856 by Edward William Mills. In 1881 Mills took in William Cable as a partner and in 1883 Cable bought him out.

Their business included the supply and manufacture of structural steel, industrial machinery, ferrous and non-ferrous castings, galvanising, boiler making, ship repair and maintenance, electrical engineering services, electrical jib and overhead cranes.

William Cable & Company joined with Auckland region founders and engineers A&G Price in 1951 to form Cable Price Corporation; now owned by Hitachi Construction Machinery.

== The Lion Foundry ==
=== Edward William Mills ===
This business was established by E. W. Mills (1829–1900) in 1856 in Aurora Terrace (later the site of his large house Sayes Court, beside the Wellington Club on The Terrace) as the Lion Foundry. The foundry, which by then employed 120 men, was moved in March 1871 to reclaimed land by the harbour at Waring Taylor Street extending to Customhouse Quay about 1872. Steamers and locomotives were built and repaired on the waterfront site. Major contracts were undertaken for railways, shipping, tramways, sawmills and the like.

=== William Cable ===
William Cable (1848–1922) was appointed foundry manager in 1872 then became a partner of E W Mills. The business operated under the name Mills & Cable. C M Luke and John Luke were on the foundry staff at this time. Wellington's first telephone — without an exchange — was installed by Mills in 1878 between his various business premises. Cable took full ownership of Lion Foundry in 1883.

=== Cable-Price ===
The merchandising interests of Cable's and its foundry were merged with A&G Price in 1951 and Cable Price Corporation was incorporated. It is now a subsidiary of Hitachi Construction Machinery.

== E W Mills and Briscoe ==
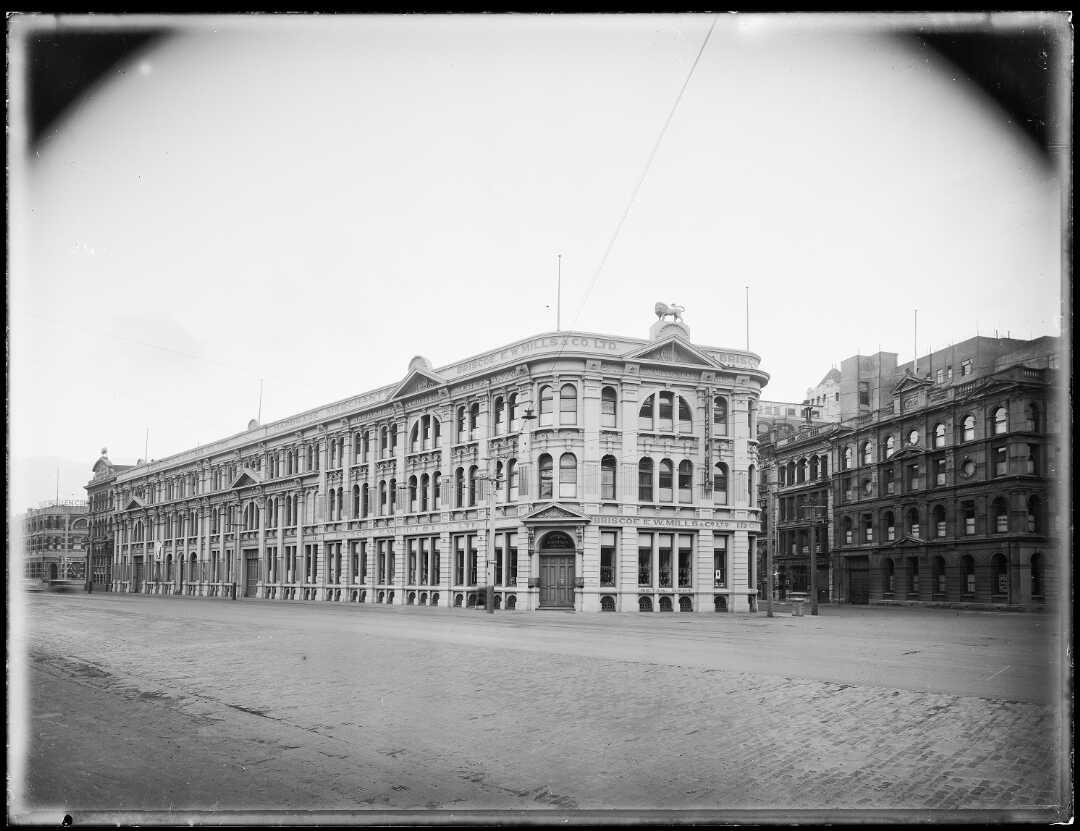
E W Mills' warehouses built 1897 on Jervois Quay corner of Hunter Street and Victoria Street circa 1940

Mills sold out to Cable to devote his time and money to E W Mills & Co, his substantial ironmongery business he had founded earlier in 1854 in Lambton Quay and now also with a second warehouse in Featherston Street, which stocked bulk-oils, galvanised iron safes and strong-room doors, stoves bedsteads and bolts and nuts and many other items, agricultural equipment and machinery, operated a ships chandlery and supplied customers across the whole country.

In 1932 Briscoe and Co whose business was also hardware and iron and steel merchants amalgamated with — then family-controlled by an 80 per cent shareholding — E W Mills to form Briscoe E W Mills each owning half the capital. The Mills name was dropped and the business is now known as Briscoe Group. Briscoe E. W. Mills and Company Limited changed its name to Briscoes (New Zealand) Limited 29 September 1961.
