= Graham Kelly (politician) =

New Zealand politician

Graham Kelly QSO
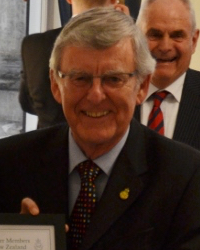
- Kelly in 2014

19th High Commissioner of New Zealand to Canada
- In office 29 July 2003 – October 2006
- Prime Minister: Helen Clark
- Preceded by: Wade Armstrong
- Succeeded by: Kate Lackey

Member of the New Zealand Parliament for Labour party list
- In office 27 July 2002 – 29 July 2003
- Succeeded by: Moana Mackey

Member of the New Zealand Parliament for Mana Porirua (1987–1996)
- In office 15 August 1987 – 27 July 2002
- Preceded by: Gerry Wall
- Succeeded by: Winnie Laban

Personal details
- Born: 9 May 1941
- Party: Labour
- Spouse: Janette Kelly
- Children: 5
- Profession: Trade unionist

Graham Desmond Kelly QSO (born 9 May 1941) is a New Zealand former politician.

== Early life and career ==
Kelly was born in Wellington on 9 May 1941. He married and had five children.

Kelly was trade unionist and was employed by the Clerical Workers' Union until 1973 when he became secretary of the Shop Employees' Union.

== Member of Parliament ==
New Zealand Parliament
Years	Term	Electorate	List	Party
1987–1990	42nd	Porirua		Labour
1990–1993	43rd	Porirua		Labour
1993–1996	44th	Porirua		Labour
1996–1999	45th	Mana	13	Labour
1999–2002	46th	Mana	17	Labour
2002–2003	47th	List	26	Labour

As a trade union member he became involved in the Labour Party, joining the party in 1963 and was a longtime member of the Wellington Central electorate committee. In the lead up to the 1987 general election he stood as a candidate to replace Gerry Wall, the retiring MP for Porirua, as the Labour candidate. In a highly contested selection meeting Kelly was chosen ahead of former All Black and local regional councillor Ken Gray. The selection was criticised by local residents who were critical of Kelly not living in the electorate and suspicions of media reports around an organised campaign to select trade unionists for all open safe seats ahead of the 1987 election. Kelly dismissed the criticism of his and other unionists selections stating he was "his own person" and his background in unions motivated him to be a representative of working people in the area. He also pledged to move from his home in Khandallah to the Porirua area.

He was elected and served as MP for Porirua from 1987 until the 1996 election, when he became MP for the new seat of Mana. He was among several backbenchers elected in 1987 that opposed the Labour government's controversial Rogernomics reforms. He opposed the introduction of Goods and Services Tax before entering parliament and after being elected opposed the proposed flat tax rate, arguing each unfairly distributed taxation burdens on to working class people. He was also critical of how independent cabinet decision making was and campaigned for more substantive input into decisions by the party caucus.

In November 1990, he was appointed as Labour's spokesperson for Fisheries and Senior Citizens by Labour leader Mike Moore. Kelly supported Helen Clark in her successful leadership challenge to Moore after the 1993 election. Under Clark he lost the Senior Citizens portfolio while retaining Fisheries and additionally appointed Shadow Minister of Broadcasting from 1993 to 1996. From 1996 to 1999 his responsibilities shifted again and he was Shadow Minister of Housing and Overseas Aid.

In the 2002 election, he did not stand as an electorate candidate, standing as a list MP and allowing Luamanuvao Winnie Laban to contest Mana. On 29 July 2003, however, he left Parliament in order to take up a position as High Commissioner to Canada. His list seat was taken by the next candidate on Labour's 2002 party list, Moana Mackey.

== High Commissioner to Canada ==
In 2005, Kelly made remarks to a Canadian governmental panel which were regarded by some in New Zealand as offensive to Māori and various immigrant communities. Calls were made for his resignation, and the government criticised Kelly for his comments, for which he apologised.

== Later career ==
Kelly is currently the president of the Association of Former Members of Parliament.

== Honours ==
In the 2004 Queen's Birthday Honours, Kelly was appointed a Companion of the Queen's Service Order for public services.

New Zealand Parliament
Preceded by Gerry Wall	Member of Parliament for Porirua; 1987–1996	Constituency abolished
New constituency	Member of Parliament for Mana; 1996–2002	Succeeded by Winnie Laban
Diplomatic posts
Preceded by Wade Armstrong	High Commissioner to Canada; 2003–2006	Succeeded by Kate Lackey
