= Gerry Wall =

New Zealand surgeon and politician

The Honourable Sir Gerard Wall FRCS
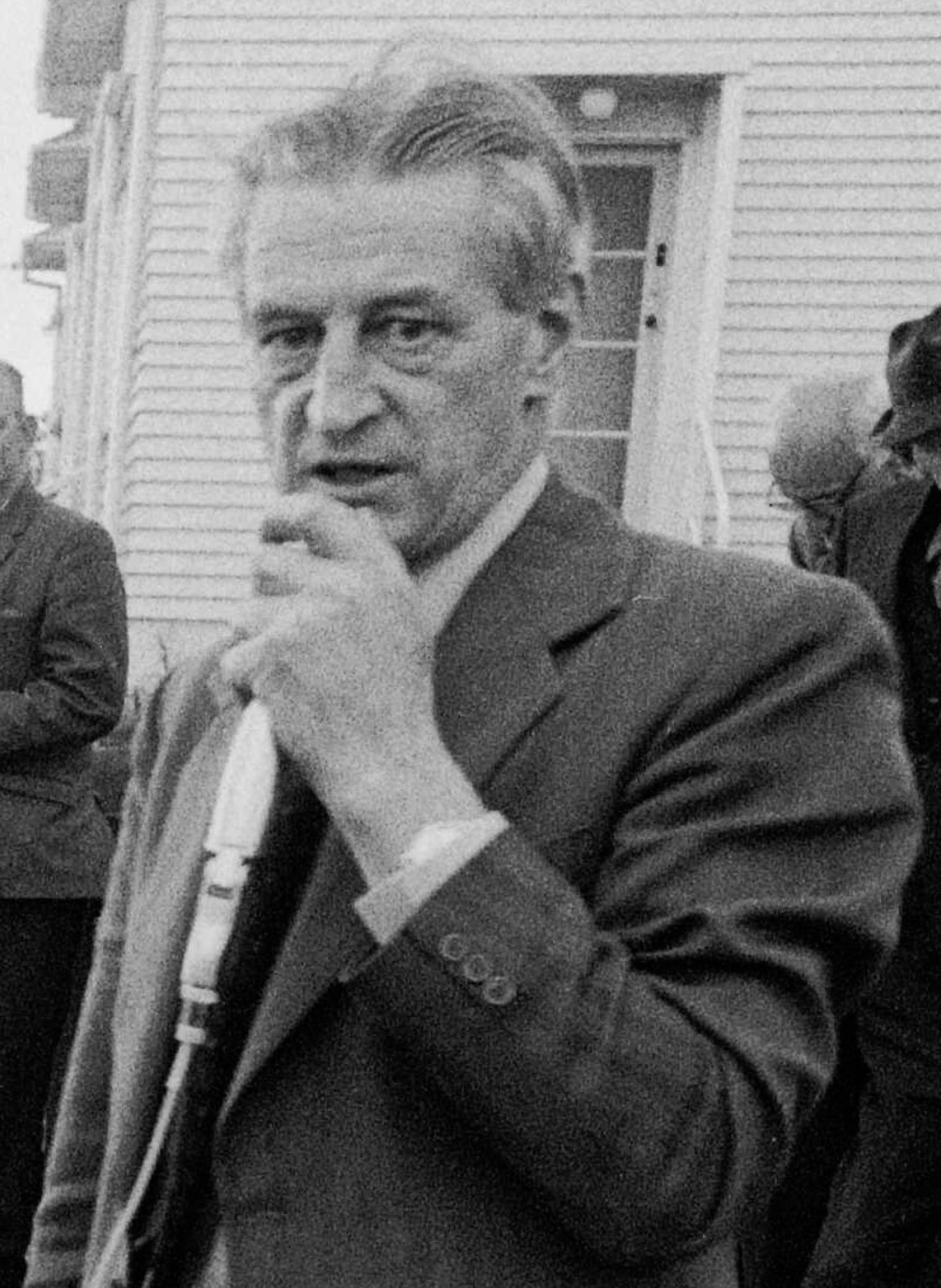
- Wall speaking in 1972

21st Speaker of the House of Representatives
- In office 28 May 1985 – 16 September 1987
- Prime Minister: David Lange
- Deputy: John Terris
- Preceded by: Sir Basil Arthur
- Succeeded by: Kerry Burke

Member of the New Zealand Parliament for Porirua
- In office 29 November 1969 – 15 August 1987
- Preceded by: Henry May
- Succeeded by: Graham Kelly

Personal details
- Born: 24 January 1920 Christchurch, New Zealand
- Died: 22 November 1992 (aged 72) Wellington, New Zealand
- Party: Labour
- Spouse: Uru Raupo Cameron
- Children: 5
- Profession: Doctor

Sir Gerard Aloysius Wall (24 January 1920 – 22 November 1992) was a surgeon and a politician in New Zealand. He was Speaker of the New Zealand House of Representatives from 1985 to 1987. He was a member of the Labour Party.

Wall was noted for his firmly held socially conservative views and opposition to legalising abortion and homosexuality, which frequently brought him into conflict with his contemporaries. Porirua mayor John Burke said of Wall "He was a man who had the courage of his convictions – if he felt strongly about any issue it concerned him little who or how many disagreed."

== Biography ==
=== Early life and career ===
Born in Christchurch, New Zealand, in 1920, he was the son of Edmund Wall. He was educated at St Bede's College then attended Canterbury University College for two years studying law before instead deciding on a career in medicine. To earn enough money to pay for his medical studies he worked at various times on farms as a labourer, shearer, shed hand, and musterer. He completed courses at the University of Otago, graduating with an MBChB. After graduation he worked as a house surgeon in Christchurch and as a general practitioner in Denniston on the West Coast.

He then went to Britain and qualified as a Fellow of the Royal College of Surgeons, specialising in orthopaedic and plastic surgery. On return to New Zealand he became medical superintendent of Wairau Hospital, Blenheim from 1960 until 1969.

=== Political career ===
New Zealand Parliament
Years	Term	Electorate	Party
1969–1972	36th	Porirua	Labour
1972–1975	37th	Porirua	Labour
1975–1978	38th	Porirua	Labour
1978–1981	39th	Porirua	Labour
1981–1984	40th	Porirua	Labour
1984–1987	41st	Porirua	Labour

Wall first entered politics at a local level and was a member of both the Marlborough Hospital Board and Blenheim Borough Council for two terms. He was also elected a member of the Labour Party's executive.

While in Blenheim, he first stood for Parliament in the 1966 election against the incumbent Tom Shand of the National Party in the Marlborough electorate, cutting Shand's majority from 2,111 to 732, but was unsuccessful. Soon afterwards was invited to contest the Labour nomination in the 1967 Petone by-election. As a non-resident of the Wellington area, his mentioning caused surprise, ultimately however he was not selected as the candidate. The family moved to Porirua in 1968 and was on the staff of Porirua Hospital for one year. Ahead of the 1969 election he put himself forward for the Labour Party nomination to stand in the newly created Porirua electorate. He beat out 11 other candidates including the mayors of Porirua and Wellington (Whitford Brown and Sir Frank Kitts). He won the Porirua electorate (which neighboured the Petone electorate) in 1969. Once in parliament he was a member of the Social Services and Maori Affairs select committees.

Wall was a member of the Catholic faith and his socially conservative views frequently led him to clash with other Labour MPs and party members. He, like Norman Kirk, was staunchly opposed abortion. At the 1972 Labour Party conference Wall chaired the health policy committee. A pro-choice remit was submitted to the committee reading "That the Labour Party when it becomes the government will give favourable consideration to liberalising the present legislation on abortion" which Wall recommended be amended to instead read "That we acknowledge the growing interest and concern to the world over the moral, medical and social problems involved in abortion. We believe that such a grave moral, medical and social issue is not one for hasty action, and that steps should be taken to establish reliably and authoritatively all relevant information and facts on abortion in New Zealand before any action is considered" which caused a notably heated debate on the conference floor. His opposition to abortion went as far as to introduce a bill aimed at closing private abortion clinics. Wall's next clash with colleagues came over the Crimes Amendment Bill 1975 which would have legalised "homosexual acts" between consenting males over 20, which he opposed. Wall went as far as to propose a two-year prison sentence for anyone telling persons under the age of 20 that homosexual behavior was normal. When the vote was held Wall (as Speaker) did not vote against the bill however.

Wall had a reputation as a "prickly character" and his inclination to follow his convictions, even when they contradicted his colleagues, cost him political advancement. Consequently, he was overlooked for a place in cabinet during both the Third and Fourth Labour Governments. He was also thrice challenged for the Labour Party nomination in Porirua. In the lead up to the 1975 election he was challenged for the nomination by Rosslyn Noonan, a feminist activist, in protest to his anti-abortion stance and members bill to close private abortion clinics, but was successful in defeating her challenge. Ahead of the 1978 election he was again challenged for the nomination by Reverend Don Borrie, a local Presbyterian minister, believing Wall was "out of touch" with his constituents particularly regarding health issues. Wall was reselected by the Labour Party and claimed his reselection was an "absolute" endorsement of his stances on issues such as abortion. In the lead up to the 1981 election the Porirua Labour Electorate Committee passed a motion of no confidence in him as part of an unsuccessful attempt to de-select him as the candidate. Parliamentary colleague Mike Moore said "He [Wall] was a man of fierce and strong opinions ... he was a unique character who made great sacrifices for his principles." In early 1980 he had been a member of the New Zealand Election Observation Group sent to Zimbabwe to impartially oversee that year's election.

He was elected as Speaker following Sir Basil Arthur's death in 1985 and served in this role until 1987. Prior to this Wall had been upset at being passed over for any responsibilities following Labour's victory and thus took to the role of speaker with enthusiasm. Colleagues thought he had a tendency to overdo his role and was too tough on opposition MPs, almost everyone was ejected from the chamber at least once during his two years as speaker. As speaker he was the target of an unprecedented attack on his integrity by Sir Robert Muldoon in 1986. Muldoon issued a lengthy statement criticising how he thought Wall chaired sessions, particularly Wall's predilection for ejecting members from the house. Muldoon had previously moved a motion of no confidence in Wall (a rare occurrence) which was defeated.

A Labour Party rule necessitated his retirement after reaching 65 and he reluctantly retired at the 1987 election. He was replaced in the Porirua electorate by Graham Kelly.

=== Later life and death ===
Wall retired in 1987 and was appointed a Knight Bachelor in the 1987 Queen's Birthday Honours. After retiring from parliament he worked as a weekend duty doctor at Porirua Hospital. He died in 1992.

== Personal life ==
He married Uru Raupo Cameron in 1951, a nurse from Northland. They had two sons and three daughters. For recreational he participated in rugby (as both a player and referee) and climbing.

== Citations ==
New Zealand Parliament
Preceded by Henry May	Member of Parliament for Porirua; 1969–1987	Succeeded by Graham Kelly
Political offices
Preceded by Sir Basil Arthur	Speaker of the New Zealand House of Representatives; 1985–1987	Succeeded by Kerry Burke
