= Dudley Ward (judge) =

Judge, Member of Parliament

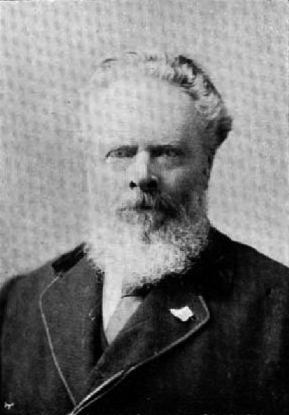
- Judge Ward

Personal details
- Born: Charles Dudley Robert Ward; 9 July 1827 at sea (Atlantic Ocean)
- Died: 30 August 1913 (aged 86) Maori Hill, Dunedin, New Zealand
- Spouses: Anne Ward (m. 1850; died 1896) Thorpe Talbot (m. 1902)
- Relations: Robert Plumer Ward (grandfather); Sir John Swinburne, 6th Baronet (grandfather); William Ward (cousin); William George Ward (cousin)
- Parent: Henry George Ward

Charles Dudley Robert Ward (9 July 1827 – 30 August 1913), known as Dudley Ward, was a New Zealand judge and a Member of Parliament. His first wife, Anne Ward, was a prominent suffragist and served as the first president of the New Zealand Women's Christian Temperance Union. His second wife, Frances Ellen "Thorpe" Talbot Ward, was a journalist and travel writer who also supported women's suffrage.

== Family and education ==
Ward was born at sea on board HMS Primrose in the Atlantic Ocean on 9 July 1827. He was the eldest son of diplomat, politician, and later governor of Ceylon, Sir Sir Henry George Ward GCMG and Emily Swinburne, and a cousin of William Ward and William George Ward. He was educated at Rugby School and at Wadham College, Oxford (though not being awarded a degree) and completed his legal education at the Inner Temple being called to the Bar in 1853. His grandfathers were Robert Plumer Ward and Sir John Swinburne, 6th Baronet.

== A career in New Zealand ==
New Zealand Parliament
Years	Term	Electorate	Party
1855–1858	2nd	Wellington Country	Independent

Ward was married on 26 January 1850, at Rotherhithe, to Anne Titboald, who was born in Exeter. After his admission to the bar, the Wards set out for New Zealand, arriving on 29 September 1854 in Wellington on the Cordelia. The following year, he successfully stood for election to the lower house of the 2nd New Zealand Parliament representing the Wellington Country electorate from 15 November 1855. Ward resigned on 22 March 1858 before the end of the term. He did not serve in any subsequent Parliaments.

== Judiciary ==
On 1 June 1857, 18 months after his election to Parliament, Ward was appointed chairman of the Courts of Sessions of the Peace for the Province of Wellington and presiding judge of the Magistrate's Courts for Hawke's Bay, Wairarapa and Wanganui. On 1 January 1864, he was given a two-year appointment as Resident Magistrate at Wellington, the capital. The remainder of his career was appointments as District Judge for a series of individual provinces until, after more than 49 years service, his retirement in March 1906, aged almost 79, on a pension of £800 per annum.

=== Supreme Court ===
Ward was appointed Acting Supreme Court Judge on four occasions: September 1867 Dunedin; September 1886 Auckland; September 1887 Christchurch; March 1894 Dunedin again.

He had been involved in the parliamentary Ward-Chapman enquiry of 1874–75 after he laid certain charges of gross partiality against Justice Chapman of the Supreme Court. Chapman retired in 1875.

Ward declined a permanent appointment on the Supreme Court bench in June 1896, the offer being received just after the death of his wife, and he declined an Acting Supreme Court judgeship in the following year.

== Private life and second wife ==
Ward was a tall man of strong build. He stood 6 feet 6 inches (1.98 m) tall and weighed 17 stone (110 kg). In the 1880s and 1890s, the Wards had a house in the Christchurch suburb of Burwood; it was said that they "scarcely spoke to each other". Later, they had a house in Park Terrace in the Christchurch Central City. He is rumoured to have had several mistresses and Judge Chapman wrote about him:

a man of infamous private character, and has not the decency to conceal it

Ward's first wife Anne Ward died in Christchurch on 31 May 1896 and was buried at Burwood Cemetery.

Ward bought a house in the Dunedin suburb of Maori Hill for one of his mistresses, the writer Frances Ellen Talbot, better known under her pseudonym Thorpe Talbot (1851–1923). The house was held in the name of a farmer who Ward knew, and within a month of his wife's death, Ward's name was added to the title. On 6 January 1902, Ward and Talbot were married at that house, and Ward lived in it for the rest of his life.

== Death ==
Dudley Ward died at his residence in Dunedin on 30 August 1913 aged 86. There were no children from either marriage. His widow sent his body to Christchurch to be buried next to his first wife. The gravestone reads:

After long years of trial and sorrow cometh Charles Dudley Robert Ward to lay his weary heart beside her whom he held dearest of all

His second wife was removed from her home after her husband's death and became impoverished. She died in Dunedin 1923.

New Zealand Parliament
Preceded by William Barnard Rhodes	Member of Parliament for Wellington Country; 1855–1858	Succeeded by Alfred Brandon
