= Alfred Brandon (politician) =

New Zealand politician

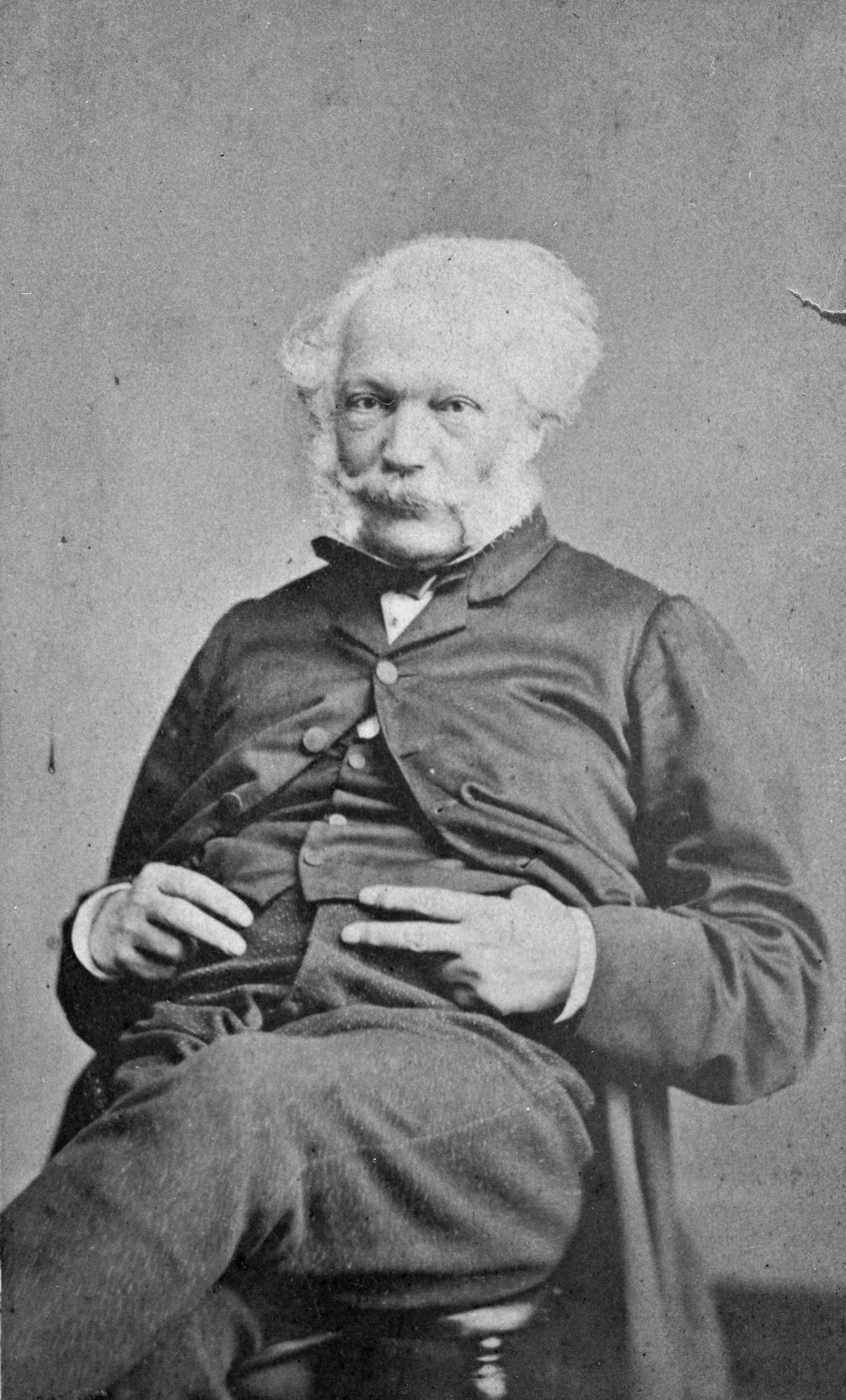
- Alfred de Bathe Brandon in ca 1860s

Member of the New Zealand Parliament for Wellington Country
- In office 29 July 1858 – 5 November 1860
- Preceded by: Dudley Ward
- Succeeded by: In abeyance
- In office 17 Jan 1871 – 15 August 1881
- Preceded by: In abeyance
- Succeeded by: Electorate abolished
- In office 20 December 1860 – 30 December 1870
- Preceded by: New constituency
- Succeeded by: In abeyance (next held by Henry May)

Personal details
- Born: 1809 London
- Died: 22 September 1886 (aged 76–77) Hobson Street, Wellington
- Relations: Alfred Brandon (son); Alfred Brandon (grandson)

Alfred de Bathe Brandon (1809 – 22 September 1886) was a 19th-century New Zealand politician.

== Early life ==
Brandon was born in London in 1809; his father was Henry Brandon. He was educated as a lawyer. He took an interest in Edward Gibbon Wakefield's ideas on colonisation and came to Wellington, New Zealand, in 1840 on the London as a cabin passenger.

== Political career ==
New Zealand Parliament
Years	Term	Electorate	Party
1858–1860	2nd	Wellington Country	Independent
1860–1866	3rd	Porirua	Independent
1866–1870	4th	Porirua	Independent
1871–1875	5th	Wellington Country	Independent
1875–1879	6th	Wellington Country	Independent
1879–1881	7th	Wellington Country	Independent

Brandon was elected to the Wellington Provincial Council in its first election in 1853. He represented the Wellington Country electorate until 1865, and then the Porirua electorate until the abolition of the provincial governments in October 1876. He served on various Executive Councils (comparable to a cabinet) between 1857 and 1871. He was Provincial Solicitor during the superintendency of Isaac Featherston.

He represented the Wellington Country electorate in Parliament from 1858 to 1860, then the Porirua electorate from 1860 to 1870, then the Wellington Country electorate again from 1871. In 1871, Brandon was challenged by Edward Thomas Gillon. Whilst there was criticism of Brandon not having had a good connection to his electorate, Brandon won with a solid majority. The next election in 1875 was contested by Gillon, Brandon, and J. H. Wallace. Brandon was again successful and received 208 votes versus 141 for Gillon, with Wallace a distant last. Brandon won the 1879 election and at the end of the parliamentary term in 1881, he retired from politics.

He was one of the staunch provincialists (i.e. he was opposed to the abolition of the provinces).

He was called to the Legislative Council on 5 June 1883 and served until his death.

== Outside parliament ==
Brandon was Crown Prosecutor in Wellington. He was regarded as an expert in conveyancing and in legal drafting. He was on the board of governors of Wellington College. He was director of two insurance companies (Colonial Insurance Co. and Australian Mutual Provident Society). He was president of the Wellington Law Society for a time.

== Family and death ==
His first marriage was to Constance Mary Ann Brandon (née Brandon); they married in London in 1840. His wife died in December 1842 and was buried at the original St Paul's Church, located just behind the present Beehive. She left him an infant son, Eustace Brandon, who became a notable artist.

His second marriage was to Lucy Poole in 1854, and they were to have three sons and four daughters. Brandon died in Wellington on 22 September 1886. His son Alfred Brandon was Mayor of Wellington. His grandson, Alfred Brandon, was a lawyer and military aviator.

Brandon's house near Bulls, Brandon Hall Homestead, was registered by the New Zealand Historic Places Trust (now Heritage New Zealand) in 2005 as a Category II heritage structure. This registration was done with little involvement of the current property owners.

Brandon Street in Wellington Central is named for him.

== Notes ==
New Zealand Parliament
Preceded by Dudley Ward	Member of Parliament for Wellington Country; 1858–1860; 1871–1881	In abeyance Title next held by himself
In abeyance Title last held by himself	Member of Parliament for Wellington Country; 1858–1860; 1871–1881	Constituency abolished
New constituency	Member of Parliament for Porirua; 1860–1870	In abeyance Title next held by Henry May
