= Alfred Brandon (RAF officer) =

Lawyer and WWI military aviator

Alfred de Bathe Brandon
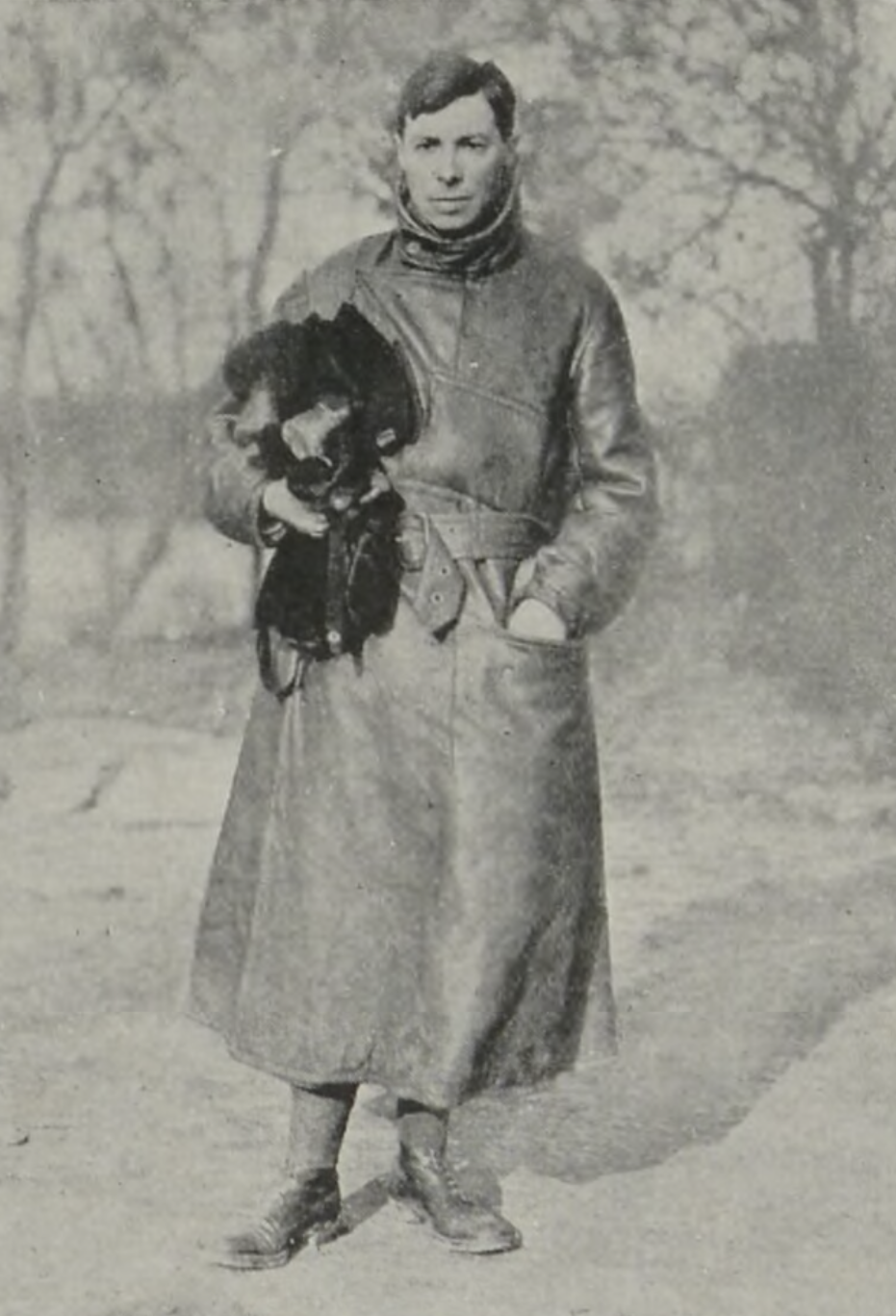
- Born: 21 June 1883; Wellington, New Zealand
- Died: 19 June 1974 (aged 90); Upper Hutt, New Zealand
- Military career
- Allegiance: United Kingdom
- Branch: Royal Flying Corps; Royal Air Force
- Service years: 1915–1919
- Rank: Major
- Units: No. 19 Reserve Aeroplane Squadron RFC; No. 39 (Home Defence) Squadron RFC
- Commands: No. 50 Squadron
- Conflicts: World War I
- Awards: Distinguished Service Order; Military Cross
- Other work: Lawyer

Alfred de Bathe (Bath) Brandon DSO MC (21 July 1883 – 19 June 1974) was a New Zealand lawyer and military aviator who served in the First World War, and was credited with the destruction of two Zeppelin airships.

== Biography ==
Brandon was born in Wellington, New Zealand, on 21 July 1883. He was the son of the Mayor of Wellington, Alfred Brandon and Louisa Kebbell. He was the grandson of the Member of the House of Representatives (MHR), also called Alfred Brandon. He was educated at Wellington College and Canterbury College, Christchurch, before going to England to study law at Trinity Hall, Cambridge in 1902.

Brandon was practising law for his father's company 'Brandon, Hislop and Johnston' in Wellington when the war broke out in August 1914. He gave up his job and resigned his commission in the 5th (Wellington) Regiment in order to travel to England, where he learned to fly at the Hall Flying School at Hendon at his own expense, gaining Royal Aero Club Aviator's Certificate No. 1905 on 17 October 1915. He joined the Royal Flying Corps, receiving a commission as a probationary second lieutenant on 8 December 1915, which was confirmed on 8 March 1916.

On 1 April 1916, flying a B.E.2e fighter of No. 19 Reserve Aeroplane Squadron, he succeeded in attacking Zeppelin L 15 using Ranken darts. It subsequently came down in the sea, and although the airship had already been damaged by anti-aircraft fire, his efforts won him the Military Cross. It was the first Zeppelin brought down over England.

On the night of 23 September 1916 flying a B.E.2e fighter he attacked Zeppelin L 33, helping to bring the airship down in a field.

On 4 October 1916 he was appointed a Companion of the Distinguished Service Order, "in recognition of his gallantry and distinguished service in connection with the successful attack on Enemy Airships", following the shooting down of Zeppelin L 33 by No. 39 (Home Defence) Squadron.

During 1917–1918 he was the commanding officer of 50 Squadron, and was promoted to major in January 1918.

Brandon returned to New Zealand in early 1919 and assisted in the preparation of a report on New Zealand air defences, before returning to join his family's law practice, Brandon, Ward, Hislop and Powles.

== Personal life ==
Brandon married Ada Mabel Perry at the Cathedral Church of St Paul, Wellington, on 2 January 1942; he was 58, she 38. They had one child, Peter de Bathe Brandon. Alfred Brandon died in Upper Hutt on 19 June 1974, survived by his wife.
