= Porirua (electorate) =

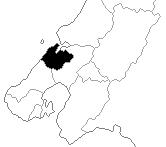
Porirua electorate boundaries between 1993 and 1996

Porirua was a New Zealand parliamentary electorate in the North Island. It existed during two periods; from 1860 to 1870, and then from 1963 to 1996.

== Population centres ==
The former Porirua electorate was based in Porirua City, about 20 km north of Wellington. When the electorate became the Onepoto and Pāuatahanui General Wards, the estimated population of Porirua was 47,300.

== History ==
The electorate was first created in 1860 for the term of the 3rd New Zealand Parliament. It existed until the end of the 4th Parliament in 1870. Alfred Brandon was the representative during that period.

The electorate was recreated in 1963 for the 34th Parliament. In 1996 with MMP, the electorate was replaced by the new Mana electorate. The holder of Porirua, Graham Kelly chose to become a list MP in 2002.

From 1963 to 1996, the electorate was held by three Labour Party representatives: Henry May, Gerry Wall, and Graham Kelly.

=== Members of Parliament ===
Key

Independent Labour

Election	Winner
1860 election	Alfred Brandon
1866 election	Alfred Brandon
(electorate abolished, 1870–1963)
1963 election	Henry May
1966 election	Henry May
1969 election	Gerry Wall
1972 election	Gerry Wall
1975 election	Gerry Wall
1978 election	Gerry Wall
1981 election	Gerry Wall
1984 election	Gerry Wall
1987 election	Graham Kelly
1990 election	Graham Kelly
1993 election	Graham Kelly
(Electorate abolished in 1996; see Mana)

== Election results ==
=== 1993 election ===
1993 general election: Porirua
Party	Candidate	Votes	%	±%
Labour	Graham Kelly	9,163	57.46	+15.72
National	Lagi Sipeli	2,450	15.36	
Alliance	Kiwa Mitchell	2,309	14.48	
NZ First	Rita Magson	1,261	7.90	
Christian Heritage	Bill O'Donnell	522	3.27	
McGillicuddy Serious	Grant Prankerd	239	1.49	
Majority		6,713	42.10	+24.31
Turnout		15,944	81.38	+0.46
Registered electors		19,592		

=== 1990 election ===
1990 general election: Porirua
Party	Candidate	Votes	%	±%
Labour	Graham Kelly	8,102	41.74	−8.72
National	Philip Faulkner	4,649	23.95	
Green	David Green	1,441	7.42	
NewLabour	L Harley	1,193	6.14	
McGillicuddy Serious	Grant Prankerd	183	0.94	
Democrats	Ron England	115	0.59	−3.24
Communist League	Carmen Bain	23	0.11	
Majority		3,453	17.79	−4.44
Turnout		15,706	80.92	−1.66
Registered electors		19,407		

=== 1987 election ===
1987 general election: Porirua
Party	Candidate	Votes	%	±%
Labour	Graham Kelly	8,015	50.46	
National	Arthur Leonard Gadsby	4,484	28.23	+3.83
Independent Labour	Michael Dermot Duncan	2,004	12.61	
Democrats	Ron England	609	3.83	
Independent	Mikele Kelekolio	390	2.45	
Mana Motuhake	Mark Metekingi	225	1.41	+0.72
Socialist Action	Peter Raymond Bradley	154	0.96	
Majority		3,531	22.23	
Turnout		15,881	82.58	−7.47
Registered electors		19,229		

=== 1984 election ===
1984 general election: Porirua
Party	Candidate	Votes	%	±%
Labour	Gerry Wall	9,801	54.56	+7.79
National	Arthur Leonard Gadsby	4,383	24.40	
NZ Party	Alison Murrie	2,700	15.03	
Social Credit	H W Underwood	863	4.80	
Mana Motuhake	Mark Metekingi	125	0.69	+0.20
Socialist Action	Ken Stanton	90	0.50	
Majority		5,418	30.16	+8.79
Turnout		17,962	90.05	+1.85
Registered electors		19,945		

=== 1981 election ===
1981 general election: Porirua
Party	Candidate	Votes	%	±%
Labour	Gerry Wall	7,965	46.77	−1.35
Social Credit	Estelle Brittain	4,326	25.40	
National	Asalemo Pesamino	3,465	20.34	
Independent Labour	Geoff Walpole	1,136	6.67	
Independent	Mark Metekingi	84	0.49	
Socialist Unity	John Van der Ven	52	0.30	
Majority		3,639	21.37	−0.24
Turnout		17,028	88.20	−20.79
Registered electors		19,305		

=== 1978 election ===
1978 general election: Porirua
Party	Candidate	Votes	%	±%
Labour	Gerry Wall	8,142	48.12	+0.47
National	Alan Perry	4,485	26.51	
Social Credit	Estelle Brittain	2,177	12.86	
Values	Helen Smith	2,043	12.07	−1.38
Socialist Unity	Ken Douglas	70	0.41	+0.13
Majority		3,657	21.61	+7.61
Turnout		16,917	67.41	−13.87
Registered electors		25,093		

=== 1975 election ===
1975 general election: Porirua
Party	Candidate	Votes	%	±%
Labour	Gerry Wall	7,692	47.55	−12.02
National	Ross Doughty	5,427	33.55	+4.71
Values	Helen Smith	2,176	13.45	+6.11
Social Credit	Mark Pownall	834	5.15	
Socialist Unity	Ken Douglas	46	0.28	−0.19
Majority		2,265	14.00	−16.73
Turnout		16,175	81.28	−6.08
Registered electors		19,900		

=== 1972 election ===
1972 general election: Porirua
Party	Candidate	Votes	%	±%
Labour	Gerry Wall	8,528	59.57	+4.60
National	Ross Doughty	4,129	28.84	
Values	Helen Smith	1,051	7.34	
Social Credit	Gavin Neville Green	487	3.40	
Socialist Unity	Ken Douglas	68	0.47	
New Democratic	Edward Donald Prangley	52	0.36	
Majority		4,399	30.73	+13.84
Turnout		14,315	87.36	−2.61
Registered electors		16,385		

=== 1969 election ===
1969 general election: Porirua
Party	Candidate	Votes	%	±%
Labour	Gerry Wall	8,927	54.97	
National	Paul William Mitchell	6,183	38.07	
Social Credit	John Vincent	891	5.48	
Communist	Ken Stanton	236	1.45	
Majority		2,744	16.89	+4.20
Turnout		16,237	89.97	+4.11
Registered electors		18,046		

=== 1966 election ===
1966 general election: Porirua
Party	Candidate	Votes	%	±%
Labour	Henry May	7,807	51.42	−6.88
National	Rick Stevenson	5,879	38.72	
Social Credit	R O Blackwell	1,335	8.79	
Communist	Jack Manson	161	1.06	
Majority		1,928	12.69	−9.95
Turnout		15,182	85.86	−4.84
Registered electors		17,682		

=== 1963 election ===
1963 general election: Porirua
Party	Candidate	Votes	%	±%
Labour	Henry May	8,096	58.00	
National	Joseph W. Miller	4,935	35.35	
Social Credit	Daniel Trevor Hart	767	5.49	
Communist	Tommy Heptinstall	159	1.13	
Majority		3,161	22.64	
Turnout		13,957	90.70	
Registered electors		15,387		
