= Charles Luke (politician) =

New Zealand politician and company director

Sir Charles Luke CStJ JP
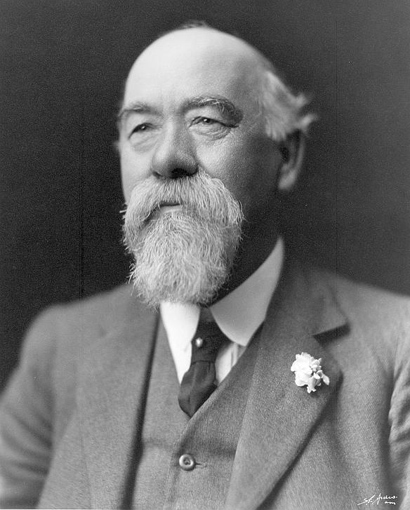

13th Mayor of Wellington
- In office 20 December 1894 – 19 December 1895
- Preceded by: Alfred Brandon
- Succeeded by: George Fisher

Member of the New Zealand Legislative Council
- In office 22 January 1907 – 21 January 1914
- Appointed by: Sir Joseph Ward

Personal details
- Born: Charles Manley Luke; 4 February 1857 St Just in Penwith, Cornwall, England
- Died: 19 April 1941 (aged 84) Wellington, New Zealand
- Party: Liberal
- Spouse: Annie Pinny (m. 1880; died 1928)
- Relations: John Luke (brother); Lawrence Birks (son-in-law)
- Children: 6

Sir Charles Manley Luke CStJ JP (4 February 1857 – 19 April 1941) was a New Zealand politician and company director. He served as mayor of Wellington in 1895. His brother, Sir John Luke, was later mayor of Wellington from 1913 to 1921.

== Biography ==
=== Early life and career ===
Born at St Just in Penwith, near Penzance, Cornwall, England, Luke came to New Zealand with his parents in July 1874. He married and had four sons and two daughters. His elder daughter Edith Mabel Luke (10 April 1880 – 21 July 1923) married electrical engineer Lawrence Birks on 29 April 1909. They had four children.

He was a director of S Luke and Sons Limited up until his retirement in 1913. Luke and Sons were ship builders and engineers. The company erected a number of hydraulic cranes on the Wellington wharfs. The company was located on the Te Aro foreshore and built the steamships Matai and Weka. It also built equipment for the Cape Palliser lighthouse as well as other lighthouses around the country. S Luke and Sons was merged into Jas J Niven & Co. He was chairman of the Wellington Industrial Association from 1888 to 1889. Luke was one of those responsible for establishing the Associated Chambers of Commerce.

Luke was a member of the YMCA for over 40 years and actively involved in church affairs. Luke was three times President of the Primitive Methodist Church, Vice President of the United Methodist Church, and New Zealand representative at the 1905 Scarborough Methodist Conference. He was a foundation member of the New Zealand Alliance (for the Abolition of the Liquor Traffic).

=== Political career ===
From 1885 he was a trustee of the Wellington Hospital for 50 years including chairman of its board for 14 years. In 1894 he was elected Mayor of Wellington. At the following election he was defeated by George Fisher. He was also president of the Wellington Chamber of Commerce for six years, a member of the Wellington Education Board, the Technical School Board and Wellington College Board of Governors. From 1894 to 1895 he was a member of the Wellington Harbour Board.

He served on numerous committees. In 1901 the Royal New Zealand Federation Commission was set up to consider Federation between New Zealand and the Australia states. Luke was appointed as a member and toured Australia to determine if the idea was worthwhile. After three months investigation and deliberation the commission dismissed the idea. During the First World War he was elected a member of the Patriotic Association, vice president of the War Relief Association, and a member of the War Funds Council for 20 years holding the role of chairman of the executive for a time. He was also on the board of Flock House which provided assistance to widows and dependents of sailors of the British Navy and Merchant Marine who had lost their lives during the war.

At the 1899 general election he stood unsuccessfully in the Wellington electorate as a Liberal Party candidate. At the 1902 general election he stood for the seat of Newtown, but was again unsuccessful.

He served one term on the New Zealand Legislative Council (22 January 1907 – 21 January 1914).

=== Later life and death ===
In 1935, Luke was awarded the King George V Silver Jubilee Medal. In the 1939 New Year Honours, he was appointed a Knight Bachelor, for public services. In 1940 he was appointed a Commander of the Order of St John.

Luke died at the residence of his younger daughter, Grace Winifred Cunningham (1886–1976), in Kelburn on 19 April 1941, and his ashes were buried in Karori Cemetery.

== Notes ==
Political offices
Preceded by Alfred Brandon	Mayor of Wellington; 1894-1895	Succeeded by George Fisher
Preceded by Fred Castle	Chair of Wellington Hospital Board; 1925–1930	Succeeded by Fred Castle
