= Alfred Brandon (mayor) =

New Zealand mayor (1854–1938)

Alfred de Bathe Brandon
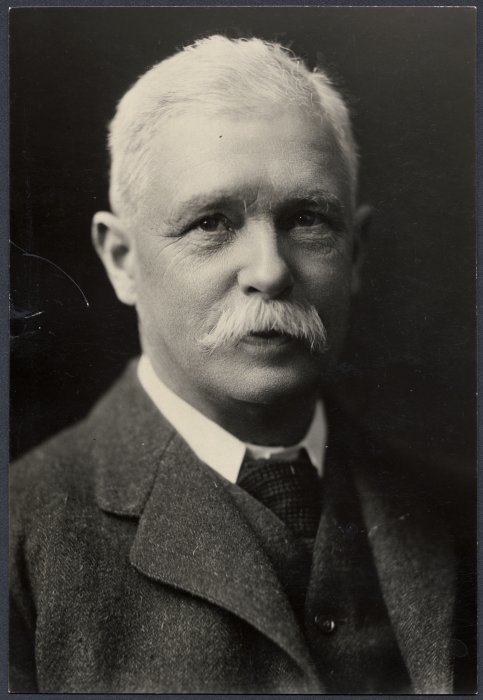

12th Mayor of Wellington
- In office 1894–1894
- Preceded by: Francis Bell
- Succeeded by: Charles Luke

Personal details
- Born: 12 December 1854 Wellington, New Zealand
- Died: 30 July 1938 (aged 83) Wellington, New Zealand
- Party: Liberal

Alfred de Bathe Brandon (12 December 1854 – 30 July 1938) was the Mayor of Wellington, New Zealand in 1894.

== Family ==
Brandon was the son of Member of Parliament Alfred Brandon. He married Louisa Kebbell, the second daughter of Thomas Kebbell, an early Wellington pioneer, in 1879. They had three sons and three daughters.

== Education and early legal career ==
Brandon was one of the first eight boys who enrolled at Wellington College when it first opened. In 1872 he was granted one of the first scholarships to the University of New Zealand. In 1875, he attended Trinity Hall, Cambridge, England and obtained a Bachelor of Arts in 1878. Brandon was admitted to the bar at Middle Temple. On his return to New Zealand he was admitted as a barrister and solicitor to the Supreme Court.

Brandon joined his father's law firm eventually becoming a senior partner in the law firm Brandon, Ward, Hislop, and Powles. He also became President of the Wellington District Law Society.

== Later career ==
In August 1888 Brandon was appointed a director of the Australian Mutual Provident Society. He became its deputy chairman in May 1903 and chairman in 1918. A position he held until he retired on 31 May 1934. His father had been a director of the society from 1871 to 1886.

Brandon was also a long serving member of the Wellington Chamber of Commerce having joined in 1872. He was on its executive for 11 years and President in 1882, 1897 and 1898. In April 1929 he was elected a life member. Brandon was also a board member of the Gear Meat Preserving and Freezing Company until he retired in September 1935 due to ill health.

In September 1886 he was elected as a city councillor for the Thorndon Ward. A position he held until January 1891. In 1894 he was mayor of Wellington and a member of the Wellington Harbour Board.

== Private life and death ==
His son of the same name, Alfred de Bathe Brandon, was a notable lawyer and aviator.

Brandon died in Wellington on 30 July 1938.

Political offices
Preceded by Francis Bell	Mayor of Wellington; 1894	Succeeded by Charles Luke
