= Marmaduke Dixon =

Marmaduke Dixon may refer to:

- Marmaduke Dixon (settler) (1828–1895), New Zealand farmer and local politician
- Marmaduke Dixon (mountaineer) (1862–1918), New Zealand farmer and mountaineer
