= Harris Scientific Reserve =

Scientific reserve near Ashburton, New Zealand

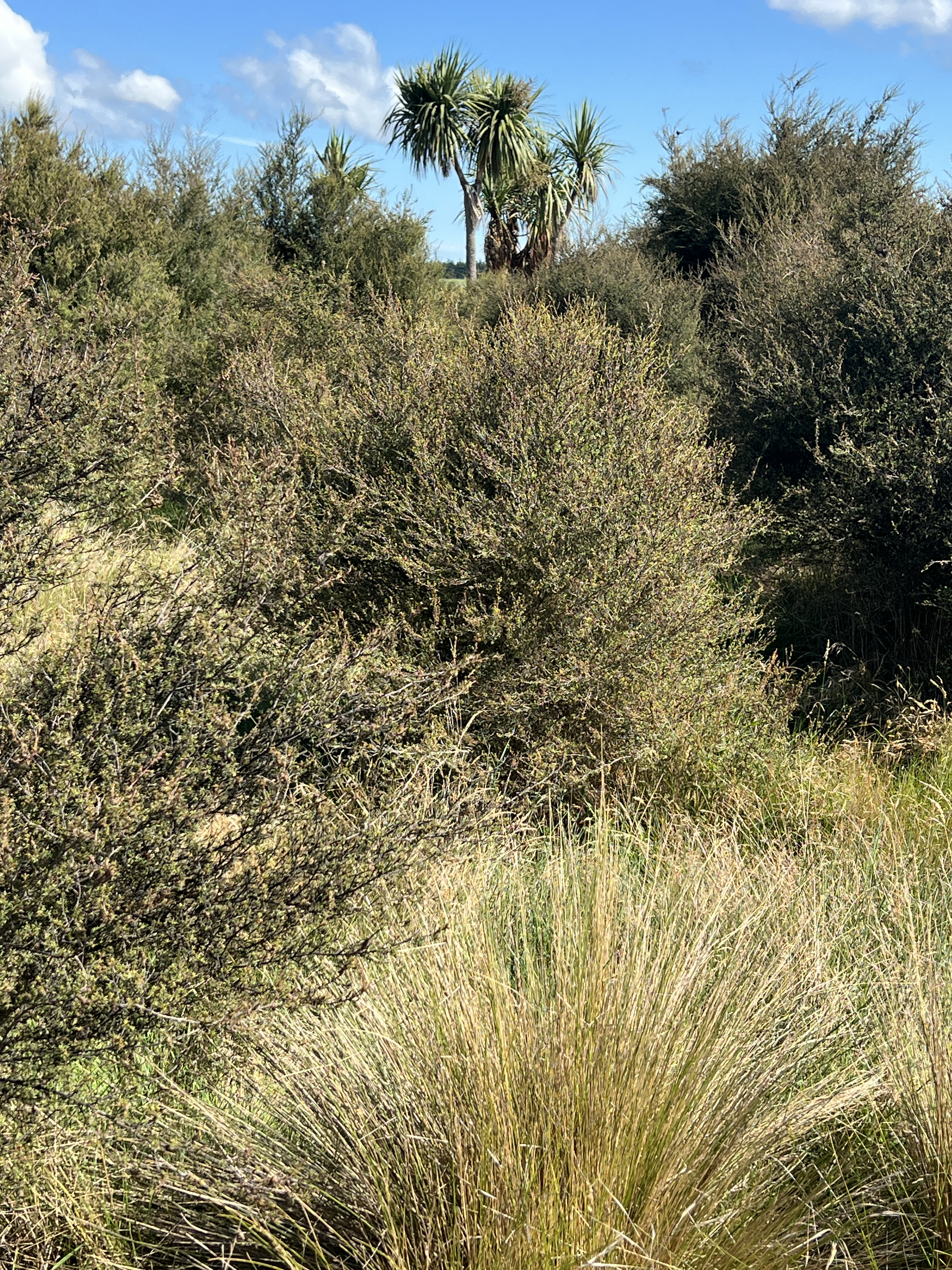
- Interactive map of Harris Scientific Reserve
- Location: Canterbury Plains
- Nearest town: Ashburton
- Coordinates: 43°56′10″S 171°36′14″E
- Area: 11.5 hectares (28 acres)
- Elevation: 110 m (360.89 ft)
- Created: 2010
- Etymology: After the former landowners
- Owner: Ashburton District Council
- Operator: Ashburton Community Conservation Trust
- Species: Kunzea ericoides, Craspedia diversicolor, Clematis marata

Harris Scientific Reserve, 12 km from the town of Ashburton, New Zealand, preserves some of the last remaining kānuka (Kunzea serotina) dryland forest on the Canterbury Plains. The 11.5 ha reserve is owned by the Ashburton District Council and maintained by the Ashburton Community Conservation Trust, with an active programme of volunteer planting.

== History ==
In 1962 Arthur and Shirley Harris purchased 121.4 ha of dry pasture at Maronan, 12 km southwest of the town of Ashburton. About 40 acres (16 ha) beside Lovetts Road was partly covered with low kānuka (Kunzea serotina) forest, matagouri (Discaria toumatou), and other native dryland species—referred to at the time as "scrub". Locals would forage for firewood on the site, so in 1965 the Harrises requested the help of the council to flatten the scrub and dig up kānuka stumps with a road grader, arranging them in windrows for burning, as they began to turn it into pasture. They retained and fenced 2.4 ha of kānuka around the perimeter of one paddock as shelter for lambing ewes, about 300 m away from Lovetts Road. Notably the land was never ploughed, instead being lightly grazed by sheep.

In 1969 Christchurch botanist Brian Molloy conducted a botanical survey of the site, and discovered climbing the kānuka a small-leaved and small-flowered undescribed species of Clematis, later named Clematis marata; the Harrises had noted its perfume on warm spring days. Molloy persuaded the Harrises to have the kānuka remnant fenced inside and out and covenanted under the Queen Elizabeth II National Trust to protect it from development, which was done in 1983. Molloy noted at the time:

"This patch is the largest of several smaller remnants that occur on farmland and roadside verges in this district ... Together they represent the last survivors of an extensive area of scrub mapped for this district between 1858 and 1873 ... The Lovetts Rd scrub, and the small kanuka scientific reserve at Eyrewell, are virtually all that remains of a vegetation type that once covered 500,000 acres or 200,000 hectares on the Canterbury Plains."

When the Harrises retired in 1995 the Ashburton District Council purchased the site, intending to use it as a landfill but realising it was not fit for purpose. In 2006 after a site visit Forest & Bird noted the poor condition of the covenant and suggested to the Council that it be expanded by 8.6 ha, encompassing the paddock between the kānuka remnant and Lovetts Road, and that it be administered by a trust set up by the local branch of Forest & Bird. The Ashburton Community Conservation Trust (ACCT) was set up in 2010 and the reserve officially opened that year.

Volunteer revegetation by Forest & Bird began in 2007 with the propagation and planting of 120 kānuka seedlings, but there was poor establishment on the dry, exposed site. The first public planting day in 2008 attracted 250 people, who planted 1000 seedlings supplied by the Department of Conservation nursery at Motukarara. Over two days in the summer of 2009–2010 60 members of the public planted 1200 plants, including Coprosma, Melicytus, Muehlenbeckia, and more kānuka.

In 2011 the "Living Legends" initiative, to commemorate the Rugby World Cup, sponsored 17 sites around the country, which agreed to hold three annual planting days; Harris Reserve was one chosen. This paid for 6,000 more plants, fertiliser, and a watering system and pump. On the first Living Legends day on 4 September 2011, 300 volunteers planted 3000 more plants with the assistance of former All Black and local Jock Ross. Subsequent Living Legends days planted 2000 plants in 2012 and 1300 in 2013, revegetating 2 hectares; sponsorship continued until 2017. Former landowner Arthur Harris continued to assist with planting and spraying until his death in 2014 at the age of 87.

External videos
- Edith Smith speaking at the Reserve, 13 September 2019

The goal of the ACCT is to restore a drylands ecosystem using seedlings sourced only from the Canterbury Plains between the Rangitata and Rakaia Rivers, with many propagated at a plant nursery at Arowhenua Marae in Temuka and at the Ashburton District Council's own nursery in Ashburton Domain. A part-time caretaker was employed from 2014, and volunteers including school groups have continued to propagate, plant, weed, spray, and maintain the site. Part of the open field is still used by the Ashburton Model Aeroplane Club, and a water race was converted into a pond and wetland area. Planting efforts in the Reserve have been led by Forest & Bird's chairperson Edith Smith and Val Clemens, who was a founding member of the ACCT in 2007.

== Flora ==
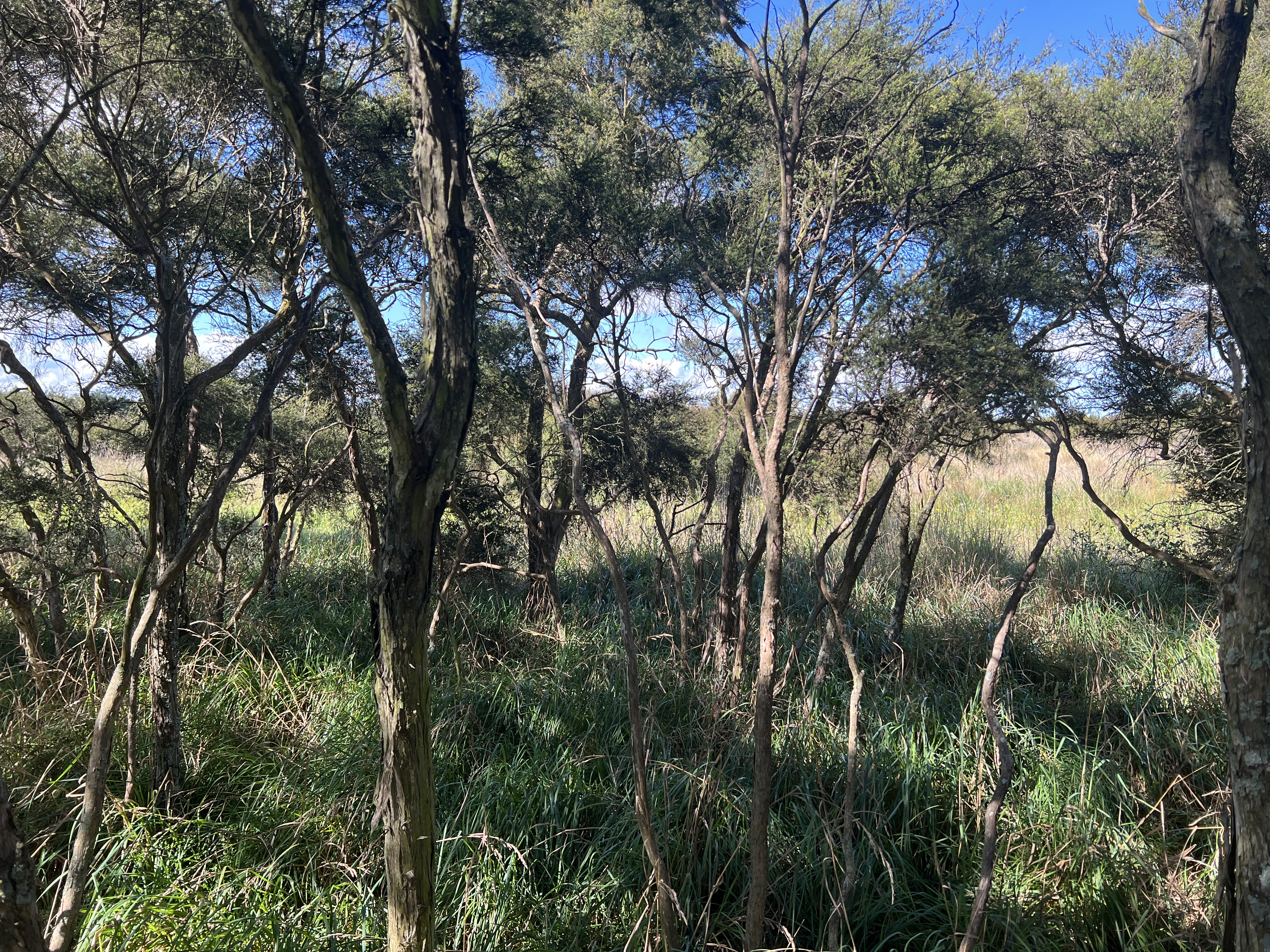
Remnant kānuka (Kunzea serotina)

The reserve is a remnant of the type of dry shrubland dominated by kānuka (Kunzea serotina) that was once common in mid-Canterbury on drought-prone shallow and stony Lismore and Chertsey soils; these few remaining patches are threatened by introduced herbivores (sheep, rabbits, hares, and possums), fire, modern agricultural fertiliser, irrigation, and increasing dairy farming conversion. This is the last remaining kānuka forest on the Ashburton plains, and one of the last stands in Canterbury. The kānuka on the Reserve have two forms, white-flowering with green leaves and pink-flowered with reddish leaves.

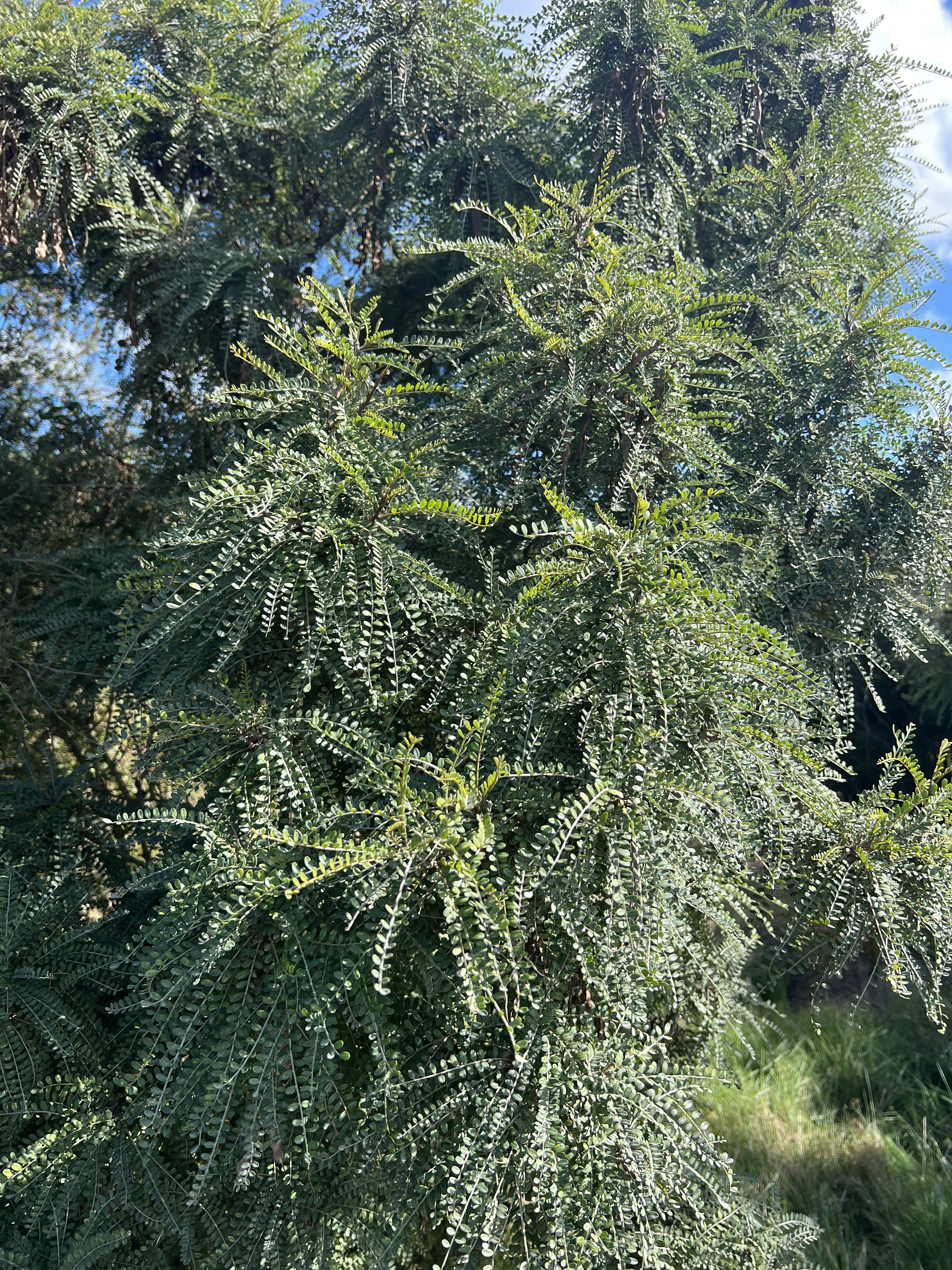
Kōwhai (Sophora microphylla)

Harris Scientific Reserve is one of the sites chosen for the propagation of the Wakanui woollyhead, Craspedia diversicolor, which was previously widely distributed in mid Canterbury but had been reduced to just two surviving plants at Wakanui Beach. Seedlings were propagated at Landcare Research in Lincoln with the assistance of Ilse Breitwiser, and planted out at Harris Reserve, a private reserve in Mayfield, and the Christchurch Botanic Gardens. Val Clemens received a NZPCN Plant Conservation award in 2018 and an Ashburton District Council's Community Honours Award in 2023 for her work with the reserve and helping save C. diversicolor.

A dozen plants of the original population of Clematis marata – all male – are still present in the remnant kānuka stand, and Coprosma intertexta has been propagated from the few remaining bushes on the Canterbury Plains and is spreading on the site. Kōwhai (Sophora microphylla) have been propagated from seed gathered in a nearby Rakaia River terrace, funded by a grant from Environment Canterbury, and several hectares have been planted in kōwhai savannah. Matagouri (Discaria toumatou), native broom (Carmichaelia australis), and creeping pohuehue (Muehlenbeckia axillaris) are also present. Pasture grass is being replaced by self-seeded Poa cita and Festuca novae-zelandiae.

Planting at Harris Scientific Reserve

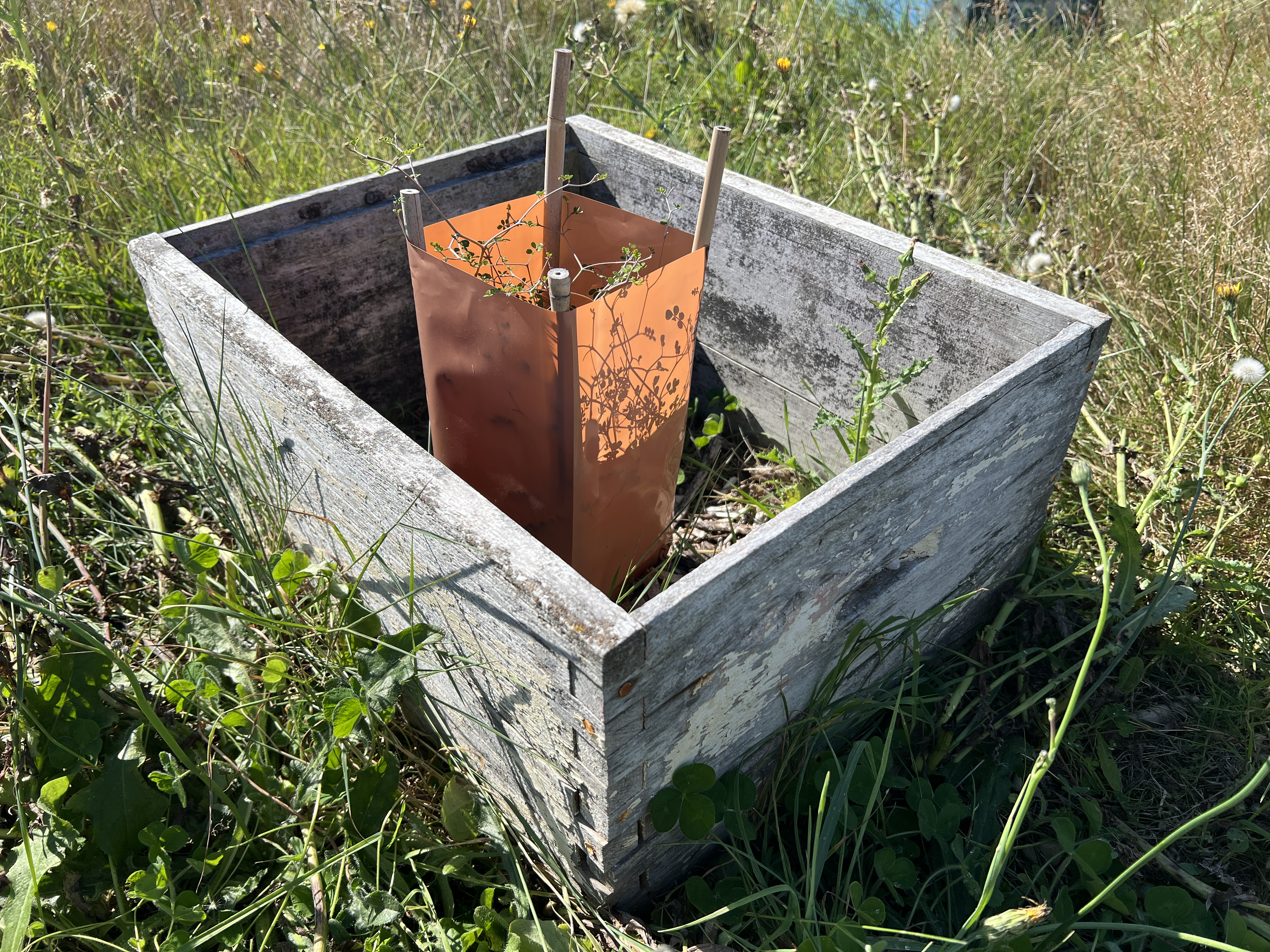

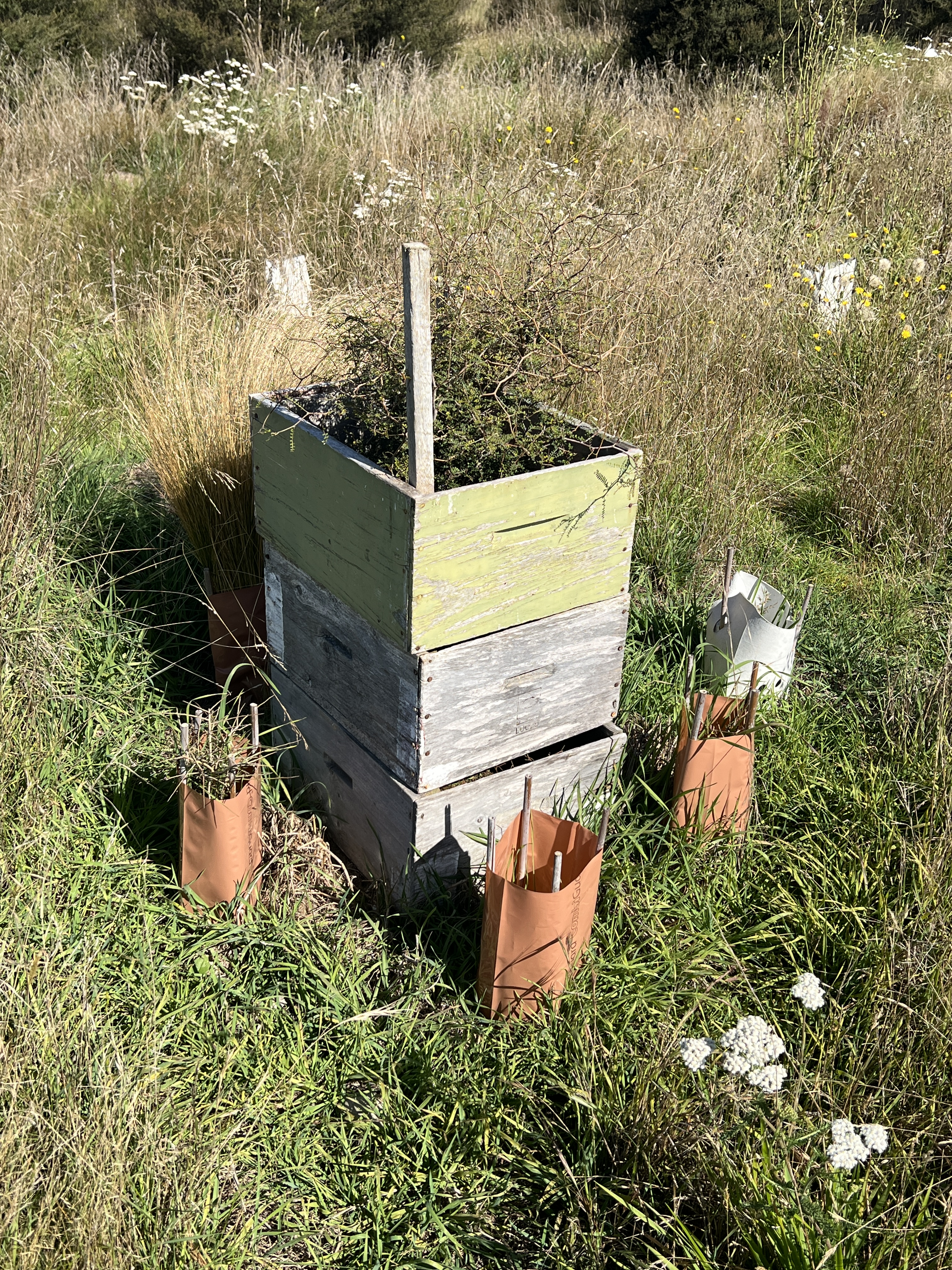

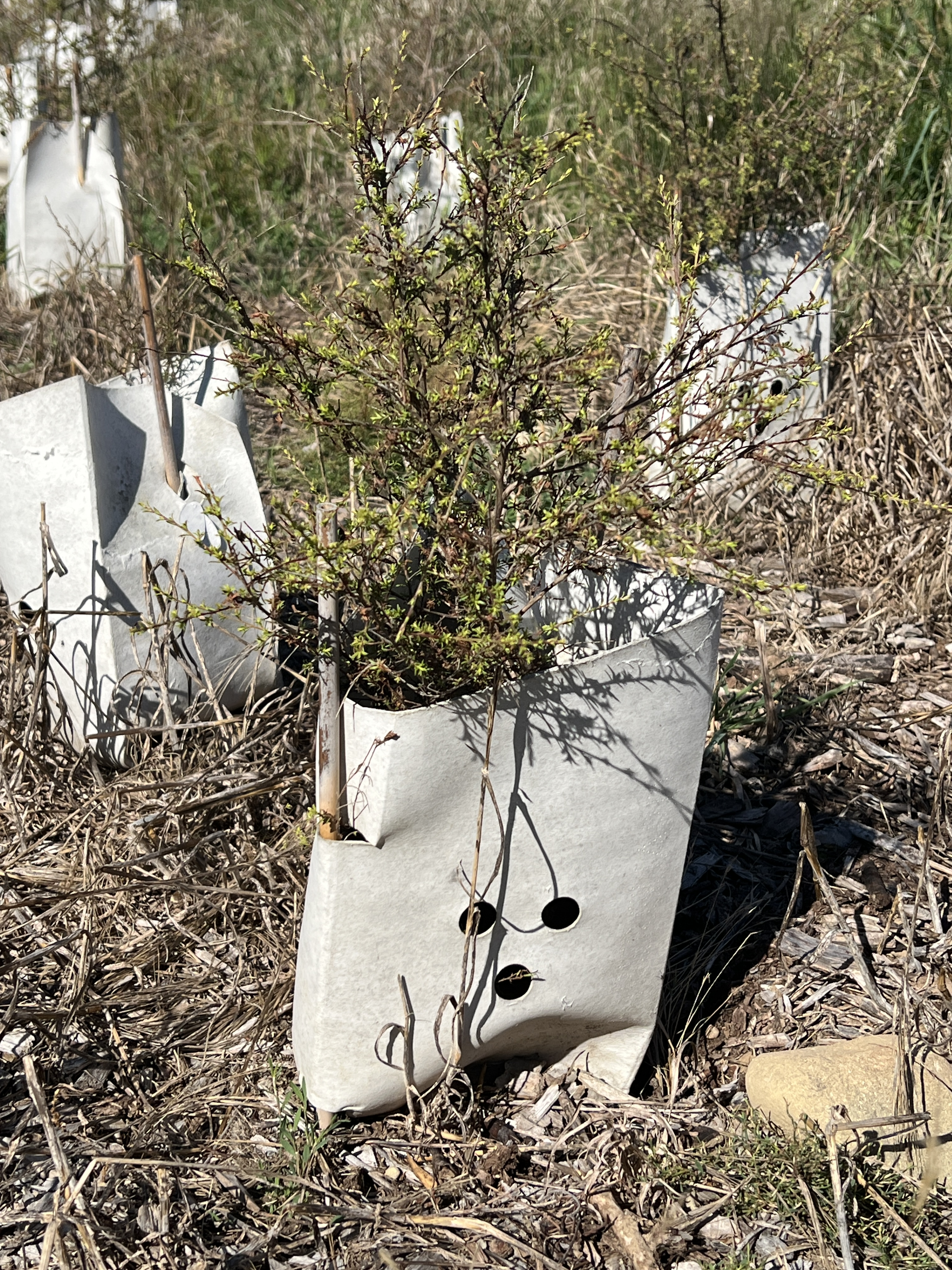

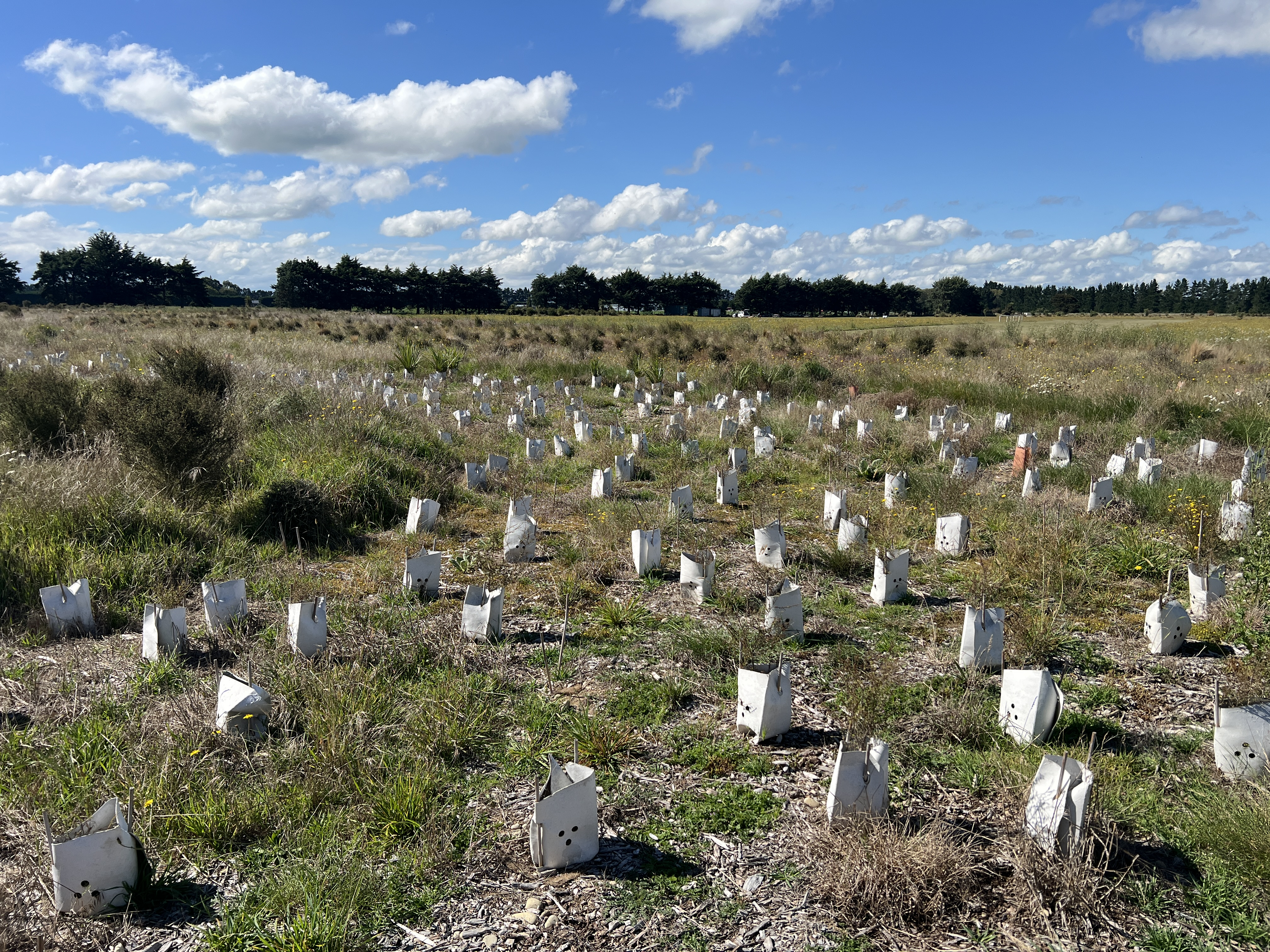

== See also ==
- Conservation in New Zealand
- Ashburton District
