= Rosa Spencer Bower =

New Zealand artist (1865–1960)

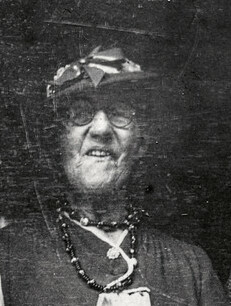
- Rosa Spencer Bower, c. 1930
- Born: Agnes Rosa Marion Dixon; 1865; Eyrewell, Canterbury, New Zealand
- Died: 1960 (aged 94–95); Christchurch, New Zealand
- Education: Canterbury College School of Art, Slade School of Fine Art
- Known for: Watercolour painting
- Notable work: Works held in Museum of New Zealand Te Papa Tongarewa
- Movement: New Zealand Impressionism

Agnes Rosa Marion Spencer Bower (née Dixon; 1865–1960) was a New Zealand watercolour artist. Her work is included in the permanent collection of Museum of New Zealand Te Papa Tongarewa.

== Biography ==
Spencer Bower was the elder of two daughters of Marmaduke Dixon, a Canterbury landowner, and Eliza Agnes Wood. The couple married in England and moved to Dixon's Canterbury sheep station, Eyrewell, in 1860. An elder brother, also named Marmaduke Dixon, became prominent as a mountaineer. Spencer Bower was raised on the property and learnt drawing from her mother as a child. She first exhibited in 1888 at the annual exhibition of the Canterbury Society of Arts, and became a regular exhibitor until 1914; even while living in England, she sent artworks to Canterbury which were included in their exhibitions. She also exhibited with the Otago Art Society, the New Zealand Society of Fine Arts and at the New Zealand and South Seas Exhibition in Dunedin in 1899.

She became friends with the flower painter Margaret Stoddart and the pair travelled to the West Coast in 1896, painting and sketching as they travelled. In 1898 Spencer Bower enrolled at the Canterbury College School of Art. In 1901, she travelled to England on the same ship as Frances Hodgkins, the RMS Arcadia. Spencer Bower was accepted at the Slade School of Fine Art in London, and studied under Henry Tonks. She also travelled to Italy and took painting classes in Rome.

Settling in St Neots in Huntingdonshire, Spencer Bower gave drawing lessons, sold paintings and released a series of coloured postcards based on views she had painted. She also supported Christabel Pankhurst and Sylvia Pankhurst's suffrage movement. In 1914 she moved to Bournemouth. During World War I she regular visited convalescent soldiers at the nearby New Zealand General Hospital at Brockenhurst, and also invited groups of the soldiers to the family home for weekly afternoon teas. In 1920 Spencer Bower returned to New Zealand, settling in Fendalton, Christchurch.

Spencer Bower had poor health in older age and in 1949, her daughter Olivia returned to Christchurch to care for her until her death in 1960.

== Personal life ==
Spencer Bower married Anthony Spencer Bower in 1904; she was 38 years old and her husband was in his mid-50s. In 1905, she gave birth to twins: Olivia Spencer Bower, who became an artist, and Anthony Marmaduke Orme Spencer Bower.
