= Marmaduke (given name) =

Marmaduke is a masculine given name. It is attested in English and French starting in the 12th century (in French, Marmaduk(e); also as Maraduke; in Latin, Marmaducus). It may come from Old Irish máel 'bald, tonsured' + Old Irish Máedoc 'of Máedoc' (i.e. Saint Máedóc).

The name Melmidoc, found in the Domesday Book (11th century), may be a form of this name.

An early example in North America is Marmaduke Earle, born 1696.

It has long been most common in Yorkshire, especially around Thirsk. It is often abbreviated as Duke. A Welsh family used the feminine form Dukana.

== People with the given name ==
- Marmaduke Alington (1671–1749), British lawyer and Member of Parliament
- Marmaduke Barton (1865–1938), English pianist, composer and teacher
- Sir Marmaduke Beckwith (1687–c. 1780), 3rd baronet and County Clerk of Richmond County, Virginia
- Marmaduke Bethell (1876–1955), New Zealand local politician and community leader
- Marmaduke Constable (disambiguation)
- Marmaduke Conway (1885-1961), English organist
- Marmaduke Cradock (1660–1716), English painter of birds and other animals
- Marmaduke H. Dent (1849–1909), American soldier, lawyer, politician and judge
- Marmaduke Dixon (mountaineer) (1862–1918), New Zealand farmer and mountaineer
- Marmaduke Dixon (settler) (1828–1895), New Zealand farmer and local politician
- Marmaduke Dove (died c. 1866), American politician
- Marmaduke Furness, 1st Viscount Furness (1883–1940), British shipping magnate
- Marmaduke Grove (1878–1954), Chilean Air Force officer, politician and member of the Government Junta of the Socialist Republic of Chile in 1932
- Marmaduke Hussey, Baron Hussey of North Bradley (1923–2006), Chairman of the Board of Governors of the BBC
- Marmaduke Langdale, 1st Baron Langdale of Holme (c. 1598–1661), English landowner and Royalist military commander during the Wars of the Three Kingdoms
- Marmaduke Alexander Lawson (1840–1896), British botanist
- Marmaduke Lloyd (1585–c. 1651), Welsh lawyer, judge and landowner
- Marmaduke Lumley (died 1450), English Lord High Treasurer, Catholic Bishop of Carlisle and Bishop of Lincoln
- Marmaduke Matthews (1837–1913), English-Canadian painter
- Marmaduke Middleton (died 1593), English Anglican bishop
- Marmaduke Norfleet (1700–1774), plantation owner, justice of the peace and state legislator in colonial North Carolina
- Marmaduke Overend (c. 1730–1790), Welsh music theorist and organist
- Pat Pattle (1914–1941), South African Royal Air Force flying ace
- Marmaduke Pickthall (1875–1936), English Islamic scholar
- Marmaduke Swaim Robins (1827–1905), American teacher, lawyer and politician
- Marmaduke Roydon (1583–1646), English merchant-adventurer, colonial planter and Royalist officer in the First English Civil War
- Marmaduke Sheild (1858–1922), British surgeon
- Marmaduke Stone (1748–1834), English Jesuit priest
- Marmaduke Thweng, 1st Baron Thweng (fl. 1295–1314, English knight and captain during the Wars of Scottish Independence
- Marmaduke Tunstall (1743–1790), English ornithologist and collector
- Marmaduke Tyrwhitt (1533/4–1600), English Member of Parliament
- Marmaduke Van Swearingen, a white name once thought to be Native American war chief Blue Jacket (c. 1743–1810)
- Marmaduke Watson, 17th century English stage actor
- M. A. Wetherell (1883–1939), British–South African actor, screenwriter, producer, film director, big-game hunter and hoaxster
- Marmaduke Williams (1774–1850), U.S. congressman from North Carolina
- Marmaduke Wyvill (disambiguation)

== See also ==
- Marmaduke (disambiguation)
