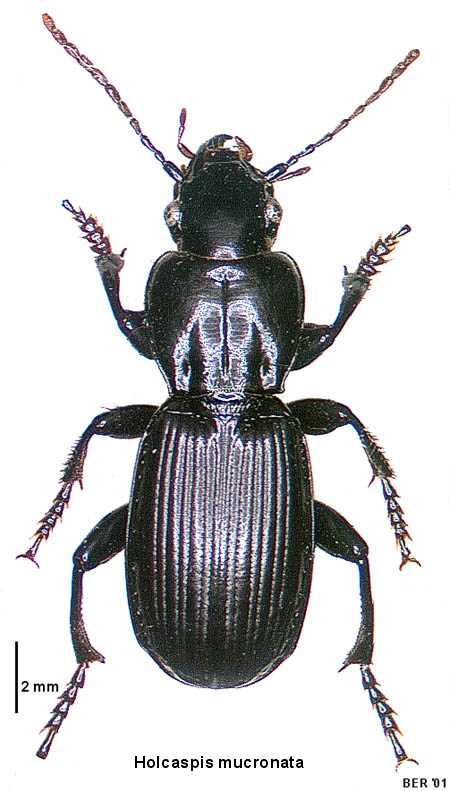

Scientific classification
- Domain: Eukaryota
- Kingdom: Animalia
- Phylum: Arthropoda
- Class: Insecta
- Order: Coleoptera
- Suborder: Adephaga
- Family: Carabidae
- Subfamily: Pterostichinae
- Tribe: Pterostichini
- Subtribe: Pterostichina
- Genus: Holcaspis; Chaudoir, 1865

Type species
- Holcaspis angustula (Chaudoir, 1865)

= Holcaspis =

Genus of beetles

Holcaspis is a genus of beetles in the family Carabidae, endemic to New Zealand.

== Taxonomy ==
The genus was originally proposed by Chaudoir in 1865, with a large number of species added by Thomas Broun in the late 19th century and early 20th century. The genus was revised by Everard Britton in 1940, and most recently by Michael Butcher in 1984, with several species added by Peter Johns in 2003. A phylogenetic analysis by Hanboonsong generally agreed with Butcher's species list, but found that H. oedicnema displayed an unusual amount of genetic variation and is probably a species complex.

== Description ==
Holcaspis beetles are black ground beetles, ranging between 10–26 mm in length. The mentum has deep pits on either side, and the labrum has six setae. The head has a variable H-shaped impression between the eyes. All species are flightless, with fused elytra. Species are distinguished by their patterns of setae, grooves, and punctures, and features of the male genitalia, as much as by size as shape.

Holcaspis adults are most commonly found in summer (November to March), but some have been trapped over winter, suggesting they live two years or more like other long-lived carabids. Several species have been observed being reproductively active over summer. Female:male sex ratios range from 1:0.8 to 1:3.4.

== Conservation ==
Species of Holcaspis tend to occur in the drier eastern areas of New Zealand, particularly in the South Island. Much of this area has been converted to farmland, with only small remnants of the continuous forest that once covered it remaining. As a consequence, several species of Holcaspis are listed as critically endangered by the New Zealand Department of Conservation: H. abdita, H. bathana, H. bidentella, and H. brevicula. For example Holcaspis brevicula, which originally probably inhabited dry kanuka forest on the Canterbury Plains, now only occurs in a single Pinus radiata plantation at Eyrewell Forest, which is being felled and converted to dairy farms.

== Species ==
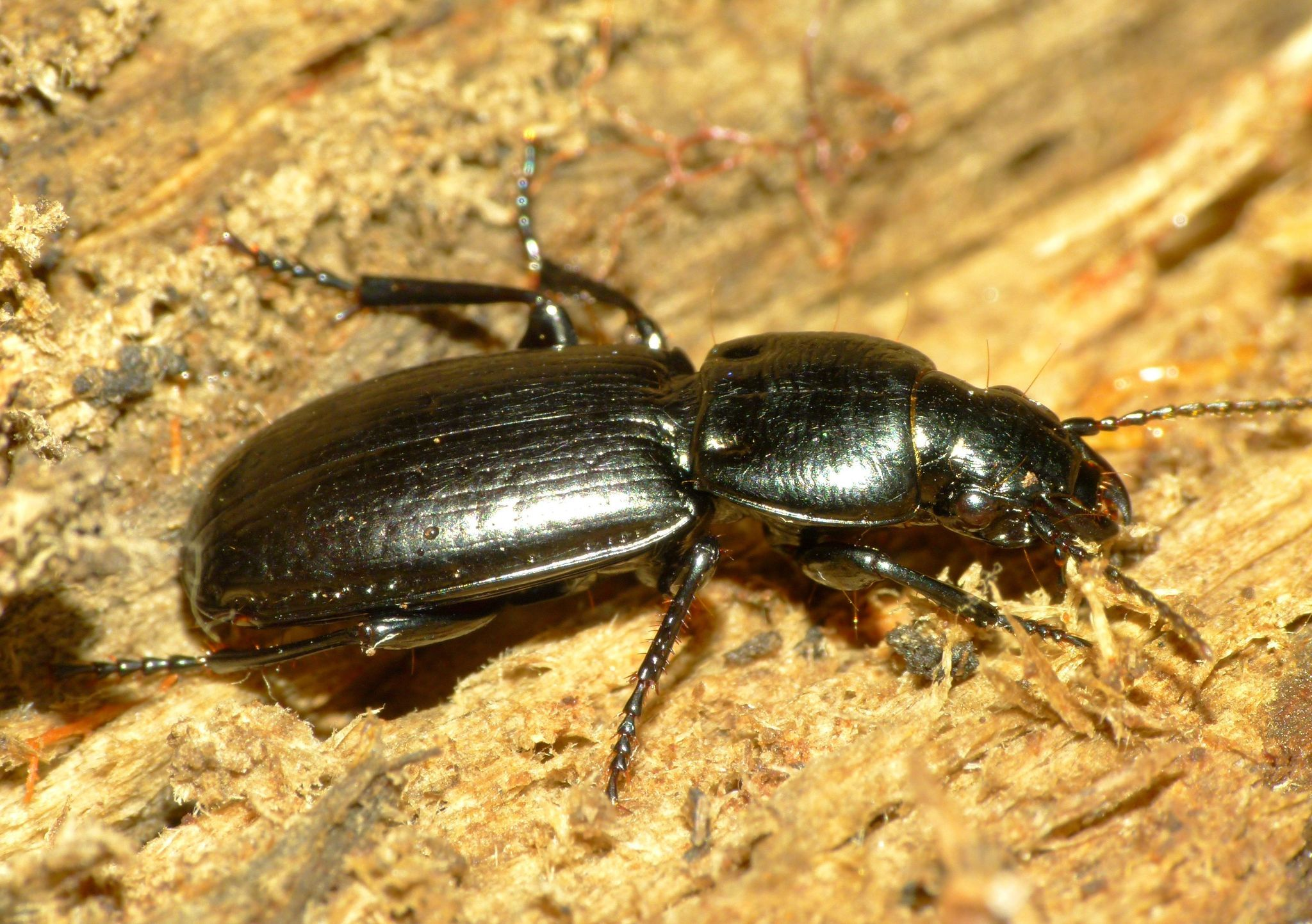
Holcaspis, Piano Flat, Southland, New Zealand

Holcaspis contains the following species:

- Holcaspis abdita Johns, 2003
- Holcaspis algida Britton, 1940
- Holcaspis angustula (Chaudoir, 1865)
- Holcaspis bathana Butcher, 1984
- Holcaspis bessatica Johns, 2003
- Holcaspis bidentella Johns, 2003
- Holcaspis brevicula Butcher, 1984
- Holcaspis brouniana (Sharp, 1886)
- Holcaspis catenulata Broun, 1882
- Holcaspis delator (Broun, 1893)
- Holcaspis dentifera (Broun, 1880)
- Holcaspis egregialis (Broun, 1917)
- Holcaspis elongella (White, 1846)
- Holcaspis falcis Butcher, 1984
- Holcaspis hispida (Broun, 1877)
- Holcaspis hudsoni Britton, 1940
- Holcaspis impigra Broun, 1886
- Holcaspis implica Butcher, 1984
- Holcaspis intermittens (Chaudoir, 1865)
- Holcaspis mordax Broun, 1886
- Holcaspis mucronata Broun, 1886
- Holcaspis obvelata Johns, 2003
- Holcaspis odontella (Broun, 1908)
- Holcaspis oedicnema Bates, 1874
- Holcaspis ohauensis Butcher, 1984
- Holcaspis ovatella (Chaudoir, 1865)
- Holcaspis placida Broun, 1881
- Holcaspis sinuiventris (Broun, 1908)
- Holcaspis sternalis Broun, 1881
- Holcaspis stewartensis Butcher, 1984
- Holcaspis subaenea (Guerin-Meneville, 1841)
- Holcaspis suteri (Broun, 1893)
- Holcaspis tripunctata Butcher, 1984
- Holcaspis vagepunctata (White, 1846)
- Holcaspis vexata (Broun, 1908)
