= Mount Dixon =

There are several places called Mount Dixon:

- Mount Dixon (Alaska), in the United States
- Mount Dixon (Heard Island), in Australia's subantarctic islands
- Dixon Peak, previously known as Mount Dixon, in Aoraki/Mount Cook National Park, New Zealand
- Mount Dixon (Grey District), in New Zealand's West Coast Region
- Mount Dixon (Northern Territory), in Australia
