= 1888 Ashley by-election =

New Zealand by-election

The 1888 Ashley by-election was a by-election held on 25 July 1888 in the Ashley electorate during the 10th New Zealand Parliament.

The by-election was caused by the death on 3 July of the incumbent MP William Fisher Pearson. The three initial candidates, in the order of them announcing themselves, were John Verrall, John Ollivier, and Marmaduke Dixon. Ollivier resigned from the contest on 17 July and at the same time, it became known that Alfred Saunders would become a candidate. At the nomination meeting, Dixon won the show of hands. The by-election had a close result and was won by John Verrall, with Dixon in third place just nine votes behind.

== Results ==
The following table gives the election result:

1888 Ashley by-election
Party	Candidate	Votes	%	±%
Independent	John Verrall	234	33.86	+21.67
Independent	Alfred Saunders	232	33.57	
Independent	Marmaduke Dixon	225	32.56	
Majority		2	0.29	−27.21
Turnout		691		
