= Marmaduke (disambiguation) =

Marmaduke is a syndicated comic strip and the name of its main character, a Great Dane.

Marmaduke may also refer to:

== People ==
- Marmaduke (given name), including a list of people
- Marmaduke (surname), a list of people
- John Dawson (musician), American country-rock musician nicknamed "Marmaduke"
- John Smoltz (born 1967), American baseball pitcher nicknamed "Marmaduke"

== Entertainment ==
=== Fictional characters ===
- Marmaduke Brooker, from the TV series Carpoolers, played by T. J. Miller
- Marmaduke "Chuffy" Chuffnell, 5th Baron Chuffnell, a fictional character in P. G. Wodehouse's Jeeves novels
- Moose Mason, in the Archie Comics universe
- Marmaduke Ruggles, the main character of the 1935 American comedy film Ruggles of Red Gap, played by Charles Laughton
- Marmaduke Surfaceblow, a fictional engineer
- Marmaduke Temple, judge and land owner in the novel The Pioneers by James Fenimore Cooper
- Marmaduke the Lorry, protagonist of Elizabeth Chapman's children's book series

=== Films ===
- Marmaduke (2010 film), based on the comic strip
- Marmaduke (2022 film), based on the comic strip

=== Songs ===
- "Marmaduke", a jazz song written by Charlie Parker
- "Marmaduke", a 1972 rock song by Marvin, Welch & Farrar

== Other uses ==
- Marmaduke, Arkansas, United States, a city
- English ship Marmaduke, a 17th-century ship formerly named Revenge
