= Olivia Spencer Bower =

New Zealand artist and painter (1905–1982)

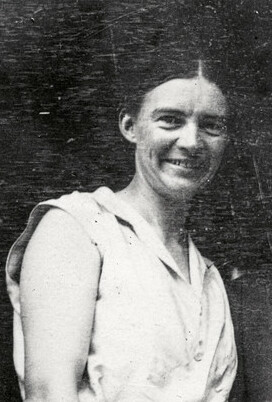
- Spencer Bower, c. 1930
- Born: Catherine Olivia Orme Spencer Bower; 13 April 1905; St Neots, England
- Died: 8 July 1982 (aged 77); Christchurch, New Zealand
- Education: Canterbury College School of Art; Elam School of Fine Arts
- Known for: Oil and Water colour painting
- Mother: Rosa Spencer Bower

Catherine Olivia Orme Spencer Bower (13 April 1905 – 8 July 1982) was a New Zealand painter. Born in England, she spent her adult life in New Zealand, mostly in Christchurch.

== Early life ==
Spencer Bower was born in St Neots, Huntingdonshire, England on 13 April 1905, along with her twin brother, Marmaduke. Her mother, Rosa Dixon, was an artist and her father, Anthony Spencer Bower, was a civil engineer. The couple met in England and returned to New Zealand in 1920, when Olivia Spencer Bower was 15 years old.

She spent her first nine years in St Neots, until the family moved to Bournemouth in 1914.

== Training and career ==
In England, Spencer Bower was introduced to the techniques of watercolour painting by her school art teacher. In Christchurch, she attended Rangi Ruru Girls' School and began studying at the Canterbury College School of Art one afternoon a week. Spencer Bower attended the art school for eight years in total, alongside artists such as Rita Angus and Rata Lovell-Smith, leaving at the age of 24.

Spencer Bower then returned to England to study at the Slade School of Fine Art and undertook a painting tour of France and Italy, returning to New Zealand in 1931. Spencer Bower began exhibiting with 'The Group' at this time. She spent more than 5 years in Auckland, studying at the Elam School of Fine Arts. She concentrated on portraits and figurative works, many of them painted in oils.

== Death and legacy ==
Spencer Bower died of lung cancer in Christchurch in 1982. The Olivia Spencer Bower Award, a residency opportunity for artists in New Zealand, was established with funds left by the artist to a charitable trust upon her death.

A biography, Olivia Spencer Bower: Making her own discoveries, by art historian Julie King, was published by Canterbury University Press in 2015.

== Collections ==
Works by Spencer Bower are held in many New Zealand public art galleries and cultural organisations, including the Auckland Art Gallery, the Alexander Turnbull Library, the Museum of New Zealand Te Papa Tongarewa and the Christchurch Art Gallery.

- Works at Auckland Art Gallery
- Works at the Alexander Turnbull Library
- Works at Te Papa
- Works at Christchurch Art Gallery

== Further information ==
- Julie King interviewed on Olivia Spencer Bower: Making her own discoveries, Standing Room Only, RNZ National, 13 December 2015.
- Olivia Spencer Bower archive, held by Christchurch Art Gallery
- Adams, Grace, Afternoon Tea with Olivia Spencer Bower, Art New Zealand, no. 26, Autumn 1983
- Olivia Spencer Bower: Retrospective, digitised copy of 1978 exhibition at Robert McDougall Art Gallery
- Rosier, Pat: 'Olivia Spencer Bower' (obituary), Broadsheet, no. 106, January/February 1983, pp. 42–43
- Hamilton, Judith: "Olivia Spencer Bower: The Spinners Series", Art New Zealand 50 Autumn 1989, p 76-79.
- Hartrick, Elizabeth: "Support and Sustenance: The Olivia Spencer Bower Foundation", Art New Zealand 88 Spring 1998, p 51-53.
