= 1867 Ashley by-election =

New Zealand by-election

The 1867 Ashley by-election was a by-election held on 7 August 1867 during the 4th New Zealand Parliament in the Canterbury electorate of Ashley.

The by-election was caused by the resignation of the incumbent MP Lancelot Walker. The by-election was won by Henry Tancred.

Tancred was unopposed. There were complaints that the nominating booth at the Survey Office in Mount Grey Downs was in the least populated part of the electorate and difficult of access. James Henry Moore, a member of the Canterbury Provincial Council representing the Sefton electorate, suggested that the Road Board Office at Saltwater Creek was more accessible.
