= Richard Meredith (New Zealand politician) =

Irish-born New Zealand politician

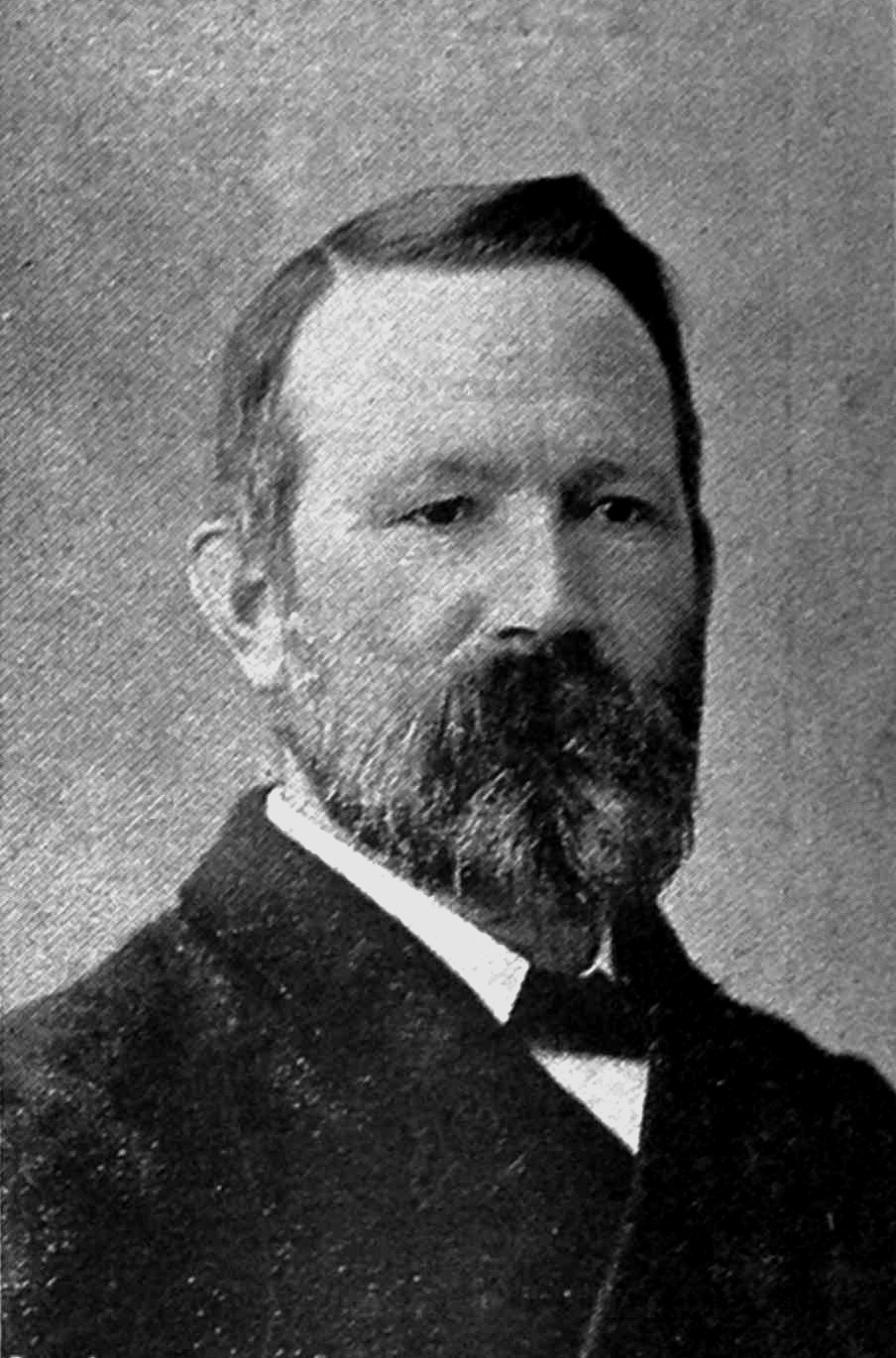

Member of the New Zealand Parliament for Ashley
- In office 5 December 1890 – 5 November 1902
- Preceded by: John Verrall

Personal details
- Born: 27 January 1843 Tullow, County Carlow, Ireland
- Died: 20 August 1918 (aged 75) Waimate, New Zealand
- Party: Liberal

Richard Meredith (27 January 1843 – 20 August 1918) was a Liberal Party Member of Parliament in New Zealand. A teacher by training, he was a farmer later in his life. He lived in Canterbury and was a member of many public bodies.

== Biography ==
=== Early life ===
Meredith was born at Tullow, County Carlow, Ireland, in 1843. He received his education at Tullow public school and was a schoolmaster for some years. Meredith emigrated to New Zealand in 1863, arriving at Lyttelton on the SS Accrington. After arriving he worked as a teacher until 1889 and then became a farmer at Cust (then known as Moeraki Downs).

=== Political career ===
New Zealand Parliament
Years	Term	Electorate	Party
1890–1893	11th	Ashley	Liberal
1893–1896	12th	Ashley	Liberal
1896–1899	13th	Ashley	Liberal
1899–1902	14th	Ashley	Liberal

He won the Ashley electorate in the 1890 general election against James Dupré Lance, and was re-elected three times. In the 1902 election, he was defeated for the replacement seat of Hurunui by Andrew Rutherford (who was also of the Liberal Party). Meredith was a temperance campaigner.

Other elected positions that he held included North Canterbury Board of Education (from 1889, including chairman in 1892), and the Canterbury Land Board (since 1891). He was a member of the Technical School Committee in Christchurch and later a member of the Timaru High School board.

=== Family and death ===
On 10 April 1867, Meredith married Louisa Willis (1847–1929) at the Durham Street Wesleyan Church in Christchurch. She was the eldest daughter of James Willis (1824–1866) who was the proprietor of the Canterbury Standard. They had four sons and five daughters before his wife left him, taking all the possessions and leaving just a portrait of him behind. Historian George Macdonald described his personality as "bombastic". He died at Waimate on 20 August 1918 and was buried at Waimate Old Cemetery.

== Notes ==
New Zealand Parliament
Preceded by John Verrall	Member of Parliament for Ashley; 1890–1902	Constituency abolished
