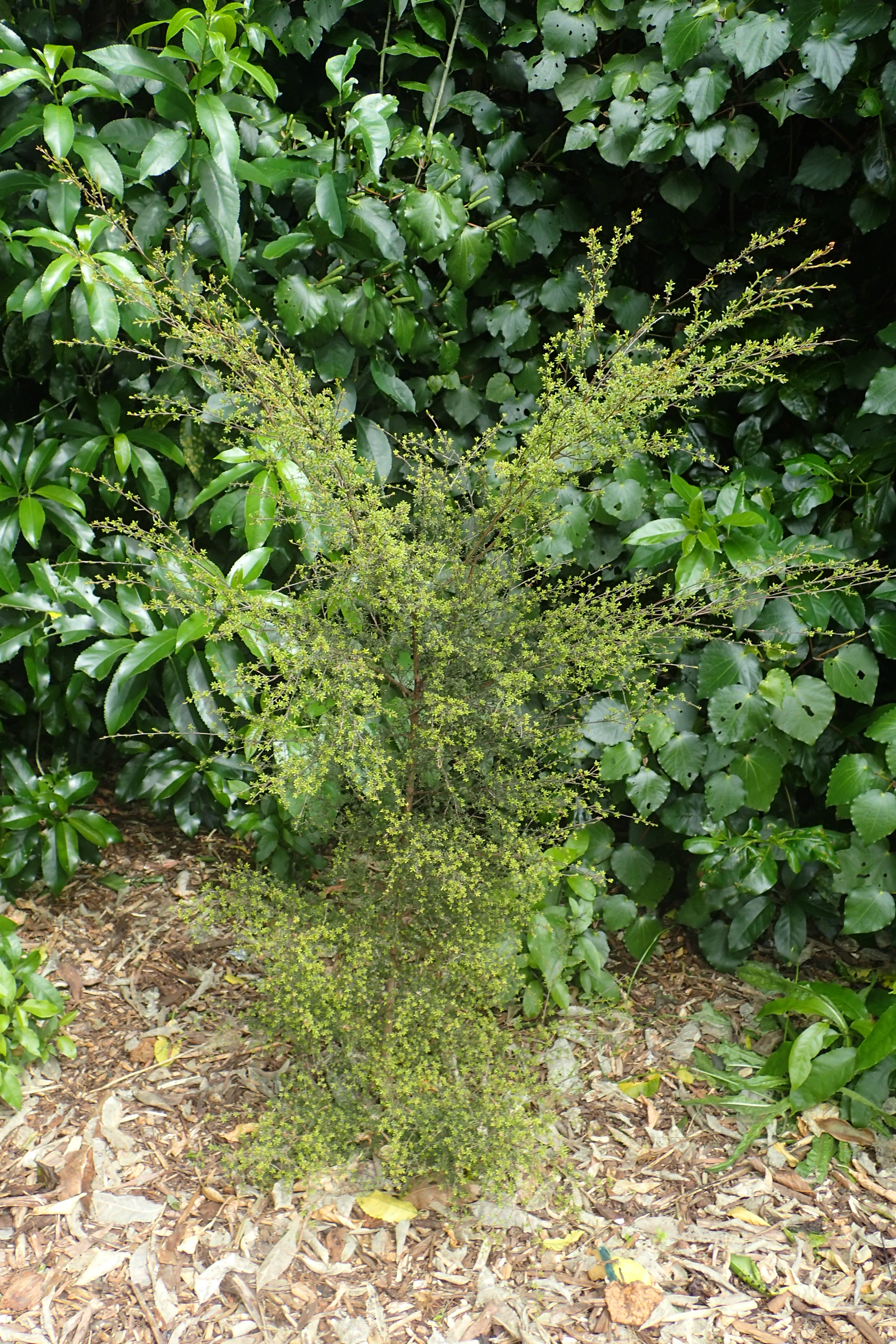

Scientific classification
- Kingdom: Plantae
- Clade: Tracheophytes
- Clade: Angiosperms
- Clade: Eudicots
- Clade: Rosids
- Order: Myrtales
- Family: Myrtaceae
- Genus: Kunzea
- Species: K. serotina

Binomial name
- Kunzea serotina (de Lange) Tolken

= Kunzea serotina =

Species of shrub

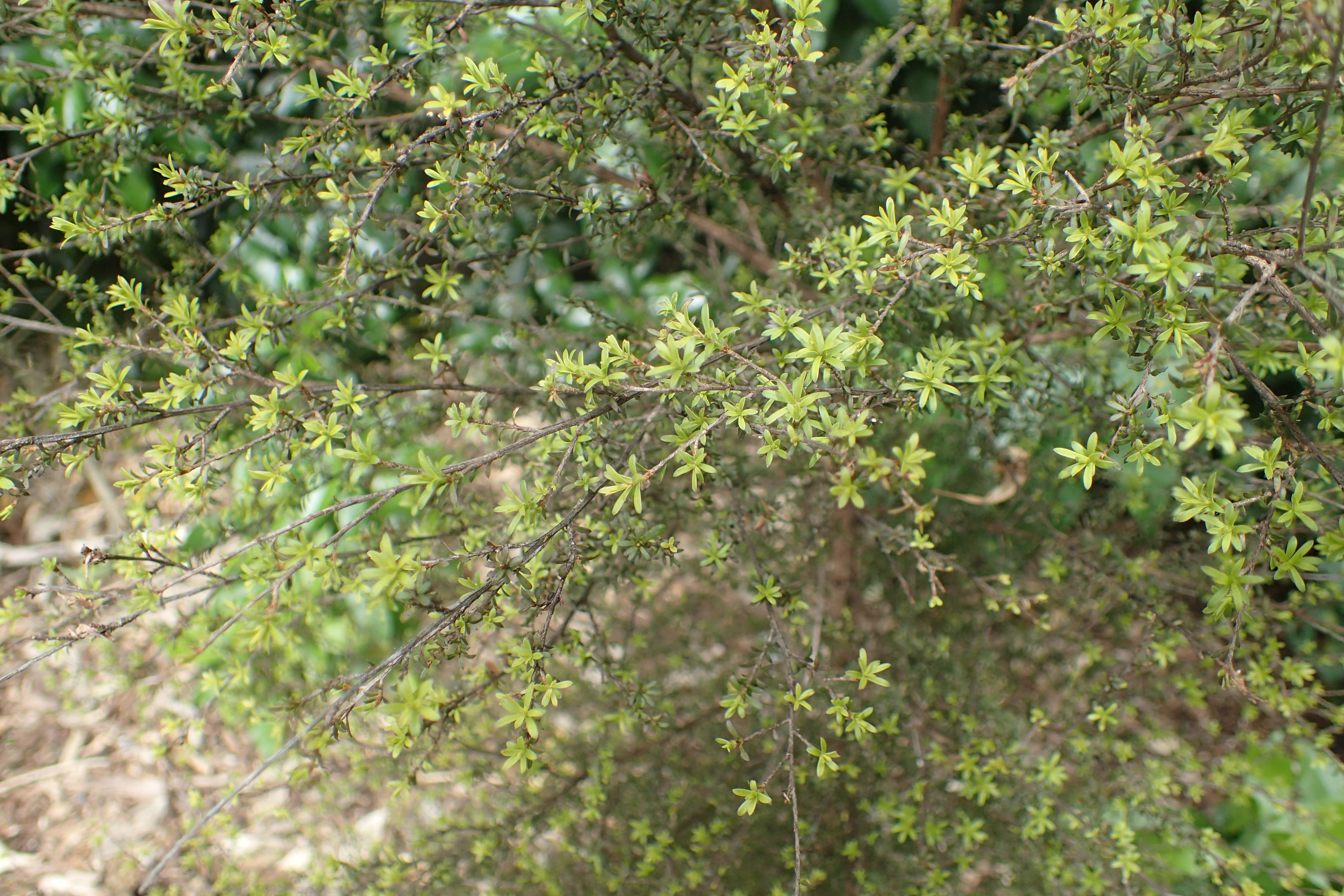
Kunzea serotina

Kunzea serotina, commonly known by its Māori name makahikatoa, is a flowering tree or shrub of the family Myrtaceae in the genus Kunzea, found in both North Island and South Island of New Zealand.

== Description ==
Kunzea serotina is a tree or shrub that has an erect growth pattern with fastigiate growing branches that form a pyramidal (pyramid-like) canopy. The growth pattern may vary under a stable environment in older trees. The shrub has a single trunk arising from the ground (base). Less commonly, it may have 2 to 3 trunks growing at the same time. The base is covered with a protective wall layer while the rest of the trunk is covered with the dead cambium tissue called the bark. The bark of K. serotina is a greyish-white to pinkish white colour. It has cracks which become bigger and crumpled as the bark grows older, forming a secondary layer of bark. The old bark is similar to the new bark, but has more cracks and crumples, with the upper surface of the older bark hanging loose and eventually peeling off. The plant has numerous branches which grow at or close to the base of the trunk. These are short and stout with a fastigiate branching with numerous leafy branchlets including a brachyblast within the branchlet and forming a curled apex. The vegetative buds are not clearly visible and hidden by the foliage. It has a diameter of 0.2-0.5mm covered with a bud scale, having a yellow-brown to red-brown colour forming an ovate shape. The midrib supports the upper half with a lengthy cuspidate tip, no lateral veins and oil gland and keel apex ciliate.

The leaves and shoots are red-green, and pale-green spreads through the red or bright green colour of the leaves. The leaf and shoot lamina are (0.8-) 5.2 x 9–7.8) x (0.6-) 0.8 (-1.2) mm, with a narrow oval shape. The mature leaf has a dark glossy green or bronze green colour with the leaf margin and base red with a lamina of (2.0-) 3.7 (-6.3) x (0. 8- ) 1.1 (1.8) mm with a narrow oval shape with no hair and smooth surface. Flowering is from November to May, with peak flowering in January and February. The inflorescent compact and corymbiform with (1-3) 8 (-12) flowered with a length of 25mm long. Inflorescences on branchlets tips extend out with active vegetative growth without the male flower. Deciduous pherophylls with foliose form and about 0.9–25 mm in length, it has a round end and tapered to at the base. Hypanthium has a bell-shaped structure that is (1.6-) 2.0 (-3.4) x 1.9 (-3.5) mm and a free portion of 0.4 – 0.8 mm long with a dark green or red-brown colour. The flower has a diameter of (2.8-) 5.2 (-8.8) mm with its petals having a white colour flashed with pink and a broadly ovate. 1.4 – 1.6 (-2.0) x 1.2 – 1.6 (-2.0) mm petal with a yellow gland oil present. Anther 0.04 – 0.06 x 0.02 x 0.04 mm in length and is the connective gland, orange and flushed with rose in colour when fresh, with the pollen (11.1-) 12.4 (-13.7) μm and the ovary 3-4 (-5) locular. White style of 0.6 -1.2 mm in length and the stigma has a compact head, wider and flat. The fruit is short and sometimes cuplar with the fruit size of (1.2-) 2.1 (-3.0) x (1.2-) 2.1 (-3.4) mm and the seed has orange-brown to dark brown colour and narrowly rectangular shape and narrow at the end.

== Distribution ==
=== Natural global range ===
Kunzea is an Australasian genus that is endemic to Australia and New Zealand. Species of Kunzea are commonly found in North and South Island of New Zealand, in Western Australia and the great barrier islands of Australia. The Kunzea ericoides complex consists of 10 species that are endemic to New Zealand, seven of which were described for the first time by Peter James de Lange. Kunzea serotina is one of those seven, and is endemic to the North and South Island of New Zealand. It is a native tree or shrub that is not found anywhere in Australia but restricted to New Zealand.

=== New Zealand range ===
Kunzea serotina is a New Zealand native shrub or tree that is restricted to New Zealand North and South Island. It was first sited in Makaroro River, eastern Ruahine Range. In the North Island, it is found throughout the Paeroa Range, Mt. Tarawera, Kaingaroa Forest, Central Volcanic Plateau and the Northern Aorangi Range. K. serotina is abundant north-east of Rangitaiki River, where it grows between flat and upland podocarp forest. In the South Island, it was first sited in Marlborough. It grows all throughout Canterbury from the north to the east Canterbury and down to Eastern Central Otago, growing along the ranges and remnants in the Canterbury plains. K.serotina is distributed throughout South Island, and in the North of Canterbury it is found east of upper Wairau, west of Karamea, and Wangapeka Valley and lakes around Nelson. The distribution spreads down to East Canterbury along the mountain ranges through upper Hurunui, mainly the Hanmer area and to Sumner. Crossing the Canterbury Plains further down south are remnants of K. serotina in the area around Lakes Wānaka and Hāwea, the Clutha River / Mata-Au, and Nenthorn.

=== Habitat preferences ===
The Kunzea ericoides complex which includes Kunzea serotina is a tall shrub or tree species that is commonly found throughout New Zealand. The species grows particularly in areas that native forest once occupied but was removed and invades pasture lands. It easily establishes and becomes the dominant vegetation in the area. K. serotina grows mostly near inland mountain ranges; it prefers growing in seasonal frosting conditions. It is found growing on steep slopes on mountain ranges down to rivers and lakes, tussock grassland and above tree line on mountain tops. It is abundant on soil that has a lot of rock fragments and is easily affected by flooding.

== Life cycle/phenology ==
The Kunzea eriocoides complex species flowers during early and late spring; the flowering of Kunzea serotina initiates in late spring (November) and peaks in mid-summer (January – February) unlike other Kunzea species in the K. ericoides complex. The later flowering of the species is where the species name is derived from. The flowering of the K. serotina starts in November to May, flowering peaks in January and February and fruiting is from January to December. The seeds germinate and grow in different kind of soil conditions, with the seeds having a lifespan of up to five months in dry conditions. Germination of the seeds depends on the condition where the seed has been dispersed; if it is dispersed under a cover of moss the seed is slow to germinate, but it germinates rapidly if dispersed on bare soil without any cover. K. serotina is a fast growing trees or shrub, but is short lived, living up to 80 – 150 years. The juvenile K. serotina takes approximately seven years (less than ten) to reach reproductive maturity, at which point the tree or shrub reaches a height of 1.5m. During its short lifespan the tree or shrub grows to a height of approximately 15m, increasing the trunk to about 60 cm in diameter.

It produces a huge seedbank on the soil surface under the plant, where the seeds await dispersal through rainwater runoff, or germinate if the conditions are viable. The seeds of K. serotina are not adapted for long-distance dispersal, which depends on rainfall runoff to disperse the seed. Since the plant lacks the ability for long-distance dispersal it has adapted a character that enables it to survive up to five months or longer, if the seeds remain dry throughout the five months.

== Diet and foraging ==
Kunzea serotina grows on soils that contain rock fragments and is barred close to the top soil. It also grows in areas where the soil is prone to flooding, steep slopes, and hard rock. K. serotina succeeds previous vegetation that once was growing in the area but was removed by natural disturbances. K. serotina colonizes more easily than the native forest or vegetation including pasture land that once dominated the landscape. Changes in the concentration of nitrogen in the will affect the growth performance of K. serotina; however, limited information is known about the species' soil nutrient requirements. The plant can tolerate dry soil conditions, twhichhat enables it to perform better than native forest. According to Olsen, it is found in areas where the soil is free-drained, with different soil types, from sand and loam to alluvium, sedimentary and ultra-mafic rock.

== Predators, parasites, and diseases ==
The Kunzea serotina and other Kunzea spp. are not grazed by any livestock or browsing animal, but the flower provides a source of food (nectar) for the native bees, birds, gecko, flies, moths and beetles. Ochrocydus huttoni (kanuka longhorn) larvae are a pest that drills tunnels into the stem of the living K. serotina stem. Kunzea serotina is also regarded as a weed by farmers, as it can easily colonize pasture land.

== Other information ==
Kunzea serotina was first recognized by W. Colenso in 1849 in Makaroro River and was also recognized by Allan in 1961 then later was first described in 2014. Before it was recognized and described it was known to the Māori people as "makahikatoa" meaning "white-wood". K. serotina is not a species that is threatened or at risk but abundant through New Zealand. Kunzea serotina has been used in restoration projects, such as Eyrewell Forest in North Canterbury because, as mentioned above in Predators, Parasites, and Diseases it is not eaten by grazing animals making it useful to spread further than fenced off restoration areas. This is by ways of germination and not being disturbed by grazing livestock.
