= Henry Tancred (New Zealand politician) =

New Zealand politician (1816–1884)

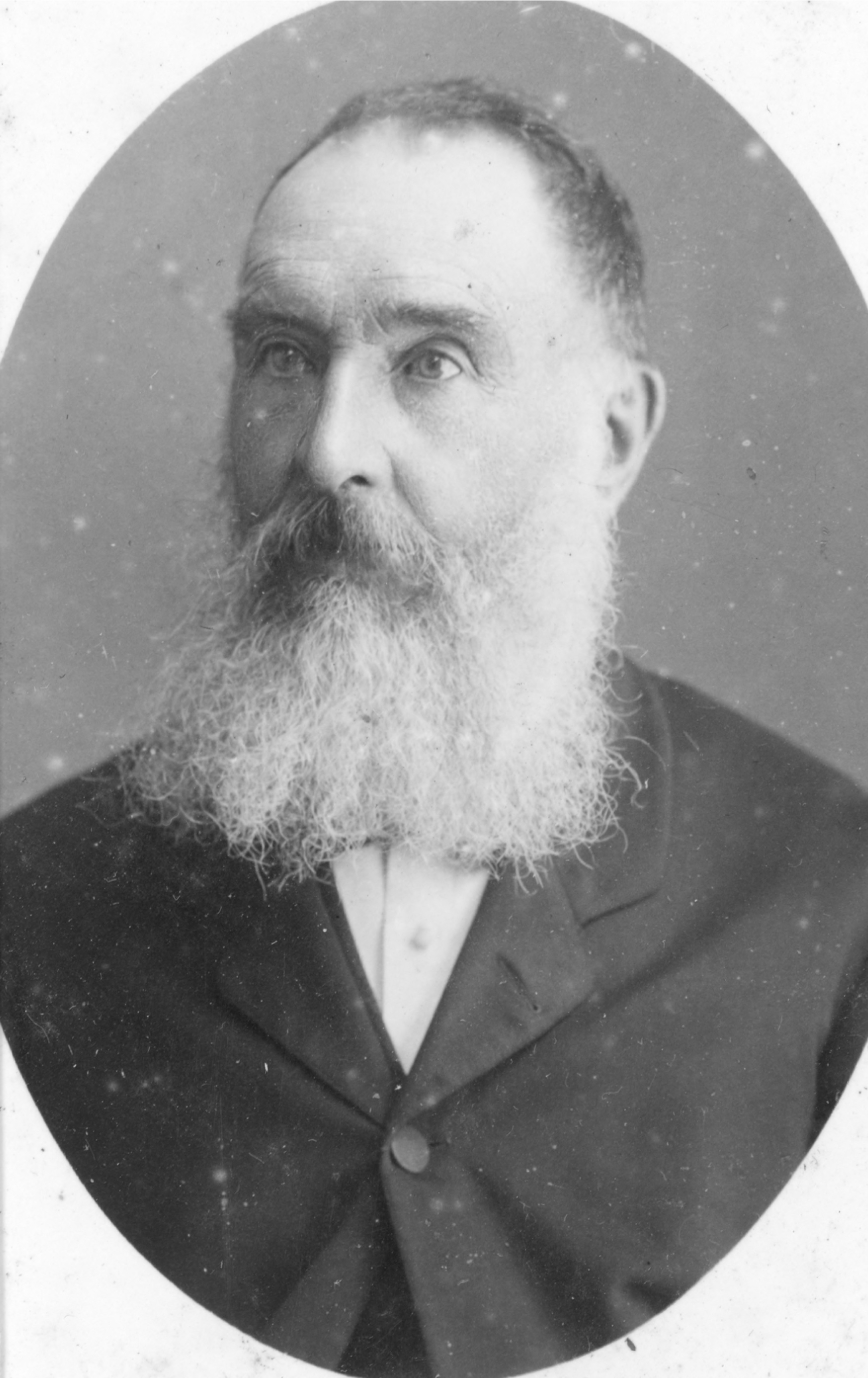
- Tancred, c. 1882

1st Postmaster-General
- In office 3 November 1858 – 12 July 1861
- Succeeded by: Crosbie Ward

Member of the New Zealand Parliament for Ashley
- In office 1867–1870
- Preceded by: Lancelot Walker
- Succeeded by: John Brown

Member of the Legislative Council
- In office 1856–1866

Personal details
- Born: Henry John Tancred; May 4, 1816 Isle of Wight, UK
- Died: April 27, 1884 (aged 67) Christchurch, New Zealand
- Party: Independent
- Spouse: Georgeanna Richmond (m. 1857)
- Relations: Thomas Tancred (brother); Andrew Richmond (brother-in-law); Mathew Richmond (father-in-law)
- Children: 0

Henry John Tancred (14 May 1816 – 27 April 1884) was a New Zealand politician.

== Early life ==
Tancred was baptised on 14 May 1816, on the Isle of Wight. His father was Sir Thomas Tancred, 6th Baronet and his elder brother was Sir Thomas Tancred, 7th Baronet. He was educated at Rugby School. He served in the Austrian army and fought in Austria, Hungary and Italy. He was severely injured in a fall from a horse and had a speech impairment as a result.

== New Zealand ==
Back in England to recuperate, Tancred became interested in the Canterbury Association and decided to emigrate. He arrived in Canterbury in December 1850 from Wellington on the Barbara Gordon, just prior to the arrival of the first Canterbury settlers.

He married Georgeanna Janet Grace Richmond at Christ Church Cathedral in Nelson on 30 July 1857. She was the sister of Andrew Richmond and the daughter of Mathew Richmond.

== Political career ==
=== Provincial Council ===
Tancred was one of three candidates for the role of Superintendent in 1853; he lost to James FitzGerald.

Tancred became a member of the Canterbury Provincial Council at its establishment in 1853 and retained membership until the abolition of provincial government in 1876. In 1866, he was elected speaker of this council.

Tancred was a member of the New Zealand Legislative Council from 1856 to 1866.

Tancred was a member of three ministries. He was appointed as a minister without portfolio in the 2nd Parliament in the Sewell Ministry, from 18 April to 20 May 1856.

In the first Stafford Ministry, which Tancred joined on 5 August 1858 as a member of the executive council, he was appointed as Secretary for Crown Lands (19 August 1858) and three months later (3 November) Postmaster-General. He held those offices until the end of this government on 12 July 1861.

In the 3rd Parliament, Tancred was a member of the executive council of the Domett Ministry from 6 August 1862 until 6 February 1863.

=== Member of the lower house ===
New Zealand Parliament
Years	Term	Electorate	Party
1867–1870	4th	Ashley	Independent

Tancred was the Member of Parliament for Ashley in the fourth Parliament from 1867 to 1870, when he retired.

== Death ==
Tancred died on 27 April 1884, aged 68, in Christchurch. He was buried at Barbadoes Street Cemetery on April 30. He was survived by his wife. There were no children from the marriage.

== Notes ==
Political offices
New title	Postmaster-General; 1858–1861	Succeeded by Crosbie Ward
New Zealand Parliament
Preceded by Lancelot Walker	Member of Parliament for Ashley; 1867–1870	Succeeded by John Evans Brown
