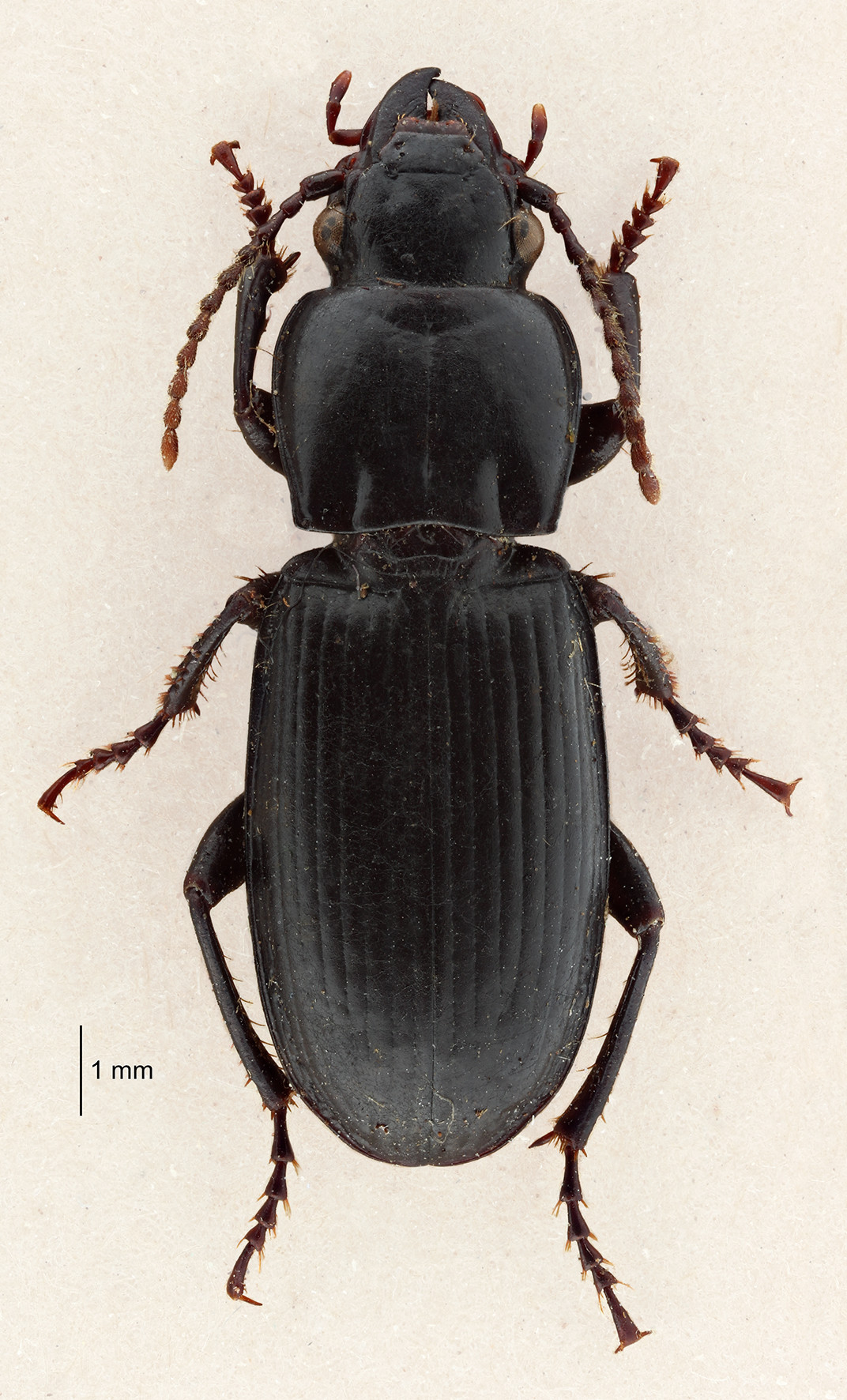

Conservation status
- Nationally Critical (NZ TCS)

Scientific classification
- Kingdom: Animalia
- Phylum: Arthropoda
- Clade: Pancrustacea
- Class: Insecta
- Order: Coleoptera
- Suborder: Adephaga
- Family: Carabidae
- Genus: Holcaspis
- Species: H. brevicula

Binomial name
- Holcaspis brevicula Butcher, 1984

= Holcaspis brevicula =

Species of beetle

Holcaspis brevicula, the Eyrewell ground beetle, is a species of carabid beetle native to New Zealand, one of a number of small black flightless beetles in the genus Holcaspis that inhabit the dry eastern lowlands of the South Island. H. brevicula is very rare—only ten specimens have ever been collected—and either critically endangered or extinct: the species was found only in Eyrewell Forest, a single plantation of exotic pine trees now converted into dairy farms.

== Description ==
Holcaspis brevicula was named and described in 1984 by Michael Butcher in a revision of the genus Holcaspis. At that point it was known from only two male specimens, both collected in Eyrewell Forest on the Canterbury Plains in 1961. H. brevicula can be distinguished from its slightly larger close relative H. algida by the patterns of punctures and setae on its pronotum and elytra, and by the male's shorter aedeagus. It is a small (10–11 mm long) shiny black ground beetle, and is flightless, predatory, and probably nocturnal. As adults have been collected during winter months, H. brevicula probably lives for over two years – relatively long for a beetle.

== Distribution ==
The Eyrewell Forest area has dry, stony, free-draining soils, and its original vegetation area was probably kānuka (Kunzea) shrubland and forest up to 10 m high, with some tōtara (Podocarpus totara). This habitat was widely burnt off by Polynesian and European settlers, and now exists on the Canterbury Plains only as small fragments, less than 20 ha. There are several such fragments in the Eyrewell area, the largest being the 16 ha Spencer-Bower Reserve. All are on private land, some protected by a QEII covenant, except for the Eyrewell Scientific Reserve (2.4 ha), which is administered by the Department of Conservation.

The poor soil at Eyrewell was considered unsuitable for agriculture and used mainly for sheep farming. Between 1928 and 1932, the 30 foot (9.1 m) tall mānuka (Leptospermum scoparium) forest at Eyrewell was cleared and the 6764 ha Eyrewell Forest plantation of introduced Monterey pine (Pinus radiata) was established. Most of the area has been in plantation forestry ever since, with blocks of trees being felled in rotation approximately every 27 years. Some of the older blocks had an understory of kānuka up to 4 m high and most included native shrubs, herbs, and mosses, despite regular tree felling and replanting.

Holcaspis brevicula was present in kānuka forest at the time it was knocked down and interplanted with pine trees, and has persisted in the regularly-felled plantation forest. At the same time it has disappeared from the remaining fragments of nearby kānuka forest, which appear to be too small, increasingly degraded, and browsed by sheep to support populations of the beetle. Intensive searching and pitfall trapping in remnant kānuka forest, pine plantation, and adjacent pasture, comprising 57,494 trap days over 2000–2005, captured five more specimens of H. brevicula. All were found in the pine forest. Three more specimens, collected between 1956 and 1967, were located in the Forest Research Insect Collection. All the ten known specimens of this beetle came from the Eyrewell Forest, which thus contained the only known population of this species.

== Conservation ==
Because of its rarity and single locality, H. brevicula was classified in 2016 as "nationally critical and under acute threat of extinction". It was chosen as one of the 150 priority species in the Department of Conservation's 2017 Threatened Species Strategy. The beetle has no legal protection under the Wildlife Act, and in New Zealand plantation forests on private land can be felled, even if they are the only habitat of a threatened species.

Land-use change in the Canterbury Plains in the 21st century has been towards irrigation and dairy farming, more profitable than traditional dryland farming and forestry. Eyrewell Forest was Crown Land, administered by the New Zealand Forest Service; it was purchased from Ngāi Tahu in 1848 as part of the £2000 Kemp Purchase of 8 million ha. In 2000, the Eyrewell Forest was returned to Ngāi Tūāhuriri, a subtribe of Ngāi Tahu, as part of the 1998 Ngāi Tahu settlement. Ngāi Tahu Farming proposed converting 1200 ha of the land, now known as Te Whenua Hou, into three trial dairy farms, in the face of some opposition from within the iwi. Six farms were later established as forestry licenses expired, then a seventh. In 2016 it was announced the Eyrewell Forest would be completely felled and converted into 8,500 ha of pivot-irrigated pasture to support 14,000 dairy cows in 13 farms and 7 dairy support farms, with almost all the forest to be cleared by 2017/2018. As of January 2019, all but 120 ha of the Eyrewell Forest had been cleared, as can be seen in Sentinel satellite imagery. The conversion involved "felling all the trees, ripping out the root stock and then pretty much mulching the coarser woody material which is left behind into small chips… not only shredding any plant matter, but any invertebrates that are larger than a pinhead."

Correspondence obtained under the Official Information Act revealed that the Department of Conservation had been unable to reach an agreement with Ngāi Tahu Farming over preserving enough beetle habitat to save the species. Forest and Bird criticised the Whenua Hou development, claiming it would lead to the extinction of H. brevicula. Ngāi Tahu responded that they would be planting 150 ha of native shrubland to replace the 6700 ha of pine habitat, and a further 150 ha around the edges of farms and buildings. The beetle does not currently inhabit the remaining native forest in the area, so it is unclear whether it would colonise and inhabit these new plantings. The revegetation project appears to have been largely unsuccessful, with forest trees being planted in dry open pastures, exposed to excess nutrient runoff from cow pasture.

Areas marked as “indigenous vegetation restoration” on Ngāi Tahu Farming plans

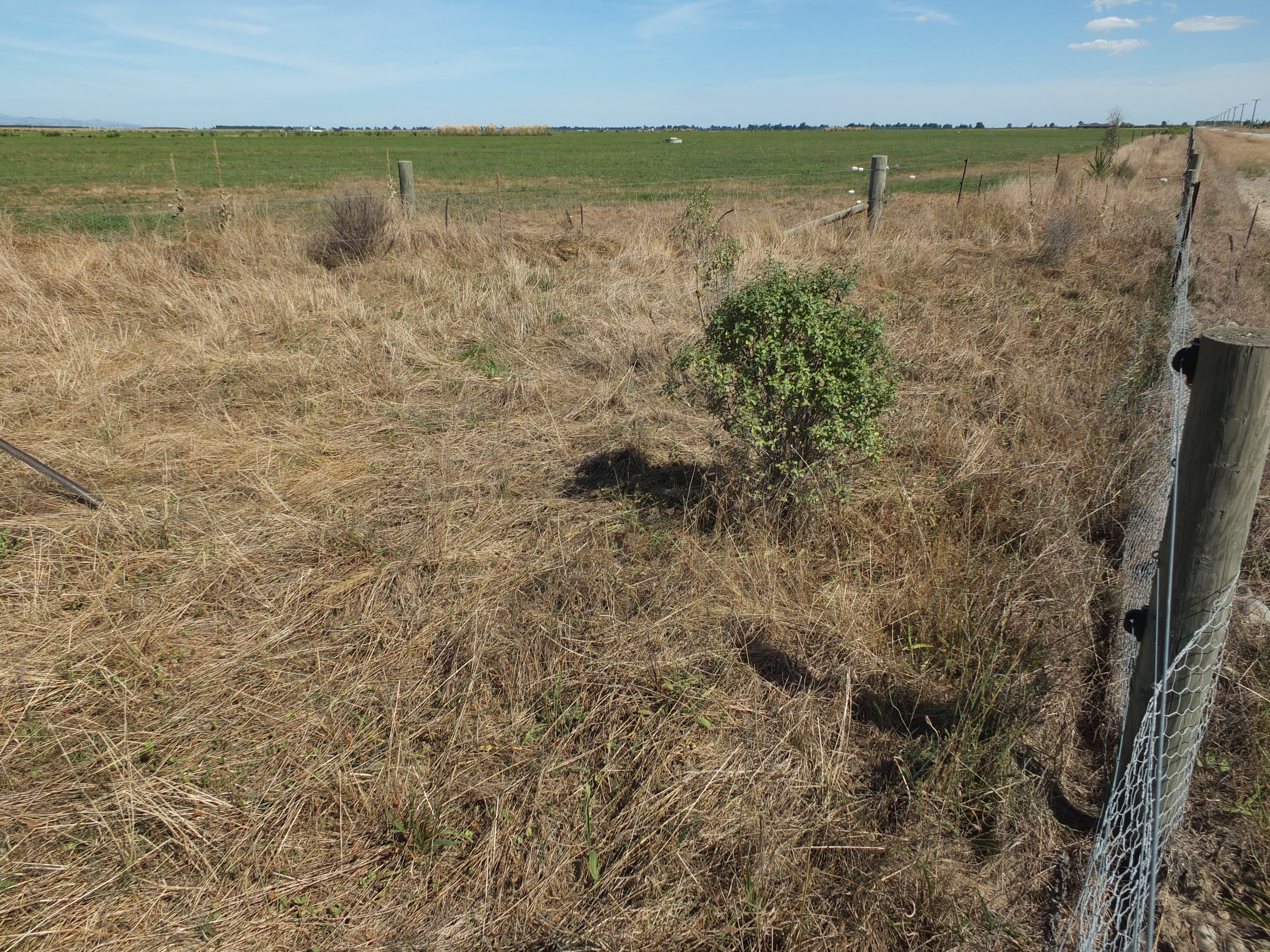

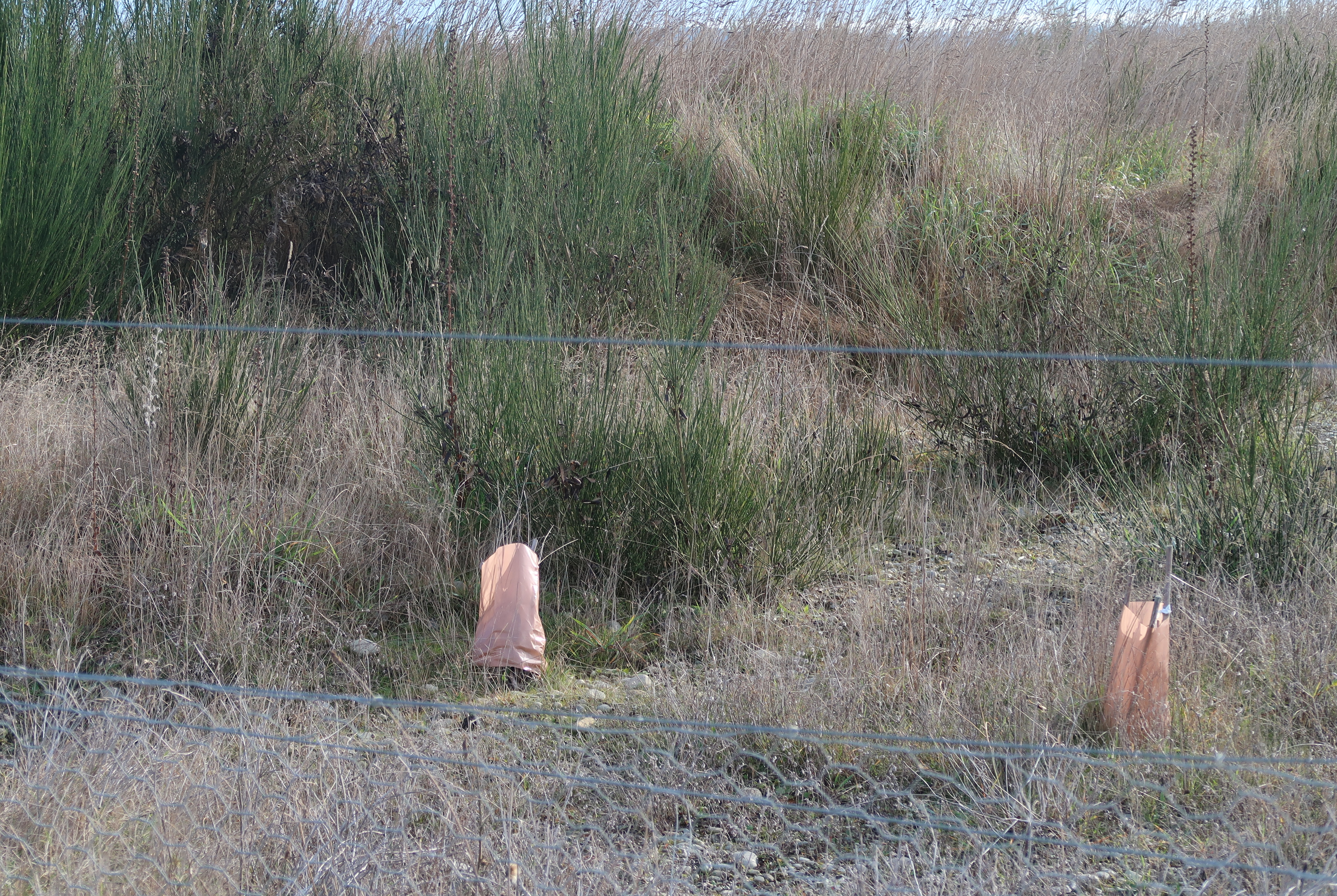

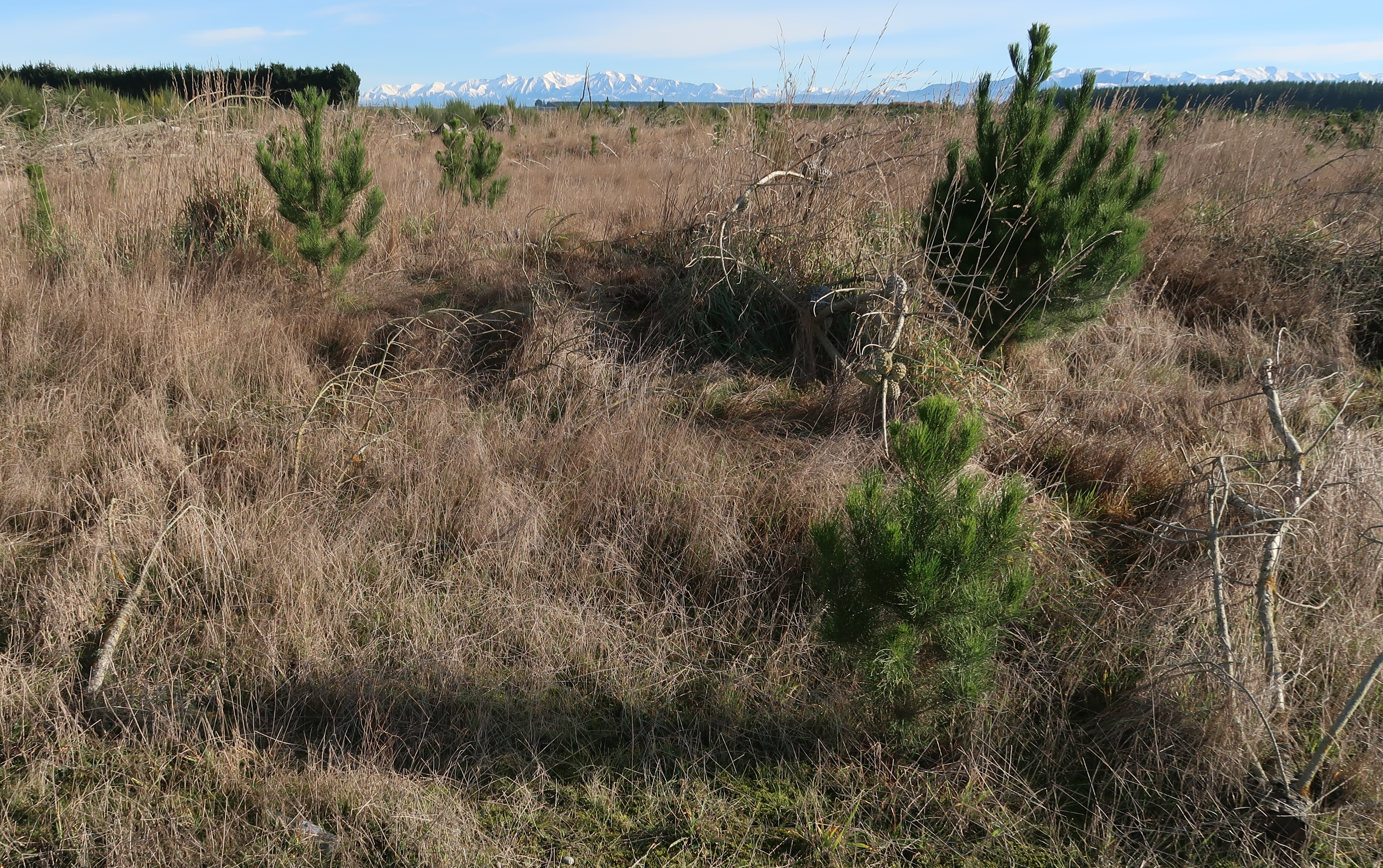

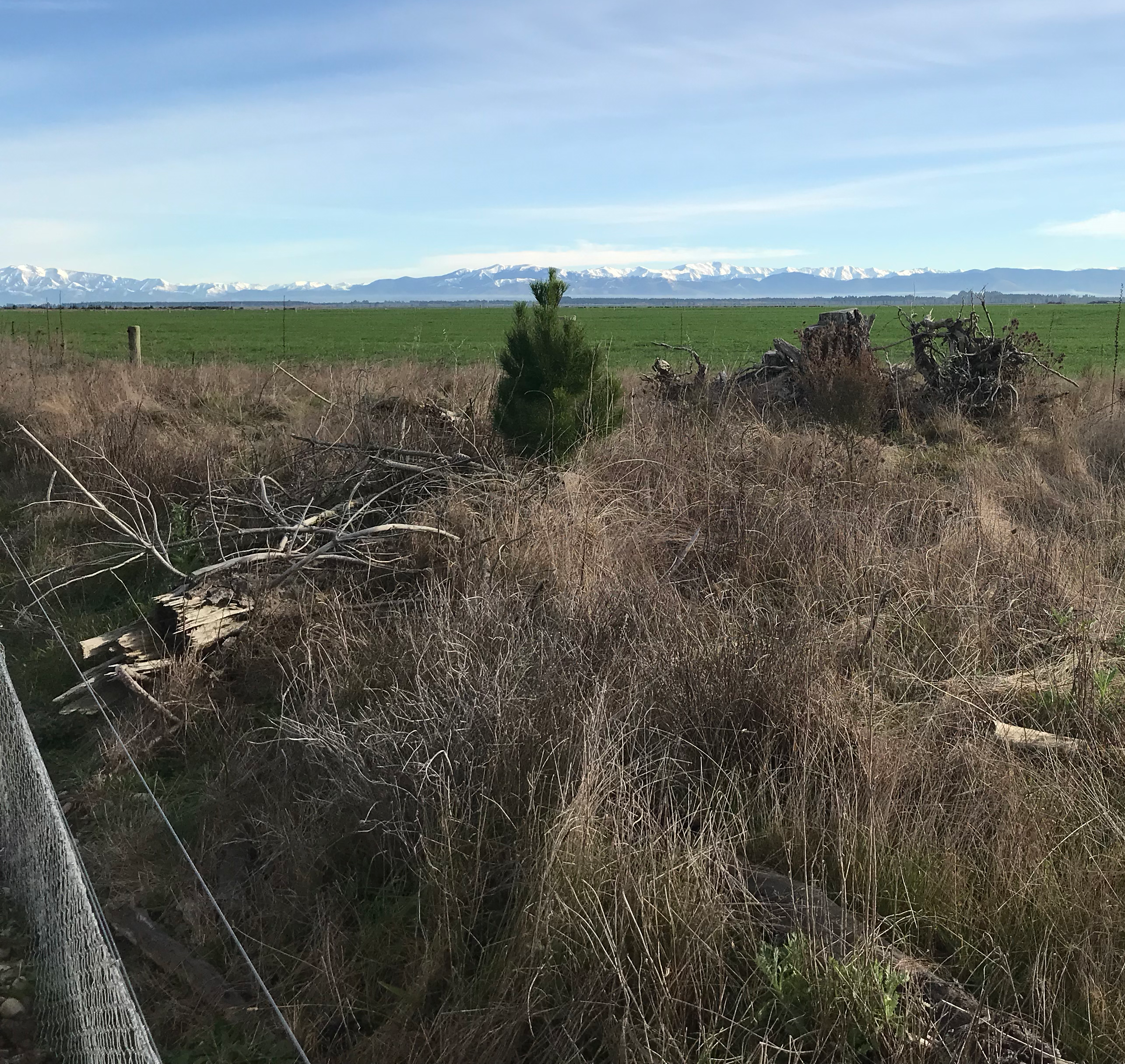

Between 2013 and 2020 Lincoln University surveyed the pasture and remaining forest without finding any Eyrewell beetles. Scientists criticised the decision to convert the forest to dairy farms as "driven by an economic assessment of profitability, with little consideration of biodiversity values." They pointed out that if Ngāi Tahu Farming did not restore kānuka forest or set aside areas of plantation forestry, H. brevicula would soon be extinct. The lead scientist on the study said in November 2018 he was thinking of writing the beetle's obituary.
