= Ashley (New Zealand electorate) =

Ashley was a New Zealand electorate situated north of Christchurch. It was in use from 1866 to 1902, and was replaced with the Hurunui electorate.

== Population centres ==
In the 1865 electoral redistribution, the House of Representatives focussed its review of electorates to South Island electorates only, as the Otago gold rush had caused significant population growth, and a redistribution of the existing population. Fifteen additional South Island electorates were created, including Ashley, and the number of Members of Parliament was increased by 13 to 70.

The Ashley electorate was formed from a corner of Cheviot electorate, and included the towns of Ashley, Amberley, and Oxford. The electorate's boundaries remained roughly the same until the 1881 election, when it expanded slightly into Kaiapoi electorate and Amberley was returned to Cheviot. In the 1887 election, the electorate expanded westwards into Cheviot's southern tip. In the 1890 election, Cheviot itself was abolished, and the majority of its territory was absorbed into Ashley — to compensate, territory was taken from Ashley in the south and given to Kaiapoi. In the 1893 election, Ashley expanded further north, taking the town of Kaikōura from Wairau electorate, but ceded Oxford to Kaiapoi in the south. In the 1902 election, Ashley was dissolved, being replaced with an electorate called Hurunui, covering much the same area.

== History ==
The first representative was Lancelot Walker, who won the 1866 election unopposed. Walker resigned in the following year and was succeeded by Henry Tancred in the 1867 by-election; Tancred was also unopposed. Tancred retired at the end of the parliamentary term in 1870 and was succeeded by John Evans Brown, who won the election against two others. At the 1876 election, Brown was challenged by William Miles Maskell, who had been one of his opponents in 1871, but Brown retained his seat.

For the 1879 election, three candidates contested the election, with William Sefton Moorhouse gaining an absolute majority. The 1881 election was contested by five candidates, with William Fisher Pearson the winner. In the 1884 election, Pearson had a dominant win over one challenger.

In the 1890 election, the electorate was contested by Richard Meredith, James Dupré Lance and John George Knight, who received 648, 611 and 137 votes, respectively. Meredith was thus declared elected.

=== Members of Parliament ===
Key

Independent Liberal

Election	Winner
1866 election	Lancelot Walker
1867 by-election	Henry Tancred
1871 election	John Brown
1876 election	John Brown
1879 election	William Moorhouse
1881 election	William Pearson
1884 election	William Pearson
1887 election	William Pearson
1888 by-election	John Verrall
1890 election	Richard Meredith
1893 election	Richard Meredith
1896 election	Richard Meredith
1899 election	Richard Meredith
(Electorate abolished in 1902; see Hurunui)

== Election results ==
=== 1899 election ===
1899 general election: Ashley
Party	Candidate	Votes	%	±%
Liberal	Richard Meredith	1,943	61.98	+11.34
Conservative	Thomas Caverhill	1,192	38.02	
Majority		751	23.96	+12.87
Turnout		3,135	70.15	−12.51
Registered electors		4,469		

=== 1896 election ===
1896 general election: Ashley
Party	Candidate	Votes	%	±%
Liberal	Richard Meredith	1,700	50.64	−8.20
Conservative	Henry Fear Reece	1,328	39.56	
Liberal	George Renner	329	9.80	
Majority		372	11.08	
Turnout		3,357	82.66	+12.25
Registered electors		4,061		

=== 1893 election ===
1893 general election: Ashley
Party	Candidate	Votes	%	±%
Liberal	Richard Meredith	1,668	58.84	+12.61
Conservative	David Duncan Macfarlane	1,078	38.02	
Liberal	David Dick	89	3.14	
Majority		590	20.81	+18.51
Turnout		2,835	70.42	

=== 1890 election ===
1890 general election: Ashley
Party	Candidate	Votes	%	±%
Liberal	Richard Meredith	643	46.22	
Independent	James Dupré Lance	611	43.92	
Liberal	John George Knight	137	9.84	
Majority		38	2.73	
Turnout		1,391	55.90	
Registered electors		2,488		

=== 1888 by-election ===
1888 Ashley by-election
Party	Candidate	Votes	%	±%
Independent	John Verrall	234	33.86	+21.67
Independent	Alfred Saunders	232	33.57	
Independent	Marmaduke Dixon	225	32.56	
Majority		2	0.29	−27.21
Turnout		691		

=== 1887 election ===
1887 general election: Ashley
Party	Candidate	Votes	%	±%
Independent	William Fisher Pearson	501	57.65	−25.28
Independent	Robert Luke Higgins	262	30.15	
Independent	John Verrall	106	12.20	
Majority		239	27.50	−38.36
Turnout		869	58.96	25.03
Registered electors		1,474		

=== 1884 election ===
1884 general election: Ashley
Party	Candidate	Votes	%	±%
Independent	William Fisher Pearson	413	82.93	+38.01
Independent	Peter Duncan	85	17.07	
Majority		328	65.86	+44.51
Turnout		498	33.92	−25.18
Registered electors		1,468		

=== 1881 election ===
1881 general election: Ashley
Party	Candidate	Votes	%	±%
Independent	William Fisher Pearson	385	44.92	
Independent	James Guild	202	23.57	
Independent	Marmaduke Dixon	158	18.44	
Independent	James Alexander Cunningham	104	12.14	+3.44
Independent	William Patterson	8	0.93	
Majority		183	21.35	11.61
Turnout		857	59.10	
Registered electors		1,450		

=== 1879 election ===
1879 general election: Ashley
Party	Candidate	Votes	%	±%
Independent	William Sefton Moorhouse	337	50.52	
Independent	Walpole Cheshire Fendall	272	40.78	
Independent	James Alexander Cunningham	58	8.70	
Majority		65	9.75	−5.72
Informal votes				
Turnout		686		
Registered electors				

=== 1875–1876 election ===
1875–1876 general election: Ashley
Party	Candidate	Votes	%	±%
Independent	John Evans Brown	265	57.73	+4.30
Independent	William Miles Maskell	194	42.27	+21.33
Majority		71	15.47	−12.34
Turnout		459		
Registered electors				

=== 1871 election ===
1871 general election: Ashley
Party	Candidate	Votes	%	±%
Independent	John Evans Brown	171	53.44	
Independent	Albert Charles Gray	82	25.63	
Independent	William Miles Maskell	67	20.94	
Majority		89	27.81	
Turnout		320		
Registered electors				
