= Marmaduke (surname) =

Marmaduke is a surname. Notable people with the surname include:

- John S. Marmaduke (1833–1887), Confederate major general during the American Civil War and Governor of Missouri, son of Meredith Marmaduke
- Meredith Marmaduke (1791–1864), American politician and Governor of Missouri
- Thomas Marmaduke, early 17th century English explorer, sealer and whaler
