= John Verrall (politician) =

New Zealand politician (1849–1921)

John Miles Verrall (1849 – 17 September 1921), also known as John Miles Verrell, was a 19th-century Member of Parliament in Canterbury, New Zealand. In his later years, he was known throughout the country as an advocate for a state bank.

== Early life ==
Verrall was born in Lewes, Sussex, England, in 1849. He was a tenant farmer in his home country. He married Louisa Waters Aylwin, the daughter of John Aylwin, of Plumpton, Sussex. They emigrated to Queensland, Australia, in 1880, where he ran a cattle station with a partner. After a few years, he left his partner in charge of the cattle station and emigrated to New Zealand.

== New Zealand ==
New Zealand Parliament
Years	Term	Electorate	Party
1888–1890	10th	Ashley	Independent

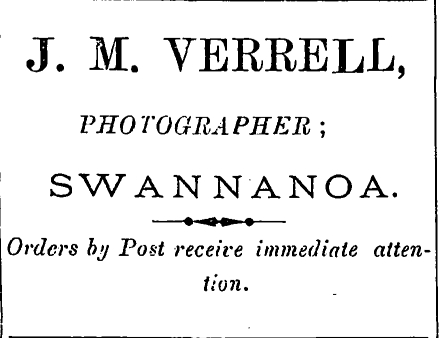
Advertisement placed by Verrall in the Oxford Observer in 1896; note the spelling of his surname

Verrall first settled in Ohoka, where he bought some land. In 1893, he sold up and moved to the nearby Swannanoa. During his time in Swannanoa, he advertised as a photographer using the surname Verrell.

Verrall first stood for election to the House of Representatives in the 1887 election in the Ashley electorate. Of the three candidates, he came last. The successful candidate, William Fisher Pearson, died the following year, and this caused an 1888 by-election. Verrall was one of three candidates, and the result was very tight: he defeated Alfred Saunders by just two votes, and Marmaduke Dixon was only nine votes behind him. He represented the Ashley electorate to the end of the parliamentary term in 1890, when he retired.

He contested the 1899 election in the Kaiapoi electorate, but his candidacy was not taken seriously. As he did not even poll 10% of the vote, he lost his £10 deposit.

He died at his homestead in Swannanoa on 17 September 1921.

New Zealand Parliament
Preceded by William Fisher Pearson	Member of Parliament for Ashley; 1888–1890	Succeeded by Richard Meredith
