= Dixon Peak =

Peak in Aoraki / Mount Cook National Park in New Zealand

Coordinates: 43°33′51.4″S 170°10′53.5″E

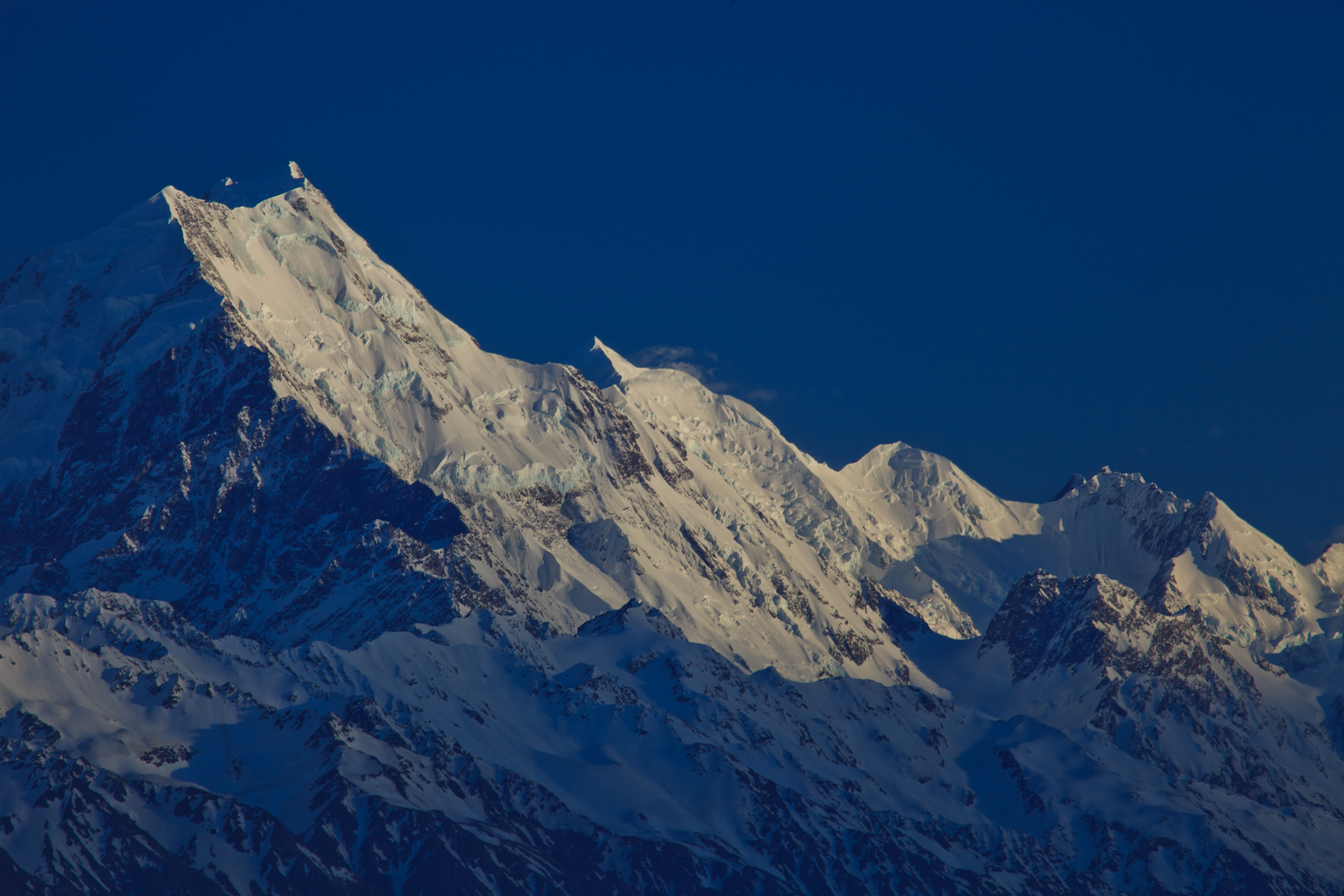
- Dixon Peak

Highest point
- Elevation: 3,004 metres (9,856 ft)
- Prominence: 55 metres (180 ft)

Geography
- Location: South Island, New Zealand
- Parent range: Southern Alps

Climbing
- First ascent: 1931
- Easiest route: basic snow/ice climb via East Ridge

Dixon Peak, previously known as Mount Dixon, is the 23rd highest peak in New Zealand, rising to a height of 3,004 metres (9,856 ft). It is located in the Southern Alps of the South Island in the Mackenzie District, within Aoraki / Mount Cook National Park, and only a short distance from its more illustrious neighbour Aoraki / Mount Cook. The mountain is a popular peak for climbers, and is used as a practice run for ascents of Cook.

Mount Dixon was named by Noel Brodrick for the mountaineer, Marmaduke Dixon (1862–1918).

The mountain should not be confused with Mount Dixon (Grey District), a lower peak of the same name close to the valley of the Taramakau River and near Harper Pass, 100 kilometres (62 mi) to the north east of Dixon Peak.

== See also ==
- List of mountains of New Zealand by height
