= William Fisher Pearson =

New Zealand politician

New Zealand Parliament
Years	Term	Electorate	Party
1881–1884	8th	Ashley	Independent
1884–1887	9th	Ashley	Independent
1887–1888	10th	Ashley	Independent

William Fisher Pearson (1854 – 3 July 1888) was a 19th-century New Zealand Member of Parliament

Pearson was educated at Christ's College, Christchurch. He worked for the Bank of New Zealand for several years. His work there impressed John Coster, who took him to England to help start the New Zealand Shipping Company.

His mother was Sarah Parkinson, a sister of T. H. Parkinson, of Kaituna. His father was pioneer runholder Joseph Pearson (1821–1901), one of the first Pākehā to explore the upper Waimakariri, for whom Lake Pearson is named.

He represented the Ashley electorate from 1881 until his death in 1888. He had been planning to retire at the 1887 election but changed his mind due to pressure from his constituents.

New Zealand Parliament
Preceded by William Sefton Moorhouse	Member of Parliament for Ashley; 1881–1888	Succeeded by John Verrall
