= Marmaduke Dixon (mountaineer) =

New Zealand mountaineer

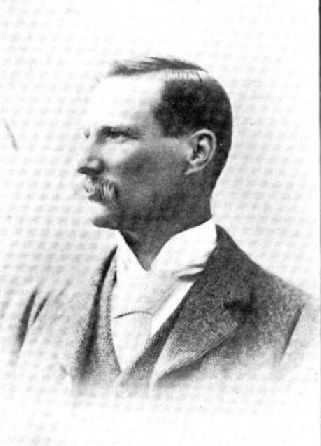
- Dixon some time pre-1903
- Born: Marmaduke John Dixon; 1862; Eyrewell, New Zealand
- Died: 31 July 1918 (aged 55–56); Rangiora, New Zealand
- Education: Christ's College, Christchurch
- Occupation: farmer
- Known for: mountaineering
- Spouse: Mabel Courage (m. 1897)
- Parent: Marmaduke Dixon

Marmaduke John Dixon (1862 – 31 July 1918), known as Marmaduke or Duke Dixon, was a New Zealand farmer and mountaineer.

== Early life and farming ==
Dixon was born in 1862 at his father's station in Eyrewell in North Canterbury, New Zealand. He was the son of Marmaduke Dixon and Eliza Dixon (née Wood). He received his education at Christ's College, Christchurch. Historian George Macdonald described Dixon as "rather eccentric – stammered badly – much loved by his friends".

Dixon took over that part of his father's farm that was located in Eyrewell in the Waimakariri District. His father had been a pioneer in irrigation, and Dixon Jr. further developed the system of land irrigation, chairing the Waimakariri-Ashley water supply board for some years.

== Mountaineering ==
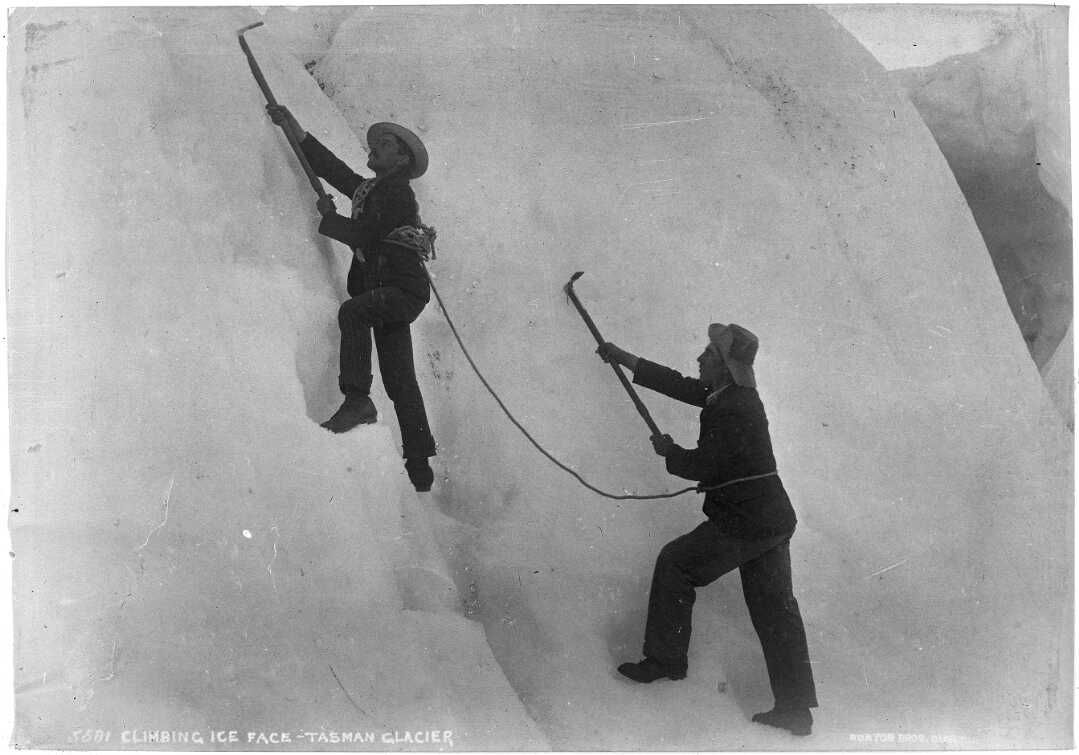
Guy Mannering (left) and Marmaduke Dixon ice-climbing at Onslow Glacier

Dixon was a keen mountaineer. He climbed with Guy Mannering in the Southern Alps and together, they attempted several times to achieve the first ascent of Aoraki / Mount Cook, the country's highest peak. In one of those attempts, they came within 100 feet (30 m) of the summit. Their canoe trip down the Tasman River, across Lake Pukaki, and then down the Waitaki River until they reached the Main South Line so that they could catch a train back to Christchurch inspired adventure sports competitors Steve Moffatt and Steve Gurney to re-enact their climbing and canoeing adventures in 2010. In 1891, Dixon was one of the founders of the New Zealand Alpine Club in Christchurch. Dixon and Mannering sometimes climbed with Percy Johnson, who would in 1892 become Dixon's brother-in-law by marrying Catherine Dixon (Marmaduke's youngest sister).

== Family and death ==
In 1897, Dixon married Mabel Courage at Amberley; they had six children. On 31 July 1918, he died from a recurring illness at Brockelhurst Hospital in Rangiora. Dixon Peak in the Southern Alps, previously known as Mount Dixon, was named after him by Noel Brodrick. Marmaduke Dixon Glacier in the Selwyn District, feeding into the White River, was also named by Brodrick after him.
