= Eyrewell Forest =

Rural area in Canterbury, New Zealand

- Rural area
- Destruction of pine trees at Eyrewell Forest on 1 August 1975
- Interactive map of Eyrewell Forest
- Coordinates: 43.42°S 172.31°E
- Country: New Zealand
- Region: Canterbury
- Territorial authority: Waimakariri District
- Ward: Oxford-Ohoka Ward
- Community: Oxford-Ohoka Community
- Electorates: Waimakariri; Te Tai Tonga (Māori)

Government
  - Territorial Authority: Waimakariri District Council
  - Regional council: Environment Canterbury
  - Mayor of Waimakariri: Dan Gordon
  - Waimakariri MP: Matt Doocey
  - Te Tai Tonga MP: Tākuta Ferris

Area
  - Total: 272.11 km^{2} (105.06 sq mi)

Population (June 2025)
  - Total: 2,080
  - Density: 7.64/km^{2} (19.8/sq mi)
- Time zone: UTC+12 (NZST)
  - Summer (DST): UTC+13 (NZDT)
- Postcode: 7476 and 7495
- Area code: 03
- Local iwi: Ngāi Tahu

Eyrewell Forest is a small rural area in the Waimakariri District, New Zealand.

== Etymology ==
During the 1920s, kānuka was replaced with plantation forestry. The name "Eyre" used for many geographic features in the wider area refers to Edward John Eyre who was Lieutenant-Governor of New Munster Province from 1848 to 1853. Eyrewell was named by an early settler, Marmaduke Dixon, when he found much-needed groundwater on his property. With about half of the area in exotic pines, the "Forest" part of the name derived.

== History ==
The Canterbury Plains were once covered in podocarp-broadleaf forest on good soil and kānuka (Kunzea) scrubland mixed with tōtara on stony soils. After the arrival of Polynesian settlers 750 years ago much of this was burned, with less than 0.5% of the original vegetation remaining today. Only some small remnants of kānuka forest survive, including 2.4 ha at Eyrewell Scientific Reserve. Eyrewell Forest was Crown Land, administered by the New Zealand Forest Service; it was purchased from Ngāi Tahu in 1848 as part of the £2000 Kemp's Deed of 8 million ha.

Because of Canterbury's lack of native forest the government in the early 1900s planted exotic forests throughout North Canterbury, including at Eyrewell. The poor soil at Eyrewell was considered unsuitable for agriculture and used mainly for sheep farming. Between 1928 and 1932, the 30 foot (9.1 m) tall mānuka (Leptospermum scoparium) forest at Eyrewell was cleared and the 6764 ha Eyrewell Forest plantation of introduced Monterey pine (Pinus radiata) was established. Most of the area has been in plantation forestry ever since, with blocks of trees being felled in rotation approximately every 27 years. The soil at Eyrewell Forest is very thin and stony, and on 1 August 1975 much of the Pinus radiata plantation was blown over by strong north-westerly winds.

The area's 6700 ha pine plantation was the only place on earth where the critically endangered Eyrewell ground beetle had ever been found. Some of the older blocks had an understory of kānuka up to 4 m high and most included native shrubs, herbs, and mosses, despite regular tree felling and replanting. In 2000 the land was returned to Ngāi Tūāhuriri, a subtribe of Ngāi Tahu, as part of the 1998 Treaty of Waitangi settlement. Despite protests by the Department of Conservation, 1200 ha was converted into three trial irrigated dairy farms, now known as Te Whenua Hou (The New Land) and managed by Ngāi Tahu Farming. Six farms were later established as forestry licenses expired, then a seventh. In 2016 it was announced the Eyrewell Forest would be completely felled and converted into 8,500 ha of pivot-irrigated pasture to support 14,000 dairy cows in 13 farms and 7 dairy support farms, with almost all the forest to be cleared by 2017/2018. Repeated searches following forest clearance failed to find any Eyrewell ground beetles, and they were considered extinct as a result.

There has also been considerable concern over the large environmental impact of intensive dairy farming, considering the area's proximity to the Waimakariri River and its dry conditions. In August 2022 Ngāi Tahu Farming partnered with the Ministry for Primary Industries to begin Te Whenua Hou Te Whenua Whitiora, a seven-year, $11.5 million trial of regenerative farming, running side-by-side with traditional dairy farming. This was in response to learning the "very poor soils" under the recently felled plantation were not able to support the intensive dairy farming that had been planned. In Ngāi Tahu's 2025 High Court case over freshwater management, it was revealed that the regenerative farming project was producing nitrate contamination in groundwater of 2–4 mg/l, and possibly higher, exceeding the 1 mg/l recommended by freshwater ecologist Mike Joy.

== Demographics ==
The Eyrewell statistical area covers 272.11 km^{2} (105.06 sq mi). It had an estimated population of 2,080 as of June 2025, with a population density of 7.6 people per km^{2}.

Historical population
Year	Pop.	±% p.a.
2006	918	—
2013	1,521	+7.48%
2018	1,806	+3.49%
2023	1,947	+1.51%

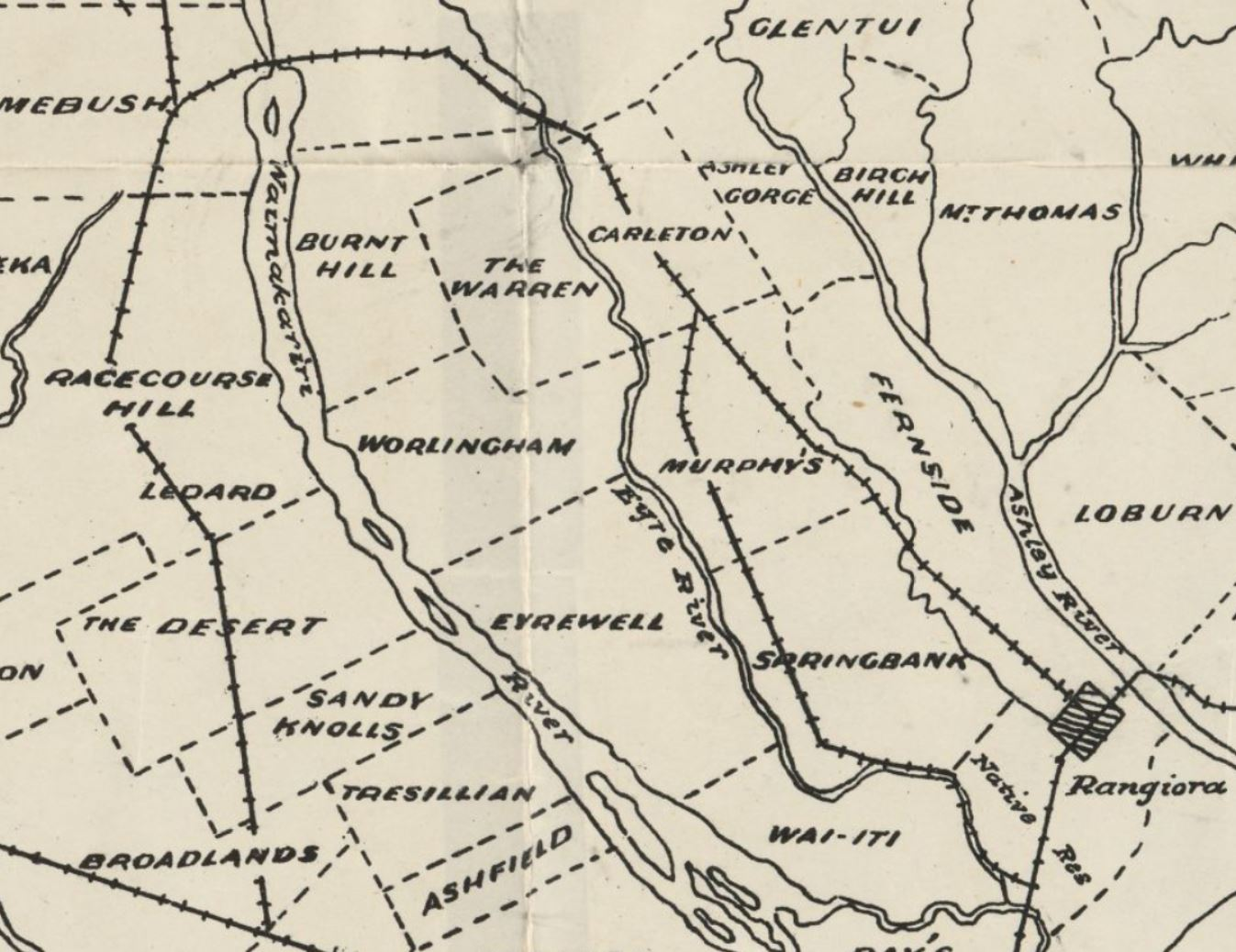
Stations around Eyrewell in 1930

Eyrewell had a population of 1,947 in the 2023 New Zealand census, an increase of 141 people (7.8%) since the 2018 census, and an increase of 426 people (28.0%) since the 2013 census. There were 999 males, 936 females, and 15 people of other genders in 690 dwellings. 2.2% of people identified as LGBTIQ+. The median age was 40.7 years (compared with 38.1 years nationally). There were 384 people (19.7%) aged under 15 years, 300 (15.4%) aged 15 to 29, 1,038 (53.3%) aged 30 to 64, and 228 (11.7%) aged 65 or older.

People could identify as more than one ethnicity. The results were 89.7% European (Pākehā); 8.9% Māori; 1.2% Pasifika; 7.2% Asian; 0.8% Middle Eastern, Latin American and African New Zealanders (MELAA); and 3.4% other, which includes people giving their ethnicity as "New Zealander". English was spoken by 97.5%, Māori by 1.1%, and other languages by 9.7%. No language could be spoken by 2.2% (e.g. too young to talk). New Zealand Sign Language was known by 0.5%. The percentage of people born overseas was 23.6, compared with 28.8% nationally.

Religious affiliations were 27.3% Christian, 0.3% Hindu, 0.3% Islam, 0.2% Buddhist, 0.6% New Age, 0.2% Jewish, and 1.4% other religions. People who answered that they had no religion were 59.8%, and 10.0% of people did not answer the census question.

Of those at least 15 years old, 318 (20.3%) people had a bachelor's or higher degree, 921 (58.9%) had a post-high school certificate or diploma, and 321 (20.5%) people exclusively held high school qualifications. The median income was $49,400, compared with $41,500 nationally. 210 people (13.4%) earned over $100,000 compared to 12.1% nationally. The employment status of those at least 15 was 909 (58.2%) full-time, 240 (15.4%) part-time, and 24 (1.5%) unemployed.

== Climate ==
The average temperature in summer is 16.2 °C, and in winter is 5.9 °C.

Month	Normal temperature
January	16.8 °C
February	16.3 °C
March	14.6 °C
April	11.6 °C
May	8.3 °C
June	5.8 °C
July	5.3 °C
August	6.5 °C
September	8.9 °C
October	11.2 °C
November	13.3 °C
December	15.5 °C

Climate data for Eyrewell Forest (1981–2010)
Month	Jan	Feb	Mar	Apr	May	Jun	Jul	Aug	Sep	Oct	Nov	Dec	Year
Mean daily maximum °C (°F)	23.3 (73.9)	22.5 (72.5)	20.7 (69.3)	18.0 (64.4)	14.2 (57.6)	11.8 (53.2)	10.7 (51.3)	12.4 (54.3)	14.9 (58.8)	17.0 (62.6)	19.3 (66.7)	21.3 (70.3)	17.2 (62.9)
Daily mean °C (°F)	16.9 (62.4)	16.2 (61.2)	14.4 (57.9)	11.7 (53.1)	8.7 (47.7)	6.1 (43.0)	5.3 (41.5)	6.8 (44.2)	9.0 (48.2)	11.0 (51.8)	13.1 (55.6)	15.3 (59.5)	11.2 (52.2)
Mean daily minimum °C (°F)	10.6 (51.1)	10.0 (50.0)	8.1 (46.6)	5.3 (41.5)	3.1 (37.6)	0.4 (32.7)	0.0 (32.0)	1.1 (34.0)	3.0 (37.4)	5.1 (41.2)	6.9 (44.4)	9.2 (48.6)	5.2 (41.4)
Average rainfall mm (inches)	56.8 (2.24)	54.4 (2.14)	71.9 (2.83)	59.1 (2.33)	69.5 (2.74)	60.2 (2.37)	76.9 (3.03)	76.4 (3.01)	56.7 (2.23)	79.4 (3.13)	51.0 (2.01)	66.5 (2.62)	778.8 (30.68)
Source: NIWA (rain 1971–2000)
