= Waikato (electorate) =

- Single-member general constituency for the New Zealand House of Representatives
- Interactive map of boundaries from the 2026 election
- Formation: 1871, 1969, 2008
- Region: Waikato
- Character: Suburban
- Term: 3 years

Member for Waikato
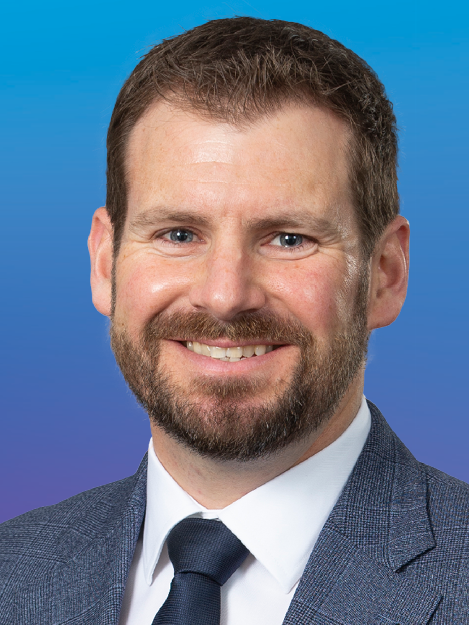
- Tim van de Molen since 23 September 2017
- Party: National
- Previous MP: Lindsay Tisch (National)
Party vote distribution

Waikato is an electorate in the New Zealand Parliament. A Waikato electorate was first created in 1871 and an electorate by this name has existed from 1871 to 1963, 1969 to 1996, and 2008 to the present, though exact borders have often changed.

The Waikato electorate is represented by Tim van de Molen for the National Party, who has held the seat since the 2017 general election.

== Geography ==
Map of boundaries at the 2020 and 2023 general elections

The Waikato electorate, whose borders were last altered in 2020, is in the Waikato region and includes largely rural areas to the north and the west of the city of Hamilton. The Waikato River flows along near its southern boundary then travels north through the electorate. It includes small portions of the outskirts of Hamilton and Cambridge. Towns within the electorate include Morrinsville, Huntly, and Matamata, each of which have populations around 8,000.

In a piece for the 2020 election, journalist Tom Rowland described the area as "one of the country's most vital regions, home to farmers and agricultural industries that continue to hold New Zealand's economy steady in the wake of the Covid-19 pandemic". Rowland considered it to be a key area for future economic development, calling it "the key to activating the Golden Triangle between Auckland, Hamilton and Tauranga." He also noted that it was the birthplace of both Jacinda Ardern and Judith Collins, the Prime Minister and the Leader of the Opposition, respectively, at the 2020 election.

== History ==
=== Creation and seat holders prior to 1938 ===
The Waikato electorate was first contested in the 1871 election. James McPherson was elected, but he resigned the same year, on 20 December. William Jackson won the resulting 1872 by-election. Jackson retired at the end of the parliamentary term in 1875. Frederick Whitaker won 5 January 1876 election. In the 1879 election, Whitaker contested the Eden electorate but was beaten by Joseph Tole.

The Waikato electorate was won by John Blair Whyte in the 1879 election, who served for eleven years until 1890 when he retired. Whyte was appointed to the Legislative Council in the following year. John Bryce, who first became Member of the House of Representatives during the 4th Parliament, succeeded Whyte in the 1890 election, but he resigned in the following year. The resulting 1891 by-election was won by Edward Lake, who retired at the end of the parliamentary term in 1893.

The 1893 election was won by Alfred Cadman for the Liberal Party, who had been an MP in various electorates since 1881. At the next election in 1896, Cadman successfully contested the Ohinemuri electorate. The Waikato electorate was won by Frederic Lang in 1896, who represented the electorate until his defeat by the Liberal Party's Henry Greenslade in the 1905 election. Greenslade held the electorate until 1911, when he was defeated by the Reform candidate Alexander Young.

Young won subsequent elections in 1914 and 1919. In the 1922 election, he successfully contested the newly formed Hamilton electorate. Young was succeeded by the Liberal candidate Frederick Lye in the Waikato electorate in 1922. At the 1925 election, Lye was defeated by Reform's Daniel Stewart Reid. Lye in turn defeated Reid at the 1928 election, but this time standing for the United Party. The United–Reform Coalition was established just before the 1931 election and Lye was again successful. In the 1935 election, Lye was beaten by Robert Coulter of the Labour Party. Coulter served only one term in Waikato, as he was defeated by the National Party candidate Stan Goosman in the 1938 election.

=== 1938 onward ===
Since 1938, the Waikato electorate (when it has existed) has always been held by a National Party member. This trend has lasted through 2020, when the seat was retained by National MP Tim van de Molen. Other electorates which covered parts of this region have also strongly supported National. The electorates of Piako, Matamata, and Karapiro were entirely National-held during their time as electorates, the Hamilton electorate was held by National from 1943 until it was dissolved in 1969, and the Waipa electorate was held by National from 1954 until its dissolution in 1996.

Goosman, who had taken Waikato in 1938, also won the 1943 election, but successfully contested the 1946 election in the newly formed Piako electorate. Goosman was succeeded in Waikato by Geoffrey Sim in 1946. Sim held the electorate until it was abolished in 1963, when he contested Piako instead.

The Waikato electorate was re-established in 1969 following the Electoral Act of 1965, which led to substantial changes in the number, shape, and size of electorates across the country. These changes came into effect with the 1969 election. The first representative was National's Lance Adams-Schneider, who had previously represented the Hamilton electorate. Adams-Schneider retired from Parliament in 1981 and became Ambassador of New Zealand to the United States in the following year. Adams-Schneider was succeeded by National's Simon Upton, who won the 1981 election and started his long parliamentary career with one term in Waikato. Upton contested the Raglan in the 1984 election and was succeeded by National's Rob Storey in Waikato. Storey held the electorate until it was abolished again in the electorate changes that came with the introduction of Mixed-member proportional voting in 1996.

The Waikato electorate was re-established in 2006 for the 2008 election.

Lindsay Tisch, who had been the MP for Piako since 2002, won Waikato at the 2008 election. Tisch retained his seat in the 2011 election and the 2014 election, but he announced he would not stand for the 2017 general election. The seat was won by Tim van de Molen, retaining it for the National Party, who won it again in 2020.

The most recent boundary changes to Waikato occurred in 2020, when more area was added in its north and its south, as well as areas just outside Hamilton and Cambridge.

Three of the five National Party members of parliament for Waikato were cabinet ministers.

=== Members of Parliament ===
Key

Independent Conservative Liberal Reform United Labour National

Election	Winner
1871 election	James McPherson
1872 by-election	William Jackson
1876 election	Frederick Whitaker
1879 election	John Blair Whyte
1881 election	John Blair Whyte
1884 election	John Blair Whyte
1887 election	John Blair Whyte
1890 election	John Bryce
1891 by-election	Edward Lake
1893 election	Alfred Cadman
1896 election	Frederic Lang
1899 election	Frederic Lang
1902 election	Frederic Lang
1905 election	Henry Greenslade
1908 election	Henry Greenslade
1911 election	Alexander Young
1914 election	Alexander Young
1919 election	Alexander Young
1922 election	Frederick Lye
1925 election	Stewart Reid
1928 election	Frederick Lye (2nd term)
1931 election	Frederick Lye (2nd term)
1935 election	Robert Coulter
1938 election	Stan Goosman
1943 election	Stan Goosman
1946 election	Geoffrey Sim
1949 election	Geoffrey Sim
1951 election	Geoffrey Sim
1954 election	Geoffrey Sim
1957 election	Geoffrey Sim
1960 election	Geoffrey Sim
(Electorate abolished 1963–1969)
1969 election	Lance Adams-Schneider
1972 election	Lance Adams-Schneider
1975 election	Lance Adams-Schneider
1978 election	Lance Adams-Schneider
1981 election	Simon Upton
1984 election	Rob Storey
1987 election	Rob Storey
1990 election	Rob Storey
1993 election	Rob Storey
(Electorate abolished 1996–2008)
2008 election	Lindsay Tisch
2011 election	Lindsay Tisch
2014 election	Lindsay Tisch
2017 election	Tim van de Molen
2020 election	Tim van de Molen
2023 election	Tim van de Molen

=== List MPs ===
Members of Parliament elected from party lists in elections where that person also unsuccessfully contested the Waikato electorate. Unless otherwise stated, all MPs terms began and ended at general elections.

Election	Winner
2008 election	Jacinda Ardern
2011 election	Barbara Stewart
2014 election	Barbara Stewart
2020 election	James McDowall

== Election results ==
=== 2026 election ===
The next election will be held on 7 November 2026. Candidates for Waikato are listed at Candidates in the 2026 New Zealand general election by electorate § Waikato. Official results will be available after 27 November 2026.

=== 2023 election ===
2023 general election: Waikato
Notes:	Blue background denotes the winner of the electorate vote. Pink background denotes a candidate elected from their party list. Yellow background denotes an electorate win by a list member, or other incumbent. A ✓ or ✗ denotes status of any incumbent, win or lose respectively.						
Party	Candidate	Votes	%	±%	Party votes	%	±%
National	✓ Tim van de Molen	27,445	64.43	+12.46	21,749	50.17	+12.45
Labour	Jamie Toko	8,897	20.88	–18.10	7,612	17.56	–21.92
NZ First	Stu Husband	3,587	8.42	–	3,319	7.65	+4.94
Opportunities	Megan Owen	1,548	3.63	–	742	1.71	+0.45
Vision NZ	Lois Dornan	420	0.98	–			
ACT					5,249	12.11	+1.59
Green					2,376	5.48	+1.96
NZ Loyal					721	1.66	–
Te Pāti Māori					415	0.95	+0.60
NewZeal					238	0.54	+0.33
Legalise Cannabis					190	0.43	+0.01
Freedoms NZ					142	0.32	–
New Conservatives					102	0.23	–2.32
DemocracyNZ					86	0.19	–
Animal Justice					77	0.17	–
Women's Rights					36	0.08	–
Leighton Baker Party					28	0.06	–
New Nation					19	0.04	–
Informal votes		694			196		
Total valid votes		42,591			43,342		
National hold	Majority	18,548	43.54	+30.85			

=== 2020 election ===
2020 general election: Waikato
Notes:	Blue background denotes the winner of the electorate vote. Pink background denotes a candidate elected from their party list. Yellow background denotes an electorate win by a list member, or other incumbent. A ✓ or ✗ denotes status of any incumbent, win or lose respectively.						
Party	Candidate	Votes	%	±%	Party votes	%	±%
National	✓ Tim van de Molen	20,877	51.97	−10.21	15,562	37.72	−20.97
Labour	Kerrin Leoni	15,661	38.98	+15.92	16,288	39.48	+15.30
ACT	James McDowall	2,084	5.19	—	4,340	10.52	+9.88
New Conservative	Caleb Ansell	1,551	3.86	—	1,053	2.55	+2.25
Green					1,454	3.52	+0.47
NZ First					1,117	2.71	−7.39
Opportunities					518	1.26	−0.60
Advance NZ					373	0.90	—
Legalise Cannabis					173	0.42	+0.07
Māori Party					145	0.35	−0.08
ONE					87	0.21	—
Vision NZ					46	0.11	—
Outdoors					30	0.07	−0.01
Sustainable NZ					20	0.05	—
Social Credit					19	0.05	+0.01
Heartland					16	0.04	—
TEA					13	0.03	—
Informal votes		933			263		
Total valid votes		41,106			41,517		
National hold	Majority	5,216	12.69	−25.90			

=== 2017 election ===
2017 general election: Waikato
Notes:	Blue background denotes the winner of the electorate vote. Pink background denotes a candidate elected from their party list. Yellow background denotes an electorate win by a list member, or other incumbent. A ✓ or ✗ denotes status of any incumbent, win or lose respectively.						
Party	Candidate	Votes	%	±%	Party votes	%	±%
National	Tim van de Molen	24,560	61.33	−3.56	23,891	58.48	−1.51
Labour	Brooke Loader	9,108	22.74	+3.65	9,844	24.1	+9.73
NZ First	Stu Husband	3,716	9.28	−0.15	4,112	10.07	−0.68
Green	Philippa Stevenson	2,113	5.28	—	1,240	3.04	−2.72
Opportunities					759	1.86	—
ACT					261	0.64	+0.11
Māori Party					177	0.43	−0.11
Legalise Cannabis					142	0.35	−0.15
Conservative					123	0.3	−5.4
Ban 1080					58	0.14	−0.11
Outdoors					32	0.08	—
United Future					26	0.06	−0.16
People's Party					18	0.04	—
Democrats					15	0.04	−0.07
Mana					5	0.01	−0.48 (Note: 2017 Mana Party swing is relative to the votes for Internet-Mana in 2014; it shared a party list with the Internet Party in the 2014 election)
Internet					4	0.01	−0.48 (Note: 2017 Internet Party swing is relative to the votes for Internet-Mana in 2014; it shared a party list with Mana Party in the 2014 election)
Informal votes		548			146		
Total valid votes		40,045			40,853		
National hold	Majority	15,452	38.59	−7.2			

=== 2014 election ===
2014 general election: Waikato
Notes:	Blue background denotes the winner of the electorate vote. Pink background denotes a candidate elected from their party list. Yellow background denotes an electorate win by a list member, or other incumbent. A ✓ or ✗ denotes status of any incumbent, win or lose respectively.						
Party	Candidate	Votes	%	±%	Party votes	%	±%
National	✓ Lindsay Tisch	22,911	64.89	−0.01	21,598	59.99	+0.01
Labour	Christine Greer	6,742	19.09	+0.69	5,303	14.73	−1.71
NZ First	Barbara Stewart	3,330	9.43	+4.28	3,870	10.75	+2.65
Conservative	Brian Dobbs	1,442	4.08	+0.34	2,053	5.70	+1.62
ACT	Mike Burrow	290	0.82	−0.91	191	0.53	−1.40
Democrats	Katherine Ransom	172	0.49	+0.14	38	0.11	−0.02
Green					2,075	5.76	−1.26
Māori Party					196	0.54	−0.05
Legalise Cannabis					180	0.50	−0.04
Internet Mana					178	0.49	+0.20
Ban 1080					89	0.25	+0.25
United Future					78	0.22	−0.55
Independent Coalition					10	0.03	+0.03
Civilian					8	0.02	+0.02
Focus					6	0.02	+0.02
Informal votes		421			127		
Total valid votes		35,308			36,000		
National hold	Majority	16,169	45.79	−0.71			

=== 2011 election ===
2011 general election: Waikato
Notes:	Blue background denotes the winner of the electorate vote. Pink background denotes a candidate elected from their party list. Yellow background denotes an electorate win by a list member, or other incumbent. A ✓ or ✗ denotes status of any incumbent, win or lose respectively.						
Party	Candidate	Votes	%	±%	Party votes	%	±%
National	✓ Lindsay Tisch	19,817	64.90	+1.47	18,875	59.98	+2.54
Labour	Kate Sutton	5,619	18.40	−4.52	5,173	16.44	−6.13
Green	Cameron Harper	1,970	6.45	+1.77	2,208	7.02	+3.08
NZ First	Barbara Stewart	1,571	5.15	+0.88	2,549	8.10	+2.81
Conservative	Brian Dobbs	1,142	3.74	+3.74	1,284	4.08	+4.08
ACT	Robin Boom	307	1.01	−2.43	607	1.93	−4.54
Democrats	John Pemberton	107	0.35	−0.03	41	0.13	+0.01
United Future					243	0.77	−0.11
Māori Party					186	0.59	−0.14
Legalise Cannabis					170	0.54	+0.16
Mana					91	0.29	+0.29
Libertarianz					28	0.09	+0.04
Alliance					12	0.04	−0.04
Informal votes		775			298		
Total valid votes		30,533			31,467		
National hold	Majority	14,198	46.50	+5.99			

Electorate (as at 26 November 2011): 42,084

=== 2008 election ===
2008 general election: Waikato
Notes:	Blue background denotes the winner of the electorate vote. Pink background denotes a candidate elected from their party list. Yellow background denotes an electorate win by a list member, or other incumbent. A ✓ or ✗ denotes status of any incumbent, win or lose respectively.						
Party	Candidate	Votes	%	±%	Party votes	%	±%
National	✓ Lindsay Tisch	20,122	63.44		18,532	57.45	
Labour	Jacinda Ardern	7,272	22.93		7,280	22.57	
Green	Wendy Harper	1,484	4.68		1,271	3.94	
NZ First	Barbara Stewart	1,353	4.27		1,708	5.29	
ACT	Mark Davies	1,089	3.43		2,088	6.47	
Kiwi	James Ross	278	0.88		171	0.53	
Democrats	John Pemberton	122	0.38		40	0.12	
United Future					285	0.88	
Māori Party					235	0.73	
Bill and Ben					195	0.60	
Progressive					188	0.58	
Legalise Cannabis					123	0.38	
Family Party					87	0.27	
Alliance					25	0.08	
Libertarianz					15	0.05	
Workers Party					8	0.02	
Pacific					4	0.01	
RAM					3	0.01	
RONZ					1	0.003	
Informal votes		245			107		
Total valid votes		31,720			32,259		
National win new seat	Majority	12,850	40.51				

=== 1935 election ===
1935 general election: Waikato
Party	Candidate	Votes	%	±%
Labour	Robert Coulter	4,258	44.01	
United	Frederick Lye	3,474	35.90	−20.95
Country Party	Solomon Netheim Ziman (Note: Ziman was the father of John Ziman)	1,221	12.62	−30.53
Democrat	Dr. H E Annett	722	7.46	
Informal votes		155	1.60	+0.69
Majority		784	8.10	
Turnout		9,675	87.38	+9.46
Registered electors		11,072		

Table footnotes:

=== 1931 election ===
1931 general election: Waikato
Party	Candidate	Votes	%	±%
United	Frederick Lye	4,072	56.85	
Country Party	Solomon Netheim Ziman (Note: Ziman was the father of John Ziman)	3,091	43.15	
Majority		981	13.70	
Informal votes		66	0.91	
Turnout		7,229	77.92	
Registered electors		9,277		

Table footnotes:

=== 1928 election ===
1928 general election: Waikato
Party	Candidate	Votes	%	±%
United	Frederick Lye	2,979	38.34	
Reform	Stewart Reid	2,893	37.24	
Country Party	Patrick Keegan	1,897	24.42	
Majority		86	1.11	
Informal votes		70	0.89	
Turnout		7,839	85.04	
Registered electors		9,218		

=== 1908 election ===
1908 general election: Waikato, first ballot
Party	Candidate	Votes	%	±%
Liberal	Henry Greenslade	3,305	54.03	
Conservative	Allen Bell	2,812	45.97	
Majority		493	8.06	
Turnout		6,117	83.01	
Registered electors		7,369		

=== 1899 election ===
1899 general election: Waikato
Party	Candidate	Votes	%	±%
Conservative	Frederic Lang	2,337	53.70	
Liberal	John Hosking	2,015	46.30	
Majority		322	7.40	
Turnout		4,352	82.39	
Registered electors		5,282		

=== 1891 by-election ===
1891 Waikato by-election
Party	Candidate	Votes	%	±%
Independent	Edward Lake	697	60.14	
Independent	William Murray	462	39.86	
Majority		235	20.28	
Informal votes		10	0.86	
Turnout		1,169	52.28	

== Bibliography ==
- McRobie, Alan (1989). Electoral Atlas of New Zealand. Wellington: GP Books. ISBN 0-477-01384-8.
- Mansfield, F. W. (1909). The General Election, 1908. National Library.
- Scholefield, Guy (1950) [First ed. published 1913]. New Zealand Parliamentary Record, 1840–1949 (3rd ed.). Wellington: Govt. Printer.
- Wilson, Jim (1985) [First ed. published 1913]. New Zealand Parliamentary Record, 1840–1984 (4th ed.). Wellington: V.R. Ward, Govt. Printer. OCLC 154283103.
