= Plugge =

Plugge is a surname. Notable people with the surname include:

- Arthur Plugge (1877–1934), New Zealand soldier who fought in World War I
  - Plugge's Plateau Commonwealth War Graves Commission Cemetery
- Kim Plugge (born 1975), Swiss rower
- Leonard Plugge (1889–1981), British businessman and politician
