= Samuel Jackson (lawyer) =

New Zealand lawyer (1831–1913)

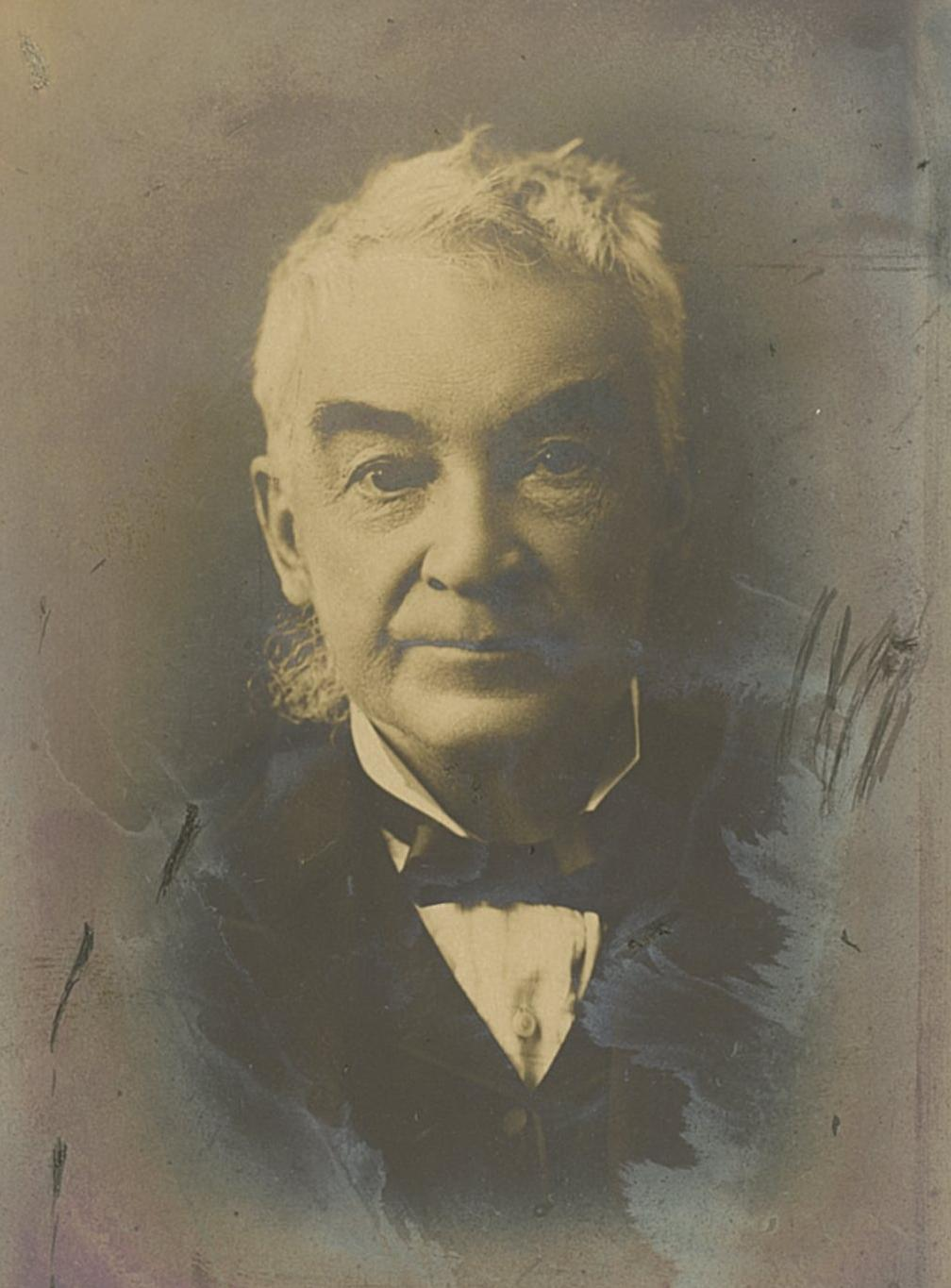
- Portrait of Samuel Jackson
- Born: 16 April 1831; Providence Green, Green Hammerton, Yorkshire, England
- Died: 29 July 1913 (aged 82); Remuera, Auckland, New Zealand
- Occupations: attorney and solicitor
- Known for: 'father' of the legal profession in Auckland
- Relatives: Hughlings Jackson (brother); William Jackson (brother)

Samuel Jackson (16 April 1831 – 29 July 1913) was a solicitor in Auckland, New Zealand. He worked in his profession until shortly before his death and was at the time the oldest practising solicitor in the country, and was regarded as the father of his profession in his city. He joined the solicitor Frederick Merriman and they called their firm Merriman & Jackson. Upon Merriman's death in 1865, he took on a new partner and the firm was renamed Jackson Russell, by which name it is still known today. In his younger years, he was involved in provincial politics.

== Early life ==
Jackson was born in 1831 in Providence Green, Green Hammerton, near Harrogate, Yorkshire, England. He was the son of Samuel Jackson (1806–1858), a brewer and yeoman who owned and farmed his land, and Sarah Jackson (née Hughlings; 1807/08–1836), the daughter of a Welsh revenue collector. His mother died when he was five. He had three brothers and a sister; all but his youngest brother emigrated to New Zealand.

His parents had married on 24 March 1828. His oldest sibling was his sister Ann (30 April 1829 – 9 August 1859). She died three days after giving birth to her first child. He himself was the oldest of the brothers and he was born on 16 April 1831, and baptised a month later on 24 May. His brother William was the third of the children; he was born on 11 October 1832 and baptised a month later on 12 November. Thomas (2 December 1833 – 15 November 1906) was the next sibling. He became a mariner and also emigrated to New Zealand. His youngest brother, John (4 April 1835 – 7 October 1911), remained in England and became a prominent neurologist.

Jackson studied law at the University of York, then joined the Inner Temple and was called to the bar in 1853. He emigrated to New Zealand in 1855 on the Merchantman and arrived in Auckland from Plymouth on 4 September 1855. Amongst the other passengers was the family of Reverend James Mandeno. He married Sarah Anne Mandeno, the eldest daughter of the family, on 26 August 1856.

== Political career ==
On 8 April 1864, John Anderson Gilfillan and Jackson were appointed to the Executive Council of the Auckland Provincial Council; they replaced William Daldy and Joseph May. Whilst Gilfillan had previously been a provincial councillor as well as a member of the executive council, neither of them were provincial councillors at that time, and Jackson was never an elected member. The source does not state an end date for Jackson's membership of the executive council. From 21 July to 12 October 1865, Jackson was the 5th Deputy-Superintendent of Auckland Province.

== Professional career ==
Within two weeks of arriving, Jackson made the necessary declaration and was admitted as an attorney and solicitor of the Supreme Court. Within a short time, he worked in the office of the solicitor Frederick Merriman. In July 1856, the first advertisement of 'Merriman & Jackson' appeared in the Daily Southern Cross, the largest Auckland newspaper at that time.

Upon Merriman's death in 1865, the firm was joined by James Russell and was renamed Jackson Russell. James Russell retired from the firm about 1903 on the death of his brother, Thomas Russell, who had been Chairman of Directors of the Waihi mine. Jackson had a long and distinguished legal career, and gained the respect of the whole profession. He practised until approximately a year before his death and was thus active in his profession in New Zealand for over 55 years, which made him the oldest practising solicitor in New Zealand at that point. He became generally regarded as the father of the profession in Auckland. His firm is still known as Jackson Russell today.

During his career, Jackson advised many rich benefactors regarding their bequests. When John Edward Elam came to see him about a suitable cause to leave his estate to, Jackson suggested that a school that teaches fine art was needed. As a result, the Elam School of Fine Arts was set up. Edward Costley had no relatives, so proposed to leave his wealth to Jackson and his children, to which Jackson replied: "I'm cosy. Leave it to Auckland." Seven charities benefited from Costley's estate, and one of the buildings at Green Lane Hospital came from this. Another case was James Dilworth, who bequeathed the bulk of his estate to the Dilworth Ulster Institute Trust, which established Dilworth School with this funding.

== Family ==
Since his marriage in 1856, Jackson lived at Orakei Road, Remuera. Before trams were introduced, he walked to his office in downtown Auckland on a daily basis, a distance of 4 miles (6.4 km) each way.

Their first child was christened Samuel, and he was sent to England for his secondary education and to study law. Samuel Jackson Jr. joined the legal profession in Auckland, but emigrated to Oakland, California, USA, in 1890. A further son, born in 1870, was christened John Hughlings.

Jackson died on 29 July 1913 at his residence and was survived by his wife and several children: Samuel Jackson (by then living in San Francisco), John Hughlings and G. J. Jackson (auctioneers in Auckland under the name T. Mandeno Jackson), Thornton Jackson LLB (employed at Jackson and Russell), Mrs A. Blair (of Wellington), Mrs W. Madill (of Auckland), Miss Ruth Jackson, Mrs Proude (of Auckland), H. Hughlings Jackson (Chief Mechanical Engineer at the New Zealand Railways Department), and Mrs Andrew Hanna (of Auckland). His son Thomas Mandeno Jackson, the founder of the auctioneering business, had died five years before him. At the time of his death, he had 23 grandchildren.

== Bibliography ==
- Critchley, Macdonald; Critchley, Eileen A. (1998). John Hughlings Jackson : Father of English Neurology (PDF). Oxford University Press.
- Scholefield, Guy (1950) [First ed. published 1913]. New Zealand Parliamentary Record, 1840–1949 (3rd ed.). Wellington: Govt. Printer.
