= 1891 Waikato by-election =

New Zealand by-election

The 1891 Waikato by-election was a by-election held on 6 October 1891 during the 11th New Zealand Parliament in the Waikato electorate of Waikato.

The by-election was caused by the resignation of the incumbent MP John Bryce.

The by-election was won by Edward Lake, who beat former MP William Murray.

== Results ==
1891 Waikato by-election
Party	Candidate	Votes	%	±%
Independent	Edward Lake	697	60.14	
Independent	William Murray	462	39.86	
Majority		235	20.28	
Informal votes		10	0.86	
Turnout		1,169	52.28	
