= Jack Luxton =

New Zealand farmer and politician (1923–2005)

John Finlay Luxton QSO (14 August 1923 – 29 August 2005) was a New Zealand dairy farmer and politician. He was a Member of Parliament for the National Party from 1966 to 1987.

== Biography ==
Luxton was born on 14 August 1923 in Waitoa, the son of Lily Maria Luxton (née Finlay) and Arthur John Luxton. After completing his education at Hamilton Technical High School, he was a dairy farmer in Waitoa.

In 1945, Luxton married Margaret Joyce Ritchie, a schoolteacher, and the couple went on to have four children.

New Zealand Parliament
Years	Term	Electorate	Party
1966–1969	35th	Piako	National
1969–1972	36th	Piako	National
1972–1975	37th	Piako	National
1975–1978	38th	Piako	National
1978–1981	39th	Matamata	National
1981–1984	40th	Matamata	National
1984–1987	41st	Matamata	National

Luxton became prominent in the Waikato branch of Federated Farmers, serving as a Dominion councillor before his election to Parliament. He continued a family involvement with the Tatua Dairy Company as a director for several years. He entered Parliament as the result of the 1966 New Zealand general election as the National Party member for Piako and then, after boundary changes for the 1978 election, Matamata. He represented the predominantly rural electorate for 21 years to 1987. He was elected Chairman of Committees in 1976, a position he held until National's defeat in 1984. Interested in Pacific Island affairs, he led a government-sponsored tour of eight Pacific nations in 1976 to investigate the potential of increasing New Zealand involvement in local industries there.

On Luxton's retirement from politics in 1987, his son John Luxton succeeded him in the Matamata (later Karapiro) electorate, from 1987 to 1999.

After politics, Luxton was actively involved in his family's horticulture block at Katikati. He died in Morrinsville on 29 August 2005, at the age of 82. His wife, Margaret Luxton, died the following year.

== Honours and awards ==
In 1977, Luxton received the Queen Elizabeth II Silver Jubilee Medal. In the 1987 Queen's Birthday Honours, he was appointed a Companion of the Queen's Service Order for public services. In 1990, he was awarded the New Zealand 1990 Commemoration Medal.

== Notes ==
Political offices
Preceded by Richard Harrison	Chairman of Committees of the House of Representatives; 1978–1984	Succeeded by John Terris
New Zealand Parliament
Preceded by Geoffrey Sim	Member of Parliament for Piako; 1966–1978	Vacant Constituency abolished, recreated in 2002 Title next held by Lindsay Tisch
New constituency	Member of Parliament for Matamata; 1978–1987	Succeeded by John Luxton
