= 1889 Waipa by-election =

New Zealand by-election

The 1889 Waipa by-election was a by-election held on 21 November 1889 in the Waipa electorate during the 10th New Zealand Parliament.

The by-election was caused by the death of the incumbent MP William Jackson on 29 September.

He was replaced by John Bryce, a well-known politician. Bryce was the only candidate nominated, so was declared elected unopposed.
