= John Luxton =

New Zealand politician (1946–2021)

The Honourable John Luxton CNZM QSO
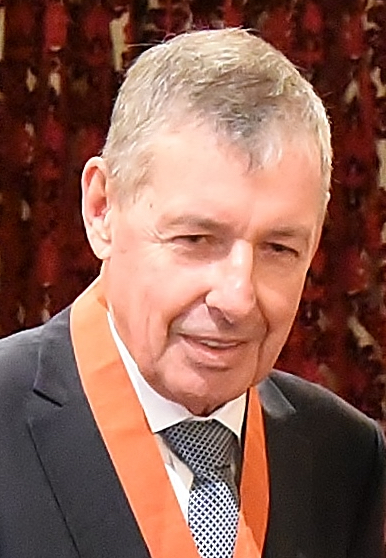
- Luxton in 2017

Member of the New Zealand Parliament for Matamata
- In office 1987–1996
- Preceded by: Jack Luxton

Member of the New Zealand Parliament for Karapiro
- In office 1996–1999
- Succeeded by: Lindsay Tisch

Member of the New Zealand Parliament for National Party List
- In office 1999–2002

Personal details
- Born: Murray John Finlay Luxton; 14 September 1946 Morrinsville, New Zealand
- Died: 16 November 2021 (aged 75) Wellington, New Zealand
- Party: National
- Relations: Jack Luxton (father)
- Education: Massey University

Murray John Finlay Luxton CNZM QSO (14 September 1946 – 16 November 2021) was a New Zealand National Party politician, serving as a Member of Parliament from 1987 to 2002. From 2008 to 2015, he was the Chairman of DairyNZ, the organisation that represents all New Zealand dairy farmers. He was co-chair of the Waikato River Authority, a Crown/iwi co-governance organisation established through Treaty of Waitangi settlement legislation to clean up the Waikato River.

== Early life and family ==
Born in Morrinsville on 14 September 1946, Luxton was educated at Hamilton Boys' High School and Massey University (BAgSc, DipAgSc, DipBusSc, MMgt). His father, Jack Luxton, was a National Party MP from 1966 to 1987.

After an initial role as a Ministry of Agriculture dairy specialist, Luxton and his late wife Merryl went dairy farming. Periods of project consulting in Africa, Asia and the Pacific were interspersed with dairy farming in New Zealand over the following decade.

== Member of Parliament ==
New Zealand Parliament
Years	Term	Electorate	List	Party
1987–1990	42nd	Matamata		National
1990–1993	43rd	Matamata		National
1993–1996	44th	Matamata		National
1996–1999	45th	Karapiro	33	National
1999–2002	46th	List	14	National

Luxton was first elected to Parliament in the 1987 election as the MP for Matamata. He replaced his father, Jack Luxton, who held the Piako electorate then Matamata for 21 years from 1966, and had been Chairman of Committees in Parliament.

Luxton held Matamata until the 1996 election, when a boundary change caused him to stand in the seat of Karapiro. In the 1999 election, he opted to become a list MP, leaving the Karapiro seat to newcomer Lindsay Tisch.

=== Minister ===
The National Party won the 1990 election, and Jim Bolger became Prime Minister, Luxton was appointed to Cabinet. His ministerial roles have included Minister of Energy, Minister of Housing, Minister of Māori Affairs, Minister of Police, Minister of Commerce, Minister of Industry, Minister of Fisheries, Minister of Lands, Minister of Customs and Minister of Agriculture. He was also an Associate Minister of Education and of Overseas Trade. Luxton was regarded by many as one of the more economically liberal members of the National Party.

== After politics ==
Luxton did not seek re-election in the 2002 election. He was one of the founders of the Open Country Cheese Company and the Kaimai Cheese Company, located near Matamata, in the Waikato, along with former colleague Wyatt Creech.

He held a number of directorships in the agribusiness sector including the Tatua Coop Dairy Company, having been a previous chairman, and Wallace Corporation, and has farming interests. He was chair of DairyNZ, the New Zealand Dairy Industry Good organisation which represents all New Zealand dairy farmers, between 2008 and 2015. He was married to Mary Scholtens, QC.

He was for a short period (2005–06) a director of listed investment and property company Blue Chip, Luxton resigned from that Board. Luxton was appointed a co-chair of the Waikato River Authority and was a member of the New Zealand Constitutional Advisory Panel. He also sat on the boards of the Royal New Zealand Ballet Company and Landcare Research, one of the Crown Research Institutes. He was chair of the Asia NZ Foundation.

Luxton died in Wellington on 16 November 2021, after a long illness.

== Honours and awards ==
In 1990, Luxton was awarded the New Zealand 1990 Commemoration Medal. In the 2003 Queen's Birthday Honours, he was appointed a Companion of the Queen's Service Order for public services. He was made a Companion of the New Zealand Order of Merit, for services to the dairy industry, in the 2017 New Year Honours. Luxton was awarded Massey University's Sir Geoffrey Peren Medal in 2013, and received an honorary Doctor of Science degree from Lincoln University in 2016.

== See also ==
- Fourth National Government of New Zealand

Political offices
Preceded by John Banks	Minister of Police; 1994–1996	Succeeded by Jack Elder
Preceded by Denis Marshall	Minister for Land Information; 1996–1999	Succeeded by Paul Swain
New Zealand Parliament
Preceded by Jack Luxton	Member of Parliament for Matamata; 1987–1996	Constituency abolished
New constituency	Member of Parliament for Karapiro; 1996–1999	Succeeded by Lindsay Tisch
