= 1878 Waipa by-election =

New Zealand by-election

The 1878 Waipa by-election was a by-election held on 24 July 1878 during the 6th New Zealand Parliament in the electorate of Waipa in the Waikato.

The by-election was caused by the resignation of the incumbent MP Alfred Cox on 13 June 1878.

The by-election was won by Edward Graham McMinn, described as a Government supporter. Special trains ran from Auckland to Mercer to poll the Auckland voters, with 60 to 70 availing themselves of this conveyance.

Frederick Alexander Whitaker opposed the government of George Grey. There were reportedly "nearly forty natives on the roll, besides some ninety votes about Auckland" (for whom the nearest polling booth was Newcastle). Whitaker lost the by-election, but won the seat in the 1879 election, and McMinn came third (Waipa voted on 10 September 1879).

== Results ==
The following table gives the election result. Note that the Returning officer (in The New Zealand Herald report) had 243 votes for Whitaker and a majority for McMinn of 41; another report from the Otago Witness has 245 and 39 but does give subtotals by booth:

1878 Waipa by-election
Party	Candidate	Votes	%	±%
Independent	Edward Graham McMinn	284	53.89	
Independent	Frederick Alexander Whitaker	243	46.11	
Majority		39	7.37	
Turnout		691		
