= Mark Staufer =

New Zealand screenwriter

- Born: 3 November 1963 (age 63); Auckland, New Zealand
- Occupations: Author and screenwriter
- Website: thenuminousplace.com

Mark Staufer (born 3 November 1963) is a New Zealand author and screenwriter. He is the author and curator of The Numinous Place and a screenwriter, most notably of Love, Laughter and Truth, a biopic about US comedian Bill Hicks, which he developed with Oscar Award-winning actor, Russell Crowe.

== Early life and education ==
Mark Staufer was born and raised in Auckland, New Zealand the only son of Franz and Jule Staufer. His parents divorced when he was less than a year old, and he was brought up by his mother and strict grandparents, Eileen and Andrew Jackson before being sent at the age of 8 to Dilworth School, a boarding school in Auckland. Staufer was expelled from Dilworth after phoning a tabloid newspaper, the Sunday News, to report ongoing sexual abuse by masters. At age 14 was enrolled at Onehunga High School, where he was also eventually expelled at age 16.

Finally, Staufer was sent to Mount Roskill Grammar School in Auckland, where he met future actor, Russell Crowe. Crowe took the newcomer under his wing and the two became fast and close friends. At MRGS they formed a band together along with a classmate, Dave Franklin, called '’Dave Decent & the Interrogatives'’ (later changed to Dave Deceit & the Interrogatives), with Staufer playing bass, Crowe singing and playing guitar and the eponymous Franklin on the drums. Staufer and Crowe also became editors of the school paper, The Phoenix, and took the opportunity to write favourable reviews of their band's performances. The two forged a friendship and a professional relationship that would last throughout their adult lives.

After graduating from Mt. Roskill, Staufer attended the journalism school at the Auckland Technical Institute (which is now Auckland University of Technology).

== Radio & Television Career ==
Upon earning his undergraduate degree, Mark began his journalism career in radio, first at talk-back AM station Radio Pacific, then at Radio Hauraki. When he was 22, he was hired as a journalist by Auckland's 89FM and subsequently promoted to News Director. There he made the switch into on-air announcing as part of the successful breakfast show duo, The Top Marks with co-host Mark Kennedy. The duo quickly ushered the show to the top of the ratings. Staufer gained a reputation for his sharp-witted sense of humour and has been described by the New Zealand Herald as a "shock jock."

Staufer eventually moved into television on the TVNZ network's current affairs show Newsnight as a writer, producer and on-camera reporter with Marcus Lush and Alison Mau. Staufer and the team experimented with the conventional news format and incorporated gonzo journalism type of reportage into the programs.

After two years on the air, Staufer sought to expand his horizons by moving to Sydney, Australia in 1995 where he began working as a director/producer at the Foxtel network and as a presenter on a controversial show called Sex/Life on Channel 10. There he met and worked with producer/director Sarah Backhouse whom he married in 1996. In 1998, the couple decided to move to the UK.

In London, Staufer acquired a job as producer/writer/director of a late-night B-movie horror show called Sci-Fright on the Sci-Fi Channel, hosted by actress Rachel Grant. After writing and directing the first three series, he was then appointed Head of Production at Universal Studios Networks in London, which owned Sci-Fi UK, with overall creative control of Sci-Fi and a movie channel called The Studio. The experience inspired Staufer's interest and first foray into screenwriting.

In 2014, he briefly re-teamed up with Mark Kennedy to host a breakfast show on The Sound, however this show was dropped after five weeks due to their style not fitting The Sound's format.

Staufer was also involved as writer and narrator in the production of the docudrama The Lost Boys of Dilworth, which premiered on TVNZ1 on 14 April 2024. The documentary deals with historical sexual abuse and rapes that occurred at Dilworth School during the 1970s. Besides Staufer, the documentary also featured interviews with former Dilworth alumni Mat Stapleton, Vaughan Sexton and Paula Doherty, the sister of the late former student Sean Doherty.

== Screenwriter/Author ==
In 2003, Staufer and his wife moved to the Greek island of Ithaca, "hoping some of Homer's magic would rub off" on his first screenplay. A few months later, the couple travelled to Los Angeles with the finished script, which was roundly rejected and criticised. Staufer says he threw the script away and devoted himself to learning craft of screenwriting properly. While honing his skills, he worked on a motorcycle horror movie with Eli Roth (Hostel) and an adaptation of the John Fowles' classic The Magus with producer Mark Gordon (Saving Private Ryan) and a number of projects with Russell Crowe, including Dolce's Inferno, a spec script by Staufer.

In 2002 Staufer began gathering evidence and researching for the book, The Numinous Place. The Numinous Place has been described as a supernatural thriller, and a cosmic detective story, written on a transmedia storytelling platform, including video and audio clips, graphic novel sections, and other visual and audio elements.

The story is narrated by the protagonist, Henry Amadeus Meat, a wayward print journalist from Auckland who stumbles into a mystery when he is assigned to report on the controversial and highly publicised deaths of human research subjects at a dream research clinic in Los Angeles. When he begins to learn about the development of a covert dream technology involving voyages to the afterlife, Meat is propelled into a chain of events where green eyed vixens and anonymous phone calls lead him deeper into the heart of a secret he labels "The Grand Deception." While writing The Numinous Place, Staufer also developed and wrote a screenplay with Crowe about US comedian Bill Hicks who died of pancreatic cancer at age 32. Staufer travelled the US, speaking to the late comedians' family and friends to research the script. The biopic, Love, Laughter & Truth, will begin production in 2013 with Crowe making his directorial debut.
