= Frederick Alexander Whitaker =

New Zealand politician (1847–1887)

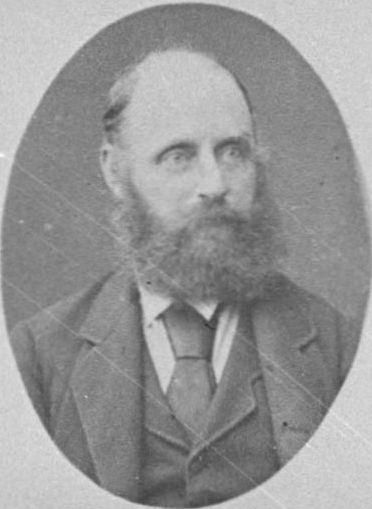
Frederick Alexander Whitaker in 1882

New Zealand Parliament
| Years | Term | Electorate | Party |
|---|---|---|---|
| 1879–1881 | 7th | Waipa | Independent |
| 1881–1884 | 8th | Waipa | Independent |

Frederick Alexander Whitaker (1 March 1847 – 9 June 1887) was a 19th-century member of parliament in the Waikato region of New Zealand.

Whitaker was born in Pernambuco, Brazil, on 1 March 1847; he was the eldest son of Frederick Whitaker, New Zealand's 5th Premier. He married Kate Cox, the daughter of Alfred Cox, at Riverslea farm near Temuka in South Canterbury on 30 September 1879, three days after her 20th birthday. In the same ceremony, Cox's twin sister Marian married Francis Henry Barker, the fourth son of the late Dr Alfred Barker.

He lost the 1878 by-election for Waipa to Edward Graham McMinn, a "Greyite".

He then represented the Waipa electorate from 1879 to 1884, when he retired having served as government whip during his father's premiership.

He committed suicide in the Auckland Club on 9 June 1887 triggered by losses from land speculation. He was given a private funeral and was buried alongside his mother in St. Stephen's Churchyard in Auckland.

New Zealand Parliament
| Preceded by Edward Graham McMinn | Member of Parliament for Waipa; 1879–1884 | Succeeded by Edward Lake |
