= Edward Lake (politician) =

New Zealand politician

New Zealand Parliament
Years	Term	Electorate	Party
1884–1887	9th	Waipa	Independent
1891–1893	11th	Waikato	Independent

Edward Lake (1835 – 25 February 1908) was a 19th-century independent conservative Member of Parliament in the Waikato region of New Zealand.

Lake was born in Kent, England. He came to New Zealand in 1875.

He represented the Waipa electorate from 1884 to 1887, when he retired. He then represented the Waikato electorate from an 1891 by-election to 1893, when he retired.

Lake died on 25 February 1908 at Onehunga.

New Zealand Parliament
Preceded by Frederick Alexander Whitaker	Member of Parliament for Waipa; 1884–1887	Succeeded by William Jackson
Preceded by John Bryce	Member of Parliament for Waikato; 1891–1893	Succeeded by Alfred Cadman
