= Samson Setu =

New Zealand opera singer

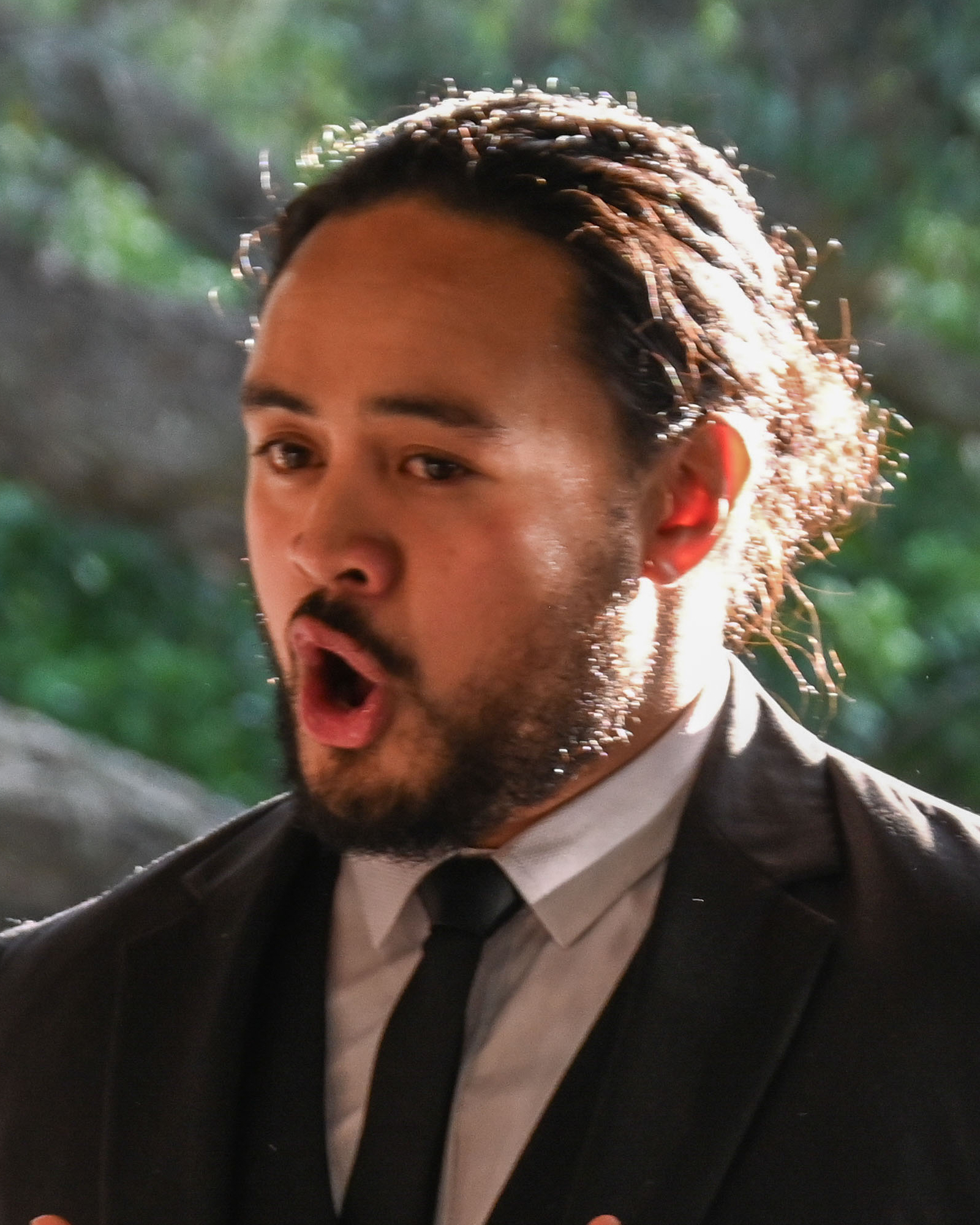
- Setu in 2024

Background information
- Born: 1993 or 1994 (age 31–32); Auckland, New Zealand
- Genres: Classical
- Occupation: Opera singer

Samson Setu (born 1993 or 1994) is a New Zealand-born bass-baritone opera singer of Samoan descent.

== Early life ==
Setu was born in Auckland, New Zealand, and grew up in the South Auckland suburb of Manurewa. He attended a church in Manurewa where his grandfather was a pastor. He gained initial experience in singing and playing in a band at the church.

Setu's singing talent was identified while he was a student at Dilworth School in Auckland, and he credits his participation in the school choir with developing his interest in classical singing. He was the head chorister of the school choir in 2011, and was the cultural leader for the New Zealand Secondary Students' Choir trip to South Africa in 2012. He recalls that when he started, he was the only choir member who could not read music.

== Career ==
Setu undertook tertiary education in music at the University of Otago in Dunedin, but pulled out in his third year of studies, and travelled to Brighton in England with the hope of an alternative career in professional rugby. He was offered a contract, but a last-minute intervention by his mother encouraged him to complete his studies in music. He transferred to the University of Auckland where there were other vocal students from Pasifika backgrounds, and he completed his studies under Te Oti Rakena.

Setu has participated in the Dame Kiri Te Kanawa Programme for Young Singers.

In 2018, Setu won a Dame Malvina Major Emerging Artist Scholarship with the New Zealand Opera School and was awarded the 2018 'Merle Higgie' Opera Prize for Potential.

In 2019, Setu won the Creative New Zealand Arts Pasifika Iosefa Enari Memorial Award.

In 2019, along with Tongan tenor Manase Latu, Setu was awarded a Circle100 scholarship that enabled both singers to travel to London as Kiri Scholars, to study at the Royal College of Music. While studying in London, both singers were invited to travel to New York and audition at the Metropolitan Opera. Both were subsequently accepted into the Lindemann Young Artist Development Program in 2020, and were the first New Zealanders to win a place in this programme.

Setu has been a member of a vocal quartet, The Shades, comprising singers of Tongan and Samoan heritage. The group was formed in 2015, and has learned Croatian music under the leadership of Goran Kačurov, a Zagreb-born teacher who is now a New Zealand resident. In 2020, The Shades collaborated with Goran Karan on a video dedicated to a victim of the 2020 Zagreb earthquake.

In September 2023, Setu will sing the lead role in (m)Orpheus in the New Zealand Opera post-modern version of Orfeo ed Euridice. He will then take up a contract with the Zürich Opera House in Switzerland.
