= Edward Graham McMinn =

New Zealand politician

New Zealand Parliament
Years	Term	Electorate	Party
1878–1879	6th	Waipa	Independent

Edward Graham McMinn (1843 – 30 May 1883) was a 19th-century Member of Parliament in the Waikato Region of New Zealand.

Edward Graham McMinn was born in the town of Antrim in Northern Ireland to Francis Joseph McMinn and Mary McMinn.

He represented the Waipa electorate from 1878 to 1879, when he was defeated.

In the 1879 election, Whitaker won the seat and McMinn came third (Waipa voted on 10 September 1879). The "Greyite" (Liberal) vote was split.

He was found dead in his bed at Harapipi southwest of Hamilton, aged 40 years. He had been a staff-sergeant in Von Tempsky's Forest Rangers.

New Zealand Parliament
Preceded by Alfred Cox	Member of Parliament for Waipa; 1878–1879	Succeeded by Frederick Alexander Whitaker
