= Piako (electorate) =

Piako was a New Zealand parliamentary electorate established in 1946 and disestablished in 2008. It was last held by Lindsay Tisch MP from 2002 to 2008.

== Population centres ==
The 1941 New Zealand census had been postponed due to World War II, so the 1946 electoral redistribution had to take ten years of population growth and movements into account. The North Island gained a further two electorates from the South Island due to faster population growth. The abolition of the country quota through the Electoral Amendment Act, 1945 reduced the number and increased the size of rural electorates. None of the existing electorates remained unchanged, 27 electorates were abolished, eight former electorates were re-established, and 19 electorates were created for the first time, including Piako.

The First Labour Government was defeated in the 1949 election and the incoming National Government changed the Electoral Act, with the electoral quota once again based on total population as opposed to qualified electors, and the tolerance was increased to 7.5% of the electoral quota. There was no adjustments in the number of electorates between the South and North Islands, but the law changes resulted in boundary adjustments to almost every electorate through the 1952 electoral redistribution; only five electorates were unaltered. Five electorates were reconstituted and one was newly created, and a corresponding six electorates were abolished (including Piako); all of these in the North Island. These changes took effect with the 1954 election.

After years of political tension, the National Government came to an agreement with the Labour Party on the redistribution provisions of the electoral law. This resulted in the 1956 Electoral Act, which significantly changed the composition of the Representation Commission; since then, there has been one member representing the government, and one the opposition, apart from all the official members. Tolerance to the electoral quota was reduced again to 5%. The 1957 electoral redistribution made an adjustments in the number of electorates between the South and North Islands, with Waimate in the South Island abolished and Piako in the North Island reconstituted. Combined with significant population redistributions within the islands, the boundaries of all but two electorates were altered. These changes took effect with the 1957 election.

The electorate included the population centres of Matamata, Cambridge, Morrinsville, Te Aroha, Waharoa, Waitoa, Huntly, Ngāruawāhia, and Ohaupo.

== History ==
Piako was a rural Waikato electorate from 1946 to 1954, then from 1957 to 1978, when it was renamed Matamata. Piako was resurrected for the 2002 election, replacing Karapiro.

Under boundary changes for the 2008 election, Piako ceased to exist as an electorate. Its population centres were distributed between the neighbouring seats of Hunua and Papakura. Officially, Piako was replaced on paper by the seat of Waikato.

Piako and its predecessors have always been considered safe National electorates. The Piako electorate was held by Jack Luxton from 1966 to 1978, when he transferred to the Matamata electorate.

When the Piako electorate was re-created for the 2002 election, it was won by Lindsay Tisch, who had previously held the Karapiro electorate. Tisch served until the electorate was abolished in 2008, and transferred to the Waikato electorate.

=== Members of Parliament ===
Key

National

Election	Winner
1946 election	Stan Goosman
1949 election	Stan Goosman
1951 election	Stan Goosman
(Electorate abolished 1954–1957, see Waipa)
1957 election	Stan Goosman
1960 election	Stan Goosman
1963 election	Geoffrey Sim
1966 election	Jack Luxton
1969 election	Jack Luxton
1972 election	Jack Luxton
1975 election	Jack Luxton
(Electorate abolished 1978–2002, see Matamata)
2002 election	Lindsay Tisch
2005 election	Lindsay Tisch
(Electorate abolished in 2008; see Waikato)

=== List MPs ===
Members of Parliament elected from party lists in elections where that person also unsuccessfully contested the Piako electorate. Unless otherwise stated, all MPs' terms began and ended at general elections.

Key Labour NZ First

Election	Winner
2005 election	Sue Moroney
2005 election	Barbara Stewart

== Election results ==
=== 1975 election ===
1975 general election: Piako
Party	Candidate	Votes	%	±%
National	Jack Luxton	10,248	59.9	+4.5
Labour	Helen Clark	4,074	23.8	
Social Credit	Alex Mikkelson	2,322	13.6	−1.8
Values	Sally Ruth Child	460	2.7	
Majority		6,174	36.1	+6.7
Turnout		20,538	83.5	
