= Ernest Gray (New Zealand politician) =

New Zealand politician

Ernest Gray (1833 – 14 July 1895) was a member of the New Zealand Legislative Council from 19 June 1866 to 20 July 1883, when he resigned.

Gray was an early settler in Canterbury. He took up the Coldstream run on the Rangitata River and later the Hoon Hay run near Christchurch. He married a daughter of Lieutenant-colonel Ewan Macpherson, who was at one time stationed with the 99th Regiment of Foot in Tasmania. Her sister, Mary Macpherson, married Alfred Cox, who was thus his brother-in-law.

He was on the committee of the Canterbury A&P Association from 1882 until his death, and was president in 1882. The vacancy on the board of the A&P Association was filled by appointing Arthur Rhodes.

Gray died suddenly on 14 July 1895 at his home in the Christchurch suburb of Hoon Hay from a cerebral hemorrhage. He was survived by his wife, four daughters, and two sons. He was buried at Halswell Cemetery.
