= Lindsay Tisch =

Former New Zealand politician

Lindsay Tisch QSO JP
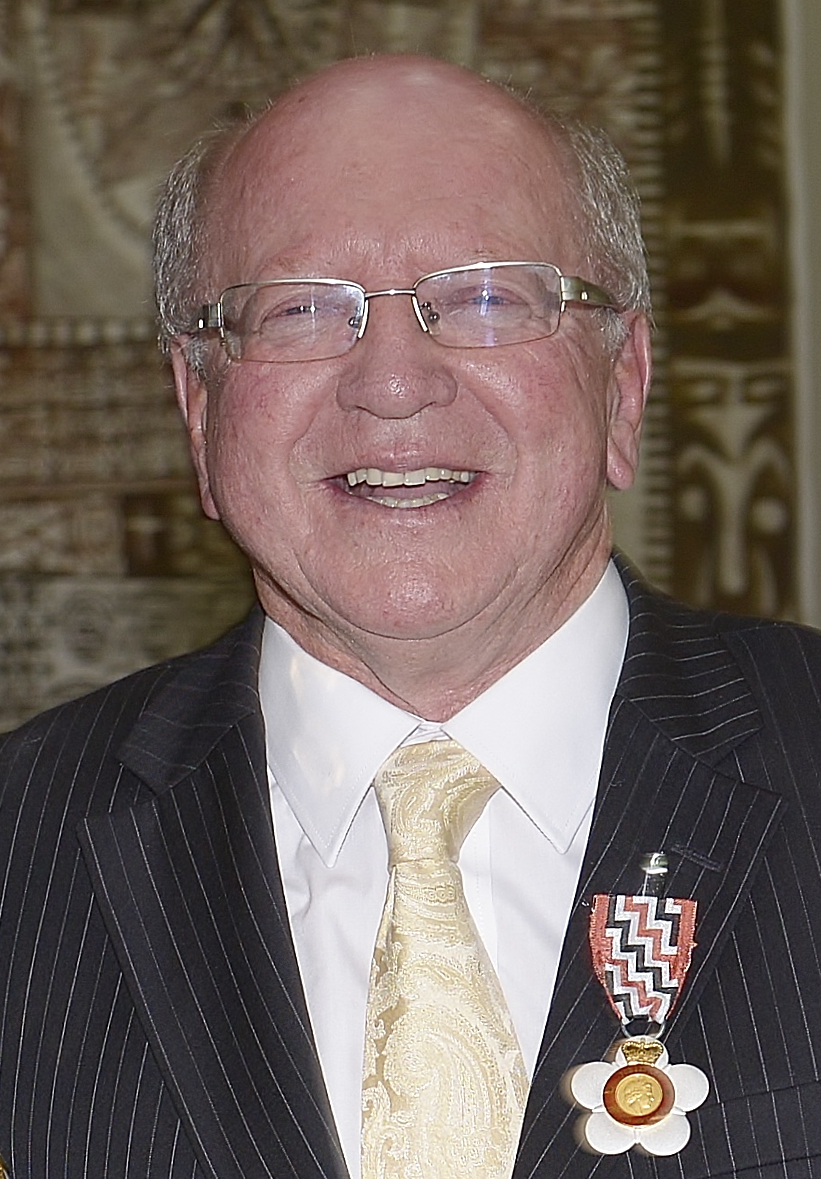
- Tisch in 2018

Member of the New Zealand Parliament for Karapiro
- In office 1999–2002
- Preceded by: John Luxton
- Succeeded by: constituency abolished

Member of the New Zealand Parliament for Piako
- In office 2002–2008
- Preceded by: Jack Luxton (in 1978)
- Succeeded by: constituency abolished

Member of the New Zealand Parliament for Waikato
- In office 2008–2017
- Preceded by: Rob Storey (in 1996)
- Succeeded by: Tim van de Molen

Personal details
- Born: William Lindsay Tisch; 9 October 1947 (age 79) Auckland, New Zealand
- Spouse: Leonie Tisch

William Lindsay Tisch (born 9 October 1947) is a former New Zealand National Party politician.

== Early life ==
Tisch was born in Auckland, New Zealand, in 1947. When he was a child, his family moved to Matamata. He obtained a diploma in agriculture from Lincoln College. He has worked as a farmer and a rural valuer, and was a management consultant. He was a director of Landcorp (1991–1997) and is a member of the Institute of Directors in New Zealand and the New Zealand Institute of Property Management.

Tisch is a Justice of the Peace, a trustee of the Pohlen Hospital Foundation based in Matamata, and a member of Matamata Lions Clubs.

== Member of Parliament ==
New Zealand Parliament
| Years | Term | Electorate | List | Party |
|---|---|---|---|---|
| 1999–2002 | 46th | Karapiro | None | National |
| 2002–2005 | 47th | Piako | None | National |
| 2005–2008 | 48th | Piako | 24 | National |
| 2008–2011 | 49th | Waikato | 19 | National |
| 2011–2014 | 50th | Waikato | 24 | National |
| 2014–2017 | 51st | Waikato | 26 | National |

He joined the National Party in 1966, and has held a number of senior roles in its organisational wing. In 1994 he served briefly as the party's president and was the party's campaign manager for the 1996 election. He was a member of Parliament from 1999 to 2017, when he retired.

Tisch was selected to replace John Luxton as National's candidate in the electorate of Karapiro in the 1999 election. He defeated the Labour candidate by 5,000 votes. The name of the electorate was changed back to Piako for the 2002 election and the 2005 election; Tisch was comfortably re-elected each time. The name referred to a little-known river past Morrinsville, and Tisch was successful in lobbying to have the electorate renamed after the Waikato River.

In the 2008 election, Tisch was re-elected in the recreated Waikato seat with a majority of 12,850 over Jacinda Ardern. He was further re-elected in the 2011 election and 2014 election, after which he retired.

In 2009, it was revealed Tisch was using a front company to maximise his accommodation allowance paid by the taxpayer. Tisch was claiming $410 a week which was paid to his property investment company, Heritage 653 Limited.

Tisch was never a minister but held senior parliamentary roles in the National Party and in the House of Representatives. He was the National Party junior whip (2002–2005) and senior whip (2005–2006) before taking on roles as Deputy Speaker of the House (2008–2011) and Assistant Speaker of the House (2011–2017). Under former leaders Bill English and Don Brash, Tisch was briefly National Party spokesperson for small business (2002–2005), civil defence and emergency services (2003–2004), and internal affairs (2003–2005).

=== Political views ===
Tisch held conservative views and opposed same-sex marriage law reform. In 2004, Tisch voted against the Civil Union Act 2004, a bill making it legal for those in same-sex as well as heterosexual relationships to enter into a civil-union. In 2005, Tisch voted for Gordon Copeland's Marriage (Gender Clarification) Amendment Bill, a bill which would have amended the Marriage Act to define marriage as only between a man and woman. In 2012 and 2013, Tisch voted against the Marriage (Definition of Marriage) Amendment Bill, a bill allowing same-sex couples to marry in New Zealand.

== Honours ==
Tisch was one of the 3,632 recipients of the New Zealand 1990 Commemoration Medal, which he received for services to the public.

In the 2018 New Year Honours, Tisch was appointed a Companion of the Queen's Service Order for services as a Member of Parliament. In the 2020 New Year Honours, his wife, Leonie, was awarded the Queen's Service Medal, for services to health and the community.

Party political offices
| Preceded by John Collinge | President of the National Party; 1994 | Succeeded by Geoff Thompson |
New Zealand Parliament
| Preceded by John Luxton | Member of Parliament for Karapiro; 1999–2002 | Constituencies abolished |
| Vacant Constituency abolished in 1978, recreated in 2002 Title last held by Jack Luxton | Member of Parliament for Piako; 2002–2008 | Constituencies abolished |
| Vacant Constituency abolished in 1996, recreated in 2008 Title last held by Rob Storey | Member of Parliament for Waikato; 2008–2017 | Succeeded by Tim van de Molen |
