= The Lost Boys of Dilworth =

New Zealand documentary film by Peter Burger and Mary Durham

- Directed by: Peter Burger; Mary Durham
- Written by: Mark Staufer
- Narrated by: Mark Staufer
- Edited by: Emma Patterson
- Distributed by: TVNZ
- Release date: 14 April 2024 (New Zealand)
- Running time: 64 minutes
- Country: New Zealand
- Language: English

The Lost Boys of Dilworth is a 2024 New Zealand docudrama that explores revelations of sexual abuse by staff against students at Auckland's Dilworth School. It was written and presented by former Dilworth student and victim Mark Staufer and screened on TVNZ1 and TVNZ+ on 14 April 2024. Besides Staufer, the documentary also featured interviews with former Dilworth alumni Mat Stapleton, Vaughan Sexton and Paula Doherty, the sister of the late former student Sean Doherty.

== Synopsis ==
The documentary recounts the experiences of former Dilworth School students Mark Staufer, Mat Stapleton and Vaughan Sexton. These former students endured bullying, sexual assault and corporal punishment at the hands of older students, tutors, and teachers during the 1970s. The documentary also interviews Paula Doherty, the sister of the late former student Sean Doherty.

Staufer talked about the trauma of being separated from his mother, who had sent him to Dilworth School. He also talked about being humiliated for bedwetting. Staufer also talked about a culture of hazing being encouraged among older students, likening it to Lord of the Flies. Stapleton and Sexton also talked about being punished by having thick books placed on their hands over heaters or being forced to bathe in clod water. Staufer also talked about sustaining a scar above his lip at the age of 11 years old. Interviewees claim there was no escape from bullying and violence.

At the age of 12, Staufer and another student escaped the school disguised as scouts. They were later found and caned. The interviewees described caning as a form of public humiliation. Staufer talked about confiding about his sadness and bullying with a housemaster, who subsequently caned him for being out of bed. He also talked about students being punished by other children not being allowed to talk to them.

Staufer has fond memories of English language teacher Mrs Barbara Morgan, whom he regarded as kind because she did not use corporal punishment or violence. Morgan says that Staufer was creative but could not sit still. Staufer talked about having fond memories of weekend visits to his mother, who was dismissive of his unhappiness with the school. After Staufer showed his welts to her, the principal sought to minimise the incident.

Staufer talked about being groomed and raped by Dilworth's chaplain Peter Taylor, who had befriended the boys and invited them to his home to play with his model train set. Taylor took an interest in Staufer, appealing to his interests in literature and music. Staufer reported the abuse to the principal but was disciplined. After several years of abuse, Staufer unsuccessfully circulated a petition to have Taylor expelled. The principal dismissed his petition and told Staufer's mother that he was causing trouble. Determined to get himself expelled, Staufer contacted the Sunday News newspaper but was caught by a teacher. The principal subsequently expelled him from Dilworth, which he regarded as a victory.

Though the newspaper subsequently contacted the principal, he denied any wrongdoing. Following his expulsion, Staufer expressed regret for not following up on the matter. Staufer subsequently became a father and screenwriter. However, he was unable to reconcile with his mother prior to her death during the COVID-19 pandemic, who never accepted that her son had been abused. Doherty talked about her late brother Sean being traumatised by his sexual abuse and committing suicide. Stapleton also talked about getting involved in drugs and alcohol due to his sexual abuse. Sexton talked about not letting himself being defined by his child abuse.

The documentary caption explains that Peter Thomas was convicted of sexual offending during the 1970s at Dilworth in 1994 and 2000. It also mentions that 175 boys have been identified as sexual abuse victims between 1952 and 2018. Nine abusers were imprisoned, two were sentenced to home detention and three died before their cases were heard. The caption also mentions that Dilworth has begun a compensation programme for victims but declined to participate in the documentary. Former victim Neil Harding has filed a class action lawsuit.

== Production ==
=== Development and writing ===
On 10 July 2023, NZ On Air granted The Lost Boys of Dilworth NZ$1,073,109 in funding. Former Dilworth alumni and abuse victim Mark Staufer served as the documentary's writer and narrator. Co-director Mary Durham made Staufer the documentary's narrator because "of the authenticity of hearing it from somebody who lived it."

=== Filming ===
Mary Durham directed the documentary portions of the film while Peter Burger directed the dramatised scenes. Burger said that adding dramatisation to the documentary helped show the impact of the sexual offending and rape on the victims. The dramatic sequences were film by a separate creative team and crew, who had their own separate script. Due to the sensitive content, production worked closely with the parents of the child actors "when it came to how much context they were given." Production also used the services of intimacy co-ordinator Bree Peters to ensure the safety of the actors on set. Emma Patterson served as the film's editor. Preston O'Brien played Chaplain Peter Taylor, who abused several Dilworth students including Staufer.

Since no school or church in the Auckland Region were willing to serve as filming locations for Lost Boys, the dramatised scenes were filmed at Kingseat Hospital. The directors made the decision to film the dramatised scenes from a child's perspective. During an interview with The New Zealand Herald, Durham said "I think hearing from the men as they edge towards and tip over the 60-year-old mark ... is extraordinarily powerful. But, when you see these men represented by these young actors, as children, that's what really hammers it home. You see how innocent and how lovely these children were and the obvious effects that have been wrought on them all these years later."

== Release ==
The Lost Boys of Dilworth premiered on TVNZ1 at 8:30 pm on 14 April 2024. It was also released on TVNZ's streaming service TVNZ+.

== Reception ==
Dilworth School was invited to take part in the production of The Lost Boys of Dilworth several times but declined to take part. Prior to the documentary's release, the school's Trust Board chair Aaron Snodgrass said: "We also reaffirm our commitment to protecting the privacy of all former students who were abused and minimising any further stress for them – and for these reasons will not comment on The Lost Boys of Dilworth after it has screened."

Staufer, Stapleton and Doherty, who took part in the documentary, criticised Dilworth for their perceived lack of accountability and stonewalling of sexual assault victims. By contrast, Sexton was more sympathetic to Dilworth's decision not to comment, emphasising that the school had commissioned an independent inquiry into the sexual abuses and that they were being advised by "a panel of experts telling them what to say and what not to say."
