= James Dilworth =

New Zealand politician and farmer (1815–1894)

- Born: 15 August 1815; Probably Donaghmore, County Tyrone, Ireland
- Died: 23 December 1894 (aged 79); Remuera, Auckland, New Zealand
- Occupations: Farmer, accountant, landowner
- Known for: Dilworth School, member of Auckland Provincial Council, founding trustee of Auckland Savings Bank
- Spouse: Isabella Dilworth

James Dilworth (15 August 1815 – 23 December 1894) was a New Zealand farmer, investor, speculator and philanthropist. He was born in Donaghmore, County Tyrone, Ireland, on 15 August 1815 and attended the nearby Royal School, Dungannon, where a blue plaque was unveiled in his memory on 7 October 2014, by the Ulster History Circle.

== Political career ==
Dilworth was elected to the first Auckland Provincial Council for the Southern Division electorate in August 1853. He remained a member of the provincial council until September 1861.

== Charitable work ==
The Dilworth Trust Board was the benefactor of the estate of Dilworth, who received his legal advice from the solicitor Samuel Jackson. The trust funds Dilworth School a full boarding school for boys in Auckland, New Zealand. A school where all boys are on full scholarships covering all education and boarding costs.

In 2018, Dilworth was posthumously inducted into the New Zealand Business Hall of Fame.
