= Matamata (electorate) =

Matamata was a New Zealand parliamentary electorate in the Waikato, from 1978 to 1996. It was a rural and safe National electorate, held by Jack Luxton from 1978 to 1987, and then by his son John Luxton from 1987 to 1996.

== Population centres ==
The 1977 electoral redistribution was the most overtly political since the Representation Commission had been established through an amendment to the Representation Act in 1886, initiated by Muldoon's National Government. As part of the 1976 census, a large number of people failed to fill out an electoral re-registration card, and census staff had not been given the authority to insist on the card being completed. This had little practical effect for people on the general roll, but it transferred Māori to the general roll if the card was not handed in. Together with a northward shift of New Zealand's population, this resulted in five new electorates having to be created in the upper part of the North Island. The electoral redistribution was very disruptive, and 22 electorates were abolished, while 27 electorates were newly created (including Matamata) or re-established. These changes came into effect for the 1978 election. Matamata was a rural Waikato electorate, formed from the former Piako electorate in 1978. In 1996 for the first MMP election, the enlarged electorate was renamed Karapiro.

The original electorate included the following population centres: Morrinsville, Matamata, Cambridge, and Putāruru.

== History ==
In the 1978 election, the Matamata electorate was won by National's Jack Luxton, who had been MP for the Piako electorate since 1966. When he retired at the 1987 election, he was succeeded by his son John Luxton. When the Matamata electorate was abolished in 1996, Luxton successfully stood in the Karapiro electorate.

=== Members of Parliament ===
Key

National

Election	Winner
1978 election	Jack Luxton
1981 election	Jack Luxton
1984 election	Jack Luxton
1987 election	John Luxton
1990 election	John Luxton
1993 election	John Luxton
(Electorate abolished in 1996; see Karapiro)
