= William Jackson (New Zealand politician) =

19th century Member of Parliament (1832–1899)

Member of the New Zealand Parliament for Waikato
- In office 1 March 1872 – 6 December 1875

Member of the New Zealand Parliament for Waipa
- In office 26 September 1887 – 29 September 1889

Personal details
- Born: 11 October 1832 Providence Green, Green Hammerton, Yorkshire, England
- Died: 29 September 1889 (aged 56) at sea
- Party: Independent
- Spouse: Bridget Jackson
- Relations: John Jackson (brother); Samuel Jackson (brother)
- Children: nil

William Jackson (11 October 1832 – 29 September 1889), generally known as Major Jackson, was a 19th-century Member of Parliament in the Waikato region of New Zealand.

== Early life ==
Jackson was born in 1832 in Providence Green, Green Hammerton, near Harrogate, Yorkshire, England. He was the son of Samuel Jackson (1806–1858), a brewer and yeoman who owned and farmed his land, and Sarah Jackson (née Hughlings; 1807/08–1836), the daughter of a Welsh revenue collector. His mother died when he was four. He had three brothers and a sister; all but one of the brothers emigrated to New Zealand.

His parents had married on 24 March 1828. His oldest sibling was his sister Ann (30 April 1829 – 9 August 1859). She died three days after giving birth to her first child. His eldest brother was Samuel, who studied law, was called to the bar in 1853, and emigrated to Auckland in 1856, where he became a prominent lawyer. William himself was the third of the children; he was born on 11 October 1832 and baptised a month later on 12 November. Thomas (2 December 1833 – 15 November 1906) was the next sibling. He became a mariner and also emigrated to New Zealand. His youngest brother, John (4 April 1835 – 7 October 1911), remained in England and became a prominent neurologist.

He emigrated to Australia in 1857 to join the Victorian gold rush. Sometime later, he went to New Zealand to join two brothers who were already there. His wife was Bridget.

== New Zealand ==
New Zealand Parliament
Years	Term	Electorate	Party
1872–1875	5th	Waikato	Independent
1887–1889	10th	Waipa	Independent

In New Zealand, Jackson first farmed in Mangatawhiri, then Rangiaohia, Kihikihi, and then Papakura. When the Invasion of Waikato commenced, Jackson organised a local militia that became known as Jackson's Forest Rangers, and he was commissioned as Major Jackson. When militia stole a Māori flag, his wife hid it under her dress, wearing it as a petticoat. In retaliation, Jackson's house was burned down twice.

He represented the Waikato electorate from 1872 to 1875, when he retired. He then represented the Waipa electorate from 1887 to 1889, when he died. As a politician, it is said that he was as vigorous as he had been as a militia leader. During his time in parliament, he supported the Stafford and Atkinson Ministries.

Jackson went missing during a voyage on the SS Rotorua en route from New Plymouth to Onehunga. He disappeared during the night of 29/30 September 1889, and it is assumed that he got sick, went on deck and fell over board.

The Jacksons had no children.

== Notes ==
New Zealand Parliament
Preceded by James McPherson	Member of Parliament for Waikato; 1872–1876	Succeeded by Frederick Whitaker
Preceded by Edward Lake	Member of Parliament for Waipa; 1887–1889	Succeeded by John Bryce
