= Waipa (electorate) =

Waipa is a former parliamentary electorate in the Waikato region of New Zealand, which existed for various periods between 1876 and 1996.

== Population centres ==
In the 1875 electoral redistribution, the House of Representatives increased representation by 10 seats, but this was mostly achieved through adding more members to existing electorates. Only two new electorates were created, and the Waipa electorate was one of them. It was created by splitting the area of the Waikato electorate. For the first election in 1876, polling booths were in Hamilton West (the Waikato River was the electorate's boundary), Ngāruawāhia, Alexandra (since renamed to Pirongia), Raglan, and Ōhaupō.

In the 1881 electoral redistribution, the Waipa electorate was not altered. In the 1887 electoral redistribution, the Waipa electorate lost some area in the south and east, and Awakino went to the Taranaki electorate, whilst Tūrangi went to the Tauranga electorate. In the 1890 electoral redistribution, Waipa was abolished and the vast majority of its area went to the Waikato electorate, which shifted west.

In the 1892 electoral redistribution, Waikato electorate moved east again and the Waipa electorate was re-created. For the first time, it extended as far north as the Firth of Thames.

The First Labour Government was defeated in the 1949 election and the incoming National Government changed the Electoral Act, with the electoral quota once again based on total population as opposed to qualified electors, and the tolerance was increased to 7.5% of the electoral quota. There was no adjustments in the number of electorates between the South and North Islands, but the law changes resulted in boundary adjustments to almost every electorate through the 1952 electoral redistribution; only five electorates were unaltered. Five electorates were reconstituted (including Waipa) and one was newly created, and a corresponding six electorates were abolished; all of these in the North Island. These changes took effect with the 1954 election.

Through an amendment in the Electoral Act in 1965, the number of electorates in the South Island was fixed at 25, an increase of one since the 1962 electoral redistribution. It was accepted that through the more rapid population growth in the North Island, the number of its electorates would continue to increase, and to keep proportionality, three new electorates were allowed for in the 1967 electoral redistribution for the next election. In the North Island, five electorates were newly created and one electorate was reconstituted while three electorates were abolished (including Waipa). In the South Island, three electorates were newly created and one electorate was reconstituted while three electorates were abolished. The overall effect of the required changes was highly disruptive to existing electorates, with all but three electorates having their boundaries altered. These changes came into effect with the 1969 election.

== History ==
Waipa existed from 1876 to 1890, 1893 to 1896, then from 1954 to 1969, and then from 1978 to 1996.

Holders of the electorate from 1876 to 1890 were:

- Alfred Cox 1876–78 (resigned)
- Edward Graham McMinn 1878–79 (defeated)
- Frederick Alexander Whitaker 1879–84 (retired)
- Edward Lake 1884–87 (retired)
- William Jackson 1887–89 (died)
- John Bryce 1889–90 (stood for Waikato)

For the period from 1893 to 1896, there was one representative:

- Frederic Lang 1893–96

=== Election results ===
The following members represented Waipa:

Key

Independent Conservative National

Election	Winner
1876 election	Alfred Cox
1878 by-election	Edward McMinn
1879 election	Frederick Whitaker
1881 election	Frederick Whitaker
1884 election	Edward Lake
1887 election	William Jackson
1889 by-election	John Bryce
(Electorate abolished 1890–1893; see Waikato)
1893 election	Frederic Lang
(Electorate abolished 1896–1954)
1954 election	Stan Goosman
1957 election	Hallyburton Johnstone
1960 election	Hallyburton Johnstone
1963 election	Leslie Munro
1966 election	Leslie Munro
(Electorate abolished 1969–1978)
1978 election	Marilyn Waring
1981 election	Marilyn Waring
1984 election	Katherine O'Regan
1987 election	Katherine O'Regan
1990 election	Katherine O'Regan
1993 election	Katherine O'Regan

=== 1878 by-election ===
1878 Waipa by-election
Party	Candidate	Votes	%	±%
Independent	Edward Graham McMinn	284	53.89	
Independent	Frederick Alexander Whitaker	243	46.11	
Majority		39	7.37	
Turnout		691		
