= Dilworth School =

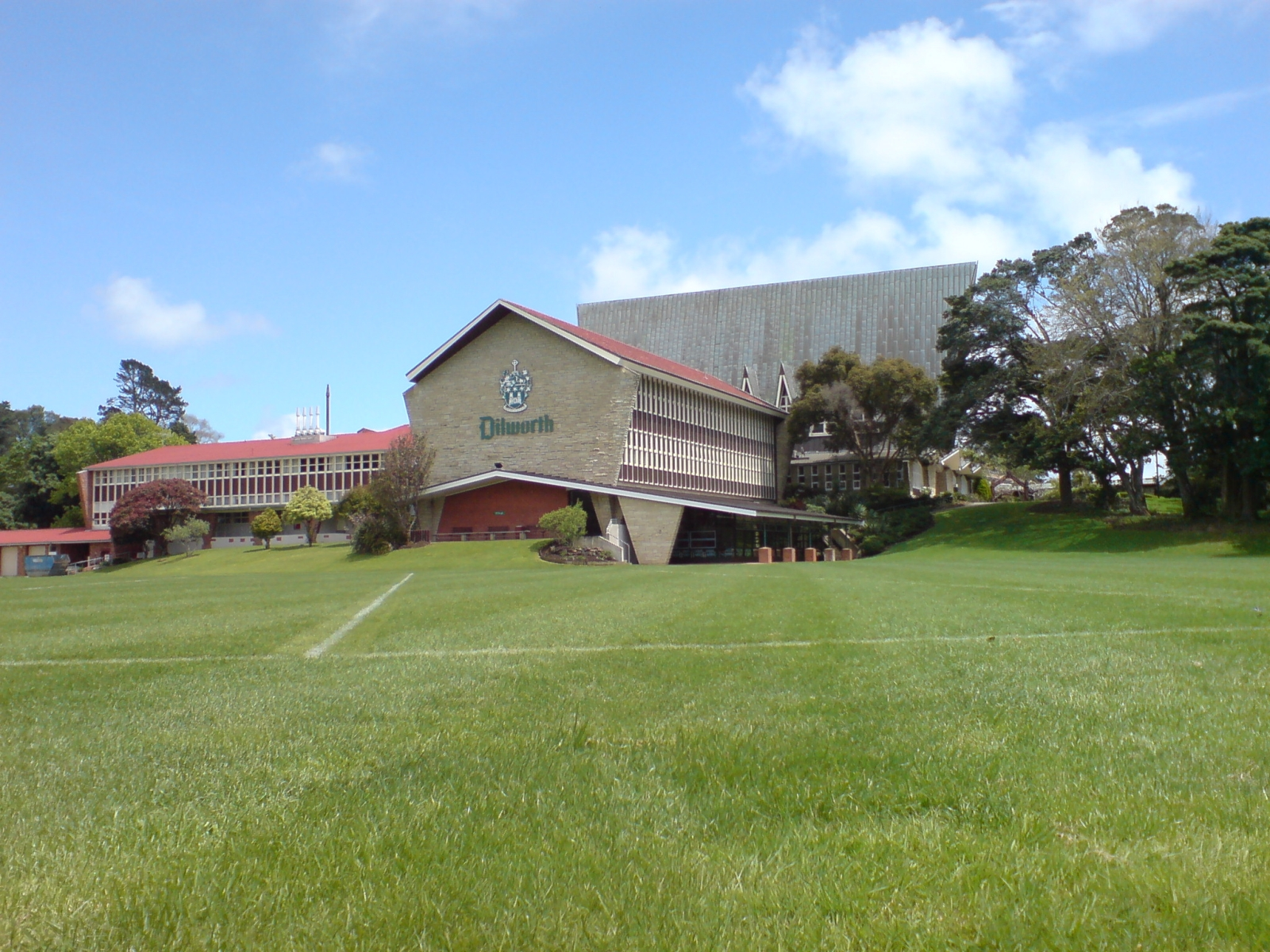
- The Senior Campus buildings from Great South Road

Location
- 2 Erin Street, Epsom, Auckland, New Zealand; 36.8805°S 174.7810°E (Senior Campus); 36.8822°S 174.7891°E (Junior Campus); 37.187348°S 175.148°E (Rural Campus)

Information
- Type: Private, boys, year 5–13, with boarding facilities
- Motto: Latin: Firmiter et Fideliter (strength and steadfastness)
- Established: 1906
- Founder: James Dilworth
- Ministry of Education Institution no.: 66
- Chairman: Aaron Snodgrass
- Headmaster: Dan Reddiex
- Enrolment: 506 (July 2026)
- Socio-economic decile: 4
- Website: dilworth.school.nz

Dilworth School, often referred to simply as Dilworth, is an independent full boarding school for boys in Auckland, New Zealand. It is the largest full boarding school in Australasia. Owned and operated by a charitable trust, boys selected to attend do so on scholarships covering education and boarding costs.

== History ==
Dilworth School was founded under the terms of the will of an Auckland farmer and businessman, Irish born James Dilworth who died in 1894.

He and his wife Isabella had no children of their own and left their wealth to establish a school with a goal of educating sons of people from the top two-thirds of the North Island who had suffered some family misfortune and were unable to afford the education they wanted their children to have.

The school opened in 1906 with eight boys and for the first 21 years offered primary education only. Secondary boys at that time boarded at the school but attended Auckland Grammar School during the day. The original school buildings were Dilworth's old farm homestead and outbuildings. Classrooms and other buildings were added later.

A secondary department was built in 1931. A major expansion started in 1956, the 50th anniversary, with the foundation stone being laid for St Patrick's Chapel. The total roll when that phase of the expansion was completed some five years later, was 300.

The next major jump in numbers was in 1993 when the present Junior Campus was built to accommodate 192 boys. This brought the total roll of both campuses to 510 covering Year 5 to Year 13.

In December 2019, Dilworth presented a vision to create a girls' boarding school to open in 2025.

Dilworth's boarding houses are named for places and counties in Ireland. The Junior Campus houses are Cotter and Gibson and Senior Campus houses are Tyrone, Dungannon, Donegal, Armagh, and Wilton with a recent addition of Donaghmore and Aghalee as new Year 9 houses.

The school also maintains a close relationship with the Royal School Dungannon, James Dilworth's alma mater. Each year, four pupils (called 'Kiwis') go to Dungannon as tutors on scholarship. Likewise, four pupils from Dungannon travel to Auckland to work at Dilworth. This is part of a long-standing exchange programme between the two schools.

=== Police investigation of historic abuse ===
On 14 September 2020, six men were arrested and charged for historic sex and drug offences alleged to have taken place at the school from the 1970s to the early 2000s. These defendants included the school's former chaplain, Ross Douglas Browne, and two teachers. The police investigation was codenamed "Operation Beverly." On 16 September, a seventh man was charged with indecent assault in 1990 at the Auckland District Court.

On 10 October 2020, Stuff reported that the Royal Commission of Inquiry into Abuse in Care was looking into historical abuse that had occurred at Dilworth School and other Anglican institutions in New Zealand. Several former students registered to make submissions to the Royal Commission. On 7 December, a former Dilworth pupil testified to the Royal Commission, alleging that students were beaten by staff and senior students and likening the school's environment to the novel Lord of the Flies.

On 11 November 2020, former Assistant Principal Ian Wilson pleaded guilty to two charges involving indecent acts while working at Dilworth. Wilson had earlier been convicted of doing an indecent act with a boy under 12 years in 1996 while serving as Senior School Assistant Principal at MacMurray Boarding House. In late November, it was reported that a former 69-year old Scout Master, whose named was suppressed, facing charges of indecently assaulting a boy in the 1970s had died from cancer.

On 9 December, name suppression for one of the defendants, Rex McIntosh, was lifted. McIntosh faces three charges of indecent assault.

On 22 December, Detective Senior Sergeant Geoff Baber reported that an additional 80 victims had been identified and that 33 charges had been filed against five men aged between 68 and 78 as part of Operation Beverly. Baber confirmed that these new charges included allegations of indecency with boys under 16 years old, inducing a boy under 12 to do an indecent act, unlawful sexual connection, and indecent assault. That same day, Ian Wilson pleaded guilty to five charges of indecent assault including against two boys aged under 16 in the 1970s and a boy under 14 in 1992. Two other men facing charges include Ross Browne and Rex McIntosh.

On 10 February 2021, Police identified a former scout master who died before he could face two separate trials for historical sexual offending as Richard Charles Galloway.

On 23 March 2021, former assistant principal Ian Robert Wilson was sentenced by Judge Russell Collins at the Auckland District Court to three years and seven months in prison. Wilson had pleaded guilty to six charges of indecent assault and one of inducing a boy to do an indecent act.

On 14 May 2021, Police confirmed that a third man facing historical sexual abuse charges at Dilworth School had died. As a consequence, any charges the man faces will be withdrawn. Name suppression was subsequently lifted and the man was identified as former school tutor Keith William Dixon.

On 9 June 2021, Graeme Charles Lindsay admitted two counts of indecent assault against two complainants. Lindsay is one of eleven men who have so far been charged.

On 6 October 2021, former school chaplain Ross Douglas Browne pleaded guilty to sexually assaulting 16 boys under his care.

On 31 March 2022, former tutor Jonathan Peter Stephens was sentenced to six months' home detention, having earlier pleaded guilty to two charges of indecently assaulting a boy.

On 1 June 2022, former head of music Leonard Cave was found guilty of sexually abusing 4 boys in his care. Charges relating to a fifth boy were dismissed during the trial.

On 1 July 2022, former housemaster Alister Harlow was sentenced to three years and eight months in prison for sexually abusing students.

On 7 September 2022, name suppression was lifted on Robert Howard Gladwin Wynyard, former teacher and housemaster. He earlier pleaded guilty to 11 indecent assault charges.

Dilworth established a process for redress for historic physical and sexual abuse and budgeted $44 million to be paid out to up to 250 survivors. In 2024, it was reported that the school had revised upwards the number of former students entitled to redress and was subsequently expecting to pay out $55 million.

=== Cartwright inquiry into sexual and physical abuse ===
On 18 September 2023, an independent inquiry into sexual and physical abuse at Dilworth between 1950 and 2005 led by Dame Silvia Cartwright and Frances Joychild KC released its report. The 500-page report found that extensive sexual abuse, physical violence and bullying had occurred at the school for several decades; covered testimony about the alleged rape of pupils at the altar; that students who reported abuse to senior school staff were disbelieved, humiliated and caned; and that the school failed to refer reports of abuse to the Police. Cartwright and Joychild's inquiry concluded that "ongoing silence about the sexual abuse recorded in this report is the primary reason for the damage caused to many former students at Dilworth." The inquiry recorded 175 reports of sexual abuse and 134 reports of serious physical abuse, and noted that Police estimated 233 student victims. The inquiry found that students were extensively groomed and abused by tutors, housemasters, chaplains, teachers, scout volunteers, staff friends and associates, and friends of friends. Most of this sexual abuse occurred between the 1970s and 1990s. The report made 19 recommendations including collaborating and addressing the needs and grievances of survivors, retaining reports of abuse, recruiting quality staff, improving the quality of pastoral care, and improving engagement with the Police and Anglican Church.

=== Apology by Trust Board ===
A formal apology to students, staff, and their families was issued by the trust board chairman in March 2025. He apologised to survivors, to others who had died, to their families, to all past and present students who endured child sexual abuse and the associated stigma.

=== Class action ===
A class action complaint is currently underway against Dilworth School seeking accountability and compensation from the school for knowingly failing to protect students from systemic sexual abuse that occurred between 1970 and 2006. Survivors of this abuse are taking their claim to the Human Rights Commission.

The complaint aims to hold Dilworth accountable for its failure to protect students from the sexual abuse perpetrated by staff and representatives and, despite being aware of the abuse, allowing it to continue for over three decades. The survivors seek monetary compensation for breaches of the Human Rights Act 1993, as the sexual abuse they endured constitutes a form of sexual harassment in the context of education.

=== The Lost Boys of Dilworth ===
The Lost Boys of Dilworth is a docudrama that recounts how the school was revealed as a place where hundreds of boys were sexually abused by teachers, chaplains, tutors and housemasters. It was written and presented by former student and victim Mark Staufer and screened on TVNZ1 on 14 April 2024. Besides Staufer, the documentary also featured interviews with former Dilworth alumni Mat Stapleton, Vaughan Sexton and Paula Doherty, the sister of the late former student Sean Doherty.

== Campuses ==
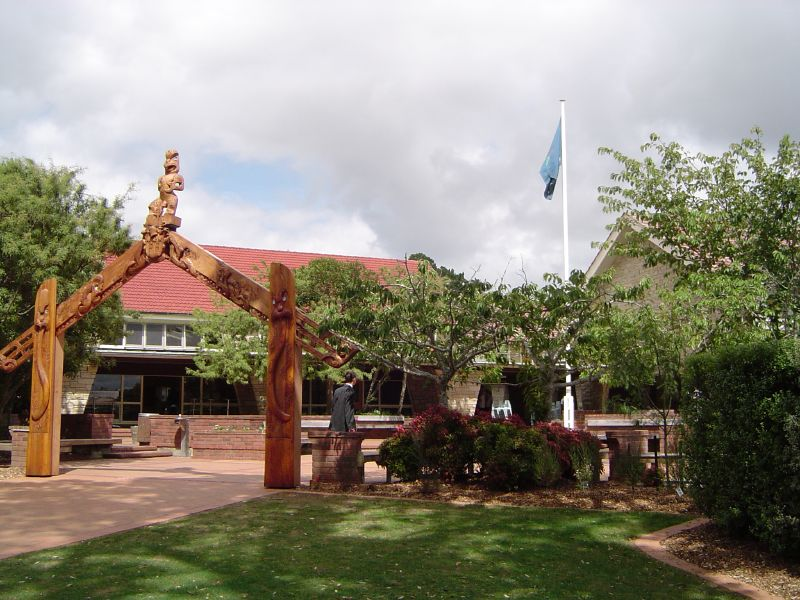
Senior Campus entrance.

Dilworth is organised on three separate campuses.

Senior Campus

The Senior Campus is located in Epsom, Auckland and accommodates up to 340 boys from Years 9–13. This is the school's flagship campus.

Junior Campus

The Junior Campus was opened in 1993 and is located in Remuera, Auckland. The campus accommodates 192 boys from Years 5–8.

Rural Campus – Te Haerenga

The new Rural Campus (sometimes called the 'Rural Campus – Te Haerenga (The Journey)') was officially opened in March 2012 after the Trust Board purchased the liquidated hotel and spa, Hotel du Vin. The campus – on 15 ha grounds in Mangatawhiri, south of Auckland – accommodates another 100 students in Year 9

== Trust Board ==
The Dilworth Trust Board is one of New Zealand's largest charities and provides the funding to support the Dilworth School.

The original endowment of 100,000 pounds left in 1894 by James Dilworth in his will has been invested wisely since then and now has grown to a diversified portfolio of investments. The Board still invests predominantly in property, and in particular, in the locality around the School but does hold a number of other investments including shares and bonds, both in New Zealand and overseas. The trust now holds approximately $957 million in assets and cash.

The beneficiaries of this trust are the boys who attend the School. The Board are precluded from assisting any other cause, however worthy it may be, and so this leads to a very focused Board and staff.

A duty of the Board is the granting and withdrawal of scholarships. Whilst staff provide significant input to the process, the final selection remains with the Trustees.

== Curriculum ==
The school curriculum is to provide an academic education by offering subjects that satisfy the seven learning areas of the New Zealand Framework, and thus offers the National Certificate of Educational Achievement (NCEA) Level One, Two & Three.

== Sports ==
The school holds multiple National and Auckland wrestling titles and for a time were the undisputed national powerhouse wrestling school in New Zealand. The school have produced a significant number of New Zealand Junior Representatives and a Junior Olympian since the program's inception in 1994.

Rugby is the most popular code at Dilworth. The school's 1st XV had been among the strongest teams in the Auckland 1B Championship for years, winning 49 out of their 52 games since 2011 and reaching 7 finals since 2000. They were finally crowned 1B Champions in 2012 and won the title again in 2013. In 2015, Dilworth made history by beating Onehunga High School, 12–10, in a 1A Championship promotion match and entered Auckland's top-flight for the first time in 109 years. In their debut 1A season, Dilworth finished 7th out of 12 teams, winning five of their 11 regular season games.

The 2017 season was a promising year for the college's 1st XV. Dilworth produced one of the biggest upsets in 1A history, beating 2016 National Champions and 2017 World Championship silver medallists, Mount Albert Grammar, 20–15. The win brought national attention to the college and took Dilworth to the top of the 1A table for the first time in the school's history. After respectable 2017 and 2018 campaigns avoiding relegation, a noteworthy feat for the league's smallest school with a roll of just over 300, in 2019, Dilworth finished the season in the drop zone. However, in their relegation match, they won emphatically, downing One Tree Hill 95–0 to secure a sixth consecutive berth in 1A rugby for 2020.

The school's basketball programme has also enjoyed success and defeated some of the country's powerhouse programs to be finalists in the Auckland Premier league in both 2007 and 2008.

== Demographic ==
As of July 2019, the Ministry of Education reported 68.9% of the school roll was Māori or Pasifika whilst 21.9% of pupils were European and 6.7% of Asian descent.

As of July 2026, Dilworth School has roll of 506 students, of which 21.1% are reported as Māori, 53.5% as Pasifika, 33.3% as Pākehā, and 18% as Asian. As a private school, the school is not assigned an Equity Index.

== Headmasters/principals ==
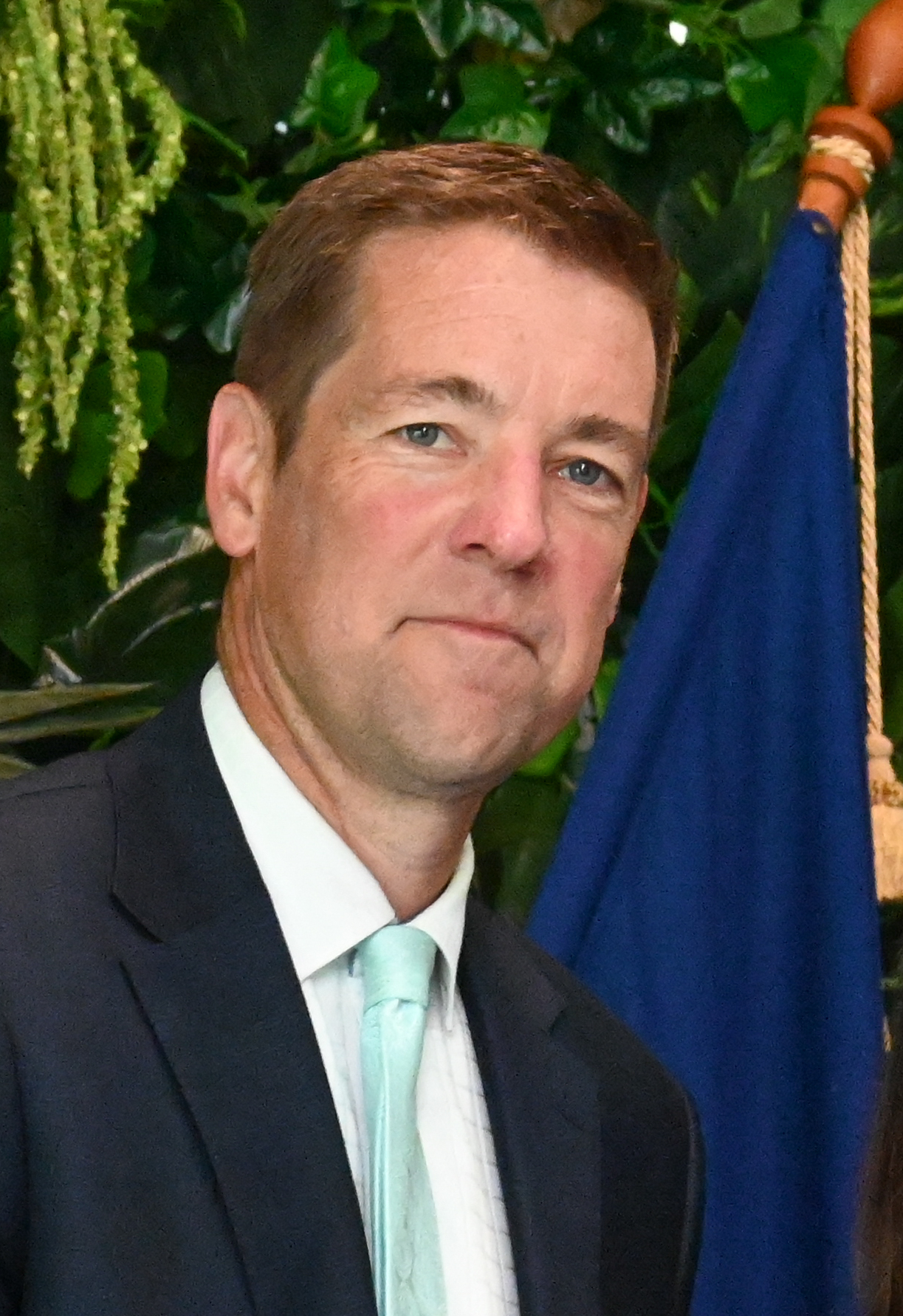
Dan Reddiex in 2022

The school had their first headmaster in 1908.

- C.F. Bourne 1908
- A. Plugge 1909–1914
- N.M.P. Gibson 1914–1945
- B.H. Wakelin 1946–1950
- J. Conolly 1950–1966
- R.G.P. Parr 1967–1979
- M.T. Wilton 1979–1997
- D. J. MacLean 1997–2018
- Dan Reddiex 2019–present

== Notable alumni ==
- David Aloua – professional boxer
- James Arlidge – Japan international, professional rugby union player
- Michael Bassett – Cabinet Minister in the Parliament of New Zealand
- Sir David Beattie – 14th Governor-General of New Zealand
- Colin Cole (1931–1987) – fashion designer
- Inga Finau (born 1994) – professional rugby union player
- Grayson Hart – Scotland international and professional rugby union player
- Jarrad Hoeata – All Black and professional rugby union player
- Riki Hoeata – professional rugby union player
- Fin Hoeata – professional rugby union player
- Jason Hoyte – actor and radio DJ
- Harry Lapwood OBE (1915–2007) – soldier and National Party politician.
- Brendhan Lovegrove – comedian
- Mike Moore – 34th Prime Minister of New Zealand and 6th Director-General of the World Trade Organization
- Mark Petrie – film composer
- Toni Pulu – professional rugby union player
- Elwyn Richardson QSO (1925–2012) – educator
- Jami-Lee Ross – former Member of Parliament
- Samson Setu (born 1994) – bass-baritone opera singer
- Mark Staufer – author and screenwriter
- Angus Ta'avao – All Black and professional rugby union player
- Shane Young (born 1993) – mixed martial artist
