= Arthur Plugge =

New Zealand Army officer

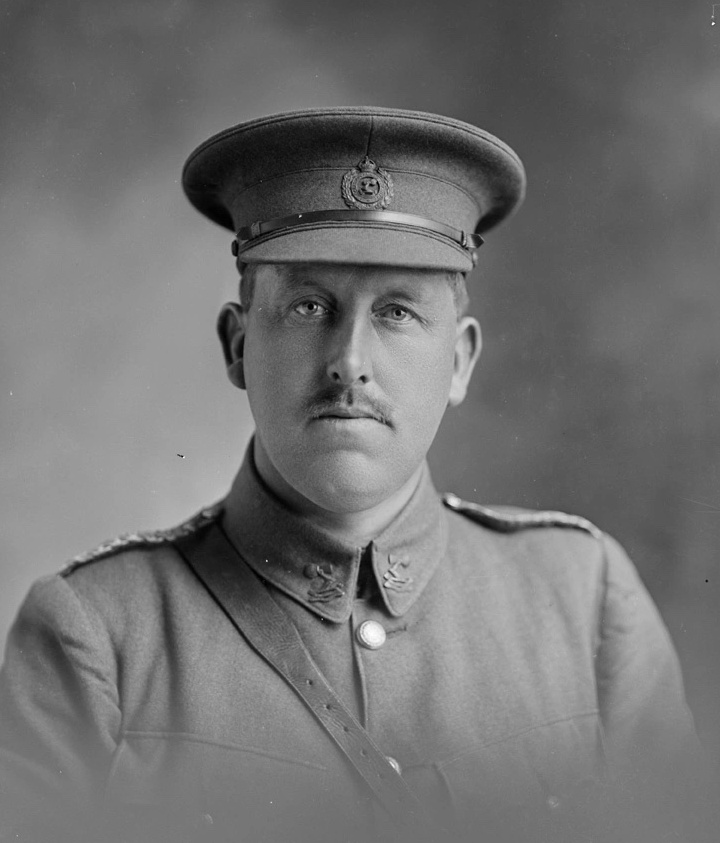
- Born: 17 February 1877; Hull, United Kingdom
- Died: 2 July 1934 (aged 57); Taupiri, New Zealand
- Military career
- Allegiance: New Zealand
- Branch: New Zealand Military Forces
- Rank: Lieutenant Colonel
- Commands: Auckland Infantry Battalion
- Conflicts: First World War; Gallipoli campaign; Western Front
- Awards: Order of St Michael and St George; Mentioned in Dispatches (2)

Lieutenant Colonel Arthur Plugge, CMG (/ˈplʌɡi/, (17 February 1877 – 2 July 1934), was an English-born officer who served during the First World War with the New Zealand Military Forces.

Born in Hull, Plugge emigrated to New Zealand in 1899. He worked as a teacher at Kings College in Auckland for a number of years before becoming headmaster at Dilworth Ulster Institute. He was involved in the New Zealand Territorial Force and following the outbreak of the First World War, he volunteered to serve in the New Zealand Expeditionary Force. As commanding officer of the Auckland Infantry Battalion, he was among the first New Zealanders to land at Gallipoli on 25 April 1915. He commanded a battalion for several months on the Western Front. He was relieved of his command in December 1916 and was the sports coordinator for the New Zealand Division for the remainder of the war.

In later life he farmed at Taupiri where he died at the age of 59. Plugge's Plateau Commonwealth War Graves Commission Cemetery is located on the hilltop where he established his headquarters on the day of the Gallipoli landing.

== Early life ==
Arthur Plugge was born in Hull, England, on 18 February 1877. The youngest son of J. P. Plugge, he was educated at Elmfield College in York, he subsequently attended Leeds University. Upon completing his education, he became a teacher at Archbishop Holgate's School in York. Emigrating to New Zealand in 1899, he taught science at Kings College in Auckland. He subsequently became headmaster at another Auckland school, Dilworth Ulster Institute. He was actively involved in the Territorial Force, serving with the 3rd Auckland Regiment as a major.

== First World War ==
Following the outbreak of the First World War, Plugge volunteered for the New Zealand Expeditionary Force (NZEF). A major in the Territorial Force, he was promoted to lieutenant colonel and placed in command of the Auckland Infantry Battalion, which was formed from one company each of four territorial regiments and had the first serial number, 12/1, on its roll. He was not particularly popular as a commander, being regarded as an amiable but weak leader, and reportedly favoured the company drawn from his territorial regiment.

=== Gallipoli ===
Plugge's battalion arrived in Egypt on 3 December 1914 and from there were the first New Zealand troops to land at ANZAC Cove on 25 April 1915. Upon landing, Plugge positioned his battalion headquarters at the top of a hill just inshore from the Cove. The hill was consequently given the name Plugge's Plateau by the invading troops, and after the war, Plugge's Plateau Commonwealth War Graves Commission Cemetery was established on the hilltop. During the day's action, Plugge was lightly wounded in the wrist by a shell fragment. He was wounded again a few weeks later on 8 May, during the Second Battle of Krithia. For his work during the landings of 25 April, he was mentioned in despatches for the first time when General Ian Hamilton's report of 20 May was published in The London Gazette.

Plugge was evacuated to Malta for medical treatment, and here he contracted malaria which necessitated his transfer to England for treatment. After recovering his health, he was returned to his command in Gallipoli, leading his battalion during the evacuation from the peninsula. He was again mentioned in despatches and appointed to the Order of St Michael and St George in October 1915, for his services during the Gallipoli campaign.

=== Western Front ===
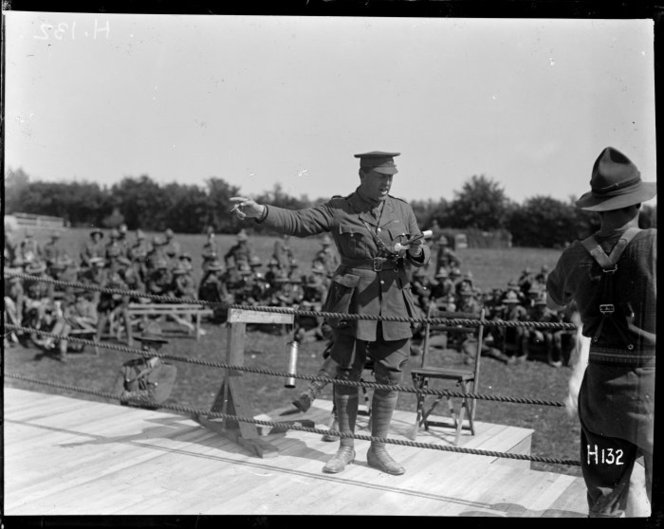
Lieutenant Colonel Plugge, OC Recreation, standing in the ring at the New Zealand Division boxing championships held in Doulieu, France

When the New Zealand Division was being formed in early 1916 in Egypt, following the conclusion of the Gallipoli Campaign, Plugge was made commander of the 1st Auckland Infantry Battalion, which was part of the 1st New Zealand Infantry Brigade. The New Zealand Division proceeded to the Western Front and in September, Plugge led the battalion during the Battle of the Somme. At the end of the year, following a reorganisation of the division, he was removed from his command by the divisional commander, Major General Andrew Russell. Russell was unhappy with Plugge's performance as a battalion commander; his command had a high desertion rate relative to other units of the New Zealand Division.

In light of his Gallipoli service, Plugge was not returned to New Zealand. Instead, he was allowed to remain with the division as its sports coordinator. The commander of the NZEF, Lieutenant General Alexander Godley believed that Plugge became a negative influence within the New Zealand Division as a result of being overlooked for a brigade command. Regardless, it transpired that Plugge excelled in his new role. Russell recognised the importance of sport for the morale and well-being of the soldiers under his command and Plugge promoted participation in organised sporting events. He remained in the position until he was discharged from the NZEF on 18 June 1918.

== Later life ==
On his return to New Zealand, Plugge took up dairy farming at Taupiri, near Huntly. He also maintained an involvement with the School Cadet Corps and the Boy Scouts. He died on 2 July 1934 at the age of 57. He was buried in Taupiri Cemetery with military honours with a number of notable former and current soldiers present, among them Major General George Spafford Richardson and Colonel John Evelyn Duigan. He was survived by his wife, Millicent, and three children. A son, John, had been killed in a flying accident with the Royal Air Force just two months earlier.
