= Plugge's Plateau Commonwealth War Graves Commission Cemetery =

WWI CWGC cemetery in Gallipoli, Turkey

Coordinates: 40°14′15″N 26°16′49″E

Plugge's Plateau
- Commonwealth War Graves Commission
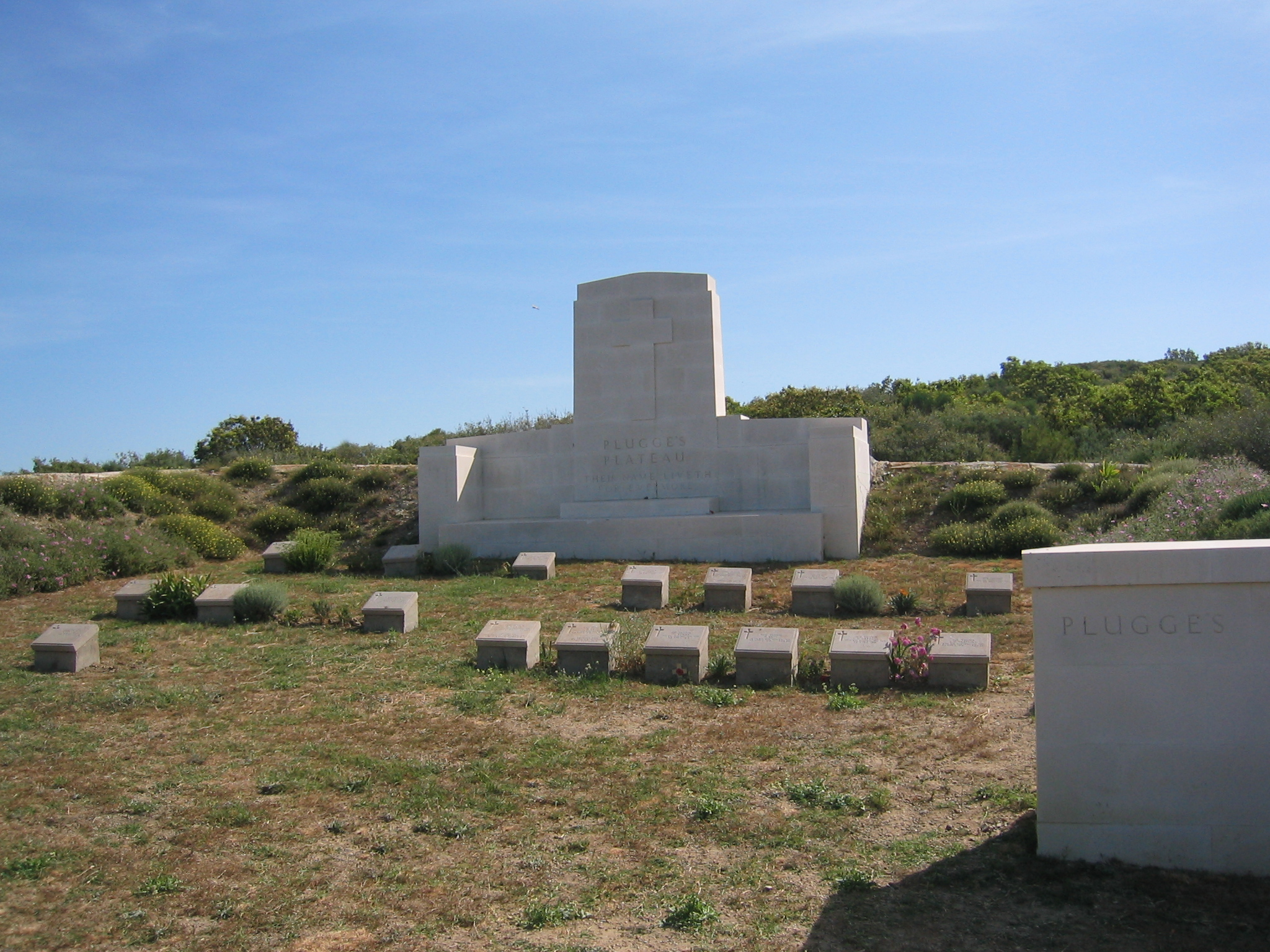
- Used for those deceased April–May 1915
- Established: 1915
- Location: near Gallipoli, Turkey
- Designed by: Sir John Burnet
- Total burials: 21
- Unknowns: 5

Burials by nation
- Allied Powers: Australian: 12; New Zealand: 8

Burials by war
- World War I: 21

Plugge's Plateau Cemetery is the smallest Commonwealth War Graves Commission cemetery on the Gallipoli Peninsula in Turkey. It contains some of soldiers killed during World War I during the battles at Gallipoli, was an eight-month campaign fought by Commonwealth and French forces against Turkish forces in an attempt to force Turkey out of the war, to relieve the deadlock of the Western Front (France/Belgium) and to open a supply route to Russia through the Dardanelles and the Black Sea.

Plugge's Plateau was located at the top of a steep 100 metre hill overlooking ANZAC Cove and Shrapnel Valley and was captured on 25 April 1915 shortly after the landing, by the 11th Battalion, 3rd Brigade of the AIF.

The plateau was later named by the invading troops after 37-year-old Lieutenant Colonel Arthur Plugge commanding officer of the Auckland Infantry Battalion of the New Zealand Expeditionary Force, who established his headquarters there.

It became a strongpoint within the ANZAC Inner Defence Line and the ANZAC headquarters were constructed lower down on the seaward side of the hill. An artillery position and a water reservoir were also sited on it. The Turkish forces named it Hain Tepe (Treacherous Hill) because of the effect of the artillery battery located on it. The cemetery is located on the North-West corner, and of the identified remains 12 are troops killed on the day of the landing and the rest are from nearby field artillery positions.
