= John Bryce =

New Zealand politician

The Honourable John Bryce
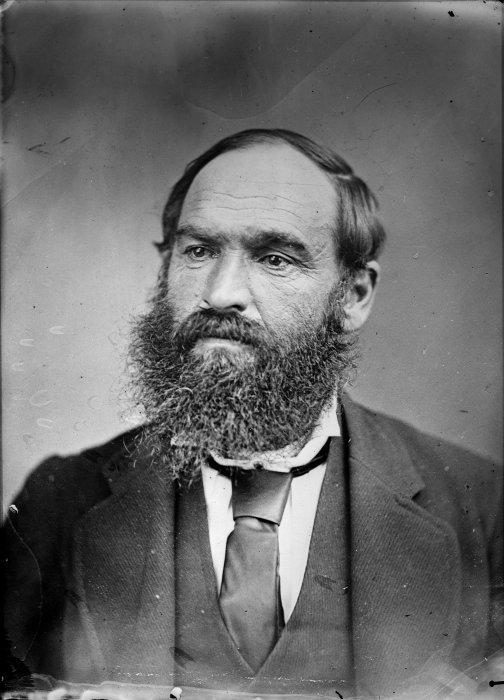
- Bryce, c. 1870s

2nd Leader of the Opposition
- In office 23 January 1891 – 31 August 1891
- Prime Minister: John Ballance
- Preceded by: John Ballance
- Succeeded by: William Rolleston

11th Minister of Native Affairs
- In office 19 October 1881 – 16 August 1884
- Prime Minister: John Hall; Frederick Whitaker; Harry Atkinson
- Preceded by: William Rolleston
- Succeeded by: John Ballance
- In office 8 October 1879 – 21 January 1881
- Prime Minister: John Hall
- Preceded by: John Sheehan
- Succeeded by: William Rolleston

Member of the New Zealand Parliament for Waikato
- In office 5 December 1890 – 31 August 1891
- Preceded by: John Blair Whyte
- Succeeded by: Edward Lake

Member of the New Zealand Parliament for Waipa
- In office 21 November 1889 – 5 December 1890
- Preceded by: William Jackson

Member of the New Zealand Parliament for Waitotara
- In office 9 December 1881 – 26 September 1887
- Succeeded by: George Hutchison

Member of the New Zealand Parliament for Wanganui
- In office 30 January 1871 – 9 December 1881
- In office 3 March 1866 – February 1867

Personal details
- Born: 14 September 1833 Glasgow, Scotland
- Died: 17 January 1913 (aged 79) Wanganui, New Zealand
- Spouse: Anne Campbell (m. 1854)
- Children: 14
- Occupation: Farmer

John Bryce (14 September 1833 – 17 January 1913) was a New Zealand politician from 1871 to 1891 and Minister of Native Affairs from 1879 to 1884. In his attitudes to Māori land questions, he favoured strict legal actions against Māori opposed to alienation, and he directed the invasion of Parihaka and the arrest of the movement's leaders.

Described as stubborn and embittered to Māori questions, Bryce was the public face of a harsh policy towards Māori, but the Premier and other cabinet members supported his actions.

== Early life ==
John Bryce arrived in New Zealand as a child in 1840 and had little formal education.

After a short time in the Australian gold-fields in 1851, he purchased a farm near Wanganui and remained a farmer for the next fifty years.

== Early political career ==
New Zealand Parliament
Years	Term	Electorate	Party
1866–1867	4th	Wanganui	Independent
1871–1876	5th	Wanganui	Independent
1876–1879	6th	Wanganui	Independent
1879–1881	7th	Wanganui	Independent
1881–1884	8th	Waitotara	Independent
1884–1887	9th	Waitotara	Independent
1889–1890	10th	Waipa	Independent
1890–1891	11th	Waikato	Conservative

In 1859, Bryce started his political career. By 1862 he was representing his area in the Wellington Provincial Council, and by 1866 was the Member of Parliament (MP) for Wanganui, a position he held for only a year before resigning due to ill-health.

== Titokowaru's War ==
When settlers were threatened by Māori led by Tītokowaru in 1867, Bryce volunteered and became a lieutenant in the Kai-iwi Yeomanry Cavalry Volunteers. Bryce was proud of his commission, but an incident at William Handley's woolshed in November 1868 clouded his military career. Initially, it was reported as an attack on a band of Hauhau warriors, killing two and wounding others, and where Bryce was "prominent and set the men a gallant example", according to his commanding officer. Later reports had the Māori as a group of unarmed boys aged from ten to twelve.

The incident in which Bryce was alleged to have taken part was reported as an attack on women and children in the "History of New Zealand" published in 1883 and led to a successful libel action against the publisher George William Rusden. Ex-Governor Arthur Hamilton-Gordon supported publisher Rusden, but when the case went to trial, Bryce won and was awarded damages as it was proved no women were present at Handley's woolshed, and Bryce denied being directly involved. Gordon's involvement and the damaging trial publicity delayed his elevation to the British peerage.

== Minister of Native Affairs ==
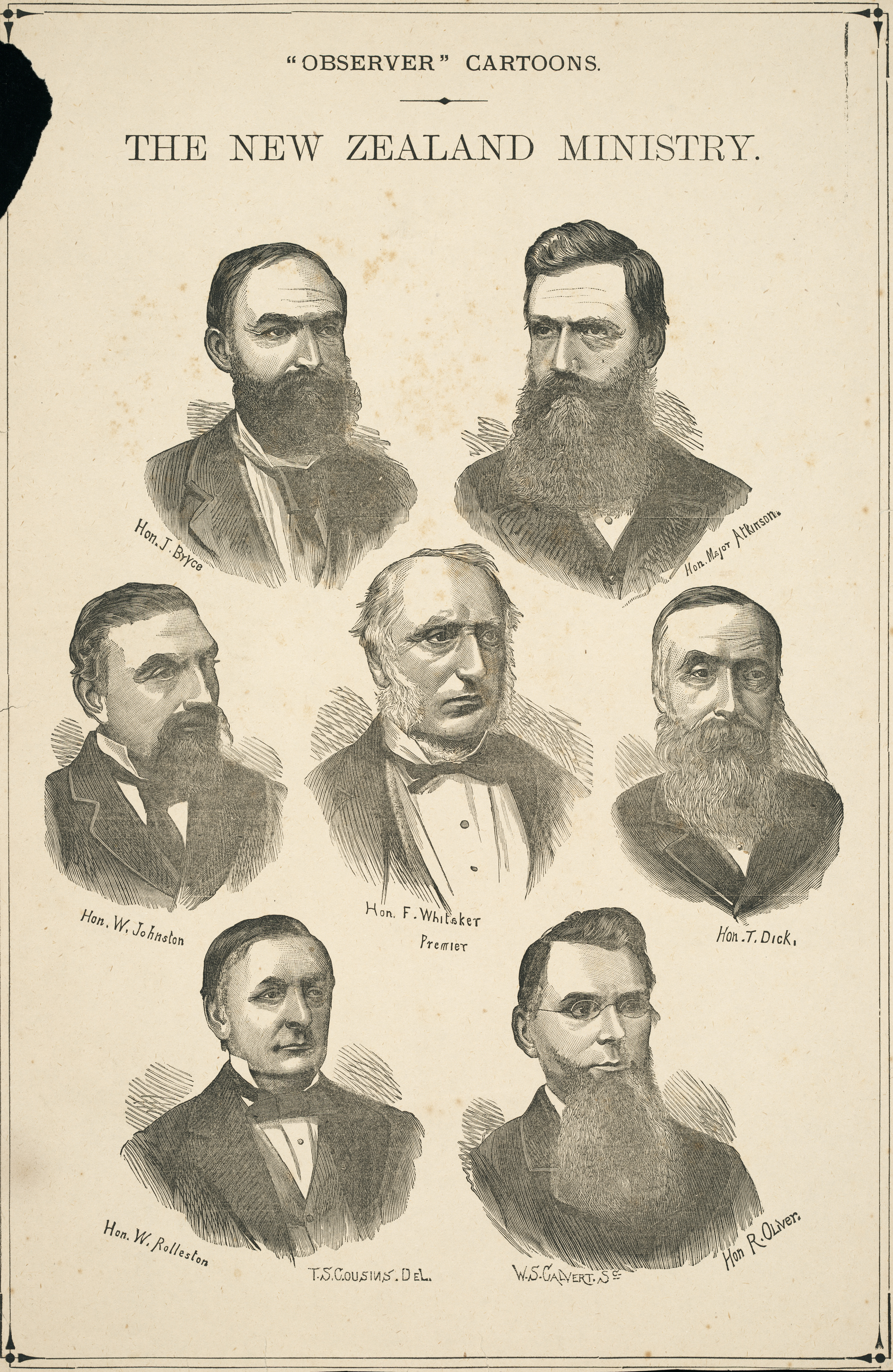
Bryce (top left) in a cartoon depiction of the Whitaker Ministry

In 1871, Bryce was back in Parliament as MP for Wanganui to 1881, and then MP for Waitotara until 1887. From 1876 to 1879, he chaired the Native Affairs Committee and, between 1879 and 1883, was the Minister of Native Affairs. He expanded the powers of the Native Land Court to facilitate the sale of Māori land, reduced the scope of the Native Department, and enforced the law against any Māori resisting land confiscation and sales. These actions made him deeply unpopular with Māori, and Bishop Octavius Hadfield reported that west coast Māori called him Bryce kohuru (Bryce the murderer).

=== Parihaka ===
The alienation of Taranaki land was challenged by Te Whiti o Rongomai and Tohu Kākahi at Parihaka, and their followers cultivated and planted confiscated land. When Bryce became Minister in 1879, two hundred Māori ploughmen were already imprisoned, and his introduction of the Confiscated Lands Inquiry and Maori Prisoners' Trials Act in 1879 allowed them to stay in prison awaiting trial for up to two years. By January 1881, his actions were being questioned in the British parliament, and he resigned to be replaced by the more moderate William Rolleston.

Rolleston was to be Native Minister only until October 1881. In his last act, he proclaimed that Parihaka inhabitants had fourteen days to comply with the law or face confiscation of all their lands. Bryce became Native Minister, and on 5 November 1881, he was at Parihaka at the head of 1,600 Armed Constabulary to arrest the leaders and disperse the village.

In April 1882, Premier John Hall privately criticised Bryce to the Attorney General and said he would resign 'unless Bryce turned over a new leaf'. When Bryce heard of this, he resigned, and the Hall Government fell. Bryce was re-appointed Native Minister under Premiers Frederick Whitaker and Harry Atkinson from 1882 to 1884.

Bryce lost his Waitotara seat in 1887. In 1889, Bryce was re-elected, this time to Waipa, and then in 1890 to Waikato. Some of his parliamentary supporters considered him a possible replacement for Premier Harry Atkinson. Briefly, he was Leader of the Opposition, but resigned from parliament in 1891 for refusing to withdraw his criticism of the Premier. The Speaker, William Steward, ruled the criticism unparliamentary. When Bryce refused to withdraw the words, "the House passed a vote of censure on him for not obeying the chair. He left the chamber, and never came back."

== Footnotes ==
Political offices
Preceded by John Sheehan	Minister of Native Affairs; 1879–1881 1881–1884	Succeeded by William Rolleston
Preceded by William Rolleston	Minister of Native Affairs; 1879–1881 1881–1884	Succeeded by John Ballance
Preceded by John Ballance	Leader of the Opposition; 1891	Succeeded by William Rolleston
New Zealand Parliament
Preceded by Henry Shafto Harrison	Member of Parliament for Wanganui; 1866–1867; 1871–1881 serving alongside William Fox and John Ballance	Succeeded by Henry Shafto Harrison
Preceded by Henry Shafto Harrison	Member of Parliament for Wanganui; 1866–1867; 1871–1881 serving alongside William Fox and John Ballance	Succeeded by William Hogg Watt
New constituency	Member of Parliament for Waitotara; 1881–1887	Succeeded by George Hutchison
Preceded by William Jackson	Member of Parliament for Waipa; 1889–1890	Vacant Constituency abolished, recreated in 1893 Title next held by Frederic Lang
Preceded by John Blair Whyte	Member of Parliament for Waikato; 1890–1891	Succeeded by Edward Lake
