= Alfred Cox (politician) =

New Zealand politician (1825–1911)

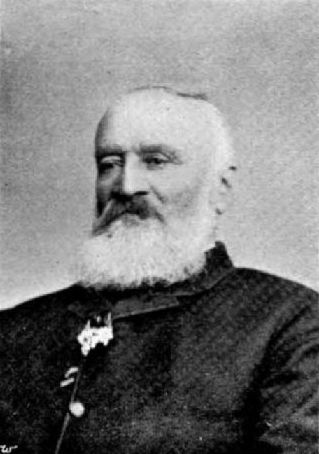
- Portrait of Alfred Cox

Member of the New Zealand Parliament for Heathcote
- In office 28 October 1863 – 27 January 1866
- Preceded by: William Sefton Moorhouse
- Succeeded by: John Hall

Member of the New Zealand Parliament for Timaru
- In office 20 February 1866 – 14 October 1868
- Preceded by: Francis Jollie
- Succeeded by: Edward Stafford

Member of the New Zealand Parliament for Waipa
- In office 11 January 1876 – 13 June 1878
- Preceded by: new constituency
- Succeeded by: Edward Graham McMinn

Personal details
- Born: 23 June 1825 Clarendon, New South Wales, Australia
- Died: 23 May 1911 (aged 85) St Albans, Christchurch, New Zealand
- Spouse: Mary Macpherson (m. 1849; died 1899)
- Relations: William Cox (father); Ernest Gray (brother-in-law); Frederick Alexander Whitaker (son-in-law)
- Occupation: runholder, politician

Alfred Cox (3 June 1825 – 23 May 1911) was a 19th-century runholder and Member of the New Zealand House of Representatives. Born in New South Wales into an upper middle class military family, he was sent home to England to learn about farming. Upon returning to New South Wales, he heard about the large profits that were possible in South Canterbury and bought licences for land that he had not seen. He stocked the land, put a manager in charge and made another trip to England with his wife and their, at that time, small family. He moved to New Zealand permanently in 1857 and lived on his large farm, Raukapuka, which stretched from the sea to the foothills, and of which the homestead was located in present-day Geraldine. He sold his South Canterbury interests and moved to the Waikato, where he bought large land holdings in Hamilton and Thames. He tried to drain his swamp land and lost a lot of money with those ventures. He sold up in 1882 and moved to Christchurch, where he retired.

He became politically active in South Canterbury and represented the area first in the Canterbury Provincial Council and then in the House of Representatives. He was the driving force behind the establishment of some of the South Canterbury local bodies. During his time in the Waikato, he represented a local electorate in the House of Representatives. He resigned due to ill health and later tried to re-establish his parliamentary career in a South Canterbury electorate, but was beaten by William Rolleston.

== Early life ==
Cox was born in 1825 in Clarendon, New South Wales. His father was William Cox, an English soldier, known as an explorer, road builder and pioneer in the early period of British settlement in Australia. His mother was Anna Blachford, his father's second wife. Cox received his education at The King's School in Parramatta. As a teenager, he attended the funeral of Samuel Marsden in Parramatta.

Cox had Samuel Wallace, the father of William Vincent Wallace, as his music teacher, and he developed into an accomplished musician. From 1844 to 1847, he spend time in England to learn about farming. He visited Ireland and saw the dire consequences of the Great Famine.

After his return, he married Mary Macpherson, a daughter of Lieutenant-colonel Ewan Macpherson, on 26 November 1849. Her father was stationed with the 99th Regiment of Foot in Tasmania at the time. Her sister married Ernest Gray. Like Cox, his wife was a good flute player. She also played the piano, and they often entertained guests with musical performances.

== Farming ==
Cox had a farm in Windsor, New South Wales. In 1854, he learned that made profits were made by selling stock, especially sheep, to New Zealand. In Sydney, he purchased two licences for unstocked grazing runs in South Canterbury from Muter and Francis. He met John Cracroft Wilson, who was in search of a healthier climate, and encouraged him to also settle in Canterbury. Wilson purchased sheep and cattle in Sydney, and took them to Lyttelton in the Akbar. With the help of his brother-in-law and others, Cox brought his stock to New Zealand on the Admiral Grenfell, which landed in Lyttelton on 12 March 1854. The group returned the following month to Sydney on the Tory to get another shipment of stock. On their return, they drove the stock from Christchurch to the land that he had named Raukapuka. Cox left William du Moulin in charge and returned to Australia.

In 1855, the Cox family visited England. He was not to see his land again until 1857, when he permanently settled in New Zealand. He spent some time improving the living conditions before he brought his wife and family out to Raukapuka.

The original licences bought from Muter and Francis, which were originally known as runs 18 and 31, covered 40,000 acres (160 km^{2}). Run 43 covering 26,000 acres (110 km^{2}) was added to this; the land was purchased from George Duppa. Raukapuka was located between the Orari and Hae Hae Te Moana Rivers, the coast, and the foothills. The settlements of Geraldine, Winchester, Pleasant Valley, and Woodbury are located on land originally owned by Cox. Raukapuka Recreation Reserve in Geraldine, partly under the management by the Department of Conservation, commemorates the early ownership. Cox sold Raukapuka in 1870, either to Sir Thomas Tancred (the eldest brother of Henry Tancred) or his son, Selby Tancred. The original homestead was located near Geraldine, and the area was incorporated into the town in 1953.

Cox first visited the interior of the North Island in 1867 and became interested in farming there. Together with James Williamson, he visited land owned by Williamson in the Waikato region. Cox engaged architect Isaac R. Vialou to design a house on the shore of Lake Rotoroa in Hamilton. It was the homestead of the Rukuhia Estate, which originally measured 6,000 hectares (60 km^{2}) and which he owned with Williamson. Cox lived in Lake House at 102 Lake Crescent from 1873 until 1879. The house is registered with Heritage New Zealand as a Category II heritage structure.

Cox bought swamp land in the Thames District. The capital expenditure for draining the land was large, and Cox lost a lot of money through this venture. He sold his holdings in 1882 and moved to St Albans in Christchurch, where he spent his remaining life.

== Political career ==
New Zealand Parliament
Years	Term	Electorate	Party
1863–1866	3rd	Heathcote	Independent
1866–1868	4th	Timaru	Independent
1876–1878	6th	Waipa	Independent

Cox was first elected to the Canterbury Provincial Council in May 1862 for the Geraldine electorate and served until October 1864, when he resigned due to increasing parliamentary duties. He was then elected for the Papanui electorate and served from May 1870 to August 1871. From October 1870 to August 1871, he served on the Canterbury Executive Council. In February 1864, he was elected the first chairman of the Geraldine Road Board. In late 1867, he became a member of the first Timaru and Gladstone Board of Works.

Cox represented the Heathcote electorate from 1863 to 1866 (elected 28 October; dissolved 27 January), then the Timaru electorate from 1866 to 1868 (elected 20 February; resigned 14 October). He then represented the Waipa electorate in the Waikato region from 1876 to 1878 (elected 11 January; resigned 13 June).

When he represented Timaru, there was much dissatisfaction in South Canterbury about the area not getting its share from the provincial government that it was due. There were numerous calls for separation of South Canterbury from the Canterbury Province, but Cox was opposed to it. Instead, he had legislation passed in parliament that enabled the establishment of the Timaru and Gladstone Board of Works, which took over some of the functions of the provincial council, and had its assured income.

He resigned in 1878 due to ill health and increasing deafness.

In the 1884 election, he contested the Geraldine electorate, but was beaten by William Rolleston.

== Later life and family ==
His wife's parents lived with them in Raukapuka. Her father died in 1859 in Christchurch and was buried at Riccarton Cemetery. Her mother moved with them to subsequent homes and died in November 1898 when the family lived in St Albans.

Alfred and Mary Cox had four sons and nine daughters. Their first two children were born in Windsor, their third child was born in 1855 while they were in Cheltenham, England. Their fourth child was born in 1857 in Parramatta. All subsequent children were born in New Zealand, the first of them were twin girls in 1859. The twins had a double wedding at Riverslea farm in South Canterbury on 30 September 1879, three days after their 20th birthday: Kate married Frederick Alexander Whitaker, the eldest son of New Zealand's 5th Premier, Frederick Whitaker (her husband had earlier that month been first elected to Parliament), and Marian married Francis H. Barker, the fourth son of the late Dr Alfred Charles Barker.

Two of their sons died in 1893 within six weeks, and they were both buried at Temuka cemetery near Raukapuka. His wife died on 2 August 1899; at the time, they were living in Office Road in St Albans. She was buried at St Paul's Anglican Church in Papanui.

Cox's last home was in Constance Street in St Albans; the street was renamed to Stirling Street in 1948. The adjacent street, Cox Street, was named in his honour in 1892. He died at his residence on 23 May 1911 and was buried at St Paul's Anglican Church next to his wife.

== Bibliography ==
Cox was the author of Recollections (1884), and Men of Mark of New Zealand (1886).

== Notes ==
New Zealand Parliament
Preceded by William Sefton Moorhouse	Member of Parliament for Heathcote; 1863–1866	Succeeded by John Hall
Preceded by Francis Jollie	Member of Parliament for Timaru; 1866–1868	Succeeded by Edward Stafford
New constituency	Member of Parliament for Waipa; 1876–1878	Succeeded by Edward Graham McMinn
