= Karapiro (electorate) =

Karapiro was a New Zealand parliamentary electorate from 1996 to 2002.

It was in the Waikato, and was a rural and safe National seat, held first by John Luxton and then by Lindsay Tisch.

== Population centres ==
The 1996 election was notable for the significant change of electorate boundaries, based on the provisions of the Electoral Act 1993. Because of the introduction of the mixed-member proportional (MMP) electoral system, the number of electorates had to be reduced, leading to significant changes. More than half of the electorates contested in 1996 were newly constituted, and most of the remainder had seen significant boundary changes. In total, 73 electorates were abolished, 29 electorates were newly created (including Karapiro), and 10 electorates were recreated, giving a net loss of 34 electorates.

The electorate includes the following population centres:

- Cambridge
- Matamata
- Morrinsville

== History ==
Karapiro was created as an electorate in the first MMP general election of 1996, replacing the Matamata electorate. John Luxton won the electorate in 1996, but he stood aside in 1999 for Lindsay Tisch, and went on the party list.

In the 2002 general election it was replaced by the Piako electorate, which was won by Lindsay Tisch.

=== Members of Parliament ===
Key

National

Election	Winner
1996 election	John Luxton
1999 election	Lindsay Tisch

== Election results ==
=== 1999 election ===
Refer to Candidates in the New Zealand general election 1999 by electorate#Karapiro for a list of candidates.

=== 1996 election ===
1996 general election: Karapiro
Notes:	Blue background denotes the winner of the electorate vote. Pink background denotes a candidate elected from their party list. Yellow background denotes an electorate win by a list member, or other incumbent. A ✓ or ✗ denotes status of any incumbent, win or lose respectively.						
Party	Candidate	Votes	%	±%	Party votes	%	±%
National	John Luxton	14,893	46.52		13,713	42.68	
Labour	Sue Moroney	5,526	17.26		5,778	17.98	
NZ First	Clive Mortensen	4,898	15.30		5,230	16.28	
Alliance	John Kilbride	3,245	10.14		2,385	7.42	
ACT	Vince Ashwort	1,561	4.88		2,446	7.61	
Christian Coalition	Philip Holdway-Davis	1,055	3.30		1,650	5.14	
United NZ	Tim Macindoe	408	1.27		280	0.87	
McGillicuddy Serious	Craig Beere	296	0.92		86	0.27	
Natural Law	Belinda Hills	78	0.24		50	0.16	
Mana Māori	Lai Toy	52	0.16		14	0.04	
Legalise Cannabis					317	0.99	
Animals First					57	0.18	
Progressive Green					50	0.16	
Green Society					22	0.07	
Superannuitants & Youth					21	0.07	
Conservatives					10	0.03	
Libertarianz					10	0.03	
Advance New Zealand					8	0.02	
Ethnic Minority Party					5	0.02	
Asia Pacific United					0	0.00	
Te Tawharau					0	0.00	
Informal votes		205			85		
Total valid votes		32,012			32,132		
National win new seat	Majority	9,367	29.26				
