= Ohinetahi =

- Ōhinetahi
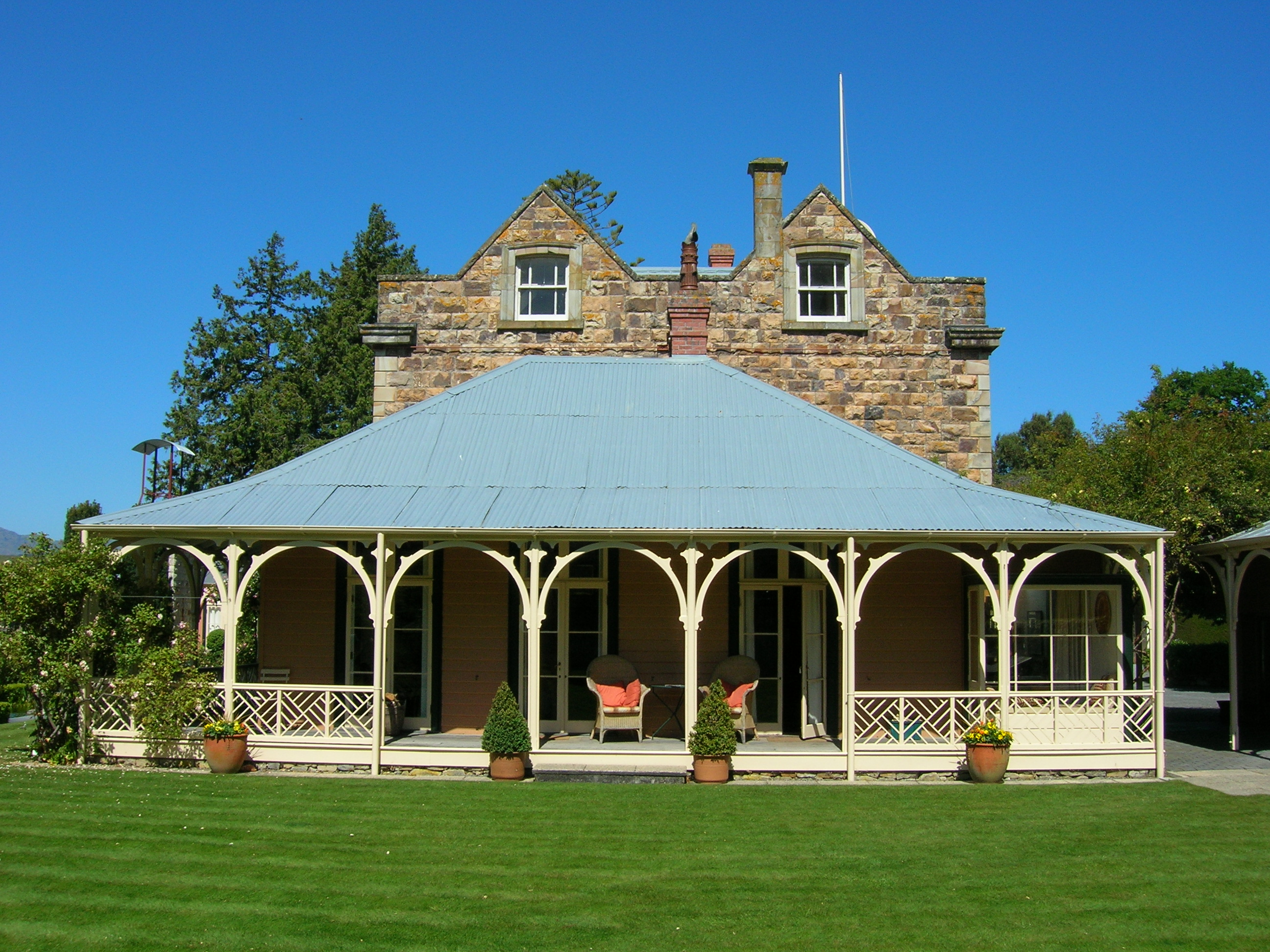
- Ohinetahi Homestead in 2005

General information
- Type: Homestead
- Location: Governors Bay, 31 Governors Bay Teddington Road,, Allandale, Christchurch, New Zealand
- Coordinates: 43.6351°S 172.6462°E
- Completed: 1867
- Owner: Ohinetahi Charitable Trust

Technical details
- Floor count: two

Heritage New Zealand – Category 1
- Designated: 28 June 1990
- Reference no.: 3349

References
- "Ohinetahi". New Zealand Heritage List/Rārangi Kōrero. Heritage New Zealand.

Ohinetahi (Māori: Ōhinetahi: "The Place of One Daughter") is a valley, historic homestead, and formal garden on Teddington Road, Governors Bay, Christchurch, Canterbury region, New Zealand. Ohinetahi valley is situated at the head of Lyttelton Harbour, at the base of the Port Hills. While the Ohinetahi Homestead is considered to be a significant historic building in the small settlement of Governors Bay, the formal garden of Ohinetahi is considered to be one of New Zealand's finest. Amongst the early owners of Ohinetahi were Canterbury pioneer William Sefton Moorhouse and Thomas Potts, New Zealand's first conservationist. Sir Miles Warren, architect of the Christchurch Town Hall, was the last private owner, and gifted it to New Zealand.

== Etymology ==
Ohinetahi was the site of a heavily fortified Ngāti Māmoe pā. Approximately 300 years ago, it was overtaken by Te Rakiwhakaputa of Ngāi Tahu. After the pā's capture, Manuhiri, son of Te Rakiwhakaputa, resided here, fathering many sons and one daughter after whom the pā is named.

== History ==
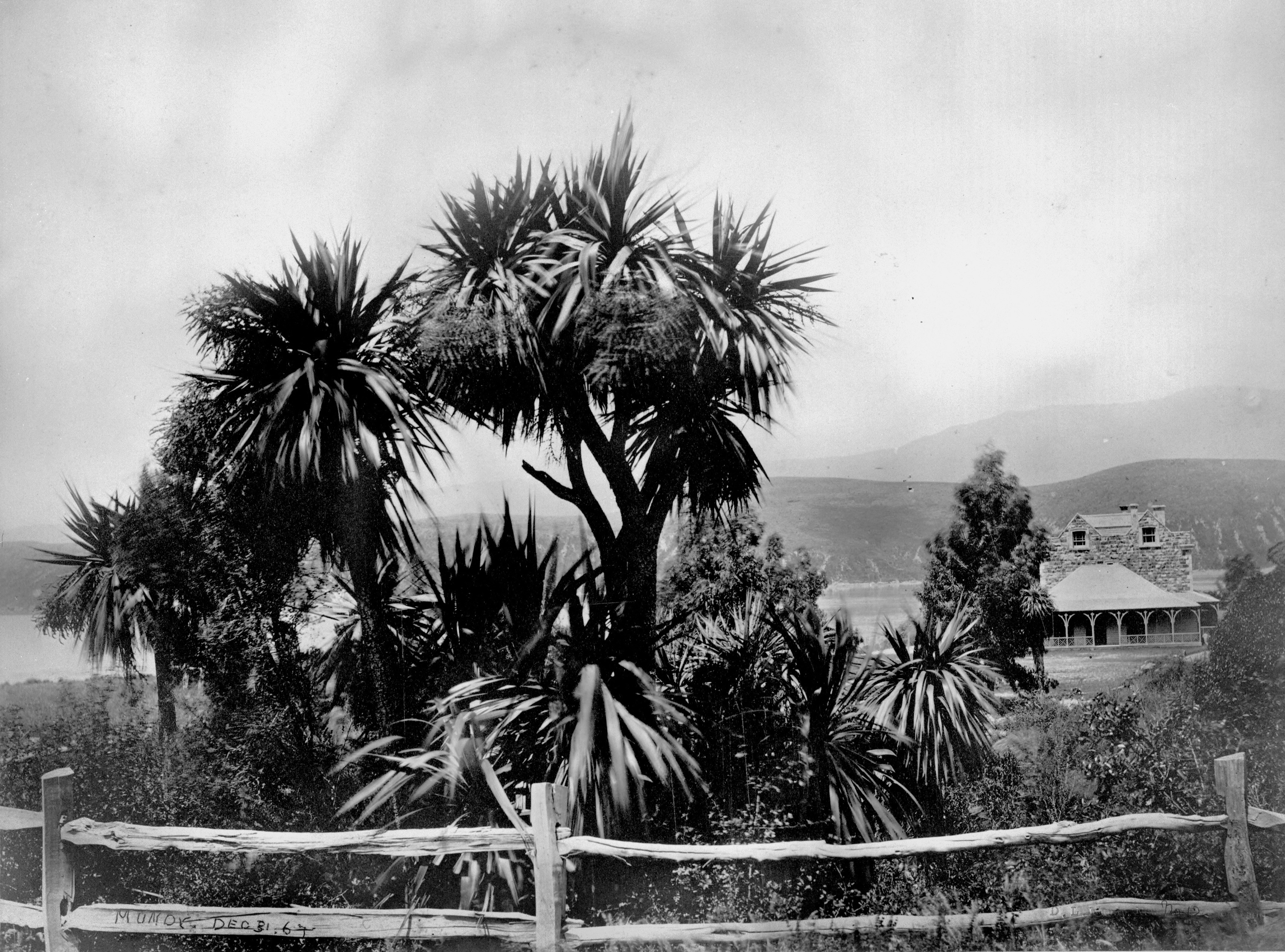
Ohinetahi in 1867 while owned by Thomas Potts

=== Establishment and early owners ===
The first European owner of the land was Christopher Alderson Calvert (1811–1883), a lawyer practicing in Lyttelton and Christchurch who purchased the land in 1852. He had a one-room cottage designed by Benjamin J. Mountfort and built in Lyttelton before it was transported in sections by boat and carried up to the site. He named the cottage Rosemary Cottage after one of Bishop Selwyn's daughters. On consulting local Maori about a name for the property, they suggested and he was delighted to adopt the name, Ohinetahi. Four subsequent owners followed in a short period of time before William Sefton Moorhouse purchased the property in the mid-1850s. Moorhouse then built a more substantial building either by adding rooms onto each end of the existing cottage or more likely by replacing it with an entirely new house. Moorhouse sold the entire 255-acre property to Thomas Potts in 1858. Potts proceeded to buy more of the surrounding land until the property covered 572 acres, reaching as far as the seashore at Governors Bay, along the main road as well as Quail island. Between 1863 and 1867 Potts pulled the existing house apart and built a three-story sandstone structure between the two wooden halves.

Potts, one of New Zealand's earliest conservationists, established in 1865 a large garden on the property which as well as a vegetable garden and orchard included trees such as araucarias, ashes, blue gums, Lombardy poplars, New World conifers, oaks, sycamores and walnuts. The variety of exotic trees and shrubs that Potts selected were on the advice of a friend at Kew Garden. Pott's four hectare garden included a quince and variegated elm that still survive. After his death in 1888, the garden was left untended until it was mostly just a lawn around the house.

The 572-acre property was then sold in 1896 to William Cook, who sold off several acres and the property was once again subdivided when Cook died with a Mr Beckett and a Mr Stewart buying the property which contained the house. They, in turn, sold off parts until in 1946 the house and the surrounding 9 acres was purchased by Basil Quaife. Quaife subsequently sold this property in 1952 to Herbert Ensor.

=== Miles Warren, John and Pauline Trengrove ===
Deciding in the mid-1970s that they would like to create a large garden together John and Pauline Trengrove and Pauline's brother Miles Warren began looking for a suitable site. After a number of setbacks, Miles Warren heard that Ohinetahi was for sale by its current owners Mr and Mrs Herbert Ensor, who would be remaining on an adjacent property. They subsequently bought it for $100,000, financing the purchase by selling other properties. During the period between purchase and possession, the three new owners embarked on a six-week tour of gardens in England in a search for ideas to include in their proposed garden. Among the gardens visited were Sissinghurst, Wilton House and Hidcote Manor. First they restored the large stone colonial villa. Work commenced on creating the present garden in 1977.

After about ten years John and Pauline decided to build a new house and create a garden on 10 acres of land at Ohoka. To fund their new project Warren purchased their share of the property to become Ohinetahi's sole owner.

In subsequent years two small art galleries, as well as a cottage for the housekeeper, were constructed on the property. One gallery contains works by prominent New Zealand artists including Shane Cotton, Julian Dashper, Pat Hanly, Ralph Hotere, Richard McWhannell and Peter Robinson. The other gallery contains 3D models and architectural photographs of building projects undertaken by the architectural firm of Warren & Mahoney.

The main house was badly damaged by the 4 September 2010 Christchurch earthquake The stone walls of the three storey block were badly cracked and the four gables fell. As a result, it was decided to reduce the central block of the house from three to two stories, while at the same time the house was earthquake strengthened and given a strengthened masonry ground floor and a new timber-framed first floor. While the structure of the art gallery was undamaged the Oamaru stone exterior was badly cracked and had to be rebuilt, only to then be damaged again by the February 2011 earthquake.

After Mrs Ensor died in 2008 Warren was able to purchase from her heirs a 0.76-hectare strip of land which allowed Ohinetahi to be expanded towards the harbour side. Terraces were constructed on this land using stone removed from the upper storey of the house when it was restored after the earthquake.

In recent times a number of large modern sculptures by renowned New Zealand artists have been installed in both the park and garden.

In 2012 Miles Warren gifted the homestead and gardens as well as an endowment to the Ohinetahi Charitable Trust to ensure that the property and its contents are preserved for the benefit of the public. In early February 2017 a major fire on the Ports Hills which required the evacuation of 107 local residents came within 300 to 400 metres of the house coating the property with falling ash.

In 2024, the Ōhinetahi Trust built the Pavilion, a gorgeous private event space overlooking the harbour, ideal for weddings, celebrations, and corporate events.

== Structure ==
The woodland that surrounds the home is well structured and designed with views down to the harbour. Ohinetahi uses the concept of "rooms" to create effect. The terraced garden is sectioned into groupings. Hedges shelter those plants that have difficulty in high winds. The garden is characterised by a herb potager, box-edged rose garden, and herbaceous borders. Other features of the English-inspired landscaping include a Red Garden (formerly white), ogee gazebo, pond, bridge, statues, stone and metal sculpture, and an Oamaru stonewall. The central lawn fronts the house's main façade, which has arched colonial verandas. A stream flows from the garden down to the harbour.

== Flora ==
Flora include Black Locust shade trees, a hedge of Monterey Cypress, as well as densely planted rhododendrons, camellias, and Buxus. Though Potts introduced grasses, he found the Poa to be hard to eradicate.

== Awards ==
Ohinetahi has received the Garden of Distinction and Garden of Excellence Award. The homestead is registered as a Category I heritage building with Heritage New Zealand.

== See also ==
- List of oldest buildings in Christchurch
