= 1858 Akaroa by-election =

New Zealand by-election

The Akaroa by-election 1858 was a by-election held in the Akaroa electorate during the 2nd New Zealand Parliament, on 31 May 1858. The by-election was caused by the resignation of incumbent MP John Cuff on 12 January 1878.

The election and was won unopposed by William Moorhouse, who had represented the seat in the previous parliament.
