= 1874 Akaroa by-elections =

Two New Zealand by-elections

Following the resignation of Robert Heaton Rhodes from his Akaroa seat in the New Zealand parliament, William Montgomery contested the 20 April 1874 by-election against Walter Pilliet. The results were 168 and 76 votes, respectively, i.e., a margin of 92 for Montgomery. He thus entered parliament during the 5th term.

April 1874 Akaroa by-election
Party	Candidate	Votes	%	±%
Independent	William Montgomery	168	68.85	
Independent	Walter Pilliet	76	31.15	
Turnout		244		
Majority		92	37.70	

In July 1874, a select committee declared Montgomery's election to be "null and void", as he had a contract for the supply of railway sleepers with the general government in breach of election rules. The select committee accepted that the breach was inadvertent. Montgomery stood for re-election in the second by-election, on 10 August 1874 and was returned unopposed.
