= 1863 Akaroa by-election =

New Zealand by-election

The 1863 Akaroa by-election was a by-election held on 30 October 1863 during the 3rd New Zealand Parliament in the Canterbury electorate of Akaroa.

The by-election was caused by the resignation of the incumbent MP Augustus White on 28 August 1863.

The by-election was won by Lancelot Walker.

It appears that there were no other candidates, and he was declared duly elected. There are no newspaper reports of a poll being held. Although two reports suggested that Captain R. Greaves was proposing to stand, a third said he had withdrawn.
