= Governors Bay =

Settlement in Christchurch, New Zealand

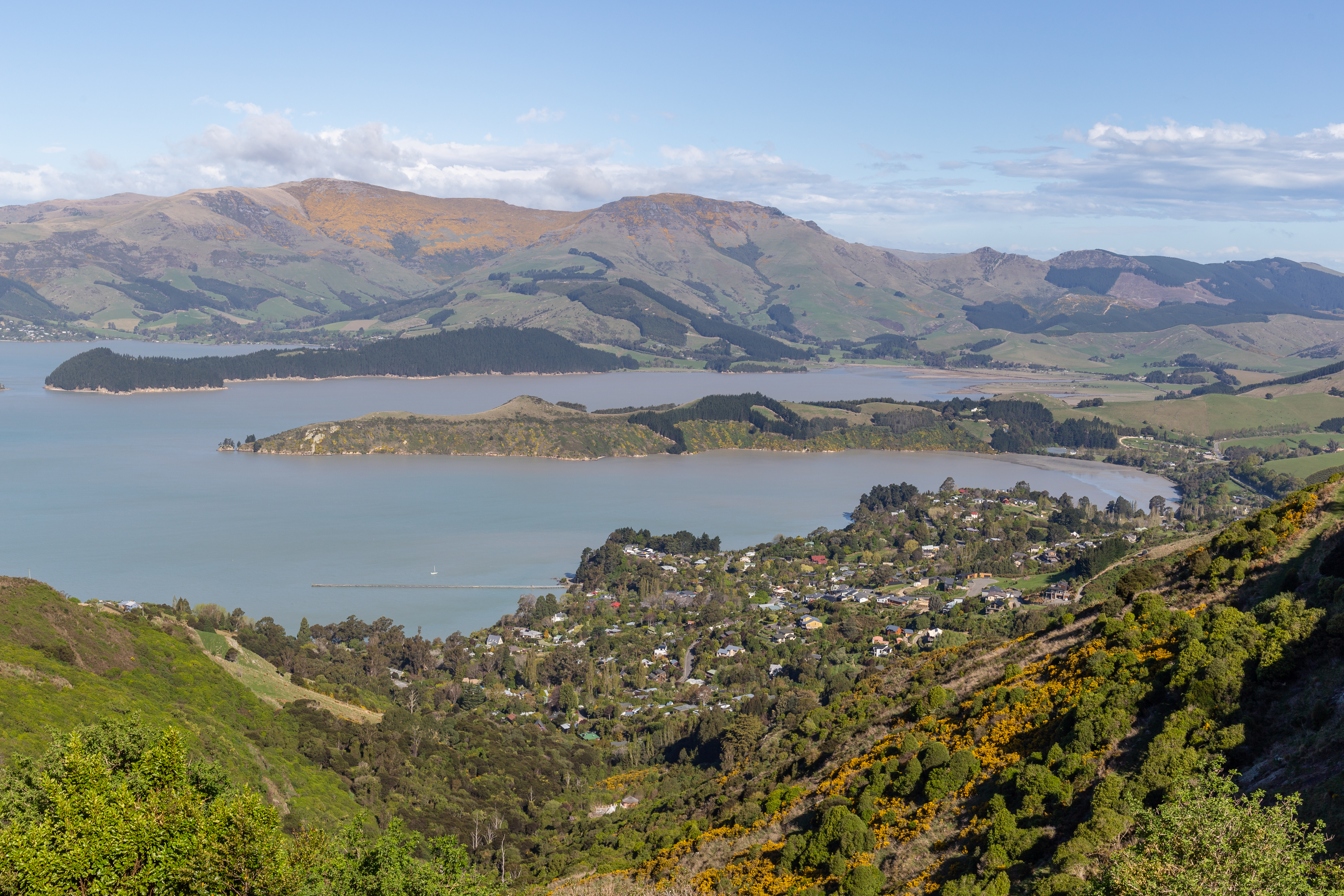
- View of Governors Bay from the Port Hills

- Rural settlement area within Christchurch City Council boundaries

- Location within South Island Location within New Zealand
- Coordinates: 43°37′29″S 172°38′54″E
- Country: New Zealand
- Region: Canterbury
- Local authority: Christchurch City Council
- Ward: Banks Peninsula
- Community: Te Pātaka o Rākaihautū Banks Peninsula
- Electorates: Banks Peninsula; Te Tai Tonga (Māori)

Government
  - Territorial Authority: Christchurch City Council
  - Regional council: Environment Canterbury
  - Mayor of Christchurch: Phil Mauger
  - Banks Peninsula MP: Tracey McLellan
  - Te Tai Tonga MP: Mananui Ramsden

Area
  - Total: 3.24 km^{2} (1.25 sq mi)

Population (June 2025)
  - Total: 900
  - Density: 280/km^{2} (720/sq mi)
- Time zone: UTC+12 (NZST)
  - Summer (DST): UTC+13 (NZDT)

Governors Bay is a small town in Canterbury, New Zealand.

== Geography ==
The settlement of Governors Bay is located on Banks Peninsula near the head of Lyttelton Harbour. It is connected via Governors Bay Road to Lyttelton, via Dyers Pass Road over the Port Hills to the Christchurch suburb of Cashmere, and via Main Road to the south side of the harbour basin and Banks Peninsula.

== Demographics ==
Governors Bay is described by Stats NZ as a rural settlement, which covers 3.24 km^{2} (1.25 sq mi). It had an estimated population of 900 as of June 2025, with a population density of 278 people per km^{2}.

Historical population
| Year | Pop. | ±% p.a. |
|---|---|---|
| 2006 | 801 | — |
| 2013 | 816 | +0.27% |
| 2018 | 864 | +1.15% |
| 2023 | 882 | +0.41% |

Governors Bay had a population of 882 in the 2023 New Zealand census, an increase of 18 people (2.1%) since the 2018 census, and an increase of 66 people (8.1%) since the 2013 census. There were 420 males, 456 females, and 3 people of other genders in 348 dwellings. 4.1% of people identified as LGBTIQ+. The median age was 50.4 years (compared with 38.1 years nationally). There were 132 people (15.0%) aged under 15 years, 111 (12.6%) aged 15 to 29, 474 (53.7%) aged 30 to 64, and 165 (18.7%) aged 65 or older.

People could identify as more than one ethnicity. The results were 96.3% European (Pākehā); 5.4% Māori; 1.0% Pasifika; 2.0% Asian; 1.7% Middle Eastern, Latin American and African New Zealanders (MELAA); and 1.7% other, which includes people giving their ethnicity as "New Zealander". English was spoken by 98.3%, Māori by 1.4%, Samoan by 0.7%, and other languages by 11.6%. No language could be spoken by 1.4% (e.g. too young to talk). New Zealand Sign Language was known by 0.7%. The percentage of people born overseas was 32.0, compared with 28.8% nationally.

Religious affiliations were 25.9% Christian, 0.3% Hindu, 1.0% New Age, 0.7% Jewish, and 1.7% other religions. People who answered that they had no religion were 65.3%, and 5.1% of people did not answer the census question.

Of those at least 15 years old, 330 (44.0%) people had a bachelor's or higher degree, 330 (44.0%) had a post-high school certificate or diploma, and 87 (11.6%) people exclusively held high school qualifications. The median income was $55,000, compared with $41,500 nationally. 162 people (21.6%) earned over $100,000 compared to 12.1% nationally. The employment status of those at least 15 was 390 (52.0%) full-time, 132 (17.6%) part-time, and 12 (1.6%) unemployed.

== Amenities ==
Te Kura o Ōhinetahi - Governors Bay School in Jetty Road caters for students from year 0 to year 8. It had a roll of 92 as of July 2026. The first school in the area was at Gebbies Flat, now called Teddington, which opened in 1864. A school opened on Governors Bay Road in 1868. The current school opened in 1963 to replace the 1868 one which did not have enough space and was not sufficiently central.

From year 9 onwards, students attend Cashmere High School.

Ōtoromiro Hotel (previously known as Governors Bay Hotel) is a 150-year-old hotel located in Governors Bay. The hotel recently dropped its connection with Sir George Grey, a controversial colonial former Governor of New Zealand.

Cholmondeley Children's Centre in Cholmondeley Lane is a children's home providing short-term or emergency residential care for children, usually between the ages of 3–12 years, and support for their families.

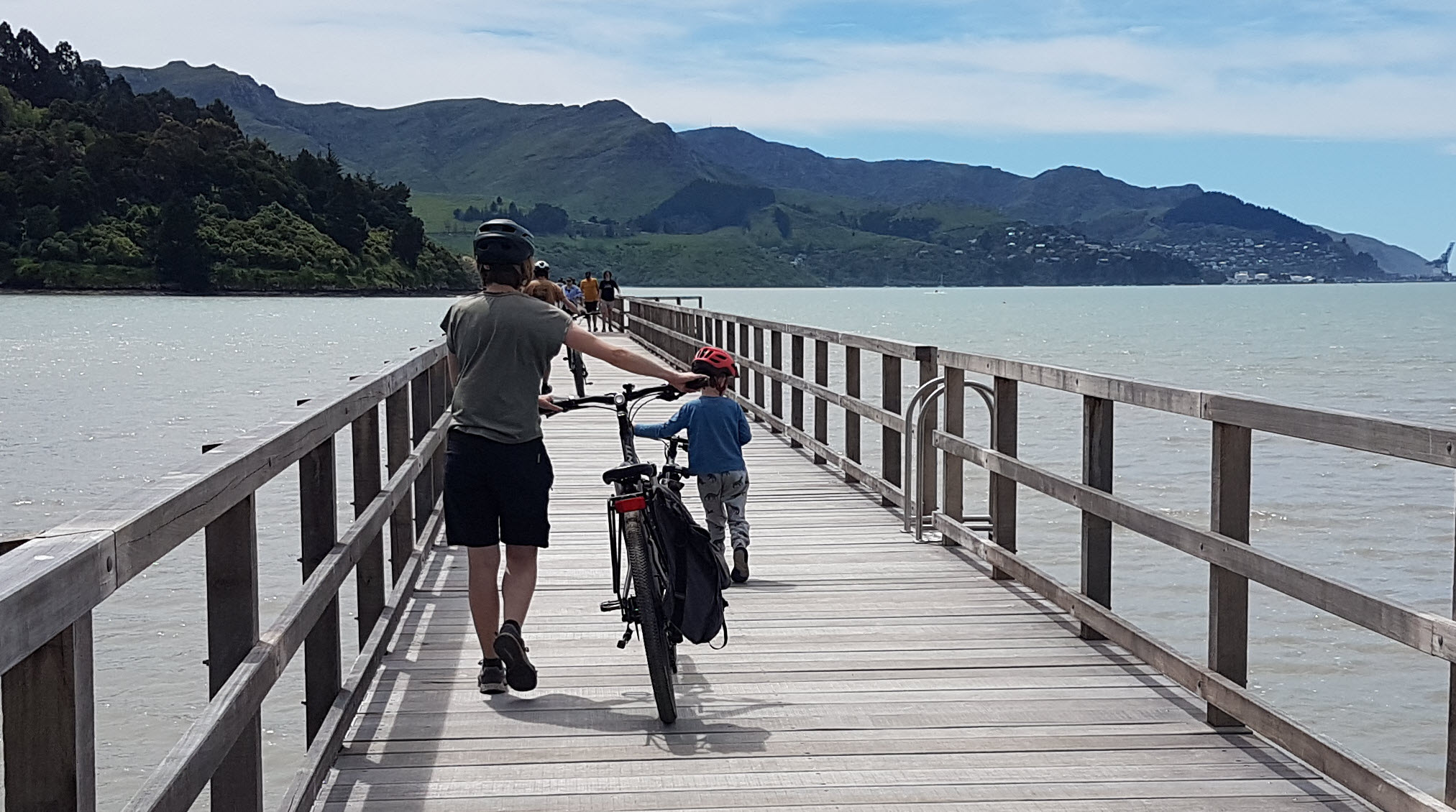
Governors Bay Jetty in November 2023

Governors Bay Jetty is a 300 m (980 ft)-long wooden jetty that juts out into the bay. It is open to the public and free to use. The jetty is generally used for walking, fishing, and jetty jumping. It provides a great view of the surrounding volcanic landscape and access to the water at tide times when it is not possible to access from the shore due to the mudflats. The original short jetty (approx. 20m long) was built in 1874 and extended to 300m in 1913. After the 2011 Christchurch earthquakes, the jetty was closed to the public and the Council did not plan to repair it. However, a group of local volunteers set up Governors Bay Jetty Restoration Trust and raised money to rebuild the jetty. The rebuild project started in October 2022 and finished in September 2023 and was managed by the trust.

== Heritage buildings ==
The Ohinetahi historic homestead, in Ohinetahi, is a Category I heritage building, and the associated formal garden is considered to be one of New Zealand's finest. A partnership of three purchased the property in 1977 and one of them, prominent Christchurch architect Sir Miles Warren, has lived in the property since soon afterwards. Damage from the September 2010 quake forced changes to lighten the upper story of the building. Sir Miles gifted the property "to the nation" in early 2013.

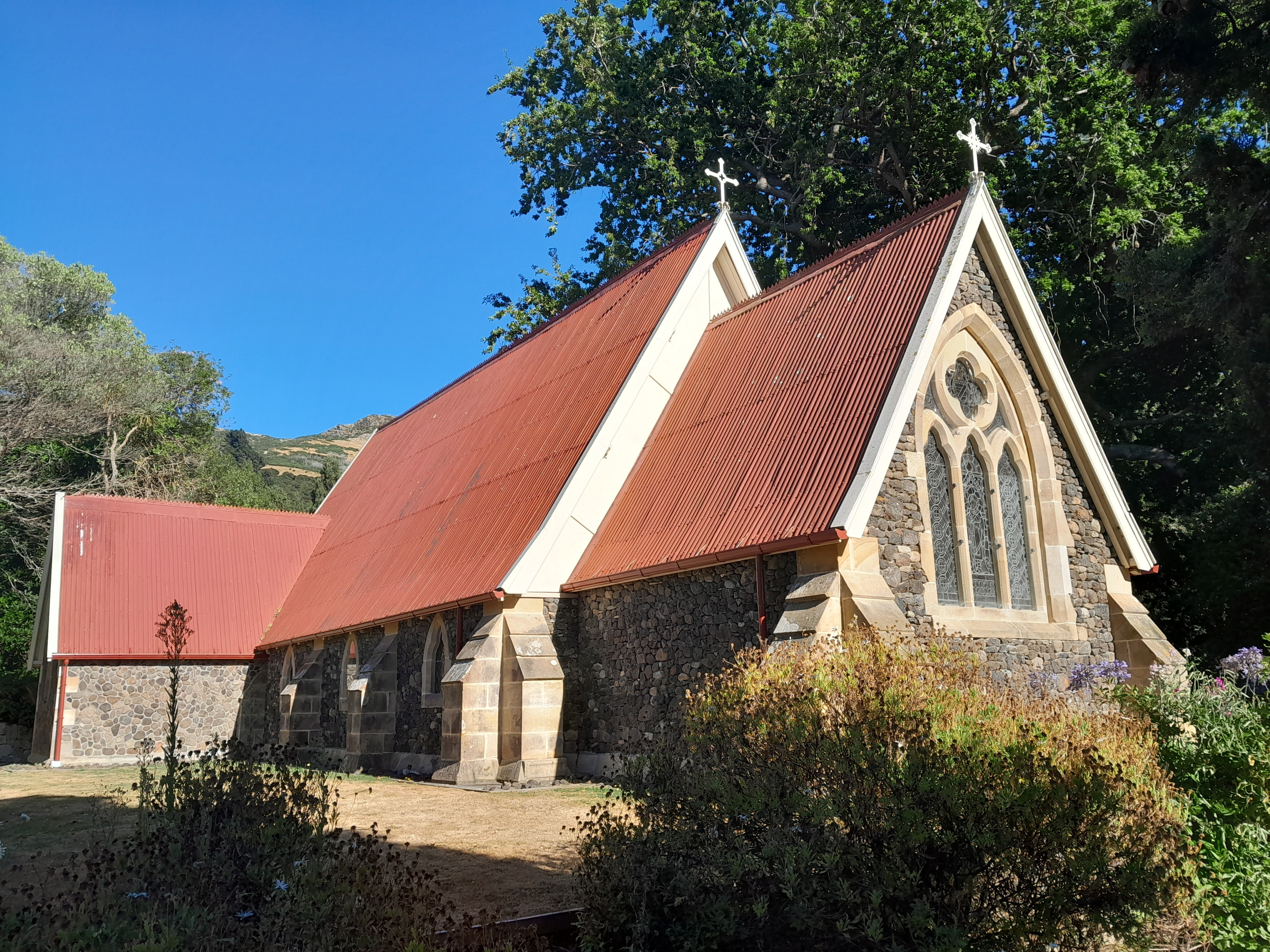
St Cuthbert's Church (2023)

St Cuthbert's Church in Governors Bay Road, built in 1860, is also a Category I building. It was significantly damaged in the September 2010 earthquake. The local community worked with the Church Property Trust to repair and restore the church and it was reopened in 2017. The church grounds contain the grave of Mary Elizabeth Small whose story is told in the children’s novel The Runaway Settlers.

The original 1868 Governors Bay School and the associated school house are both Category II heritage structures, significant because there are very few remaining school buildings from provincial government times. The school is located on land donated by Thomas Potts.

== Notable residents ==
- Leslie Kenton (1941–2016) American-born writer, journalist and entrepreneur
- Margaret Mahy (1936–2012), author of children's and young adult books
- Mary Elizabeth Small (1812–1908), market gardener and farmer, and the inspiration for Elsie Locke's 1965 children's novel The Runaway Settlers
- Mona Tracy (1892–1959), children's novelist, journalist, poet, short-story writer, and community worker
Photos from Governors Bay
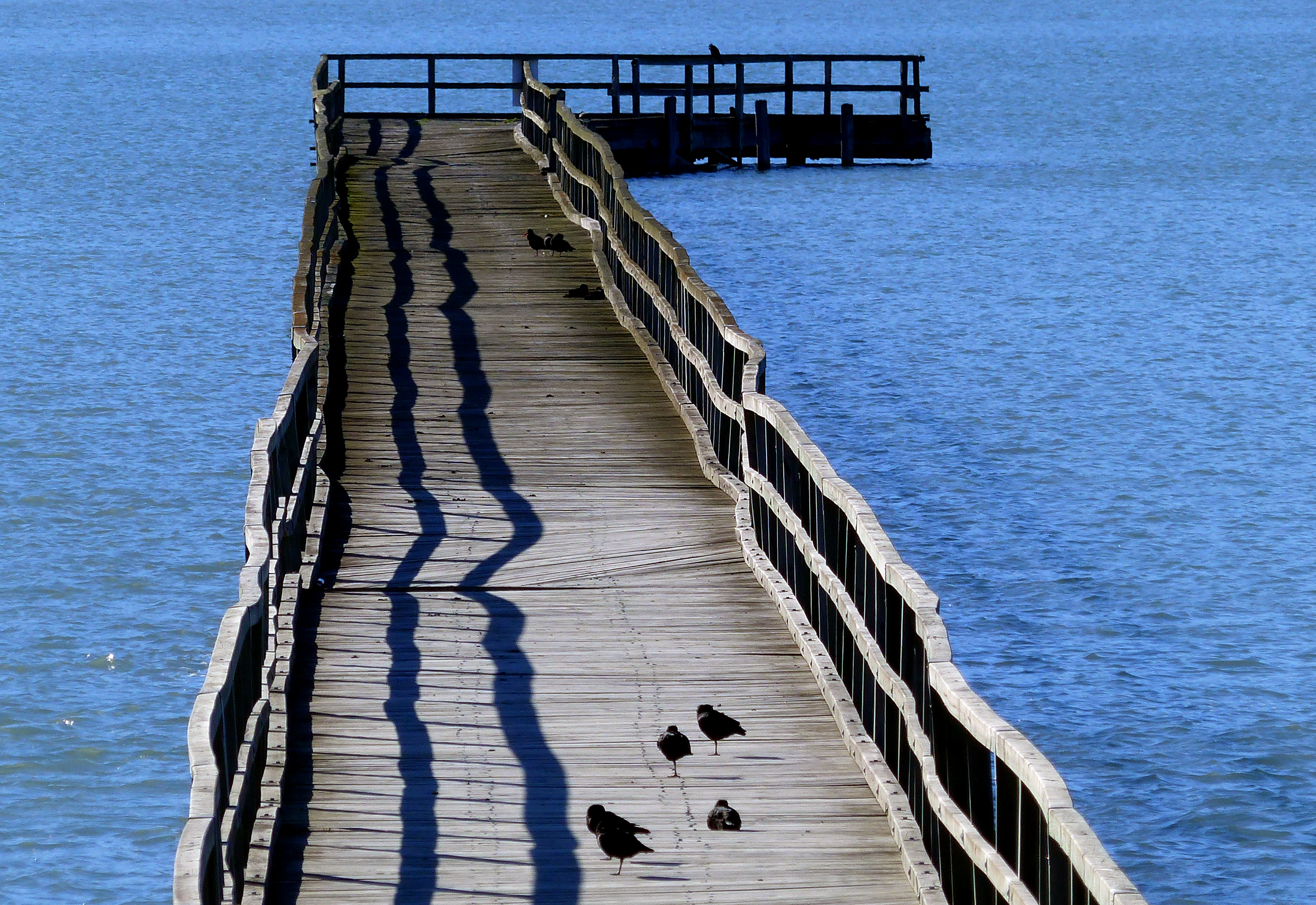
Governors Bay Jetty in 2015

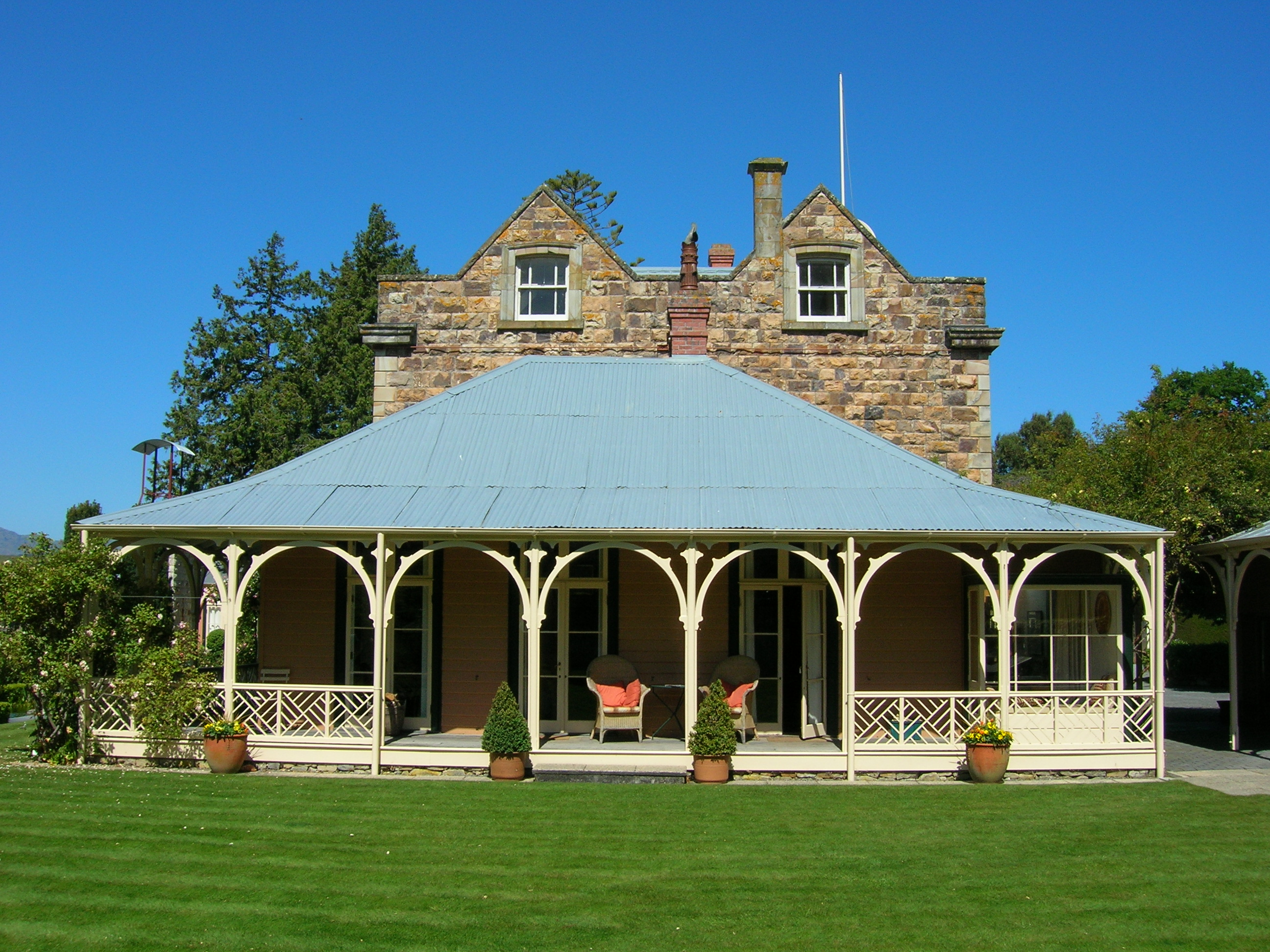
Ohinetahi Homestead in 2005

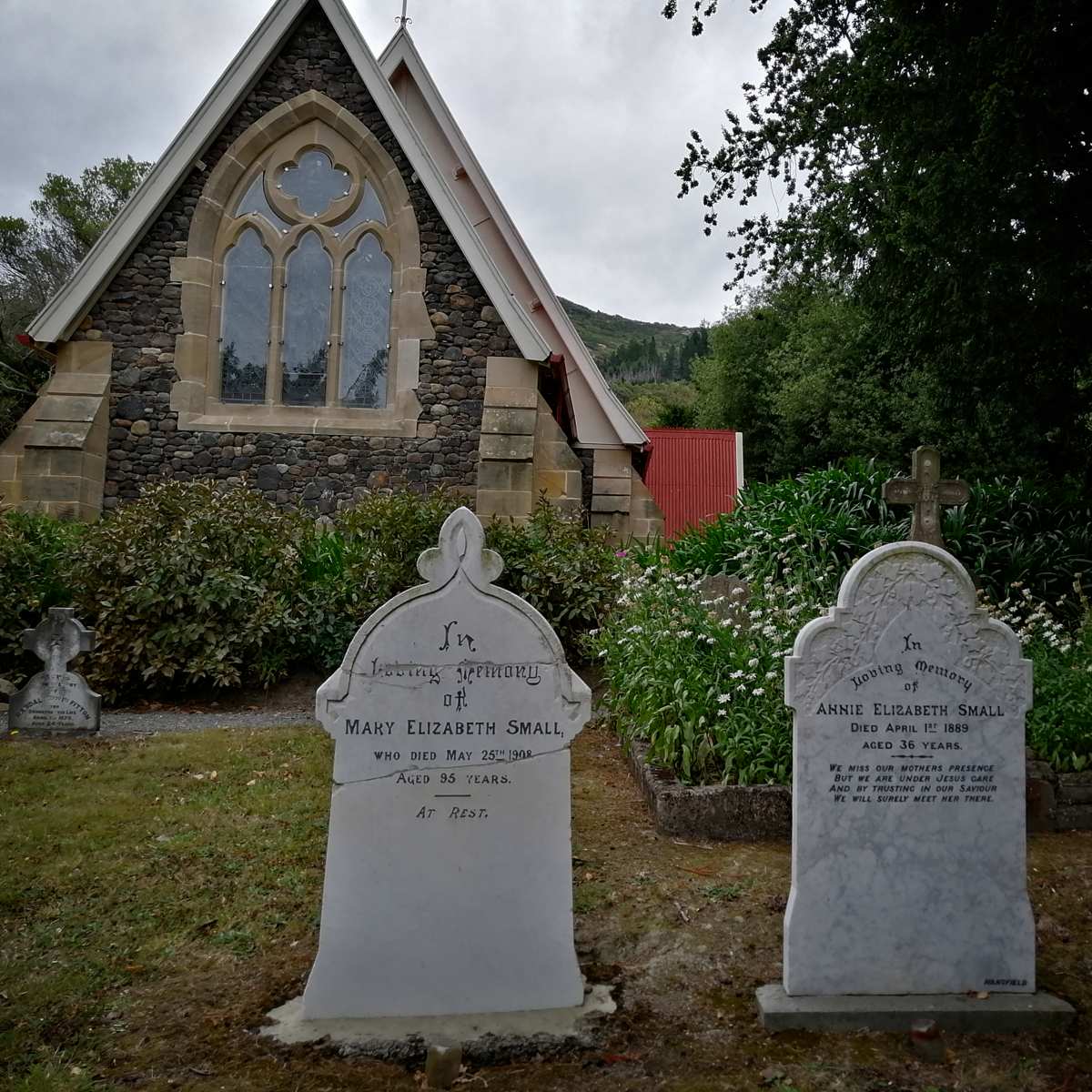
St Cuthbert's church in 2021
