= Montgomery Park Scenic Reserve =

Conservation reserve on Banks Peninsula, New Zealand

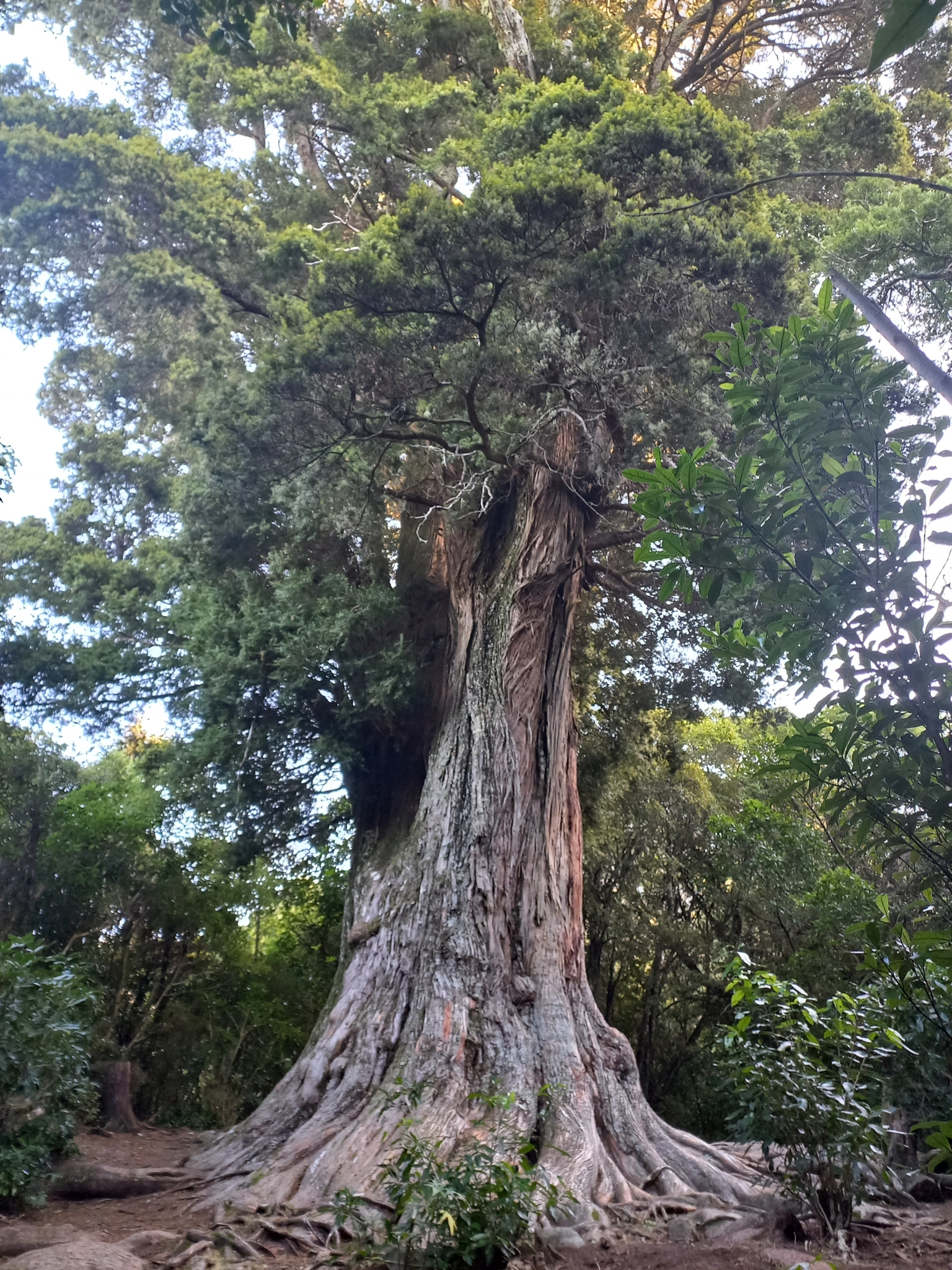
- 2000-year-old tōtara in the Reserve

- Location within Banks Peninsula
- Location: Banks Peninsula
- Nearest city: Christchurch
- Coordinates: 43°44′28″S 172°52′29″E
- Area: 16 hectares (40 acres)
- Elevation: 500 m (1,640.42 ft)
- Created: 1941
- Etymology: After William Montgomery
- Operator: Department of Conservation (New Zealand)

Montgomery Park Scenic Reserve is a public conservation reserve on Banks Peninsula south of Christchurch, New Zealand. It is located on the Summit Road near Hilltop, the saddle between Little River and Akaroa, and is notable for a large tōtara tree that is perhaps 2000 years old.

== Geography ==
Montgomery Park Scenic Reserve is located in approximately the geographical centre of Banks Peninsula, about 40 kilometres (25 mi) southeast of Christchurch. The small parking area below the reserve is at the crest of the Akaroa Highway that leads from Christchurch to Akaroa Harbour, about 500 metres (550 yd) along the Eastern Bays Summit Road from Hilltop. The reserve is 16 hectares (40 acres) in size, tucked into the southeastern face of a volcanic escarpment facing Akaroa Harbour.

A short walking track in the reserve allow access to the giant tōtara and continues uphill, leaving the forest and crossing pasture, regenerating forest, and steep boulders until after an hour it reaches an unnamed "Rocky Peak". This track is the terminus of Te Ara Pātaka, the Summit Walkway.

== History ==
The reserve is named after the politician William Montgomery (1821–1914), who represented the Akaroa electorate from 1874 to 1887 and was on the Legislative Council from 1892 to 1907. It was donated as a public park by his son, William Hugh Montgomery, a former politician and landowner in Little River. William Montgomery senior had purchased the land around 1870, and in 1940 his son gifted the 40 acres of bush reserve to the Wairewa County Council. It was handed over in a formal ceremony in front of the giant tōtara on 2 January 1941, and the County Council resolved on 14 February to name it Montgomery Park in honour of Montgomery senior (though towards the end of W.H. Montgomery's life it was commonly seen as commemorating him as well).

== Ecology ==
=== Flora ===
Montgomery Park Scenic Reserve is remnant podocarp/broadleaf forest typical of Banks Peninsula, sitting between lowland and upland zones. The main forest trees are lowland and mountain tōtara (Podocarpus totara and P. laetus), mataī (Prumnopitys taxifolia), ribbonwood (Plagianthus regius), narrow-leaved lacebark (Hoheria angustifolia), and māhoe (Melicytus ramiflorus). Fivefinger (Pseudopanax arboreus), broadleaf/kāpuka (Griselinia littoralis), tree fuchsia/kōtukutuku (Fuchsia excorticata) and lancewood (Pseudopanax crassifolius) are common.

A centrepiece of the reserve is a large lowland tōtara, 20 metres (66 ft) high and measuring 8.5 metres (28 ft) around the trunk, that is possibly 2,000 years old.

== Management ==
This bush remnant had been heavily grazed by cattle for decades, but by the time it was gifted to the County Council it was fenced off, a track was cut between the giant tōtara and the summit road, and ferns were beginning to regenerate on the forest floor. The County Council approved £125 for tree planting in the reserve as part of the centennial commemoration of the Treaty of Waitangi, and further planting took place in 1942.

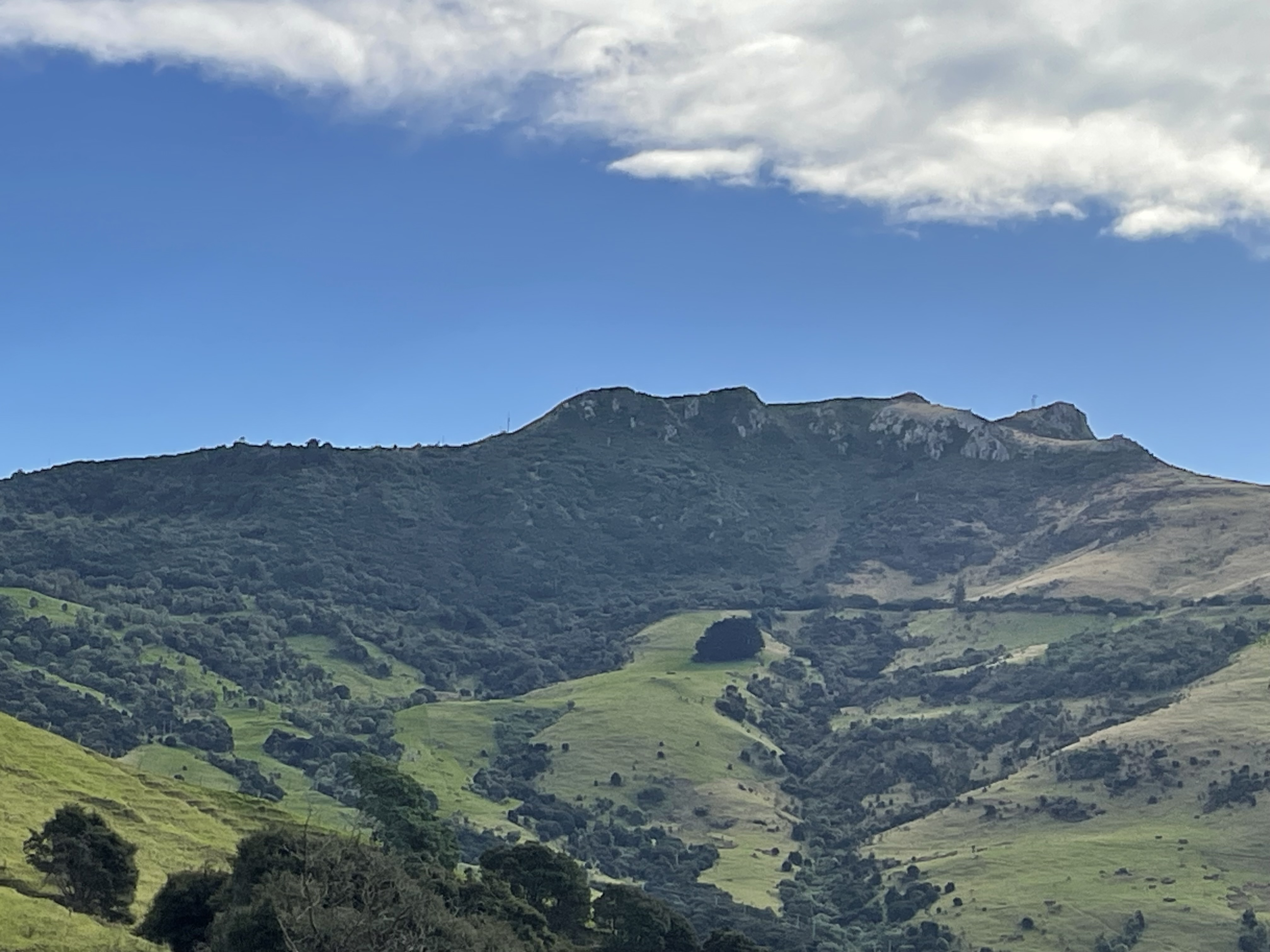
View of the reserve from State Highway 75

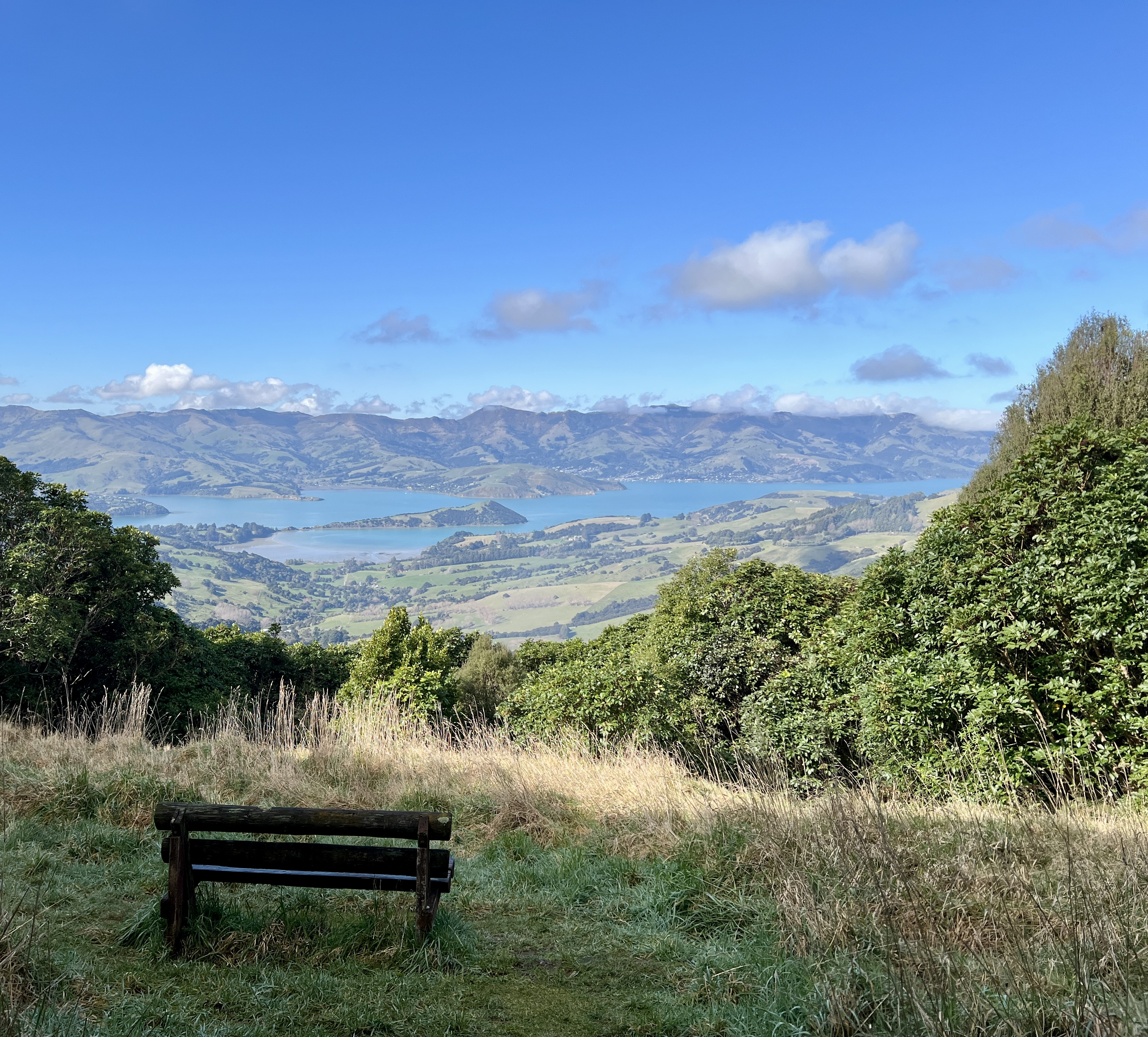
View of Akaroa Harbour from the reserve

In April 1968, 40 acres (16 ha) of land adjoining the eastern side of Montgomery Park was purchased by the Department of Lands and Survey from Little River farmer J. D. R. White for $1000. This gave access to a rocky outcrop above the reserve giving all-around views of Lake Forsyth, Akaroa Harbour, and Pigeon Bay, and the track was extended to this summit.

A youth hostel was once sited in Montgomery Park, though it no longer exists. In 1955, W. H. Montgomery donated £1000 to the Youth Hostel Association to fund the construction of the three-room building, able to host 20 people, in a clearing in the reserve. Construction had to be suspended while government permission was sought to change the classification of Montgomery Park from scenic reserve to recreation reserve, which would allow building. The hostel was completed by volunteer labour and opened in October 1957.

In 1983, pine trees that had been planted in the reserve were felled by Wairewa County Council, after 15 years of recommendations that they be removed; several had already blown down in a 1975 storm. The felling caused some damage to the forest and blocked the walking track and access to the hostel. Residents including W. H. Montgomery's daughter, Hilda Latham, complained about the destruction, but the action was supported by Lands and Survey and the Native Forests Action Council.

== See also ==
- Conservation in New Zealand
- Banks Peninsula
