= William Montgomery Jr. =

New Zealand politician (1866–1958)

New Zealand Parliament
Years	Term	Electorate	Party
1893–1896	12th	Ellesmere	Liberal
1896–1899	13th	Ellesmere	Liberal

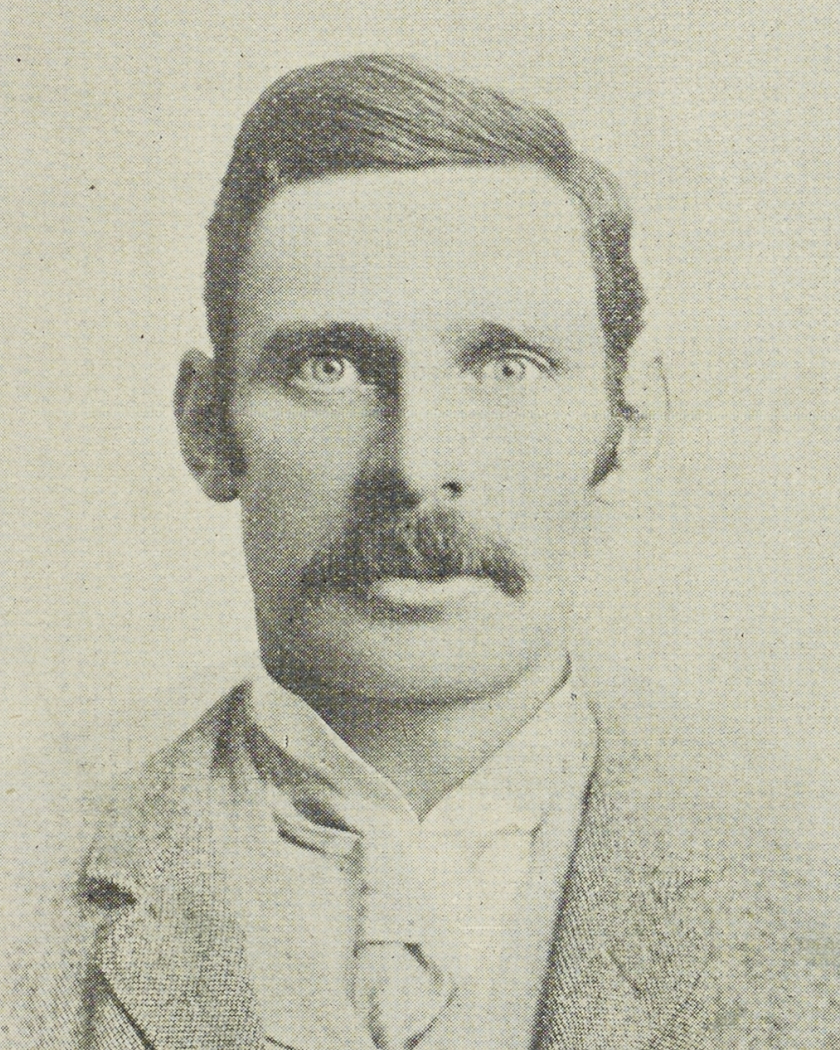
William Montgomery Jr.

William Hugh Montgomery CBE (14 September 1866 – 27 July 1958) was a New Zealand politician of the Liberal Party, from the Canterbury region.

Born in Opawa, Christchurch in 1866, he was the eldest son of William Montgomery, who had represented the Akaroa electorate. Montgomery attended primary school at French Farm, and his high school education was at Christ's College and then Christchurch Boys' High School—he was the first day pupil to enrol there, and is the first name on the school roll. He graduated with a BA from Balliol College, Oxford, in 1887, gaining first-class honours in jurispridence. He was then admitted to the bar in London, before returning to Christchurch in 1890 to practice for a short time at the firm of Garrick, Cowlishaw and Fisher, and being admitted as barrister and solicitor to the Supreme Court of New Zealand. Soon afterwards he took over managing his father's farm Wairewa in Little River, Banks Peninsula, and remained there the rest of his life.

When John Hall retired from the Ellesmere at the 1893 election, Montgomery stood as a Liberal and defeated the senior politician William Rolleston. Montgomery represented the electorate in the 12th and 13th parliaments under Prime Minister Richard Seddon, defeating Frederick Anson in 1896 and speaking extensively in support of the Liberal government's Old-age Pensions Bill that passed in 1898. He was defeated by 104 votes in 1899 by Conservative Heaton Rhodes.

Montgomery founded the Banks Peninsula Agricultural and Pastoral Association in 1909, and was president until 1913. He was appointed Metropolitan Commissioner of Boy Scouts in 1930, and founded the Little River Show. He served on the North Canterbury Hospital Board, and the Board of Governors of Canterbury College. In the 1919 King's Birthday Honours Montgomery was appointed a Commander of the Order of the British Empire for services as assistant director of the Base Records Office during World War I.

Montgomery maintained a strong interest in tree planting and the preservation of native forest. As a Wairewa County Councillor from 1910 until 1944 he supervised the planting of a memorial avenue of lime trees in Cooptown to commemorate the centenary of the signing of the Treaty of Waitangi. As chair of the Little River Domain Board he organised the extensive tree planting around Awa Iti Domain. In 1941 Montgomery gifted 40 acres of native bush, containing mature tōtara and mataī trees, to Wairewa County Council, who named it Montgomery Park; it is now Montgomery Park Scenic Reserve. Montgomery donated £1000 in 1955 to enable a youth hostel to be built in the reserve.

Montgomery married Edina Mary Allen, daughter of James Allen, in 1902 and had two daughters, Hilda and Iris. He died at his home Waiwera in 1958, aged 91 years, at that time New Zealand's oldest former Parliamentarian.

New Zealand Parliament
Preceded by John Hall	Member of Parliament for Ellesmere; 1893–1899	Succeeded by Heaton Rhodes
