= 1866 Mount Herbert by-election =

New Zealand by-election

The 1866 Mount Herbert by-election was a by-election held on 27 July in the Mount Herbert electorate in Canterbury during the 4th New Zealand Parliament.

The by-election was caused by William Sefton Moorhouse who was elected for two electorates in the 1866 election, and chose to represent Westland.

He was replaced by Thomas Potts.

Potts was the only nomination, so was declared elected unopposed.
