= John Joyce (New Zealand politician) =

New Zealand politician

Member of the New Zealand Parliament for Lyttelton
- In office 1887–1890
- In office 1893–1899

Member of the New Zealand Parliament for Akaroa
- In office 1890–1893
- Preceded by: Alexander McGregor
- Succeeded by: electorate abolished

Personal details
- Born: 1839 Penzance, Cornwall, England
- Died: 1 December 1899 (aged 60) Lyttelton, New Zealand
- Party: Independent, then Liberal Party
- Children: four sons and six daughters

John Joyce (1839 – 1 December 1899) was a Member of Parliament for Lyttelton and Akaroa in the South Island of New Zealand.

== Early life ==
Joyce was born in Penzance, Cornwall in 1839. As a boy, he worked in the deep sea fishing industry. He was made the master of a schooner at age 19. In 1854, he emigrated to Victoria and worked for the Water Police in Williamstown, Melbourne. He emigrated to New Zealand in 1861, to work for the Water Police in Port Chalmers. He was appointed clerk in the magistrates' court, before joining the legal firm of Howorth and Hodgkins in Dunedin. Joyce was admitted a barrister and solicitor of the Supreme Court in 1873. He found a partner in Mr. J. A. D. Adams, and they set up the firm of Joyce and Adams.

He moved to Canterbury and started his own legal practice in 1879, with offices in Lyttelton and Sydenham. He was elected onto the Sydenham Borough Council and was the third mayor for the borough. Joyce moved to Lyttelton and was elected onto the Lyttelton Borough Council in 1885.

== Member of Parliament ==
New Zealand Parliament
Years	Term	Electorate	Party
1887–1890	10th	Lyttelton	Independent
1890–1893	11th	Akaroa	Liberal
1893–1896	12th	Lyttelton	Liberal
1896–1899	13th	Lyttelton	Liberal

John Joyce represented Lyttelton (1887–1890; 1893–1899) and Akaroa (1890–93) in the New Zealand House of Representatives. He was a "staunch supporter of the Liberal Party".

== Death and commemoration ==
Joyce died suddenly on 1 December 1899. He was in the midst of the 1899 general election campaign when he started to have heart problems. He saw a doctor in the morning, was prescribed rest, and died in the early evening during his sleep.

His funeral was described as one of the largest ever in the colony, and was attended by several thousand people. Due to his previous involvement with the Canterbury volunteer forces, he was given a full military funeral. The railways estimated that they transported 400 soldiers and about 2500 others to Lyttelton to the funeral.

Joyce was married in 1864 to a daughter of Mr. G. Coates (a jeweller from Christchurch), and he was survived by his wife, four sons and six daughters. Joyce Street in Lyttelton is named after him.

New Zealand Parliament
Preceded by Harry Allwright	Member of Parliament for Lyttelton; 1887–1890; 1893–1899	In abeyance Title next held by himself
In abeyance Title last held by himself	Member of Parliament for Lyttelton; 1887–1890; 1893–1899	Succeeded by George Laurenson
Preceded by Alexander McGregor	Member of Parliament for Akaroa; 1890–1893	Constituency abolished
Political offices
Preceded by Frederick Waymouth	Chairman of the Lyttelton Harbour Board; 1895–1896	Succeeded by Edward George Wright
