= 1870 City of Christchurch by-election =

New Zealand by-election

The 1870 City of Christchurch by-election was a by-election held on 12 August 1870 during the 4th New Zealand Parliament in the Christchurch electorate of Christchurch.

The by-election was caused by the resignation of the incumbent MP William Travers.

The by-election was won by William Sefton Moorhouse.

On the appointed day William Sefton Moorhouse was nominated, and as there were no other nominations he was declared elected. He then made a speech which one report said contained "nothing of importance".
