= Robert Heaton Rhodes =

New Zealand politician, (1815–1884)

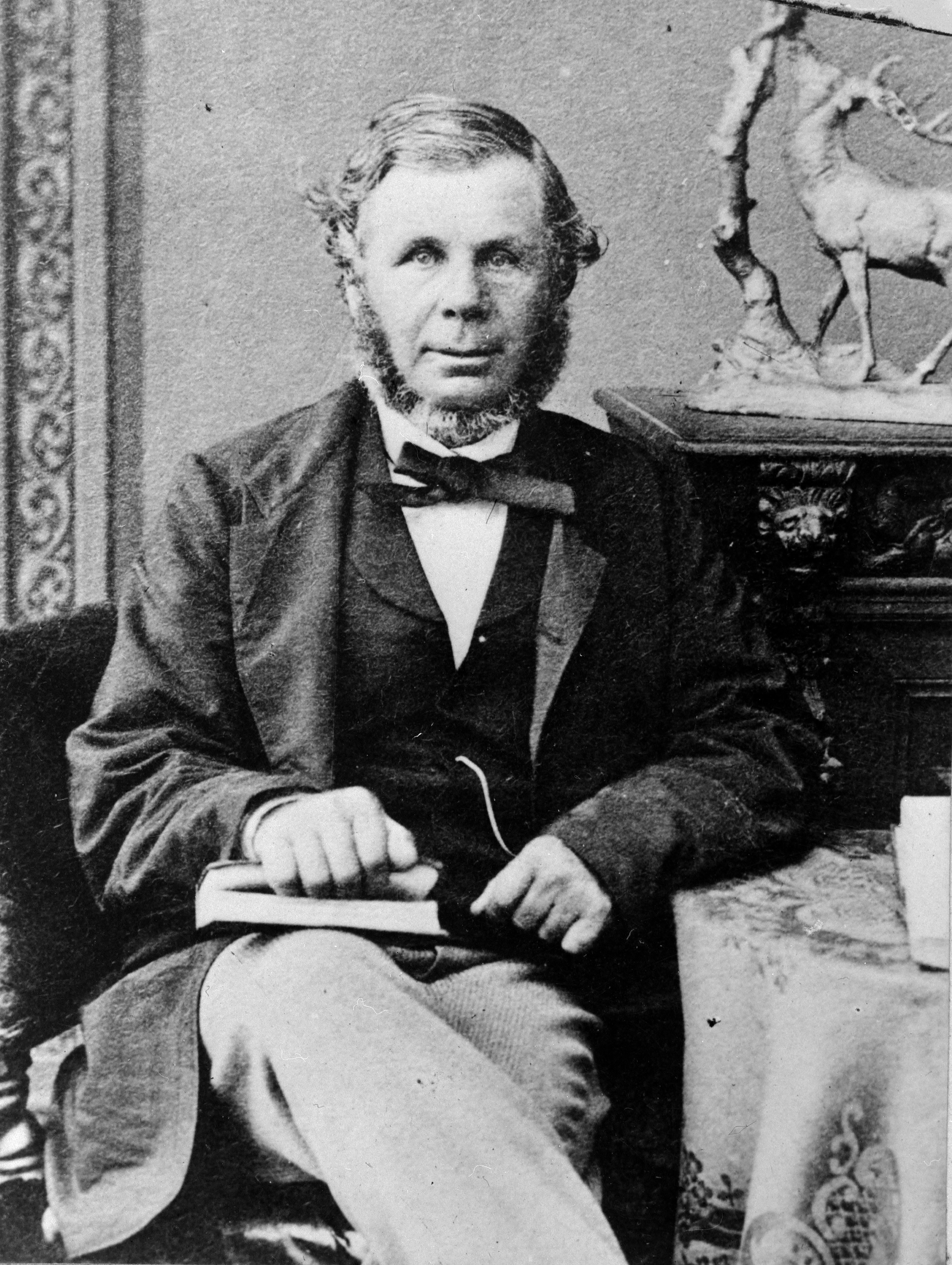
- Robert Heaton Rhodes in the 1860s

Member of the New Zealand Parliament for Akaroa
- In office 26 January 1871 – 18 February 1874

Canterbury Provincial Council
- In office 31 Aug 1853 – 12 Dec 1862
- In office 13 Jun 1866 – 28 February 1874

Personal details
- Born: 1815 Rotherham, Yorkshire, England
- Died: 1 June 1884 (aged 68 or 69) his residence Elmwood
- Relations: William Barnard Rhodes (brother); George Rhodes (brother)
- Children: Heaton Rhodes

Robert Heaton Rhodes (1815 – 1 June 1884) was a New Zealand politician who represented the Akaroa electorate from 1871 to 1874, when he resigned. He was elected unopposed in 1871.

== Biography ==
New Zealand Parliament
Years	Term	Electorate	Party
1871–1874	5th	Akaroa	Independent

Born in 1815 in Rotherham, in the English county of Yorkshire, he followed his brothers, including William Barnard Rhodes, to New Zealand in 1850, having worked in Australia. He lived at Purau and managed properties on Banks Peninsula belonging to the Rhodes brothers. He built a large house in Christchurch, Elmwood, where he died. He founded several early business enterprises, including the New Zealand Shipping Company and the Kaiapoi Woollen Manufacturing Company.

On 24 August 1853, Rhodes stood in the Akaroa electorate for a position in the House of Representatives but was beaten by William Sefton Moorhouse. On 31 August 1853, Rhodes stood in the Akaroa electorate for one of two positions on the Canterbury Provincial Council. Rhodes won the election, but there was a draw for second place, and the returning officer gave his casting vote to Rev. William Aylmer, meaning that Moorhouse was not elected. A short time later, Moorhouse stood in the same electorate for the House of Representatives and was successful.

His eldest son, Sir Heaton Rhodes (1861–1956), had a long parliamentary career.

New Zealand Parliament
Preceded by George Armstrong	Member of Parliament for Akaroa; 1871–1874	Succeeded by William Montgomery
