= Lancelot Walker =

New Zealand politician (1829–1907)

New Zealand Parliament
Years	Term	Electorate	Party
1863–1866	3rd	Akaroa	Independent
1866–1867	4th	Ashley	Independent

Lancelot Walker (26 November 1829 – 19 May 1907) was a 19th-century Member of Parliament in New Zealand.

Walker was born in 1829 to Thomas and Constantia Anne Walker of Co York, England. He served in the British Army in India, although in which regiment or unit is unclear.

Walker came to New Zealand in 1856. He lived at Four Peaks, Geraldine, Canterbury, where he died.

Walker represented the Akaroa electorate from the 1863 by-election after the resignation of Augustus White to 1866, when he was defeated by George Armstrong by just four votes at the 1866 election held on 21 February. A few days later on 2 March, he won election in the Ashley electorate, which he represented until he resigned in 1867. On 15 May 1885, he was appointed to the New Zealand Legislative Council, where he served until his death on 19 May 1907.

New Zealand Parliament
Preceded by Augustus White	Member of Parliament for Akaroa; 1863–1866	Succeeded by George Armstrong
New constituency	Member of Parliament for Ashley; 1866–1867	Succeeded by Henry Tancred
