= George Armstrong (New Zealand politician) =

New Zealand politician

George Armstrong (1822 – 1 September 1905) was a 19th-century Member of Parliament in Canterbury, New Zealand.

== Biography ==
New Zealand Parliament
Years	Term	Electorate	Party
1866–1870	4th	Akaroa	Independent

He was born in St John's, Nova Scotia and first visited Banks Peninsula in command of a trading brig in the 1840s. He was in charge of the schooner Edwin Stanley during the New Zealand Wars, and was court-martialled for taking his vessel to the rescue of a settler attacked by Māori while carrying stores for troops at Wanganui. He settled in Akaroa on Banks Peninsula.

He represented the Akaroa electorate on the Canterbury Provincial Council from 1861 to 1862, and the Wainui electorate from 1862 to 1863.

He represented the Akaroa electorate in Parliament from 1866, when he beat the incumbent (Lancelot Walker), to 1870 when he retired. He stood for Parliament again in the 1887 election. Of the six candidates, he came third.

His son George Armstrong (1853–1932) was on the Akaroa Borough Council for 50 years from 1879, including nearly 30 years as mayor.

New Zealand Parliament
Preceded by Lancelot Walker	Member of Parliament for Akaroa; 1866–1870	Succeeded by Robert Heaton Rhodes
