= Mary Elizabeth Small =

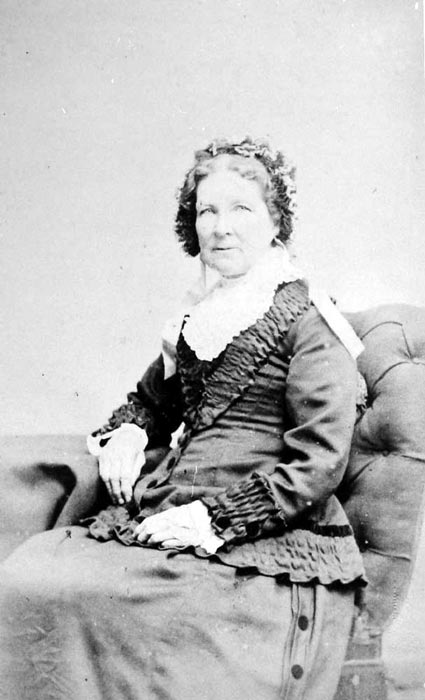
- Born: Mary Elizabeth Philpott c. 1812; Hawkhurst, Kent, England
- Died: 2 May 1908 (aged 95–96)
- Resting place: St Cuthberts Church, Governors Bay, Canterbury, New Zealand
- Other names: Mary Elizabeth Phipps
- Occupation(s): Market gardener, farmer
- Spouse: Stephen Small (m. 1841)
- Children: 6

Mary Elizabeth Small (c. 1812–1908) was a New Zealand market gardener and farmer.

== Biography ==
Small (née Philpott) was born in Hawkhurst, Kent, England around 1812. She married Stephen Small in 1841. Stephen and Mary emigrated with their children Mary Anne (16), William (5) and John (2) to Sydney, Australia on the Midlothian arriving on 8 April 1849. Three further children were born to the couple in Australia. In 1859, Mary Small took five of the six children (William, John, Archibald, James and Emma) first to Sydney and then to New Zealand. Stephen Small posted a reward for information on their whereabouts. Mary, having changed her surname to Phipps, began market gardening in Governors Bay, Canterbury. She was successful in her businesses and eventually purchased land and buildings in the area. Later in life she changed her surname back to Small. She died on 25 May 1908 and is buried at St Cuthberts Church, Governors Bay.

New Zealand author Elsie Locke based her popular children's novel, The Runaway Settlers, on Small's life.
