= William Montgomery (New Zealand politician) =

New Zealand politician

The Honourable William Montgomery
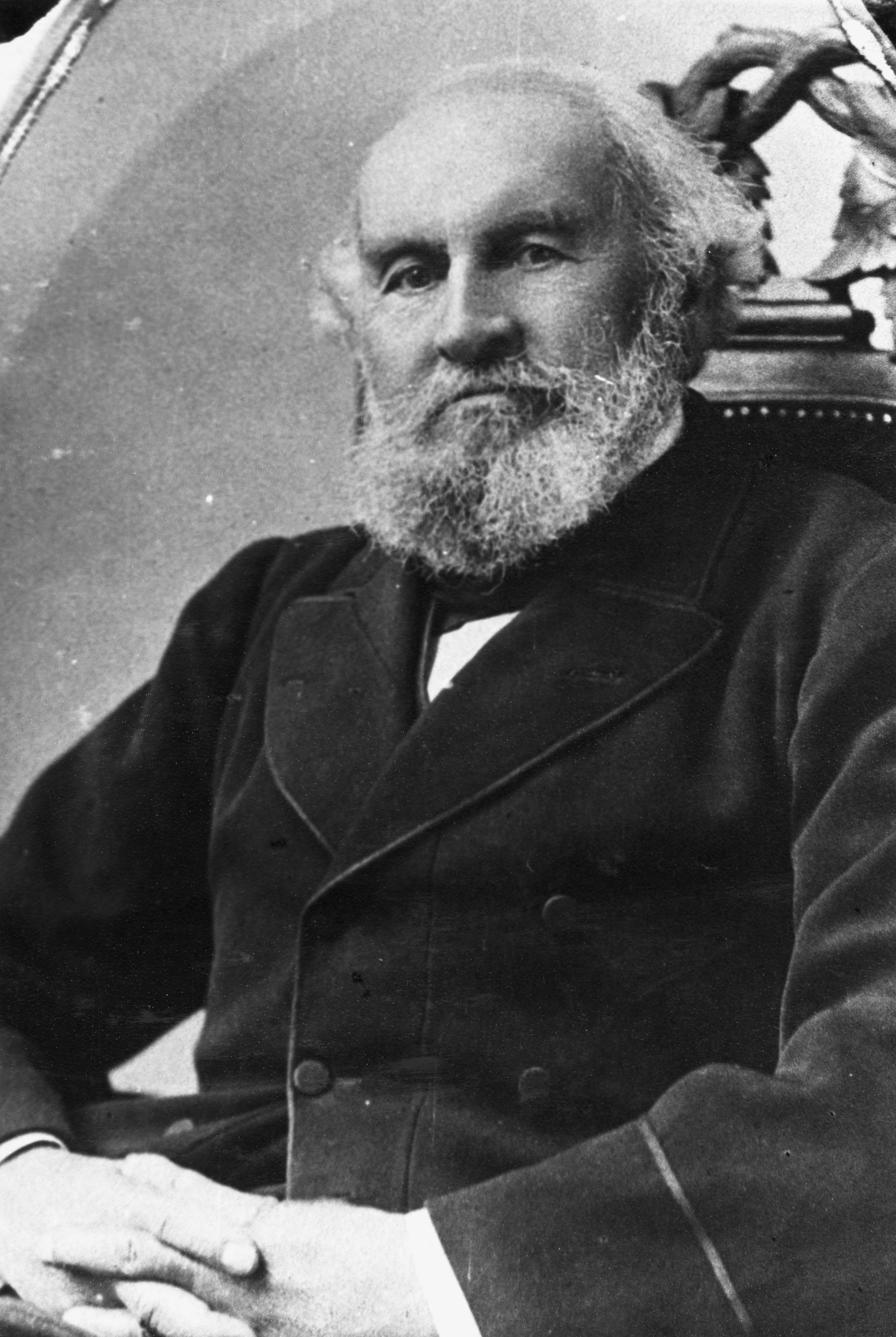
- William Montgomery in c. 1876

New Zealand Legislative Council
- In office 1892–1907

4th Minister of Education (New Zealand)
- In office 16 August 1884 – 28 August 1884
- Preceded by: Thomas Dick
- Succeeded by: Robert Stout

Member of the New Zealand Parliament for Akaroa
- In office 1874–1887
- Preceded by: Robert Rhodes
- Succeeded by: Alexander McGregor

Canterbury Provincial Council
- In office 1865–1870
- In office 1873–187?
- Preceded by: Andrew Duncan

Personal details
- Born: William John Alexander Montgomery; 1820 or 1821 London, England
- Died: 21 December 1914 (aged 93) Little River, New Zealand
- Resting place: Barbadoes Street Cemetery
- Spouse: Jane Montgomery (née Todhunter)
- Children: survived by two sons several other children died young
- Occupation: timber merchant, politician

William John Alexander Montgomery (c. 1821 – 21 December 1914) was a New Zealand politician and merchant from Little River on Banks Peninsula. Born in London, he lived in a number of places and pursued a number of occupations before settling in Christchurch, New Zealand.

== Private life ==
=== Early life ===
Montgomery was from an old Scottish family that had settled in Ireland. He was born in London and baptised on 14 January 1821. His father was Josias Montgomery, a saddler, and his mother was Eleanor Martin. His father was killed in a hunting accident in 1825, and William was educated in Belfast at the Royal Belfast Academical Institution, where his uncle Henry Montgomery was head of English.

Montgomery started going to sea when he was 13. At age 18, he was made a captain, having taken control of a ship with a drunken captain and a first mate who was unable to navigate. He later bought this ship.

=== Australia ===
Montgomery sailed to Williamstown, Victoria, these days a suburb of Melbourne, Australia, in 1850 or 1851, and joined the gold rush. After a short period of digging, he set himself up as a merchant and earned enough money to be able to buy a sheep station on the Darling Downs. Several years of drought crippled him financially, though, and he decided to emigrate to New Zealand.

=== New Zealand ===
He came to New Zealand in 1860 and settled in Canterbury. He bought the wharf in Heathcote and imported timber from the bays on Banks Peninsula for the Christchurch market. This developed into a company as a timber merchant.

On 29 August 1865, he married Jane Todhunter, born in Shenley in Hertfordshire, England. She was a daughter of John Todhunter from London. Montgomery was one of the men from a Victorian era who did not marry until they were in their middle-age, and the eventual bride would be many years their junior.

The Canterbury Club was founded in 1872 to provide an alternative to those businessmen who had less of a rural background, as was common with Christchurch Club members. Montgomery chaired the initial meeting. Both the Canterbury and Christchurch clubs still exist.

Montgomery served as acting honorary consul for the United Kingdoms of Sweden and Norway in Christchurch from 22 January 1872, and as honorary consul from 12 March 1875 to 6 August 1881.

== Political career ==
=== Local politics ===
Montgomery was elected onto the first Heathcote Road Board in 1864. In 1865, he was elected onto the Canterbury Provincial Council for the Heathcote constituency. He held this seat until 1870. In 1873, he again contested the Heathcote seat on the Provincial Council, to fill the vacancy left by Andrew Duncan. He was elected without opposition. During his time on the Provincial Council, he was on the executive in 1866, was provincial treasurer in 1868, deputy superintendent for a brief period in 1868 and leader of the Executive Council in 1874–75.

=== Member of the House of Representatives ===
New Zealand Parliament
Years	Term	Electorate	Party
1874 (1st)	5th	Akaroa	Independent
1874 (2nd)–1875	5th	Akaroa	Independent
1875–1879	6th	Akaroa	Independent
1879–1881	7th	Akaroa	Independent
1881–1884	8th	Akaroa	Independent
1884–1887	9th	Akaroa	Independent

Following the resignation of Robert Heaton Rhodes from his Akaroa seat in the New Zealand Parliament, Montgomery contested the 20 April 1874 by-election against Walter Pilliet. The results were 168 and 76 votes, respectively, i.e., a margin of 92 for Montgomery. He thus entered parliament during the 5th term.

In July 1874, a select committee declared Montgomery's election to be "null and void", as he had a contract for the supply of railway sleepers with the general government in breach of election rules. The select committee accepted that the breach was inadvertent. Montgomery stood for re-election in the 10 August 1874 by-election and was returned unopposed.

Montgomery opened the Little River railway in 1884 and worked on the extension to Akaroa, which did not proceed. He represented Akaroa until the end of the 9th parliament. He announced on 1 July 1887 that he would not stand for re-election because of ill health. Six candidates stood for the 1887 general election in Akaroa; former Akaroa mayor Alexander McGregor won by a large margin.

Ministerial appointments

During the first Stout-Vogel ministry, in August 1884, he was colonial secretary and the 4th Minister of Education. The Stout-Vogel ministry lasted for two weeks from 16 to 28 August 1884. He unselfishly stood aside when Stout needed to give ministries to Auckland members to continue in power.

Young New Zealand Party

Montgomery was recognised as the leader of the Young New Zealand Party, a reformist and left-leaning faction in Parliament which was supported by small businessmen, small farmers, and the Labour movement (particularly miners), and which grew into the Liberal Party.

=== Member of the Legislative Council ===
On 15 October 1892, he was appointed to the Legislative Council, then the upper house of New Zealand. At the time, appointments were for a seven-year period. He was reappointed on 16 October 1899. Upon the expiry of his second term on 15 October 1906, the Cabinet decided to recommend to the Governor that Montgomery be appointed for another term. But Montgomery decided to retire, and was granted permission to retain his title 'the Honourable'. 'The Honourable' became his nickname among his friends.

== Death and commemoration ==
Montgomery's wife Jane died young aged 43, several decades before him on 27 July 1879. Montgomery died at his residence in Little River on 21 December 1914. He was survived by two sons, William Hugh (1866–1958) and John (1874–1946). His son William Montgomery Jr. represented Ellesmere in 1893–99. The couple are buried at the Barbadoes Street Cemetery in the central city of Christchurch, together with those of their children who died young.

Montgomery Street in Cheviot is named for William Montgomery. Montgomery Park Scenic Reserve above the Summit Road near Hilltop is a native bush reserve that William Hugh Montgomery donated to the Wairewa County Council in 1941. The gift was to commemorate both William Hugh and his father. It contains a tōtara estimated to be 2000 years old, with a girth of 8.5 m.

Montgomery Spur is located in the Port Hills between Rapaki Track and the Avoca Valley. It was named after John Montgomery. Part of the spur is Montgomery Spur Reserve, held by Christchurch City Council as a Scenic Reserve under the Reserves Act 1977.

Political offices
Preceded by Thomas Dick	Minister of Education; 1884	Succeeded by Robert Stout
New Zealand Parliament
Preceded by Robert Heaton Rhodes	Member of Parliament for Akaroa; 1874–1887	Succeeded by Alexander McGregor
Academic offices
Preceded by Henry Barnes Gresson	Chairman of the Board of Governors of Canterbury College; 1875–1885	Succeeded by Frederick de Carteret Malet
