= Leslie Kenton =

American journalist and new age writer

- Born: June 24, 1941; Los Angeles, California
- Died: November 13, 2016 (aged 75); Governors Bay, New Zealand
- Occupations: Journalist, new age writer
- Children: 4

Leslie Kenton (June 24, 1941 – November 13, 2016) was an American-born writer, journalist and entrepreneur who specialised in New Age health and beauty. She was the daughter of jazz orchestra leader Stan Kenton.

== Early life and paternal relations ==
Kenton was born in Los Angeles to Stan and Violet Kenton (née Peters), the only child from the musician's first marriage. Her father's career was in its early stages when she was born and he was constantly on the road. Kenton's early childhood was spent with her maternal grandmother, a strict taskmaster who reputedly had her granddaughter toilet trained by the time she was six months old and struck her if she did not sit straight. "I learned that the appropriate relationship to my body was to punish it", Leslie Kenton later wrote. Reunited with her parents at 3 1/2, she lived with them in the Hollywood Hills. Unacquainted with other children, she was often with her father's band and spent time with Nat King Cole and Ronald Reagan.

Kenton later wrote in her book Love Affair (2010) that an incestuous affair with her father began with her rape at his hands in 1952 when she was 11 and he was drunk. She said the relationship became consensual, and continued for two or three years. At the time, she was spending school term time with her mother, who had remarried, and school vacations with her father. After a suicide attempt at 13, she was sent to a sanatorium. By the time her memoir was published, Kenton saw her father as a victim himself because of his own severe maternal mistreatment. In her account of her relationship with her father, she relates that she challenged him about her experience in 1972, seven years before he died, when he was in London to record for the BBC: "He was a big man and he physically crumpled". He told her: "All I can say is that I'm so sorry. At that part of my life, I didn't know what was going on".

== Relationships and children ==
Leslie Kenton was a philosophy undergraduate at Stanford University, when she became pregnant at 18. Advised by her father to have the baby adopted or marry, she did the latter, giving birth to her eldest son Branton, now a businessman; her marriage to his father Peter Dau, then a medical student, ended after three years. She worked as a model in New York City at this time.

Other than Branton, Kenton had three other children, each from later relationships with three men. Susannah was conceived after a one-night stand with an old boyfriend, Barry Comden, who later married Doris Day, leading to an estrangement from her father which lasted for some years. "Actually, the fathers of my children have not necessarily been the most important men in my life", she commented in 2007.

== Career ==
Kenton spent much of her life in the United Kingdom, moving to London after a short period living in Paris. She began a career in journalism during the late 1960s, writing initially for The Economist and as a freelance for International Management magazine. "I wrote about the heavy lifting gear industry, the aluminium industry, the airline industry", she once commented. She was appointed as health and beauty editor of Harpers & Queen in 1973, a post in which she remained until 1987.

Over several decades, Kenton wrote more than forty books. Her first was The Joy of Beauty (1976) which is reputed to have established the genre. Raw Energy (co-authored with daughter Susannah, 1984), advocates detoxification with raw vegetables, drinking of mineral water and avoiding processed foods. The book promoted a 75% raw food diet. In 1995, Kenton was described as a "high priestess of New Age health and beauty: champion of every fad from chanting to ivy juice".

Others include The X-Factor Diet (2002), which claims an affinity with the work of palaeoanthropologists, and advocates a return to the diets of our distant ancestors, and Age Power. In Journey to Freedom: 13 Quantum Leaps for the Soul (1999), she wrote about shamanism, which claims to be a means of communicating with the natural and spirit world. She wrote: "Sit or stand in front of the plant or tree and thank it for bringing its life into your circle of awareness. Now in your imagination honour the spirit of the plant and open your awareness to it".

Kenton is credited with establishing the Origins cosmetics line for Estée Lauder. She was the first chair of the British Natural Medicine Society. With Aaron, her youngest son, she began Cura Romana in 2008, which claims to be a natural method for weight loss.

== Death ==
Kenton moved to Governors Bay, Christchurch, New Zealand in 1998. She died while asleep at her home there on November 13, 2016.

== Selected publications ==
- Raw Energy (1984, with Susannah Kenton)
- Ageless Ageing (1985)
- The Ten Day Pure Body Plan (1987)
- 10 Day Clean-up Plan (1998)
- The New Biogenic Diet (1995)
- The New Joy of Beauty (1995)
- Raw Energy Food Combining Diet (1996)
- Sleep Deep (1997)
- Lean Revolution (1998)
- Passage to Power; Natural Menopause Revolution (1998)
- Cellulite Revolution (1999)
- The New Raw Energy (2001, with Susannah Kenton)
- Healing Herbs (2002)
- The X-Factor Diet (2002)
- Skin Revolution (2003)
- Raw Juicing (2009)
