= Mount Herbert (electorate) =

Mount Herbert was a parliamentary electorate in the Canterbury Region of New Zealand, from 1866 to 1870.

== Population centres ==
In the 1865 electoral redistribution, the House of Representatives focussed its review of electorates to South Island electorates only, as the Otago gold rush had caused significant population growth, and a redistribution of the existing population. Fifteen additional South Island electorates were created, including Mount Herbert, and the number of Members of Parliament was increased by 13 to 70. The electorate is named after the highest peak (Mount Herbert / Te Ahu Pātiki) on Banks Peninsula.

The 1870 electoral redistribution was undertaken by a parliamentary select committee based on population data from the 1867 New Zealand census. Eight sub-committees were formed, with two members each making decisions for their own province; thus members set their own electorate boundaries. The number of electorates was increased from 61 to 72, and Mount Herbert was abolished in the process, with the vast majority of its area taken up by an enlarged Akaroa electorate.

== History ==
The electorate was first formed for the 1866 election, mostly replacing the Ellesmere electorate, but also gaining some area from the Akaroa electorate. The general election was held on 22 February 1866, and William Sefton Moorhouse was returned unopposed.

Moorhouse also stood in the Westland electorate and was returned 16 March 1866 in favour of William Shaw.

Moorhouse chose to represent Westland. A by-election was held on 27 July 1866 and Thomas Potts was returned unopposed.

== Members ==
Election	Winner
1866 election	William Sefton Moorhouse
1866 by-election	Thomas Potts
