= Cholmondeley Children's Centre =

Cholmondeley Children's Centre (previously known as Cholmondeley Children's Home) provides respite care for children in Governors Bay near Christchurch. Its mission is to provide quality short-term or emergency respite care and education for children, usually between the ages of 3–12 years, and support for their families. The Centre helps families during times of stress or crisis, by providing care to children. Cholmondeley is a registered Child and Family Support Service and has an open-referral policy.

The organisation removed the word 'Home' from its name in April 2013, reflecting a strategic shift to short-term care only, with the aim of preserving the family unit and preventing the need for statutory interventions.

== Location and history ==
Cholmondeley was founded in 1925 as a gift to the region of Canterbury by farmer Hugh Heber Cholmondeley. Following damage from the February 2011 Christchurch earthquake, the historic house was demolished. Between March 2011 and July 2015 the service continued to operate on split sites, with children's accommodation being moved to nearby Bellbird Heights at Living Springs, while education and administration remained on the original site at Cholmondeley Lane. During this time a successful capital fundraising campaign raised $4 million towards the rebuild, and by July 2015 a modern, fit-for-purpose building was completed. On 9 October 2015, the new Centre was officially opened by Prime Minister John Key. Cholmondeley has cared for an estimated 28,000 children since 1925 and as of 2017 cares for more than 500 children each year.
