= Young New Zealand Party =

Political faction in 19th-century New Zealand

The Young New Zealand Party was a faction in the New Zealand Parliament in the 19th century. It predated the creation of political parties as they are understood today.

The Young New Zealand Party was generally reformist in outlook, and would probably be considered left-wing in modern terms. It had connections to the labour movement (particularly miners), to small farmers, and to small businessmen. It was contrasted with another reformist faction, led by Julius Vogel, Robert Stout, and John Ballance. This group pursued a more academic type of reform, focused around socially liberal causes such as women's suffrage and Māori rights. Both groups were originally part of a government led by George Grey, but fractured after Grey's government was defeated.

Key figures in the Young New Zealand Party were William Montgomery (the de facto leader), Richard Seddon, James McGowan, John McKenzie, Joseph Ward and William Hall-Jones. The group had no formal organisation, and had no membership or structure outside Parliament.

Later, many of members of the Young New Zealand Party would, along with members of the other reformist faction, establish the Liberal Party. Three members of the Young New Zealand Party, being Seddon, Ward, and Hall-Jones, would serve as Prime Minister.
