= Alexander McGregor (New Zealand politician) =

New Zealand politician

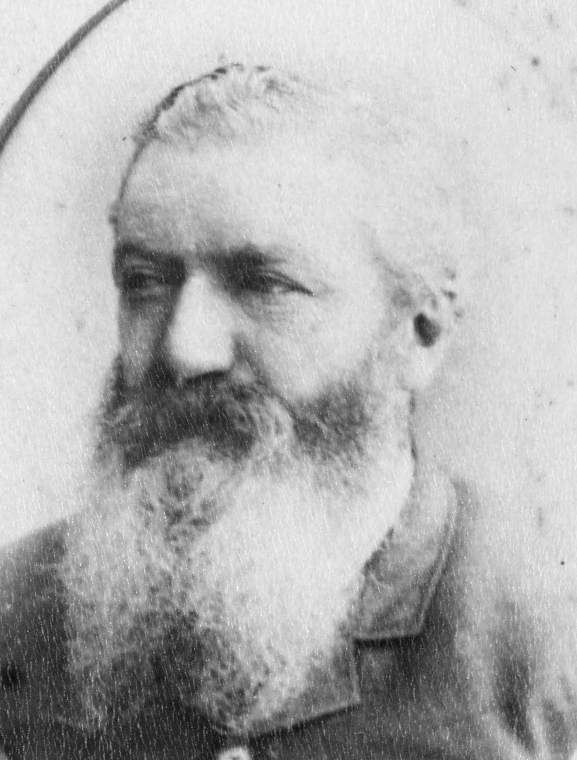
Alexander McGregor, ca 1890

New Zealand Parliament
| Years | Term | Electorate | Party |
|---|---|---|---|
| 1887–1890 | 10th | Akaroa | Independent |

Alexander Innes McGregor (9 May 1838 – 17 January 1901) was a 19th-century Member of Parliament in New Zealand.

He represented the Akaroa electorate from 1887 to 1890 when he was defeated.

He was a mayor of Akaroa. His only daughter, Annie, married Thomas Penlington, the fourth son of William Penlington who also served as mayor of Akaroa.

New Zealand Parliament
| Preceded by William Montgomery | Member of Parliament for Akaroa; 1887–1890 | Succeeded by John Joyce |
Political offices
| Preceded by Thomas Adams | Mayor of Akaroa; 1883–1886 | Succeeded by William Tosswill |
