= Thomas Potts (naturalist) =

New Zealand naturalist, ornithologist, entomologist and botanist (1824–1888)

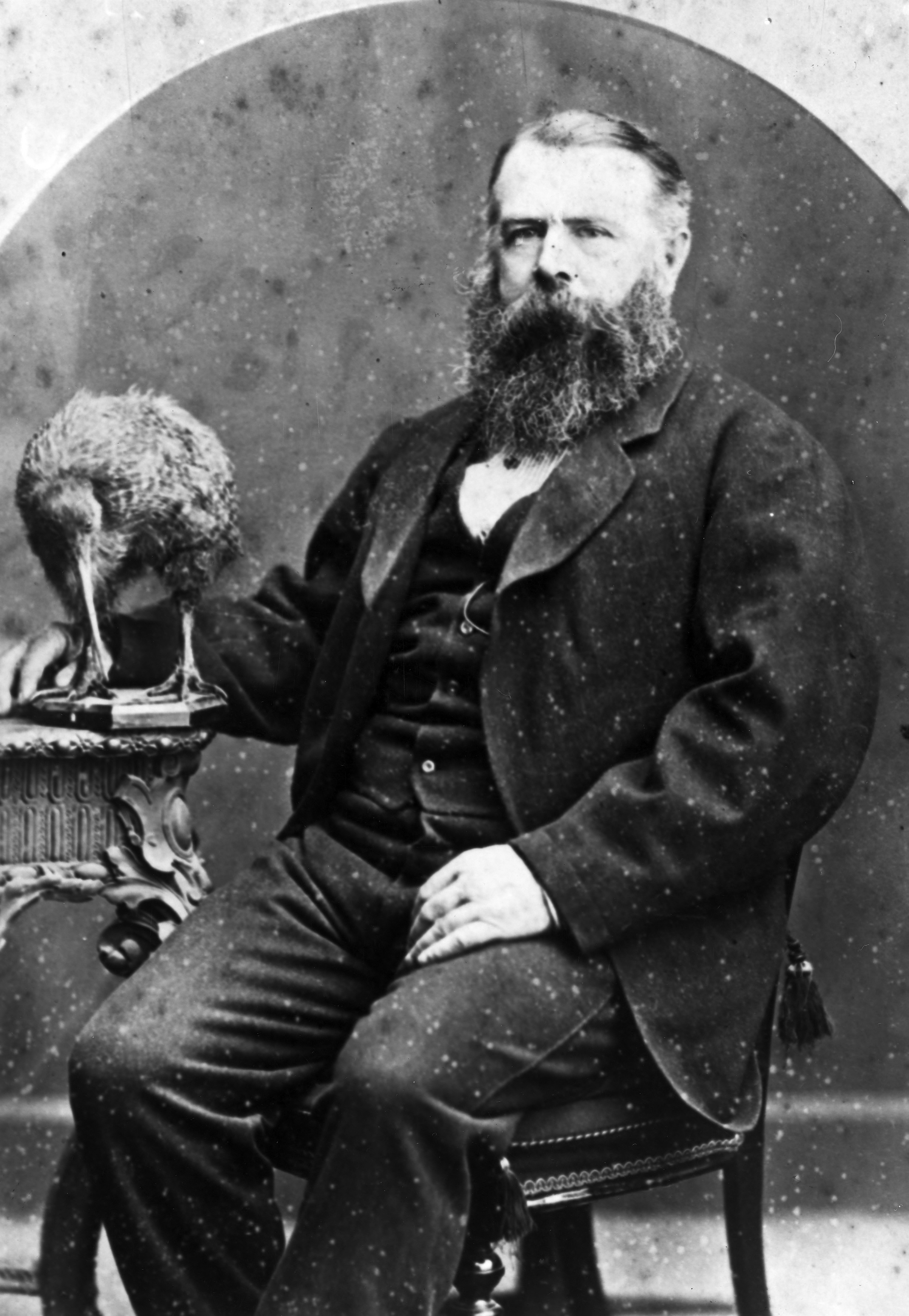
Potts, c. 1875

Thomas Henry Potts (23 November 1824 – 27 July 1888) was a British-born New Zealand naturalist, ornithologist, entomologist, and botanist. He also served in the New Zealand Parliament from 1866 to 1870.

== Biography ==
New Zealand Parliament
Years	Term	Electorate	Party
1866–1870	4th	Mount Herbert	Independent

The son of a small arms manufacturer, he emigrated to New Zealand in 1854, and recorded many natural observations as well as species that were then new to science, such as the black-billed gull and the great spotted kiwi.

In 1866 he was elected to the Mount Herbert electorate after William Sefton Moorhouse who had won the seat in the 1866 general election declined the seat. Potts retired from Parliament in 1870.

In the 1860s and 1870s, Thomas Potts was an early campaigner for areas of New Zealand to be set aside as nature reserves to save many bird species from extinction, after the deforestation of large areas of mainland New Zealand. Potts owned Ohinetahi for several years.

The standard author abbreviation Potts is used to indicate this person as the author when citing a botanical name.

New Zealand Parliament
Preceded by William Moorhouse	Member of Parliament for Mount Herbert; 1866–1870	Constituency abolished
