= Augustus White =

New Zealand politician

Augustus Edward White (1839–?) was a 19th-century Member of Parliament in New Zealand.

New Zealand Parliament
Years	Term	Electorate	Party
1861–1863	3rd	Akaroa	Independent

White was born in 1839. He contested the Akaroa electorate against William Sefton Moorhouse, the incumbent for the seat and Superintendent of the Province of Canterbury. White and Moorhouse received 51 and 32 votes, respectively; a majority of 19 for White, who was thus elected. At the time of his election, he was aged about 22, one of the youngest members in the country's parliamentary history. White resigned in 1863, and Lancelot Walker won the subsequent by-election.

White's house Blythcliffe in 37 Rue Balguerie, Akaroa, is presumed to have been designed by Samuel Farr based on drawings prepared by the Australian architect John Verge. Built in 1857, it was "the grandest house of its day in Akaroa". Originally registered as Category II in 1983, its classification was later changed to Category I.

New Zealand Parliament
Preceded by William Sefton Moorhouse	Member of Parliament for Akaroa; 1861–1863	Succeeded by Lancelot Walker
