= John Cuff (politician) =

New Zealand politician

New Zealand Parliament
Years	Term	Electorate	Party
1855–1858	2nd	Akaroa	Independent

John Cuff (1805 – 6 December 1864) was a New Zealand politician. He represented the Akaroa electorate in the 2nd New Zealand Parliament from 1855 to 1858, but resigned before the end of his term. He did not serve in any subsequent Parliaments.

He died in Christchurch on 6 December 1864 aged 59 years.

New Zealand Parliament
Preceded by William Sefton Moorhouse	Member of Parliament for Akaroa; 1855–1858	Succeeded by William Sefton Moorhouse
