= Akaroa (electorate) =

Akaroa was a New Zealand electorate. It was located in Banks Peninsula, Canterbury, and named after the town of the same name. One of the original 24 electorates, it existed from 1853 to 1893. It was also used as an electorate for Canterbury Province.

== Population centres ==
The Akaroa electorate was named after Akaroa on Banks Peninsula. It covered the peninsula and other rural land near Christchurch. Its boundary was a straight line running due south "from the Conical Rocks midway between the eastern headland of Port Albert, and the western headland of Pigeon Bay, due south across Banks' Peninsula, meeting the sea at the western headland of Island Bay." Its only neighbour was the large, rural electorate of Christchurch Country, which covered most of Canterbury and the West Coast.

In subsequent years, the electorate's boundaries shifted slightly, retreating on the Peninsula's northern coast and expanding on its southern coast (gaining the Kaitorete Spit, between Lake Ellesmere / Te Waihora and the sea).

In the 1871 election, the bulk of Mount Herbert electorate, which covered the land around Lyttelton Harbour except for Lyttelton itself, was absorbed into Akaroa. Later, in the 1887 election, the electorate gained a spur extending almost as far west as Lincoln, but lost this again in the 1890 election. In 1890, the electorate included the town of Lyttelton.

In the 1893 election, Akaroa was merged with the portions of Ellesmere electorate that bordered the lake, with the resulting electorate retaining the name Ellesmere.

== History ==
The electorate of Akaroa was one of the twenty-four original electorates, used in New Zealand's first general election.

The 1866 election was contested by George Armstrong and Lancelot Walker, with Armstrong ahead by just four votes (3.08%).

In the 1887 election, it was contested by no less than six candidates, more than were contesting any other electorate that year (Invercargill was contested by five candidates).

Alexander McGregor, William Barnett, George Armstrong, George Russell Joblin, Frederick Arthur Anson, and John Edward Thacker received 425, 145, 142, 126, 114 and 52 votes, respectively.

The Lyttelton electorate was abolished for the 1890 election election and the town became part of the Akaroa electorate. Lyttelton's incumbent, John Joyce contested the election against McGregor and William Barnett. Joyce defeated McGregor by 750 to 647 votes, with Barnett coming a distant third.

=== Members of Parliament ===
Key

Independent Liberal

Election	Winner
1853 election	William Moorhouse
1855 election	John Cuff
1858 by-election	William Moorhouse
1861 election	Augustus White
1863 by-election	Lancelot Walker
1866 election	George Armstrong
1871 election	Robert Rhodes
1874 (1st) by-election	William Montgomery
1874 (2nd) by-election	William Montgomery
1875 election	William Montgomery
1879 election	William Montgomery
1881 election	William Montgomery
1884 election	William Montgomery
1887 election	Alexander McGregor
1890 election	John Joyce
(Electorate abolished 1893, see Ellesmere)

== Election results ==
=== 1890 election ===
1890 general election: Akaroa
Party	Candidate	Votes	%	±%
Liberal	John Joyce	750	48.99	
Conservative	Alexander McGregor	643	41.99	
Independent	William Barnett	138	9.02	
Majority		107	6.98	
Turnout		1,531	76.20	
Registered electors		2,009		

=== April 1874 by-election ===
April 1874 Akaroa by-election
Party	Candidate	Votes	%	±%
Independent	William Montgomery	168	68.85	
Independent	Walter Pilliet	76	31.15	
Turnout		244		
Majority		92	37.70	

=== 1866 election ===
1866 general election: Akaroa
Party	Candidate	Votes	%	±%
Independent	George Armstrong	67	51.54	
Independent	Lancelot Walker	63	48.46	
Majority		4	3.08	
Turnout		130		
Registered electors				

=== 1853 election ===
1853 general election: Akaroa
Party	Candidate	Votes	%	±%
Independent	William Sefton Moorhouse	27	61.36	
Independent	Robert Heaton Rhodes	17	38.64	
Majority		10	22.73	
Turnout		44	97.78	
Registered electors		45		
