= William Sefton Moorhouse =

New Zealand politician

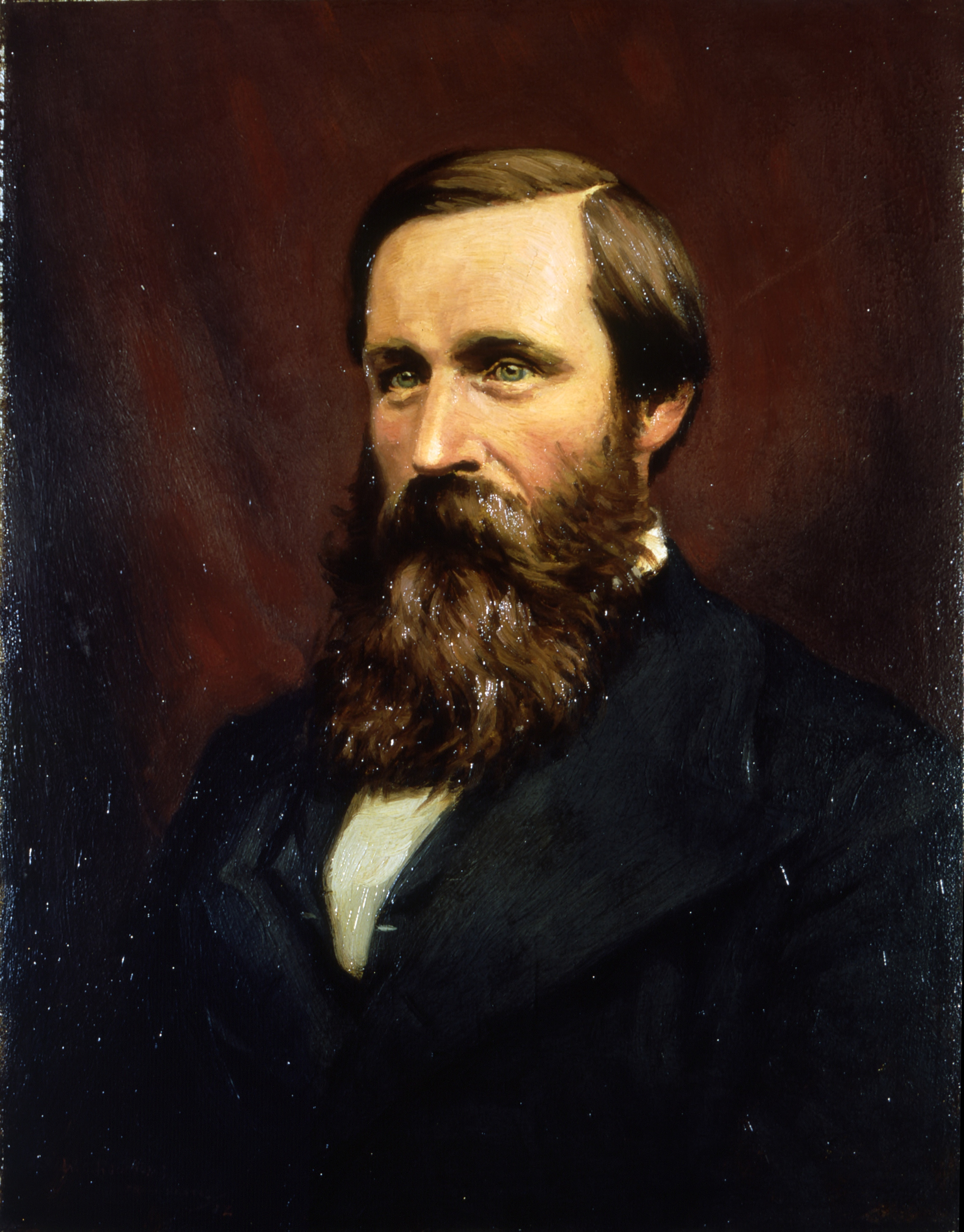
- Portrait of W. S. Moorhouse by Walter Armiger Bowring, circa 1900

2nd Superintendent of Canterbury Province
- In office 24 Oct 1857 – Feb 1863
- In office 30 May 1866 – May 1868

3rd Mayor of Wellington
- In office 1875–1875
- Preceded by: Charles Borlase
- Succeeded by: William Hutchison

Personal details
- Born: December 1825 Yorkshire, England
- Died: 15 September 1881 (aged 55) Wellington, New Zealand
- Spouse: Jane Ann(e) Collins
- Relations: William Barnard Rhodes (brother-in-law); John Studholme (brother-in-law); Thomas Henry Wigley (brother-in-law)

William Sefton Moorhouse (c. 1825 – 15 September 1881) was a New Zealand politician. He was the second Superintendent of Canterbury Province.

== Early life ==
Moorhouse was born in Yorkshire, England, and baptised on 18 December 1825; the oldest son of William Moorhouse, a magistrate, and his wife, Ann Carter. He trained as a lawyer, entering as a student at the Middle Temple in November 1847, and was called to the Bar in November 1860. After working for a time in London, he moved to Lyttelton, New Zealand, with his two brothers (Benjamin and Thomas) in 1851. Soon afterwards, he moved to Wellington, where he resumed his law practice.

He married Jane Ann(e) Collins on 15 December 1853 in Old St. Paul's, Wellington. He then briefly travelled to Australia, leaving with his wife on the barque Tory on 16 December for Melbourne.

He subsequently returned to Lyttelton, and then moved to Christchurch, where he acted as a lawyer, magistrate, newspaper editor, and ship owner. One of his sisters, Sarah Ann Moorhouse, married William Barnard Rhodes. Another, Lucy Ellen Sykes Moorhouse, married John Studholme. Another, Mary Moorhouse, married Thomas Henry Wigley.

== Political career ==
Moorhouse was active both in national and provincial politics, and later was a Mayor of Wellington.

=== House of Representatives ===
New Zealand Parliament
Years	Term	Electorate	Party
1853–1855	1st	Akaroa	Independent
1858–1860	2nd	Akaroa	Independent
1862–1863	3rd	Heathcote	Independent
1866–1867	4th	Westland	Independent
1867–1868	4th	Westland Boroughs	Independent
1870	4th	Christchurch	Independent
1875–1879	6th	Christchurch	Independent
1879–1881	7th	Ashley	Independent

Moorhouse was elected to represent Akaroa in the 1st New Zealand Parliament. He was defeated in his bid for re-election in 1855, the year in which he was first elected to the Canterbury Provincial Council, but retained the seat in a by-election in 1858. By this time he had become the Superintendent for Canterbury in October 1857.

After another defeat in Akaroa in 1860, Moorhouse won the Heathcote by-election in 1862. In the 1866 election, he had won both the Mount Herbert and Westland electorates, and chose to represent the latter. The Westland Representation Act 1867 introduced changes to the Waimea and Westland electorates. Their areas were reassigned and four electorates formed. As a result, Westland was abolished in 1867, a new electorate (Westland Boroughs) was established, and the Act stipulated that the sitting member (Moorhouse) was transferred to it. Other new electorates, for which by-elections were to be held, were Westland North and Westland South. Moorhouse resigned from Westland Boroughs on 20 February 1868, and William Henry Harrison won the resulting by-election.

Moorhouse represented Christchurch from the 1870 by-election to the 1871 election. He stood unsuccessfully for Egmont in the 1872 by-election. At the 21 December 1875 election, he stood in the City of Christchurch electorate for the 6th New Zealand Parliament and was returned in third position in this three-member electorate; the other members returned in the election were Edward Richardson and Edward Cephas John Stevens.

Finally he stood successfully for Ashley at the 1879 election which he held until his death in 1881.

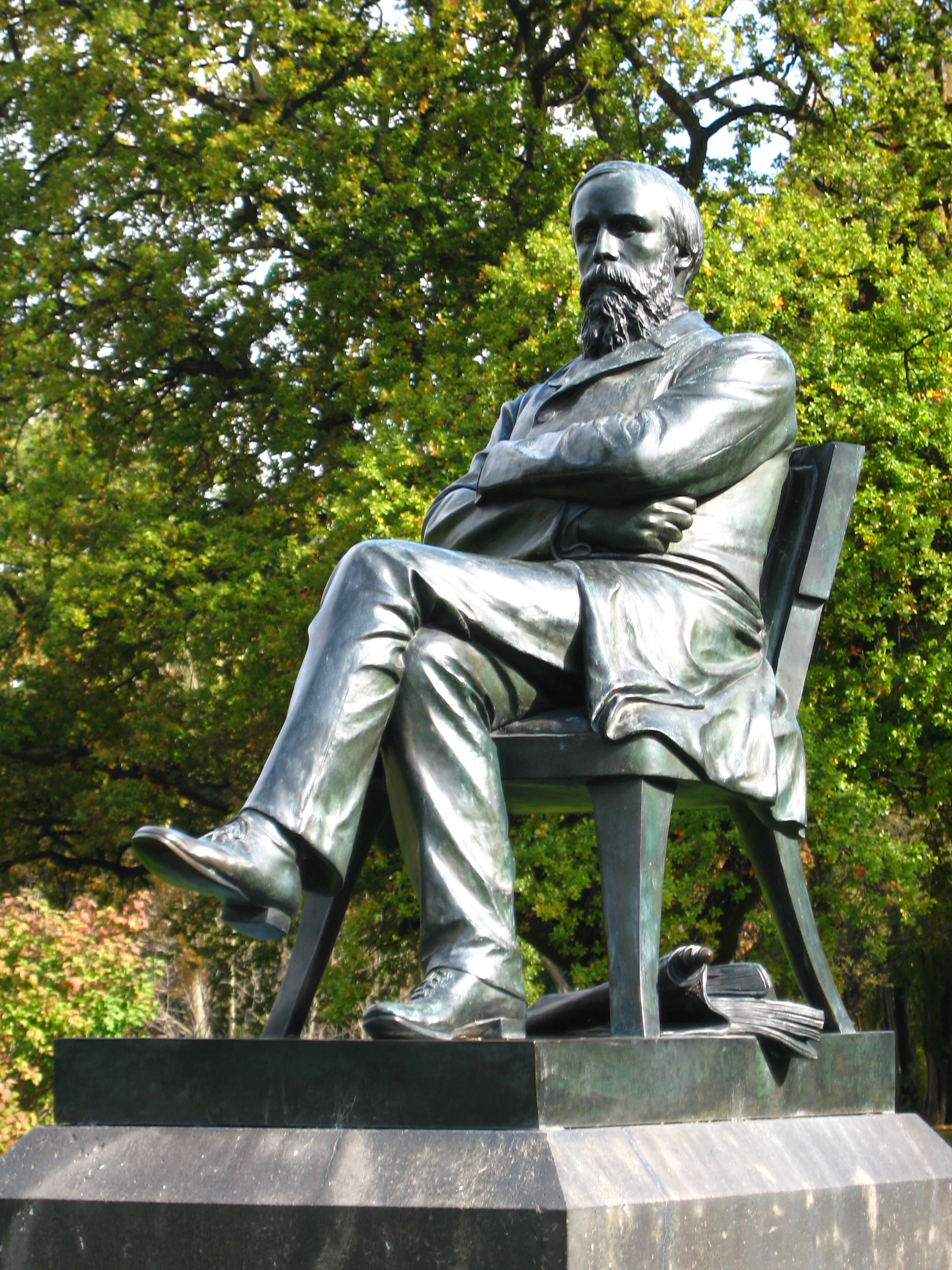
Statue of Moorhouse in the Christchurch Botanic Gardens

=== Canterbury Provincial Council ===
In the provincial elections of August 1853, Moorhouse stood in the Akaroa electorate for one of two positions on the Canterbury Provincial Council. There was a draw for second place and the returning officer gave his casting vote to the other candidate, Rev. William Aylmer. A week earlier, Moorhouse had stood in the same electorate for the House of Representatives and had been successful. In 1855, Moorhouse was first elected to the Canterbury Provincial Council. From March to July 1855, he represented the Akaroa electorate on the first Council. He later served as the Province's Superintendent after James FitzGerald resigned from the superintendency in October 1857 due to illness. Moorhouse and Joseph Brittan contested the vacancy, and obtained 727 and 352 votes, respectively.

During the 1857 election he supported construction of the Lyttelton Rail Tunnel although both Brittan and FitzGerald thought such a long expensive tunnel too risky for a small colony and favoured a longer rail connection via Sumner with a short tunnel or a horse tramway over Gollans Pass.

He served as Superintendent until February 1863, and another term from May 1866 to May 1868. After his first superintendency, he represented the Kaiapoi electorate as a provincial councillor from March to October 1863, and then represented the Heathcote electorate from February 1864 to May 1866. From 27 October to 17 November 1863, he was a member of the Canterbury Executive Council.

== Later years ==
He was Mayor of Wellington in 1875, and died in Wellington on 15 September 1881. He had diabetes, and had had an operation for an abscess. After a funeral in Wellington his body was returned to Christchurch for a funeral and then burial at Riccarton. The Legislative Council adjourned as a mark of respect. A statue to him in Christchurch was proposed.

He was survived by his wife Jane and five children. The children (born from 1859 to 1867) were a son William Harold Sefton, three daughters Alice Jane, Hilda and Jessie, and a child born in 1865 whose name was not recorded on the birth entry.

== Commemoration ==
In 1904, the South Belt or South Town Belt in Christchurch was renamed Moorhouse Avenue in honour of the former Superintendent. Each Christchurch Avenue around the central city is named for one of the former Superintendents, and it was thought appropriate to rename the South Belt for Moorhouse, as it was parallel to the railway line and continued via Ferry Road towards the railway tunnel, two projects that were closely linked to Moorhouse. The eastern continuation of the South Belt was called Junction Street or Junction Road, until its intersection with Ferry Road. In 1909, this section was incorporated into Moorhouse Avenue. Julius von Haast named the Moorhouse Range and Sefton Peak in the Southern Alps after Moorhouse. Moorhouse and Sefton Streets in the Wellington suburb of Wadestown are also named for him. A statue of Moorhouse, made by George Anderson Lawson in London in 1885, is located in the Christchurch Botanic Gardens.

== Sources ==
- Irvine-Smith, F. L. (1948). The Streets of My City. Wellington: A. H. & A. W. Reed.
- Scholefield, Guy (1950) [First ed. published 1913]. New Zealand Parliamentary Record, 1840–1949 (3rd ed.). Wellington: Govt. Printer.

New Zealand Parliament
New constituency	Member of Parliament for Akaroa; 1853–1855; 1858–1860	Succeeded by John Cuff
Preceded by John Cuff	Member of Parliament for Akaroa; 1853–1855; 1858–1860	Succeeded by Augustus White
New constituency	Member of Parliament for Mount Herbert; 1866	Succeeded by Thomas Potts
New constituency	Member of Parliament for Westland; 1866–1868	Vacant Constituency abolished, recreated in 1890 Title next held by Richard Seddon
Preceded by William Travers	Member of Parliament for Christchurch; 1870; 1875–1879 alongside: Edward Richardson, Edward Stevens	In abeyance Title next held by himself
In abeyance Title last held by himself	Member of Parliament for Christchurch; 1870; 1875–1879 alongside: Edward Richardson, Edward Stevens	Succeeded by Samuel Paull Andrews
Preceded by John Evans Brown	Member of Parliament for Ashley; 1879–1881	Succeeded by William Fisher Pearson
Political offices
Preceded by James FitzGerald	Superintendent of Canterbury Province; 1857–1863 1866–1868	Succeeded by Samuel Bealey
Preceded by Samuel Bealey	Superintendent of Canterbury Province; 1857–1863 1866–1868	Succeeded by William Rolleston
Preceded by Charles Borlase	Mayor of Wellington; 1875	Succeeded by William Hutchison
