= Alec Monteith =

New Zealand politician

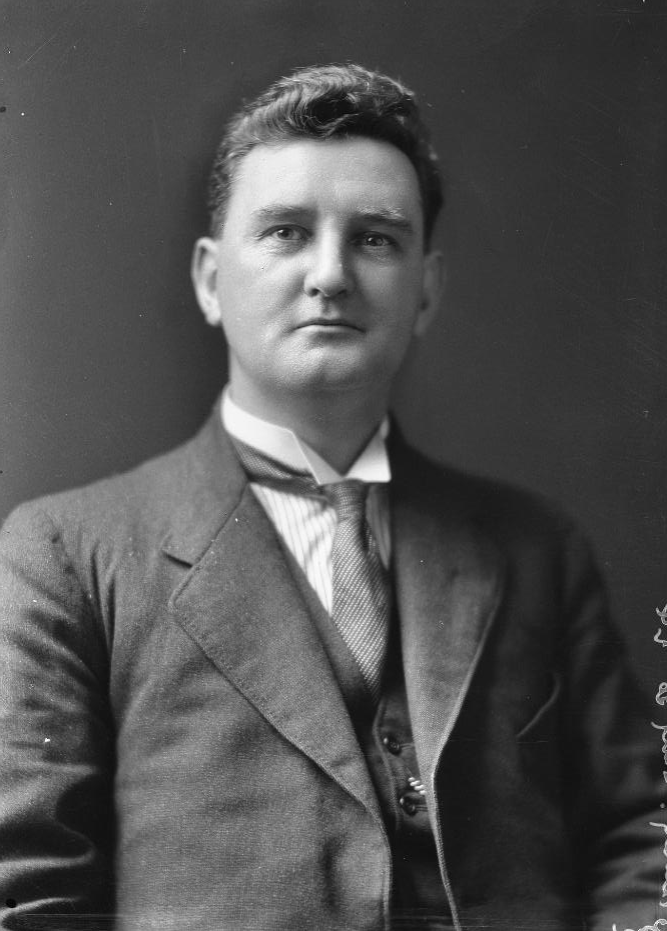

Member of the New Zealand Parliament for Wellington East
- In office 7 December 1922 – 4 November 1925
- Preceded by: Alfred Newman
- Succeeded by: Thomas Forsyth

Personal details
- Born: 15 December 1886 Woodville, New Zealand
- Died: 24 November 1972 (aged 85) Auckland, New Zealand
- Party: Labour
- Spouse: Eva Monteith

Alexander Lamont Monteith (15 December 1886 – 24 November 1972) was a New Zealand trade unionist and politician who served Member of Parliament for the Labour Party for Wellington East from 1922 to 1925.

== Biography ==
=== Early life and career ===
Monteith was born in Woodville, the son of Sarah Ann Monteith (née Carter) and Charles Forrester Monteith, and was a farmer and storeman. He was secretary of the United Storemen's Union and later secretary of the Wellington Tramways Union and the New Zealand Tramway Workers' Federation.

=== Political career ===
New Zealand Parliament
Years	Term	Electorate	Party
1922–1925	21st	Wellington East	Labour

In 1918, Monteith was nominated by the Soft Goods and Storeman's Union for the Labour nomination in the Wellington South by-election, but was defeated by Bob Semple. At the 1919 election, he was the Labour candidate in the Wellington East electorate, but was defeated by the Reform Party incumbent, Alfred Newman.

Monteith represented the Wellington East electorate in the New Zealand House of Representatives between 1922 and 1925. In the 1922 election, he was one of four candidates, with Thomas Forsyth of the Reform Party coming second. In the 1925 election, he was beaten by Forsyth. Monteith was also a member of the Wellington City Council from 1923 until 1926 when he resigned.

Monteith later sought the Labour nomination for the 1936 by-election in the Manukau seat, but was beaten by Arthur Osborne.

=== Later life and death ===
For 21 years, from 1926 to 1947, the worker's assessor at New Zealand's Arbitration Court.

Monteith died on 24 November 1972 at Green Lane Hospital in Auckland, survived by five sons and two daughters. He had been admitted to hospital five weeks earlier following a stroke.

== Notes ==
New Zealand Parliament
Preceded by Alfred Newman	Member of Parliament for Wellington East; 1922–1925	Succeeded by Thomas Forsyth
