= Fisher & Paykel Healthcare =

New Zealand public company

Fisher & Paykel Healthcare Corporation Limited
- Company type: Public
- Traded as: NZX: FPH; S&P/NZX 50 component; ASX: FPH; S&P/ASX 50 component
- ISIN: NZFAPE0001S2
- Industry: Healthcare devices
- Founded: 1934; 92 years ago
- Founder: Maurice Paykel & Sir Woolf Fisher
- Headquarters: East Tāmaki, Auckland, New Zealand
- Key people: Lewis Gradon, Managing Director and CEO
- Products: CPAP, Respiratory Humidifiers, Neonatal Care
- Revenue: ▲NZ$1263 million (2020)
- Operating income: ▲NZ$379 million (2020)
- Net income: ▲NZ$287 million (2020)
- Number of employees: 5,081(2020)
- Website: www.fphcare.com

Fisher & Paykel Healthcare Corporation Limited (FPH) is a manufacturer, designer and marketer of products and systems for use in respiratory care, acute care, and the treatment of obstructive sleep apnea. Based in New Zealand, their products and systems are sold in around 120 countries worldwide. FPH is primarily an exporting company, with just 1 percent of revenue coming from New Zealand sales.

== History ==
Fisher & Paykel began in 1934 as an importer of refrigerators, washing machines and radios. In 1938, F&P signed an agreement with Kelvinator and in the mid-1950s moved to manufacturing products using the company's own technology.

The involvement in healthcare started in the late 1960s when F&P sought involvement in a business that could benefit from their growing manufacturing and electronic expertise. A prototype respiratory humidifier, developed in New Zealand for use with patients being ventilated in hospital intensive care situations, was taken to the production stage by F&P. Continuing product innovation to improve patient care and development of a world-wide distribution network are two core strengths.

The company was separated and was also listed on the stock exchange on 14 November 2001. As part of a reorganization, Fisher & Paykel Industries Limited was renamed Fisher & Paykel Healthcare Corporation Limited and a new company, Fisher & Paykel Appliances Holdings Limited, was established to own F&P's appliances and finance business.

In connection with the reorganisation, Fisher & Paykel Healthcare Corporation Limited listed on the Australian and New Zealand Stock Exchanges and Nasdaq. In February 2003 the Nasdaq listing was terminated.

== Business areas ==
The company maintains focus on two major product groups.

=== Respiratory and acute care ===
Respiratory humidifiers, single-use and reusable chambers and breathing circuits and accessories. These are designed to humidify and deliver the gases that a patient receives during mechanical ventilation, non-invasive ventilation, oxygen therapy, and laparoscopic surgery.

Their neonatal care products include infant warmers to help maintain normal body temperature, infant resuscitators and CPAP systems designed to improve infant respiratory function.

=== Obstructive sleep apnea ===
Continuous positive airway pressure (CPAP) therapy products, which are used in the treatment of obstructive sleep apnoea to prevent temporary airway closure during sleep. Their products, including integrated flow generator-humidifiers, are designed to deliver humidified airflow to patients during CPAP therapy.

== Manufacturing ==
They manufacture, assemble and test their complete range of products, including many components, at their facilities in New Zealand with a total area of approximately 560,000 ft^{2} (51,000 m^{2}). An additional manufacturing facility was established in Tijuana, Mexico, in 2010. The Tijuana facility was responsible for approximately 30% of the company's total production volume, and approximately 50% of all products sold in the US, in 2015. A second Tijuana manufacturing facility was completed in January 2019. A third facility in Mexico was being planned in 2020.
