= 1936 Manukau by-election =

New Zealand by-election

- 30 September 1936
- Turnout: 12,591 (78.69%)
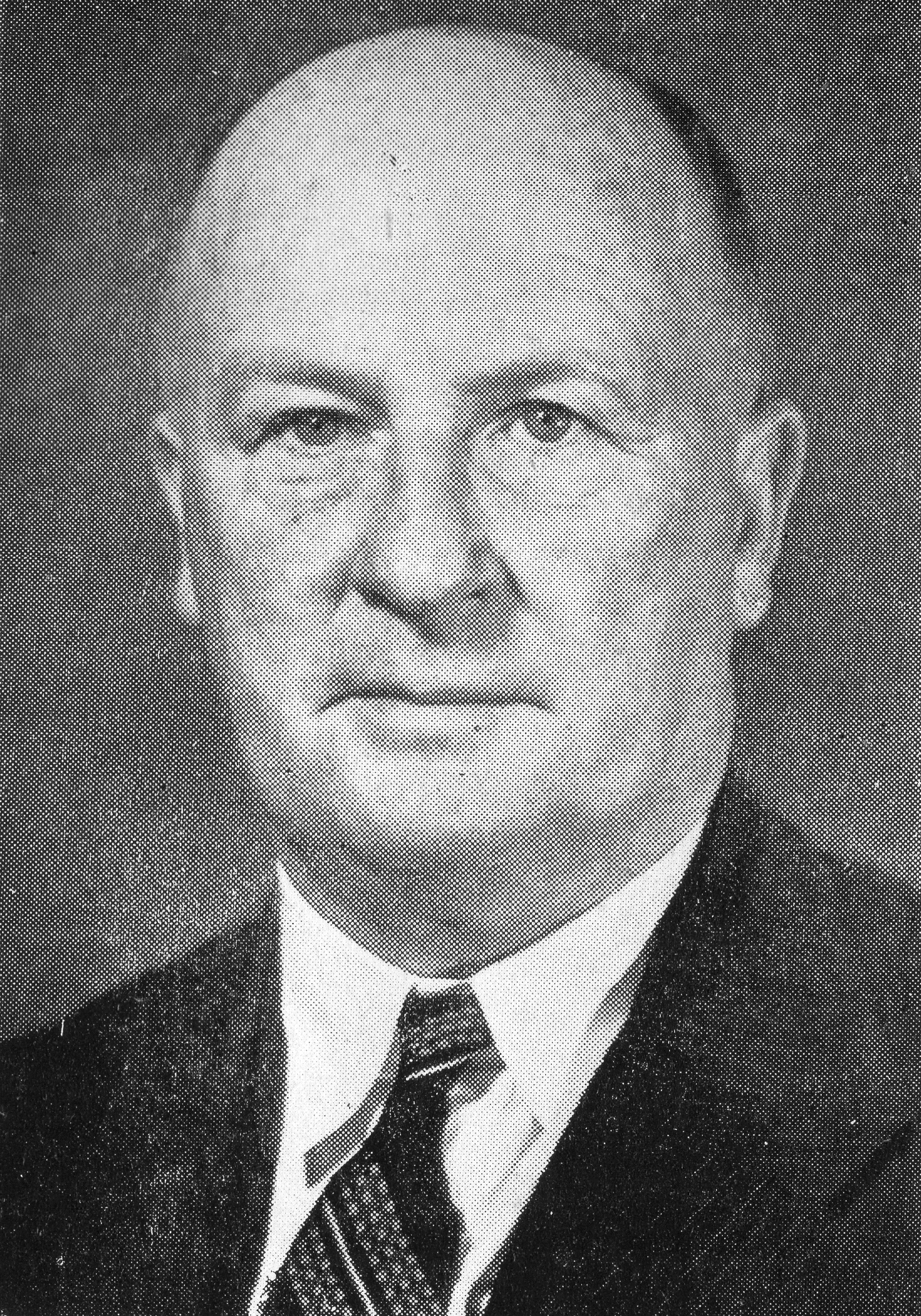

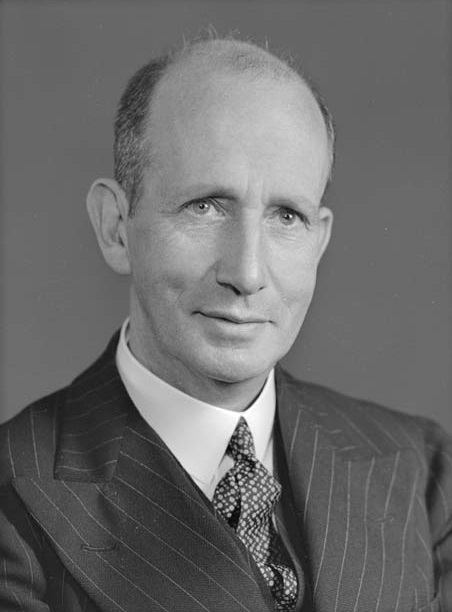
Candidate	Arthur Osborne	Frederick Doidge
Party	Labour	National
Popular vote	8,593	3,998
Percentage	68.24%	31.75%
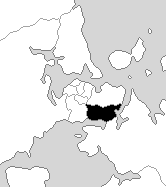
- Manukau electorate boundaries used for the by-election
MP before election
Bill Jordan
Labour
Elected MP
Arthur Osborne
Labour

The 1936 Manukau by-election was a by-election during the 25th New Zealand Parliament in the Manukau electorate. It was held on Wednesday 30 September 1936. This by-election came about because of the resignation of Bill Jordan upon his appointment to the position of High Commissioner to the UK during the term of the 25th New Zealand Parliament. The by-election in the Manukau electorate was contested by Arthur Osborne for Labour and Frederick Doidge for National, with Osborne winning the election.

== Background and candidates ==
A by-election was triggered due to Bill Jordan's resignation upon his appointment to the post of High Commissioner to the United Kingdom.

=== Labour ===
The Labour party chose Arthur Osborne as their candidate for the seat. He had previously contested the Waitemata electorate unsuccessfully in the 1925, 1928, and 1931 elections. In the 1935 election, he unsuccessfully contested the Parnell electorate.

The unsuccessful nominees for the Labour candidacy were Mary Dreaver, Alec Monteith and James Purtell.

=== National ===
The newly created National Party chose Frederick Doidge as their contestant for the seat. In the 1935 election, Doidge ran as an independent in the Rotorua electorate, despite briefly courting the anti-Labour Democrat Party. Of the four candidates, he came second after Labour's Alexander Moncur. As a new party this was National's first real electoral test to see if the unification of the United, Reform & Democrat parties would be able to combat Labour more effectively.

== Results ==
The following table contains the results of the by-election:

1936 Manukau by-election
Party	Candidate	Votes	%	±%
Labour	Arthur Osborne	8,593	68.24	
National	Frederick Doidge	3,998	31.75	
Informal votes		22	0.17	−0.40
Majority		4,595	36.49	
Turnout		12,591	78.69	−11.10

The Manukau electorate was abolished at the next election in 1938. Osborne shifted to the new seat of Onehunga, which he held until his death in 1953. Doidge later represented the electorate of Tauranga for National from 1938 to 1951, when he retired.
