= Maurice O'Rorke =

New Zealand politician

The Honourable Sir Maurice O'Rorke
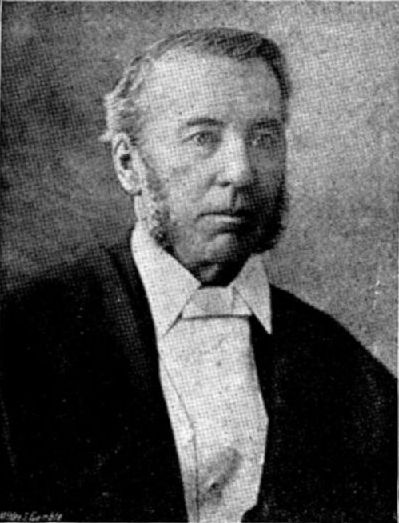
- George Maurice O’Rorke

5th Speaker of the House of Representatives
- In office 1879–1890
- Prime Minister: John Hall
- In office 1894–1902
- Prime Minister: Richard Seddon

Member of the New Zealand Parliament for Onehunga (previously Town of Onehunga)
- In office 1861–1881

Member of the New Zealand Parliament for Manukau
- In office 1881–1890
- In office 1893–1902

8th Superintendent of Auckland Province
- In office February 1875 – March 1875

Personal details
- Born: 2 May 1830 Moylough, County Galway, Ireland
- Died: 25 August 1916 (aged 86) Auckland, New Zealand
- Party: Liberal
- Spouse: Cecilia Mary Shepherd
- Relations: Alexander Shepherd (father-in-law)
- Children: Edward

Sir George Maurice O’Rorke (2 May 1830 – 25 August 1916) was a New Zealand politician, representing (as George O’Rorke) the Auckland seat of Onehunga, and later Manukau, and was Speaker of the House of Representatives. He was a committed provincialist and was the eighth Superintendent of the Auckland Province. Upon receiving his knighthood in 1880, he became known as Sir Maurice.

== Early life ==
O’Rorke was born in Moylough, County Galway, Ireland, the third son of the Rev John O’Rorke (an Anglican minister and large landowner) and his third wife Elizabeth (née Dennis). He went to Trinity College, Dublin, getting a B.A. with high honours in classics in 1852. Immediately after finishing his university education, he sailed for Melbourne, Australia. Whilst this was the time of the Victorian gold rush, this was not his motivation. Rather, he had had an uncle, Henry Dennis, who had settled as a squatter in the Darling Downs in the early 1840s, but who had perished in the sinking of the Sovereign near Moreton Bay in 1847. After working in Victoria, Australia, on a farm, he came to Auckland in 1854, farming in Papakura and Onehunga, Auckland. During the New Zealand Wars, he served as a Captain in the Auckland Militia.

== Career ==
New Zealand Parliament
Years	Term	Electorate	Party
1861–1866	3rd	Town of Onehunga	Independent
1866–1871	4th	Town of Onehunga	Independent
1871–1875	5th	Onehunga	Independent
1875–1879	6th	Onehunga	Independent
1879–1881	7th	Onehunga	Independent
1881–1884	8th	Manukau	Independent
1884–1887	9th	Manukau	Independent
1887–1890	10th	Manukau	Independent
1893–1896	12th	Manukau	Liberal
1896–1899	13th	Manukau	Liberal
1899–1902	14th	Manukau	Liberal

He represented Onehunga, which became Manukau, from 1861 to 1902, except for 1891–1893 when he was out of Parliament. He was Minister of Immigration and Crown Lands 1873–1874 in the Waterhouse, Fox and Vogel ministries, during which time the settlers of Mauriceville named their settlement in his honour, but he was later sacked by Vogel, dissatisfied with his performance. He supported the Provincial system in New Zealand, and spoke out against its abolition by Vogel. He served as Chairman of Committees from 1871 to 1872.

O'Rorke served on the Auckland Provincial Council as councillor from November 1865 to October 1876. From December 1865, he served as the council's 3rd (and last) Speaker. He was elected Superintendent in 1875 for a period of five weeks.

He was a notable Speaker of the House, serving from 11 July 1879 to 5 November 1902, except for 1891–1893. He supported education, and was in favour of Imperial Federation.

He was knighted in 1880, when he became Sir Maurice, although he had previously used George as his Christian name. In 1904 he was appointed to the Legislative Council, where he served until his death.

The student residential hall, O'Rorke Hall at the University of Auckland, is named after him.

== Polo ==
A polo player, he was the Captain of the Auckland Polo Club.

== Personal life ==
In 1858 he married Cecilia Mary Shepherd, daughter of Alexander Shepherd, the second Colonial Treasurer. They had one son, Edward (Eddie) Dennis O’Rorke (father of the architect Brian O'Rorke). Cecilia died on 19 September 1910. Sir Maurice died in Auckland in 1916, survived by his son.

== Notes ==
Political offices
Preceded by Hugh Carleton	Chairman of Committees of the House of Representatives; 1871–1872; 1875–1879	Succeeded by Arthur Seymour
Preceded by Arthur Seymour	Chairman of Committees of the House of Representatives; 1871–1872; 1875–1879	Succeeded by Arthur Seymour
Preceded by John Bathgate	Minister of Justice; 1874	Succeeded by Charles Bowen
Preceded by William Fitzherbert	Speaker of the New Zealand House of Representatives; 1879–1890; 1894–1902	Succeeded by William Steward
Preceded by William Steward	Speaker of the New Zealand House of Representatives; 1879–1890; 1894–1902	Succeeded by Arthur Guinness
Preceded by John Williamson	Superintendent of Auckland Province; 1875	Succeeded by George Grey
New Zealand Parliament
New constituency	Member of Parliament for Onehunga; Named Town of Onehunga until 1871; 1861–1881	Vacant Constituency abolished, recreated in 1938 Title next held by Arthur Osborne
New constituency	Member of Parliament for Manukau; 1881–1890; 1893–1902	Succeeded by Frank Buckland
Preceded by Frank Buckland	Member of Parliament for Manukau; 1881–1890; 1893–1902	Succeeded by Matthew Kirkbride
