= Matthew Kirkbride =

New Zealand politician (1848–1906)

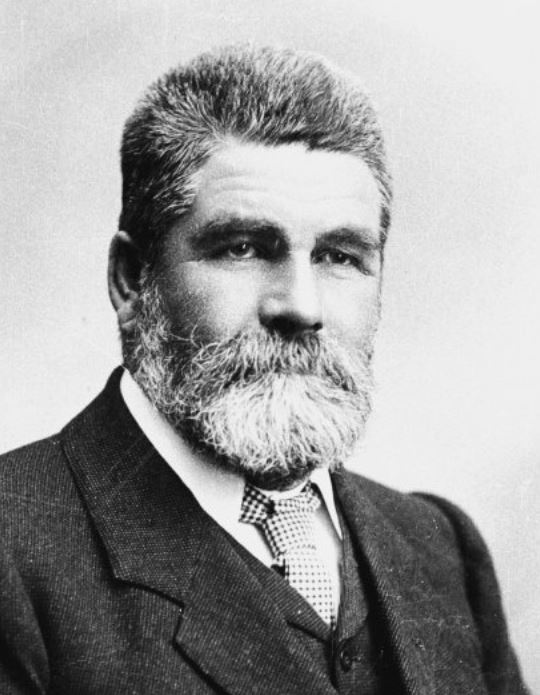
Kirkbride c. 1902

Matthew Middlewood Kirkbride (13 August 1848 – 4 November 1906) was an independent conservative Member of Parliament in New Zealand.

== Biography ==
New Zealand Parliament
Years	Term	Electorate	Party
1902–1905	15th	Manukau	Independent
1905–1906	16th	Manukau	Independent

Born in Ulleskelf in Yorkshire, Kirkbride arrived in New Zealand in July 1863.

He was a friend and neighbour of William Massey, with whom he shared positions on local government. Kirkbride was one of the people who persuaded Massey in 1893 to stand for Parliament; Massey was beaten in Franklin that year, but was successful in an 1894 by-election.

Kirkbride was elected to the Manukau electorate in the 1902 election, when he defeated the incumbent, Maurice O'Rorke. He won the 1905 election against Liberal Ralph Duncan Stewart. He held the Manukau electorate until he died in 1906. His death caused the 6 December 1906 by-election in Manukau, which was won by Frederic Lang.

== Notes ==
New Zealand Parliament
Preceded by Maurice O'Rorke	Member of Parliament for Manukau; 1902–1906	Succeeded by Frederic Lang
