= Kōpuaranga =

Rural locality in Wellington Region, New Zealand

- Locality
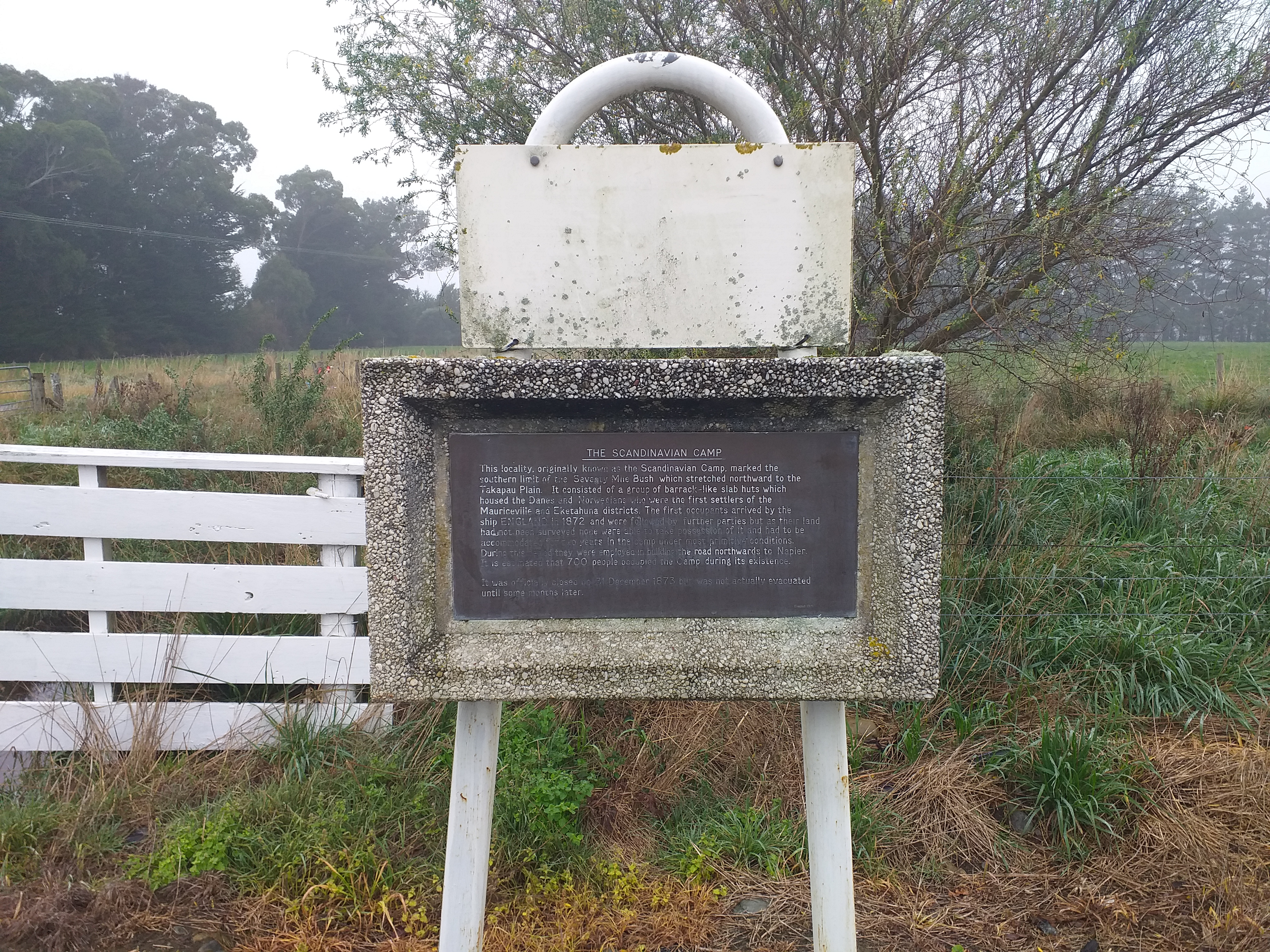
- Scandinavian camp memorial
- Interactive map of Kōpuaranga
- Coordinates: 40°50′S 175°40′E
- Country: New Zealand
- Region: Wellington Region
- Territorial authority: Masterton District
- Ward: Masterton/Whakaoriori General Ward; Masterton/Whakaoriori Māori Ward
- Electorates: Wairarapa; Ikaroa-Rāwhiti (Māori)

Government
  - Territorial Authority: Masterton District Council
  - Regional council: Greater Wellington Regional Council
  - Mayor of Masterton: Bex Johnson
  - Wairarapa MP: Mike Butterick
  - Ikaroa-Rāwhiti MP: Cushla Tangaere-Manuel

Area
  - Total: 61.69 km^{2} (23.82 sq mi)

Population (2023 census)
  - Total: 171
  - Density: 2.77/km^{2} (7.18/sq mi)

Kōpuaranga, until 1906 called Dreyerton, is a rural locality in the Wairarapa region of New Zealand's North Island, between Masterton and Mauriceville.

== Etymology ==
The name Kōpuaranga comes from Māori words meaning 'deep hole' and 'shoal of fish'.

== History ==
The area was a temporary camp used by Scandinavians who had been brought in to clear and settle the Seventy Mile Bush, but could not take up their allotted land until it had been surveyed, and the area was thus known simply as The Camp or The Scandinavian Camp, the camp was officially closed on 31 December 1873, and an estimated 700 people had occupied the camp during its existence.

In 1876 a Post Office was opened, named Opaki, however the settlement's name was changed to Dreyerton in 1881, after Danish interpreter Alexander Svend Dreyer, who had accompanied the pioneers and conceived the idea for a township.

Dreyerton school was founded in 1885, and in 1897 the school had an average attendance of about forty. One amusing incident during the school's history was the school committee election of 1889, which fell through when only the committee members arrived, and refused to vote for themselves. The school was closed in 1975. It is a category 2 historic site.

The name was changed to Kopuaranga in 1906, after the government assigned railway stations Māori language names. The Wellington Education Board then changed the name of the local school to match the station, and the name of the settlement changed also. Kopuaranga railway station eventually closed in 1983. In December 2019, the approved official geographic name of the locality was gazetted as "Kōpuaranga".

== Demographics ==
Kōpuaranga locality has an area of 61.69 km^{2} (23.82 sq mi) It is part of the larger Kōpuaranga statistical area.

Historical population for the locality
Year	Pop.	±% p.a.
2006	141	—
2013	141	+0.00%
2018	147	+0.84%
2023	171	+3.07%
Source:.

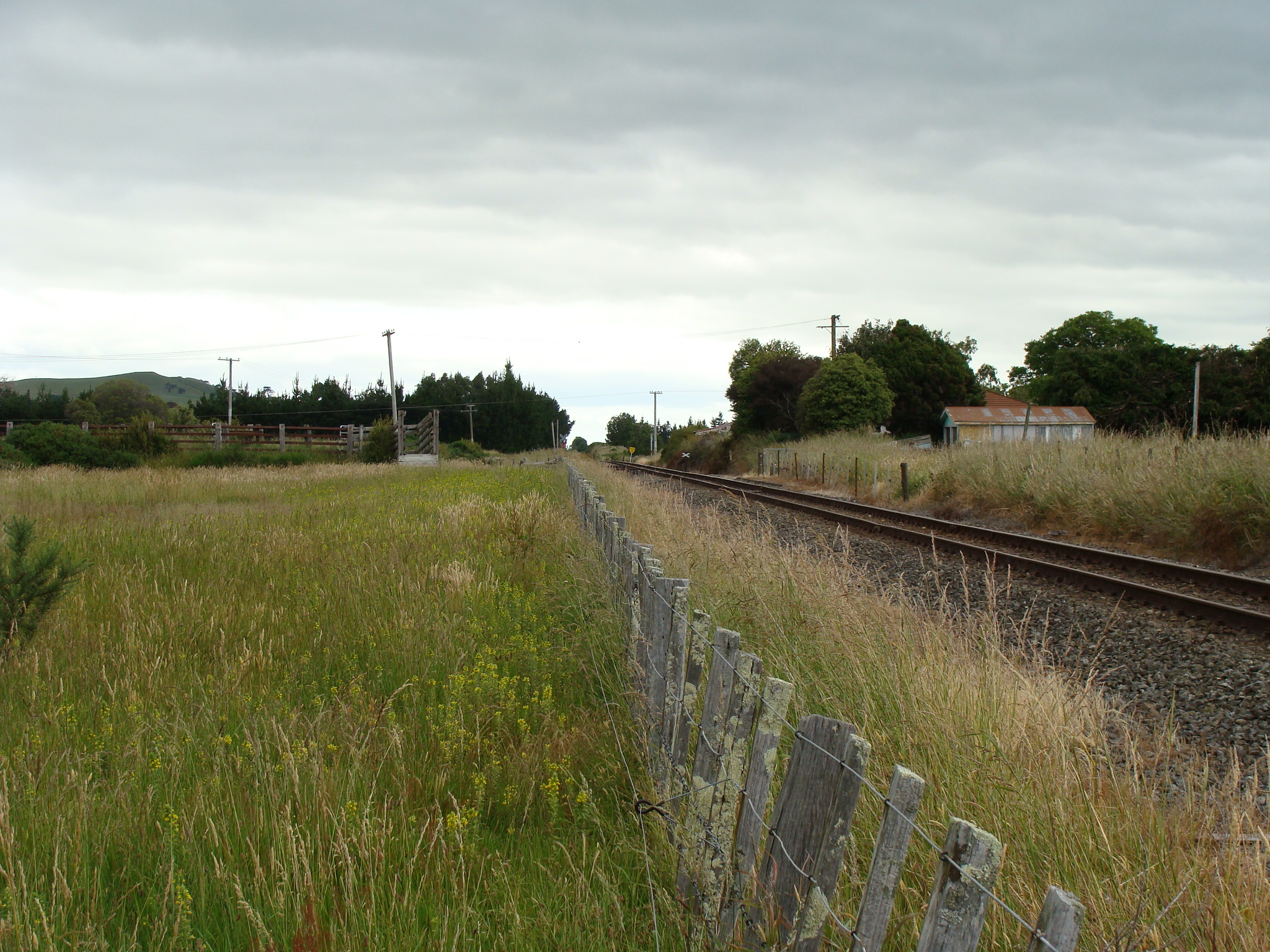
Location of former Kōpuaranga railway station;

Kōpuaranga locality had a population of 171 in the 2023 New Zealand census, an increase of 24 people (16.3%) since the 2018 census, and an increase of 30 people (21.3%) since the 2013 census. There were 90 males and 81 females in 63 dwellings. The median age was 41.3 years (compared with 38.1 years nationally). There were 36 people (21.1%) aged under 15 years, 21 (12.3%) aged 15 to 29, 78 (45.6%) aged 30 to 64, and 33 (19.3%) aged 65 or older.

People could identify as more than one ethnicity. The results were 94.7% European (Pākehā), 10.5% Māori, and 10.5% other, which includes people giving their ethnicity as "New Zealander". English was spoken by 96.5%, Māori by 3.5%, and other languages by 1.8%. No language could be spoken by 3.5% (e.g. too young to talk). New Zealand Sign Language was known by 1.8%. The percentage of people born overseas was 12.3, compared with 28.8% nationally.

Religious affiliations were 26.3% Christian. People who answered that they had no religion were 63.2%, and 8.8% of people did not answer the census question.

Of those at least 15 years old, 27 (20.0%) people had a bachelor's or higher degree, 87 (64.4%) had a post-high school certificate or diploma, and 21 (15.6%) people exclusively held high school qualifications. The median income was $36,200, compared with $41,500 nationally. 12 people (8.9%) earned over $100,000 compared to 12.1% nationally. The employment status of those at least 15 was 66 (48.9%) full-time and 24 (17.8%) part-time.

=== Kōpuaranga statistical area ===
Kōpuaranga statistical area, which also includes Mauriceville, covers 458.04 km^{2} (176.85 sq mi). It had an estimated population of 1,060 as of June 2025, with a population density of 2.3 people per km^{2}.

Historical population for the statistical area
Year	Pop.	±% p.a.
2006	771	—
2013	855	+1.49%
2018	915	+1.37%
2023	1,011	+2.02%

Kōpuaranga had a population of 1,011 in the 2023 New Zealand census, an increase of 96 people (10.5%) since the 2018 census, and an increase of 156 people (18.2%) since the 2013 census. There were 498 males, 510 females, and 3 people of other genders in 378 dwellings. 2.1% of people identified as LGBTIQ+. The median age was 45.3 years (compared with 38.1 years nationally). There were 201 people (19.9%) aged under 15 years, 123 (12.2%) aged 15 to 29, 495 (49.0%) aged 30 to 64, and 192 (19.0%) aged 65 or older.

People could identify as more than one ethnicity. The results were 93.5% European (Pākehā); 11.3% Māori; 2.1% Pasifika; 1.2% Asian; 0.3% Middle Eastern, Latin American and African New Zealanders (MELAA); and 4.2% other, which includes people giving their ethnicity as "New Zealander". English was spoken by 97.3%, Māori by 2.7%, and other languages by 5.0%. No language could be spoken by 2.4% (e.g. too young to talk). New Zealand Sign Language was known by 0.3%. The percentage of people born overseas was 16.0, compared with 28.8% nationally.

Religious affiliations were 28.2% Christian, 0.6% Māori religious beliefs, 0.3% Buddhist, 0.6% New Age, and 1.5% other religions. People who answered that they had no religion were 64.7%, and 5.0% of people did not answer the census question.

Of those at least 15 years old, 192 (23.7%) people had a bachelor's or higher degree, 453 (55.9%) had a post-high school certificate or diploma, and 168 (20.7%) people exclusively held high school qualifications. The median income was $44,400, compared with $41,500 nationally. 93 people (11.5%) earned over $100,000 compared to 12.1% nationally. The employment status of those at least 15 was 438 (54.1%) full-time, 150 (18.5%) part-time, and 15 (1.9%) unemployed.
