= 1906 Manukau by-election =

New Zealand by-election

- 6 December 1906
- Turnout: 3,797 (60.52%)
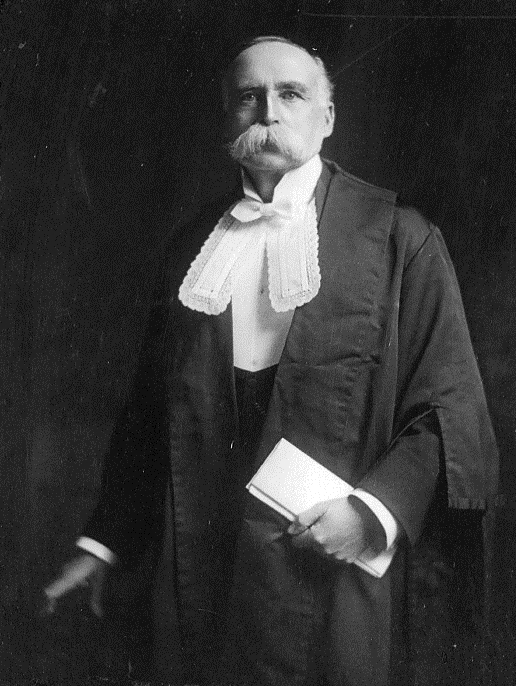

Candidate	Frederic Lang	George Ballard
Party	Conservative	Liberal
Popular vote	2,512	1,267
Percentage	66.15	33.36
Member before election
Matthew Kirkbride
Conservative
Elected Member
Frederic Lang
Conservative

The Manukau by-election was a by-election in the New Zealand electorate of Manukau, a seat in the north of the North Island.

== Background ==
The by-election was held on 6 December 1906, and was precipitated by the death of sitting MP Matthew Kirkbride who had held the seat since the 1902 election. The election was won by the conservative Frederic Lang who stood for the opposition. His sole opponent was George Ballard of the Liberal Party, who contested in the Government's interests.

== Result ==
The following table gives the election results:

1906 Manukau by-election
Party	Candidate	Votes	%	±%
Conservative	Frederic Lang	2,512	66.15	
Liberal	George Ballard	1,267	33.36	
Informal votes		18	0.47	−0.47
Majority		1,245	32.78	
Turnout		3,797	60.52	−25.28
Registered electors		6,273		
