= Thomas Forsyth (New Zealand politician) =

New Zealand politician

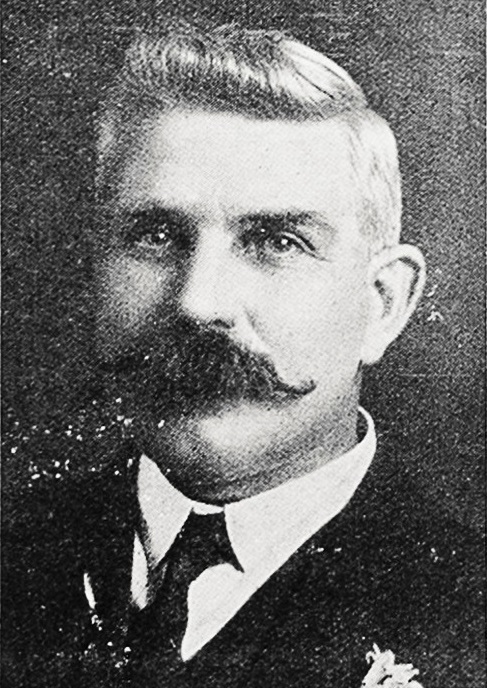
Forsyth in 1925

Thomas Forsyth (17 May 1868 – 6 February 1941) was a New Zealand politician who served as a Member of Parliament for Wellington East from 1925 to 1928. He was a member of the Reform Party.

== Early life ==
Forsyth was born in Dunedin in 1868. He was the third son of James Forsyth of Dunedin. He received his education at schools in Dunedin and attended the University of Otago. He was prominent in rugby and represented Otago and Wellington.

== Professional life ==
In 1884, Forsyth started to work for Dodgshun and Company, woollen importers. In 1891, when the head office transferred to Wellington, he moved to New Zealand's capital city. He was the manager of Dodgshun and Co. from 1894 to 1898. In 1898, he became the accountant and secretary for the Te Aro House Drapery Company Ltd. He became that company's assistant manager in 1905 and general manager in 1914, a position that he held until 1922, when he started his private accountancy practice.

== Public roles ==
New Zealand Parliament
Years	Term	Electorate	Party
1925–1928	22nd	Wellington East	Reform

Forsyth was a member of the Wellington Education Board for 18 years, and for 16 of those, he was its chairman. He held governance roles with the Technical College, Wellington College, and Victoria College.

Forsyth was first elected onto Wellington City Council in 1919 and had almost continuous membership until his death. The Civic League nominated him as their candidate for the 1925 mayoralty, but he withdrew in favour of Charles Norwood, who was the successful candidate.

Forsyth first stood in a general election in 1922, when he was one of four candidates in the Wellington East electorate. He came second, beaten by Labour's Alec Monteith. He won the Wellington East electorate in the 1925 general election by defeating Monteith. Forsyth was defeated in the next general election in 1928 by Labour's Bob Semple. He stood once more in 1931 but was again beaten by Semple.

In 1935, he was awarded the King George V Silver Jubilee Medal.

== Family and death ==
On 30 August 1894, Forsyth married Elizabeth Smith at Dunedin. She was the eldest daughter of Alexander Smith of Gracefield in County Londonderry, Ireland.

Elizabeth Forsyth died on 26 September 1935 at their Wellington home and was buried at Karori Cemetery in Wellington. Thomas Forsyth died at his son's house in Masterton on 6 February 1941. He is also buried at Karori Cemetery. He was survived by one son and three daughters.

== Notes ==
New Zealand Parliament
Preceded by Alec Monteith	Member of Parliament for Wellington East; 1925–1928	Succeeded by Bob Semple
