= Mauriceville, New Zealand =

Mauriceville
- Locality
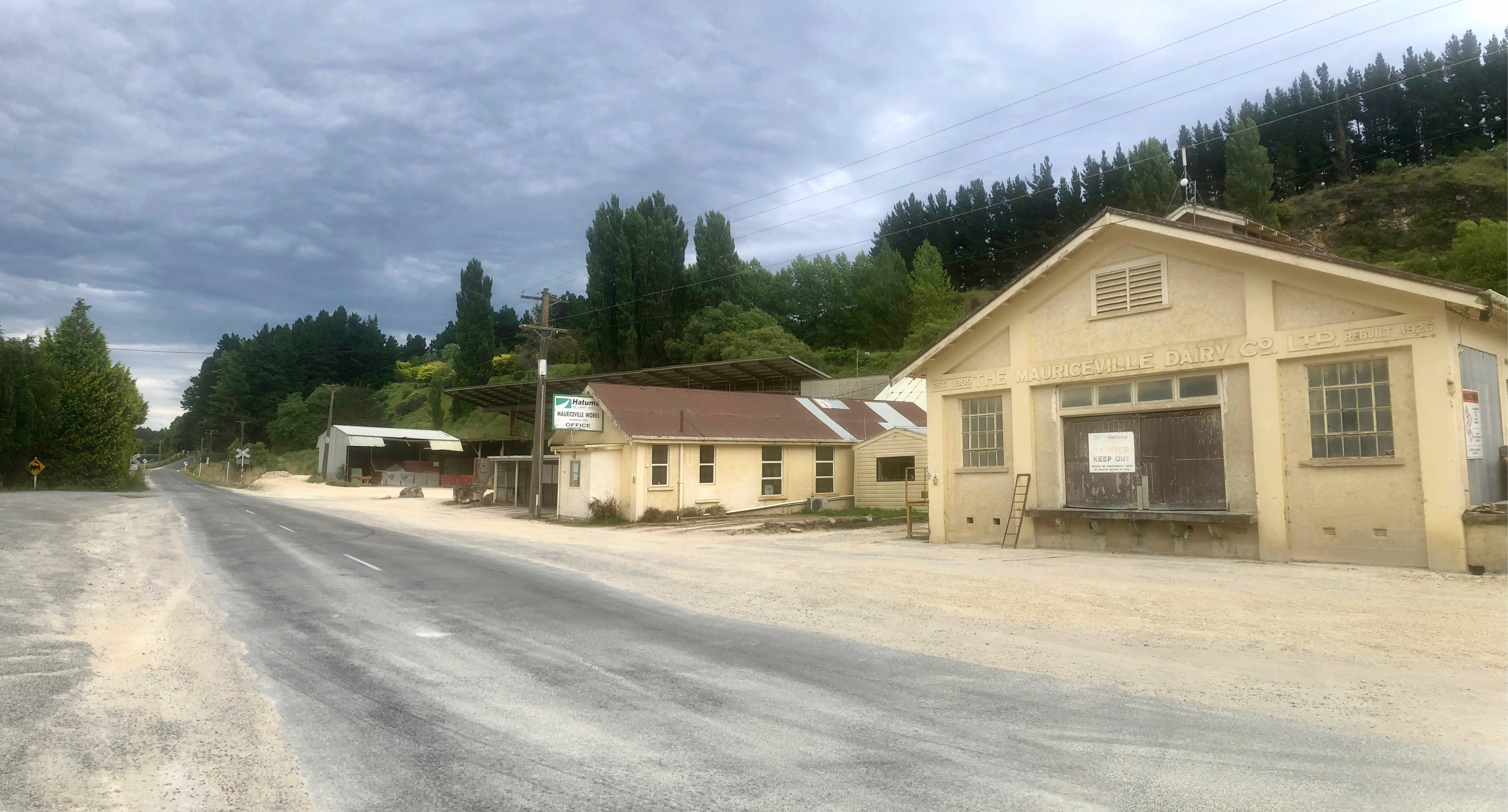
- Mauriceville Dairy and Hatuma lime works office
- Interactive map of Mauriceville
- Coordinates: 40.777°S 175.701°E
- Country: New Zealand
- Region: Wellington Region
- Territorial authority: Masterton District
- Electorates: Wairarapa; Ikaroa-Rāwhiti (Māori)

Government
  - Territorial Authority: Masterton District Council
  - Regional council: Greater Wellington Regional Council
  - Mayor of Masterton: Bex Johnson
  - Wairarapa MP: Mike Butterick
  - Ikaroa-Rāwhiti MP: Cushla Tangaere-Manuel

Area
  - Total: 44.75 km^{2} (17.28 sq mi)

Population (2023 census)
  - Total: 147
  - Density: 3.28/km^{2} (8.51/sq mi)

Mauriceville is a rural locality in the Masterton district, part of the Wairarapa region of New Zealand's North Island. The area is about half-way between Masterton and Eketāhuna, and is today split between Mauriceville East (on the Ōpaki-Kaiparoro Road) and Mauriceville West (nearer to Mount Bruce).

== History ==
Mauriceville was named after Maurice O'Rorke, a contemporary New Zealand politician who was Minister of Immigration and Crown Lands when the village was first founded, and was actually present when the site for the township was chosen.

The area was first settled in 1872, as the Scandinavian workers brought in to clear the Seventy-Mile Bush began to move north from Kōpuaranga, these workers were mostly mixed Danish, Norwegian and Swedish families, and were seen as Model Colonists. By 1897, the area's main industries were dairy farming and lime burning, and there were two schools, a railway station, two post/telegraph office, a Lutheran Church, several clubs and a public hall.

The distinctly Scandinavian character of the settlement can be seen through the names of the early inhabitants. The surnames present in the 1875 Wise's Directory entries for Mauriceville (then split into North, South and West) are Halburg, Hansen, Jorgensen, Larsen, Peterson, Thomsen, Ammundsen, Andersen, Anlin, Bosen, Christiansen, Ericsen, Jespersen, Jespersen, Larsen, Larsen, Neilsen, Olsen, Swenson, Allburg, Brodersen, Christensen, Christensen, Christian, Cullen, Dorset, Forgensen, Gundersen, Hansen, Jacobsen, Jensen, Larsen, Larsen, Larsen, Neilsen, Neilsen, Neilsen, Pedersen, Dobblestein, Jensen, Jensen, Jensen, Johannesen, Lauristen, Mortensen, Olsten, Pedersen, Pedersen and Roigaard, only a few of which are not of Scandinavian origin.

Like other Scandinavian townships of the Seventy-Mile Bush, such as Dannevirke, Norsewood, Eketāhuna and Kōpuaranga, this population soon diversified, and the Scandinavian settlers quickly assimilated into the Anglo-Saxon population, marrying the English and Scots settlers and fighting by their side in the World Wars. They were even considered by some to be more assimilated than New Zealanders of Southern Irish descent.

== Demographics ==
Mauriceville locality has an area of 44.75 km^{2} (17.28 sq mi) It is part of the larger Kōpuaranga statistical area.

Historical population
Year	Pop.	±% p.a.
2006	132	—
2013	129	−0.33%
2018	135	+0.91%
2023	147	+1.72%

Mauriceville had a population of 147 in the 2023 New Zealand census, an increase of 12 people (8.9%) since the 2018 census, and an increase of 18 people (14.0%) since the 2013 census. There were 72 males and 72 females in 57 dwellings. 2.0% of people identified as LGBTIQ+. The median age was 46.2 years (compared with 38.1 years nationally). There were 30 people (20.4%) aged under 15 years, 15 (10.2%) aged 15 to 29, 72 (49.0%) aged 30 to 64, and 30 (20.4%) aged 65 or older.

People could identify as more than one ethnicity. The results were 91.8% European (Pākehā), 14.3% Māori, 2.0% Asian, and 8.2% other, which includes people giving their ethnicity as "New Zealander". English was spoken by 95.9%, Māori by 4.1%, and other languages by 2.0%. No language could be spoken by 4.1% (e.g. too young to talk). The percentage of people born overseas was 12.2, compared with 28.8% nationally.

Religious affiliations were 20.4% Christian, 2.0% Māori religious beliefs, and 2.0% other religions. People who answered that they had no religion were 71.4%, and 6.1% of people did not answer the census question.

Of those at least 15 years old, 21 (17.9%) people had a bachelor's or higher degree, 60 (51.3%) had a post-high school certificate or diploma, and 39 (33.3%) people exclusively held high school qualifications. The median income was $30,900, compared with $41,500 nationally. 9 people (7.7%) earned over $100,000 compared to 12.1% nationally. The employment status of those at least 15 was 54 (46.2%) full-time, 21 (17.9%) part-time, and 3 (2.6%) unemployed.

== Education ==
Mauriceville School is a co-educational state primary school for Year 1 to 8 students, with a roll of 10 as of July 2026. It opened in 1889 and has sometimes been called Mauriceville East. It was preceded by Mauriceville Railway School (1887 to 1888). Mauriceville West School opened in 1878 and closed in 1972. There were once five primary schools in Mauriceville.

== See also ==
- Mauriceville railway station
