= Woolf Fisher =

New Zealand businessman and philanthropist; co-founder of Fisher & Paykel

Sir Woolf Fisher
- Born: 20 May 1912; Wellington, New Zealand
- Died: 12 January 1975 (aged 62); Rotorua, New Zealand
- Education: Mount Albert Grammar School
- Occupations: Businessman, racehorse owner/breeder, philanthropist
- Known for: Co-founder of Fisher and Paykel
- Board member of: Fisher & Paykel, New Zealand Steel Ltd., Auckland Racing Club, New Zealand Insurance Co.
- Spouse: Joyce Paykel
- Parent(s): Michael Fisher; Fanny Dabscheck

Sir Woolf Fisher (20 May 1912 – 12 January 1975) was a New Zealand businessman and philanthropist, who along with Maurice Paykel co-founded Fisher & Paykel, a major appliance manufacturing company. He also established the Ra Ora Stud, an important Thoroughbred racehorse breeding operation.

== Biography ==
Fisher was born in Wellington, New Zealand. His family moved to Auckland, where he studied at Mount Albert Grammar School. His father, Michael, was a Jewish immigrant from Shumsk in Ukraine (then Russia) via London. His mother, Fanny, was the daughter of Russian Jews who had immigrated to Australia. His younger brother was renowned fashion entrepreneur and philanthropist, Gus Fisher.

A salesman turned businessman, Fisher was involved in a number of successful New Zealand enterprises. He served as the first chairman of New Zealand Steel. In 1960, he established the Woolf Fisher Trust to provide funding that maintained the salaries of post-primary schoolteachers and principals while sending them overseas to further their education. Fisher also supported the Outward Bound Trust of New Zealand and in 1961 became its first president.

In the 1964 New Year Honours, Fisher was appointed a Knight Bachelor for public services, particularly in connection with the development of industry. He died in 1975 while at his bach on the lake at Rotorua. In 1994, Fisher was an inaugural inductee into the New Zealand Business Hall of Fame.

== Thoroughbred racing ==
A polo enthusiast who was responsible for the revival of the Auckland Polo Club in 1955, Fisher became a major figure in the sport of Thoroughbred racing. In 1950 he established Ra Ora Stud at Mount Wellington whose success led to new facilities being constructed in 1962 on 71.6 hectares at East Tamaki, just out of Auckland. The breeding farm stood important stallions such as Sovereign Edition (Ire), Soviet Star (USA), Nassipour (USA), Desert Sun (GB), and Marju among others. Ra Ora Stud continued in operation after Fisher's death in 1975. Run by a Board of Trustees for his estate, it closed in 2001 and its bloodstock sold at auction.

Fisher served on the Board of Directors of the Auckland Racing Club for 17 years, with two years as its president.
