= Fisher & Paykel =

New Zealand-based appliance marketer

Fisher & Paykel Appliances Holdings Limited
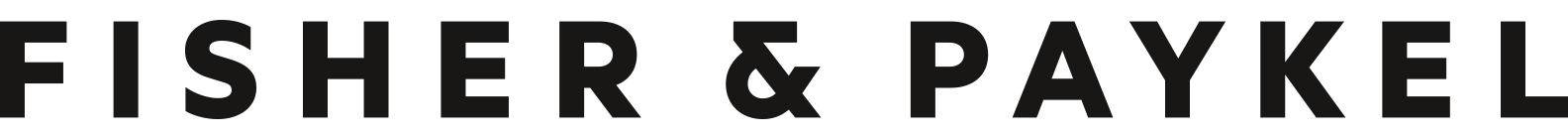
- Type: Subsidiary
- Industry: Major appliance
- Founded: 1934; 92 years ago
- Founder: Sir Woolf Fisher; Maurice Paykel
- Headquarters: East Tāmaki, Auckland, New Zealand
- Area served: New Zealand; Australia; United States; Canada; Italy; Lebanon; Hong Kong; United Kingdom
- Key people: Daniel Witten-Hannah (CEO); Liang Haishan (chairman)
- Products: Major appliances
- Revenue: ▼NZ$1.029 billion (2010).
- Operating income: ▼NZ$29.419 million (2010)
- Net income: ▼NZ$17.95 million (2010)
- Number of employees: 4000+
- Parent: Haier
- Website: www.fisherpaykel.com/

Fisher & Paykel Appliances Holdings Limited (/ˈpaɪkəl/) is a major appliance marketer and designer. The company was founded in 1934 and is based in Auckland, New Zealand.

Originally an importer of domestic refrigerators, Fisher & Paykel now holds over 420 patents and bases its identity on innovative design, particularly in the areas of usability and environmental awareness.

The company's trademarked appliances include Active Smart refrigerators, AeroTech ovens, DishDrawer dishwashers, Smart Drive washing machines and Smartload top loading dryers. The company also manufactures gas and electric cooktops.

In 2004, Fisher & Paykel Appliances purchased the United States–based cookware manufacturer Dynamic Cooking Systems, and Italian cookware company Elba in 2006.

Fisher & Paykel has grown into a global company operating in 50 countries and manufacturing in Thailand, China, Italy and Mexico. The company had a manufacturing base in Australia for almost 20 years and nearly 70 years in New Zealand, but stated it can no longer compete with low cost labour countries and had to close them.

In 2012, Haier purchased over 90% of Fisher & Paykel Appliance shares. No changes in manufacturing or board of directors were made.

== History ==
Fisher & Paykel Appliances Ltd was listed publicly in 2001, following the separation of Fisher & Paykel Industries Ltd into Fisher & Paykel Healthcare Ltd and Fisher & Paykel Appliances Ltd that same year.

=== Fisher & Paykel Industries ===
Fisher & Paykel Industries Ltd was founded in 1934 in New Zealand by Sir Woolf Fisher and Maurice Paykel. The company publicly listed in 1979 with authorised capital of NZ$ 40 million.

Initially the company was an importer of Crosley appliances, Maytag and Pilot products; in 1938 the company began manufacturing Kelvinator washing machines under license. This followed the introduction of tariffs by the First Labour Government of New Zealand.

In 1956, manufacturing was moved to a purpose-built factory in Mount Wellington, Auckland. This facility included flexible machinery manufacturing techniques developed in tandem with the raw material suppliers, enabling Fisher & Paykel Industries to greatly increase production.

In 1955, Fisher and Paykel acquired Dunedin electric oven manufacturer H. E. Shacklock Ltd, which dominated the New Zealand domestic appliance market through the era of Government protectionism. Subsequently, the Shacklock brand was gradually withdrawn from the Fisher and Paykel product range.

The company began exporting within Australasia and East Asia around 1968. At that time the company also manufactured cabinets, sparkplugs and televisions.

During the 1980s, the company became more focused on research and development, resulting in the development of the ECS direct drive mechanism washing machine affectionately known as 'Gentle Annie' and highly automated production lines. In 1989, the company opened its first overseas manufacturing facility in Cleveland, Australia.

The company entered the European market in 1992, and by 1994 was exporting to over 80 countries.

=== Fisher & Paykel Appliances ===
On 12 November 2001, Fisher & Paykel Industries split into Fisher & Paykel Appliances Holdings Ltd and Fisher & Paykel Healthcare Corporation Ltd.

In October 2004, Fisher & Paykel Appliances acquired Dynamic Cooking Systems Inc, a United States manufacturer and distributor of cooking appliances. Dynamic Cooking Systems was acquired for US$33 million (NZ$49.3 million) in a debt-free state, allowing the company to leverage market presence while maintaining its quality of engineering.

In June 2006, the Italian cookware business Elba was acquired from DeLonghi for €78 million (NZ$158 million). Elba has been since renamed as Fisher & Paykel Appliances Italy S.p.A. and exports to over 54 countries, focusing on the UK market.

Fisher & Paykel makes a relatively broad range of mid to high end dishwashers. Its notable drawcard to the Fisher & Paykel brand is the DishDrawer dishwasher. Most dishwasher brands don't offer drawer-style dishwashers, so Fisher & Paykel is the leader for this niche design. In 2018, Australian customers gave Fisher & Paykel 4 out of 5 stars for overall customer satisfaction for dishwashers.

== Current products ==
Fisher & Paykel Appliances currently manufactures cooking, laundry and whiteware appliances. The company's flagship product is the DishDrawer double drawer dishwasher which it claims washes dishes more efficiently than standard dishwashers or hand washing.

The current Fisher & Paykel-branded product range includes built-in ovens, electric cooktops, dishwashers, dryers, freezers, ranges, rangehoods, refrigerators and washing machines.

A large number of Fisher & Paykel products utilise microprocessor and brushless DC electric motor technology from production line equipment to improve efficiency.

The company's trademarked brushless motor-based performance features include Smart Drive washing machines, SmartLoad Dryers and DishDrawer dishwashers. Microprocessor-based control systems form the basis of Active Smart refrigerators and AeroTech ovens.
