= Frederic Lang =

New Zealand politician (1852–1937)

The Honourable Sir Frederic Lang
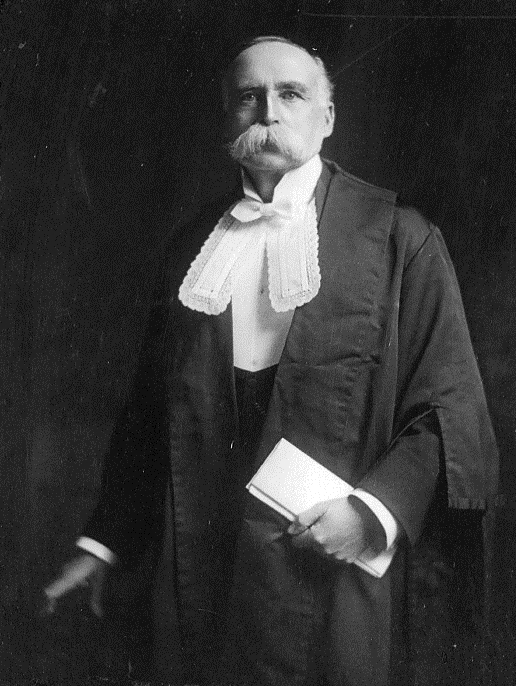

8th Speaker of the House of Representatives
- In office 26 June 1913 – 31 October 1922
- Prime Minister: William Massey
- Preceded by: Arthur Guinness
- Succeeded by: Charles Statham

Member of the New Zealand Parliament for Manukau
- In office 6 December 1906 – 7 December 1922
- Preceded by: Matthew Kirkbride
- Succeeded by: Bill Jordan

Member of the New Zealand Parliament for Waikato
- In office 4 December 1896 – 6 December 1905
- Preceded by: Alfred Cadman
- Succeeded by: Henry Greenslade

Member of the New Zealand Parliament for Waipa
- In office 28 November 1893 – 4 December 1896
- Preceded by: In abeyance
- Succeeded by: In abeyance

Personal details
- Born: Frederic William Lang; 1852 Blackheath, Kent, England
- Died: 5 March 1937 (aged 84–85) Onehunga, New Zealand
- Party: Reform
- Occupation: Farmer

Sir Frederic William Lang (1852 – 5 March 1937) was a New Zealand politician, from 1909 a member of the Reform Party, he was the eighth Speaker of the House of Representatives, from 1913 to 1922.

== Early life ==
Lang was born in Blackheath, Kent, England, in 1852. He was the youngest of six children born to Oliver William Lang and Louisa Lang (née Briggs). His father, a Master Shipwright of HM Dockyard, Chatham and Lieutenant colonel of the Royal Dockyard Brigade, died in 1868 and his mother also died in 1869. In 1872 Lang emigrated to New Zealand, aged 19, and settled as a farmer in Tuhikaramea close to the Waipā River.

In 1878 and again in 1880-82 Lang played for the Waikato District rugby team as a forward along with playing for a Civilians side, Ngahinepouri, Ōhaupō, Te Awamutu and Waipā teams. He played cricket and was captain of the Ngahinepouri side, played for Alexandra and was a member of the Waikato Cricket Association. He played football and represented the Auckland Province in 1880.

Around 1906, he sold his farm and moved north to Onehunga. He never married.

== Political career ==
New Zealand Parliament
Years	Term	Electorate	Party
1893–1896	12th	Waipa	Conservative
1896–1899	13th	Waikato	Conservative
1899–1902	14th	Waikato	Conservative
1902–1905	15th	Waikato	Conservative
1906–1908	16th	Manukau	Conservative
1908–1911	17th	Manukau	Conservative
1911–1914	18th	Manukau	Reform
1914–1919	19th	Manukau	Reform
1919–1922	20th	Manukau	Reform

Lang's political career started with his election to the Tuhikaramea Road Board. He was elected onto the Waipa County and became its chairman for six years. He also belonged to the Waikato Charitable Aid Board.

He was the Member of Parliament for Waipa from 1893 to 1896; then Waikato from 1896 to 1905 when he was defeated; then Manukau from 6 December 1906 until 1922, when he was defeated. He was Chairman of Committees from 1912 to 1913. He then became Speaker of the House of Representatives from 1913 to 1922.

In 1913 as speaker, in response to filibusting by Āpirana Ngata, Lang introduced a rule that MPs who could speak in English must not speak te reo Māori and by 1920 Parliament no longer employed translators. The situation was reversed in the 1980s with the Māori Renaissance and the Maori Language Act 1987.

He was knighted in 1916. He was appointed to the Legislative Council in 1924 and served for one term until 1931. In 1935, he was awarded the King George V Silver Jubilee Medal.

== Death ==
He died at his home in Onehunga on 5 March 1937.

== Notes ==
Political offices
Preceded by James Colvin	Chairman of Committees of the House of Representatives; 1912–1913	Succeeded by Alexander Malcolm
Preceded by Arthur Guinness	Speaker of the New Zealand House of Representatives; 1913–1922	Succeeded by Charles Statham
New Zealand Parliament
Vacant Constituency recreated after abolition in 1890 Title last held by John Bryce	Member of Parliament for Waipa; 1893–1896	Vacant Constituency abolished, recreated in 1954 Title next held by Stan Goosman
Preceded by Alfred Cadman	Member of Parliament for Waikato; 1896–1905	Succeeded by Henry Greenslade
Preceded by Matthew Kirkbride	Member of Parliament for Manukau; 1906–1922	Succeeded by Bill Jordan
