= Arthur Osborne (politician) =

New Zealand politician

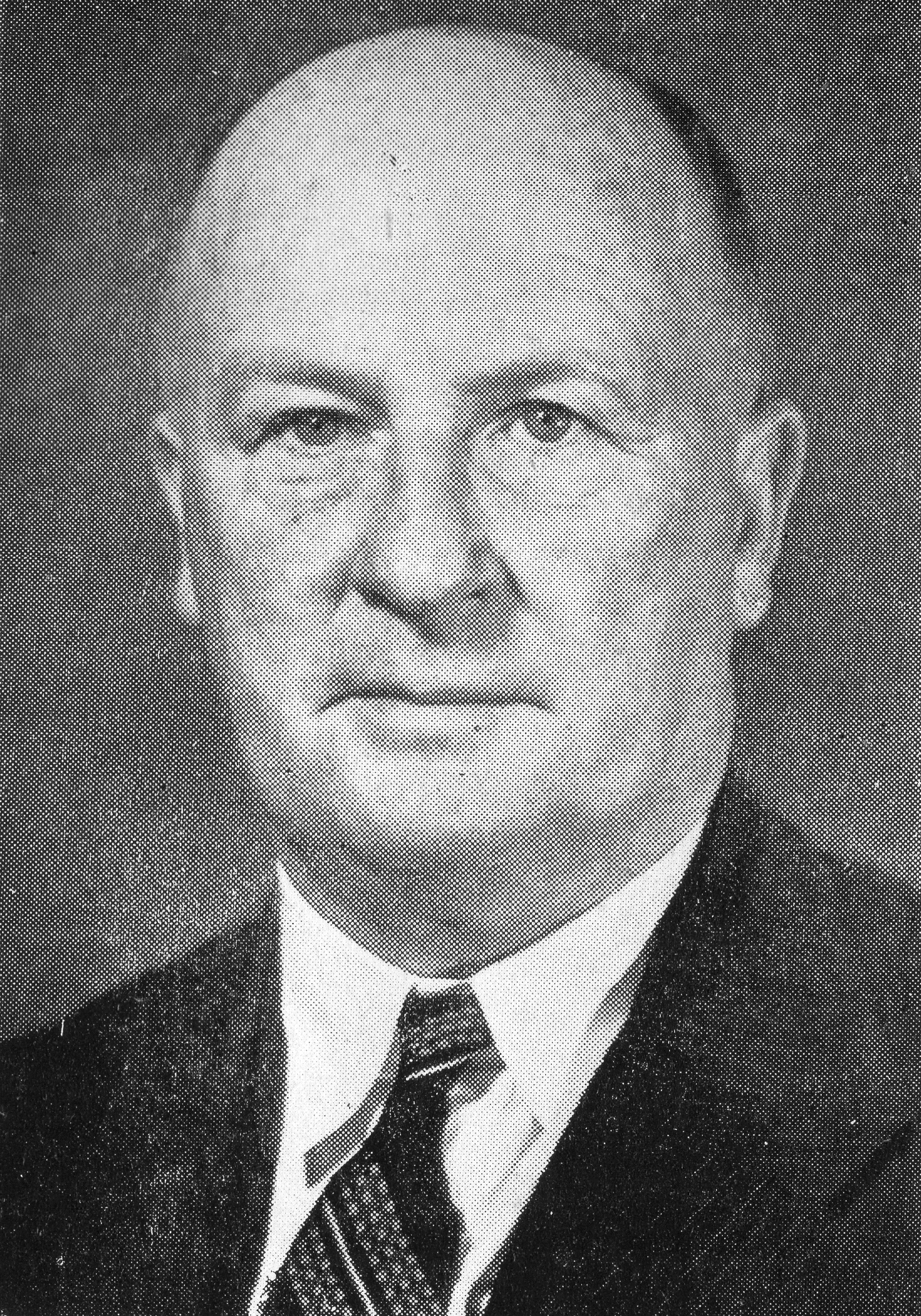

Member of the New Zealand Parliament for Onehunga
- In office 15 October 1938 – 15 November 1953
- Preceded by: New constituency
- Succeeded by: Hugh Watt

Member of the New Zealand Parliament for Manukau
- In office 30 September 1936 – 15 October 1938
- Preceded by: Bill Jordan
- Succeeded by: seat abolished

Personal details
- Born: 14 March 1891 Christchurch, New Zealand
- Died: 15 November 1953 (aged 62) Auckland, New Zealand
- Party: Labour

Arthur George Osborne (14 March 1891 – 15 November 1953) was a New Zealand politician of the Labour Party.

== Biography ==
=== Early life and career ===
Osborne was born in Christchurch in 1891. He lived most of his life in Northcote on the North Shore of Auckland. He first found employment as a boot maker before entering the fruit business.

He was a prominent member of the Ancient Order of Foresters and held the highest office in the order, that of High District Chief Ranger. He likewise became a member of various local school committees.

In his youth he was a keen athlete. He played rugby union, rugby league and soccer at competitive levels. He was later a representative member of the Waitemata Bowling Club, and won several trophies.

=== Political career ===
New Zealand Parliament
Years	Term	Electorate	Party
1936–1938	25th	Manukau	Labour
1938–1943	26th	Onehunga	Labour
1943–1946	27th	Onehunga	Labour
1946–1949	28th	Onehunga	Labour
1949–1951	29th	Onehunga	Labour
1951–1953	30th	Onehunga	Labour

In the 1925, 1928, and 1931 elections, he unsuccessfully contested the Waitemata electorate against the incumbent, Alexander Harris. In the 1935 election, he unsuccessfully contested the Parnell electorate against the incumbent, Bill Endean of the Reform Party.

From 1933 to 1936 he was a member of the Northcote Borough Council. He resigned upon his election to Parliament.

He represented the Manukau electorate from a 1936 by-election (after the resignation of Bill Jordan) to 1938, and then the Onehunga electorate from 1938 to 1953, when he died. He was succeeded in Onehunga by Hugh Watt.

Osborne was Parliamentary Under-Secretary to the Prime Minister from 1943 to 1949. As Under-Secretary he was given responsibilities for the administration of New Zealand's island territories. In 1948 he represented New Zealand at the second session of the Cook Islands Legislative Council, initiating discussions with the island administration on issues of agricultural development, public health and education, leading to their improvement.

In 1953, Osborne was awarded the Queen Elizabeth II Coronation Medal.

=== Death ===
In early November 1953, Osborne announced he was not seeking re-election and would retire at the 1954 general election due to ill health. His health had declined through the year and he spent most of October and November confined to his bed. Osborne died at his home in Onehunga on 15 November 1953 after a long illness, aged 62. He was survived by his wife, son, daughter and four grandchildren. One son, Gordon Bert Osborne, had predeceased him; he was killed in action at Tobruk during World War II.

== Notes ==
New Zealand Parliament
Preceded by Bill Jordan	Member of Parliament for Manukau; 1936–1938	Vacant Constituency abolished, recreated in 1954 Title next held by Leon Götz
Vacant Constituency abolished in 1881 Title last held by Maurice O'Rorke	Member of Parliament for Onehunga; 1938–1953	Succeeded by Hugh Watt
