= Auckland Polo Club =

Polo club in Auckland, New Zealand (founded in 1888)

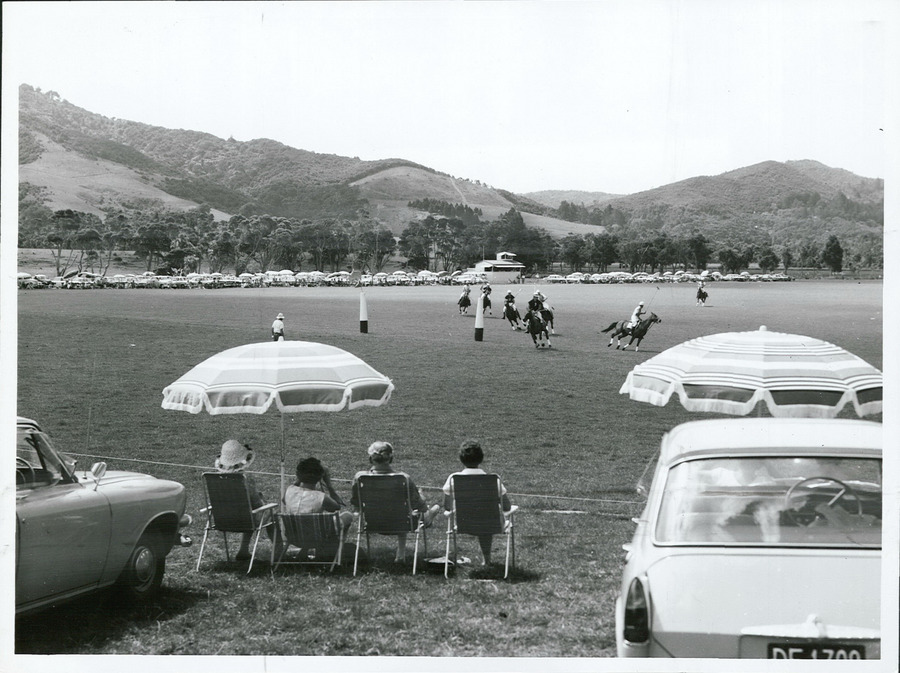
Auckland Polo Club. Polo at Clevedon.

The Auckland Polo Club is a historic polo club in Auckland, New Zealand. Founded in 1888, it hosts many national and international tournaments, including the annual BMW Polo Open.

== Location ==
It is located in Clevedon, a suburb of Auckland, New Zealand. The Wairoa River flows nearby.

== History ==
It was founded in 1888, making it the oldest club in New Zealand. It is affiliated with the New Zealand Polo Association. It is a reciprocal club with the Guards Polo Club in England. There are five polo grounds.

Sir Maurice O'Rorke, who served as the fifth Speaker of the New Zealand House of Representatives from 1879 to 1890, was the Captain of the club. Other early players included Thomas Morrin, Major Geoffrey Buddle, E.C. Meysey-Thompson, T.C. Williamson, and T. O'Sullivan.

The club has 200 members, 61 of which are polo players. They won the New Zealand Savile Cup in 1976, 1977, 1982, 1986, 1987, 1990 and 1993. Every year from October to March, the club organises four matches a week. It also hosts the annual BMW Polo Open Tournament.

The club president is Tony van den Brink.
