= Bill Jordan (politician) =

New Zealand politician (1879–1959)

The Right Honourable Sir William Jordan KCMG PC
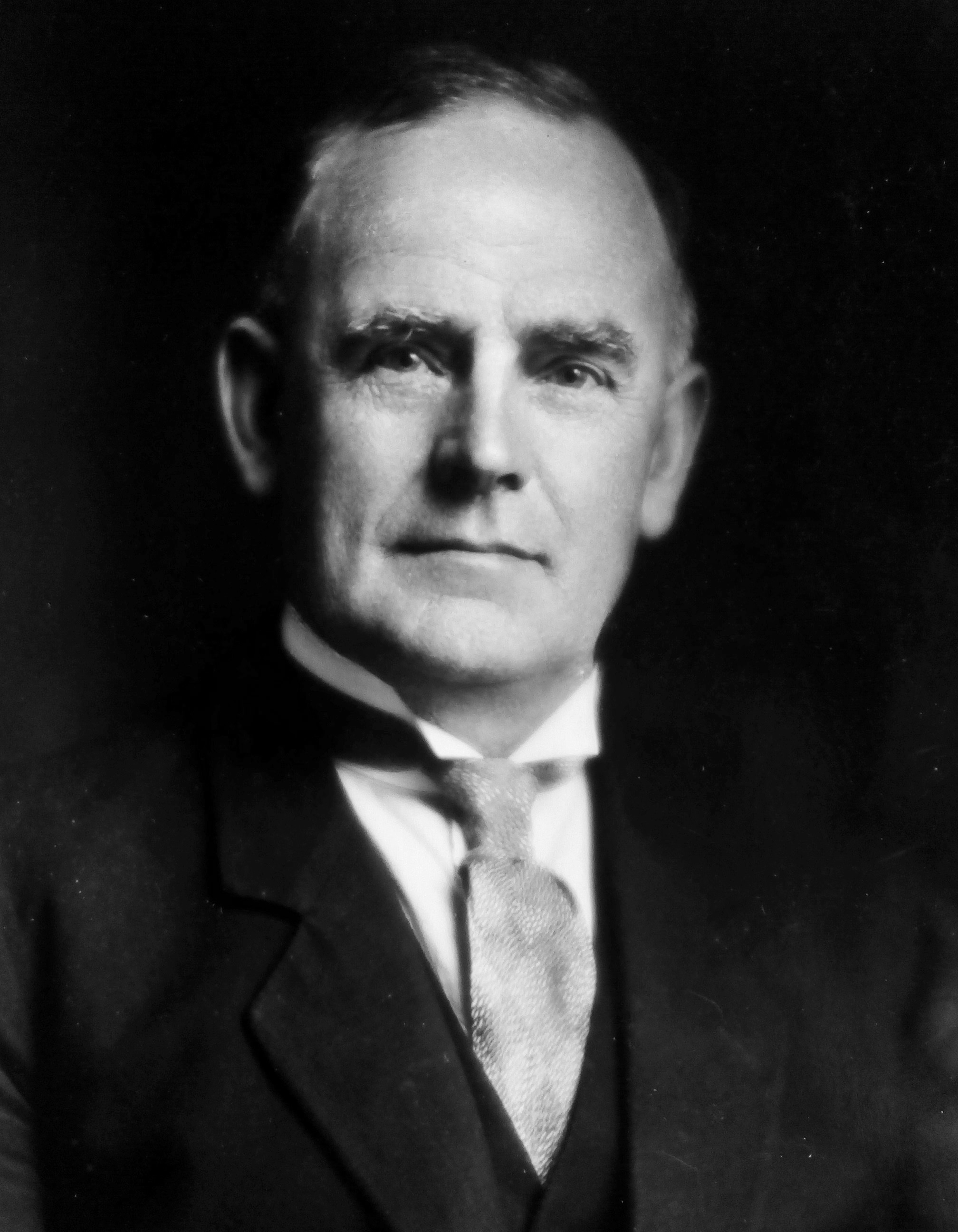
- Jordan in 1935

7th High Commissioner from New Zealand to the United Kingdom
- In office 1 September 1936 – 31 August 1951
- Preceded by: James Parr
- Succeeded by: Frederick Doidge

11th President of the Labour Party
- In office 29 March 1932 – 18 April 1933
- Vice President: William Atkinson
- Preceded by: Rex Mason
- Succeeded by: Frank Langstone

Member of the New Zealand Parliament for Manukau
- In office 7 December 1922 – 1 September 1936
- Preceded by: Frederic Lang
- Succeeded by: Arthur Osborne

Personal details
- Born: William Joseph Jordan; 9 May 1879 Ramsgate, Kent, England
- Died: 8 April 1959 (aged 79) Auckland, New Zealand
- Party: Labour Party
- Spouse(s): Winifred Amy Bycroft m 1916 (d 1950); Elizabeth Ross Reid m 1952
- Children: William Jordan, barrister Gwen Douglas psychiatrist

Military service
- Allegiance: New Zealand Army
- Rank: Warrant officer
- Battles/wars: World War I

Sir William Joseph Jordan KCMG PC (19 May 1879 – 8 April 1959) was a New Zealand Labour Party member of Parliament, and New Zealand's longest-serving high commissioner to the United Kingdom from 1936 to 1951.

== Early life ==
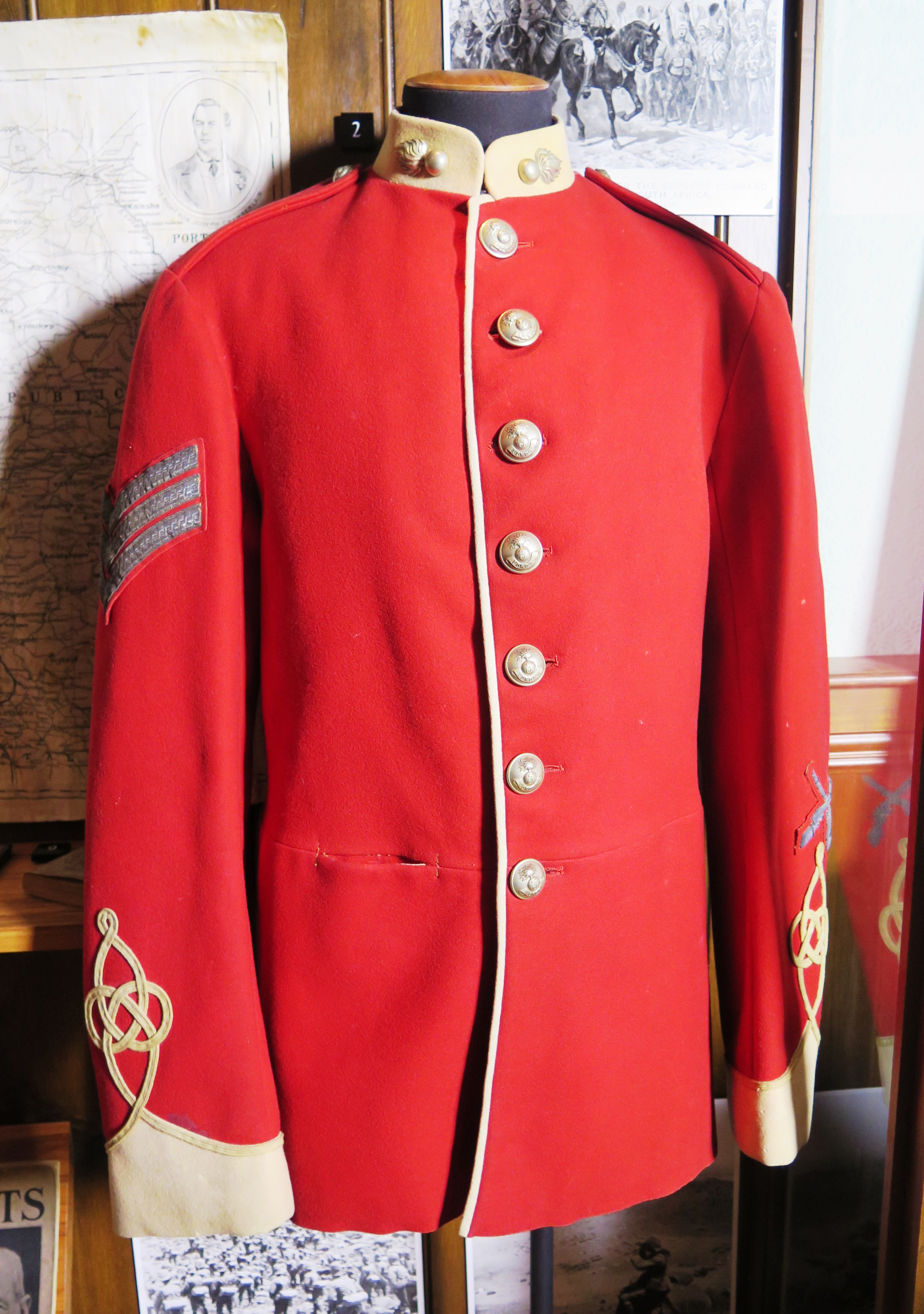
Jordan's 3rd (City of London) Rifle Volunteers tunic

Jordan was born in Ramsgate, Kent, the son and grandson of fishing boat captains. His father William Joseph Jordan was a member of the lifeboat crew that earned fame and exploits on the Goodwin Sands. His mother was Elizabeth Ann Catt. He attended St George's Church of England Boys' School in Ramsgate, later becoming president of the Old Boys' Association. The decline of the local fishing industry forced the Jordan family to move to London. William then attended St Luke's Parochial School, Old Street in London and wore the characteristic old-fashioned uniform which was well known. Aged 12 he left school (1892) and became an apprentice coach painter, from which he resigned on account of the scourge of lead poisoning. He then entered the postal service in 1896 and reached a responsible position at Mount Pleasant (headquarters of the Postal Service). While there, he showed his preference in politics by joining the Fawcett Association. Jordan later joined the London Metropolitan Police and underwent training at Scotland Yard, afterwards being stationed at Limehouse in East End of London. He was also a member of the part-time 3rd London Rifle Volunteer Corps, rising to the rank of sergeant.

Jordan emigrated to New Zealand in 1904, initially working as a labourer in Manawatu, Nelson and Wellington and went bush farming. He joined the Labour Party in 1907, as the first secretary of the Wellington branch of the party. In 1911 he unsuccessfully stood for the Wellington City Council on a Labour Party ticket, as he did in the 1919 election in the Raglan constituency. He was then living in Ngāruawāhia, where he married Winifred Amy Bycroft in 1916. Her grandfather, John Bycroft, established the first flour mill in Auckland, now a part of Howick Historical Village. She died, aged 56, in 1950 at the Royal Masonic Hospital after a long illness. They had a son, William, who was a lawyer, and a daughter, Gwen Douglas, a psychiatrist, born on 4 October 1920 in Papatoetoe. In 1952 he married Elizabeth Ross Reid, the widow of a Te Awamutu farmer.

== First World War ==
Unlike many other early Labour Party leaders, e.g. Harry Holland, Michael Joseph Savage and Peter Fraser, Jordan was not a conscientious objector. He enlisted in the First New Zealand Expeditionary Force in France in 1917. In March 1918, Jordan saw action for the first time, and suffered serious wounds in action two weeks later. He transferred to the Army Education Service, where he served as an instructor on beekeeping until the end of the war, returning to New Zealand in 1919.

== Parliamentary career ==
New Zealand Parliament
Years	Term	Electorate	Party
1922–1925	21st	Manukau	Labour
1925–1928	22nd	Manukau	Labour
1928–1931	23rd	Manukau	Labour
1931–1935	24th	Manukau	Labour
1935–1936	25th	Manukau	Labour

In 1922, Jordan was surprisingly elected as one of 17 Labour Party MPs, winning the seat of Manukau increasing his majority at each of the four subsequent elections, until he had one of the largest votes and majorities. Jordan had an earlier unsuccessful attempt to win the Raglan seat for Labour in the 1919 general election.

In early 1935 the Jordan affair pitted Jordan against the Auckland Labour Representation Committee when he proposed to stand for the Auckland Electric Power Board as an independent when the LRC decided not to nominate an official Labour candidate, but he was supported by Labour leader Michael Joseph Savage.

He was the Labour Party's senior whip from December 1935 until he resigned in June 1936.

Jordan was a diligent local MP, and held his seat until Labour won the government benches in 1935. Jordan had expected to be elevated to cabinet; instead he was appointed to the post of New Zealand High Commissioner to London, which had until that point been traditionally a retirement post for former cabinet ministers; Labour being first elected to power in 1935 had no MPs with previous cabinet experience.

== Sporting involvement ==
Jordan was also involved in sports. He was the patron of the Ellerslie Rugby League Club from 1933 to 1935.

== New Zealand High Commissioner to London ==
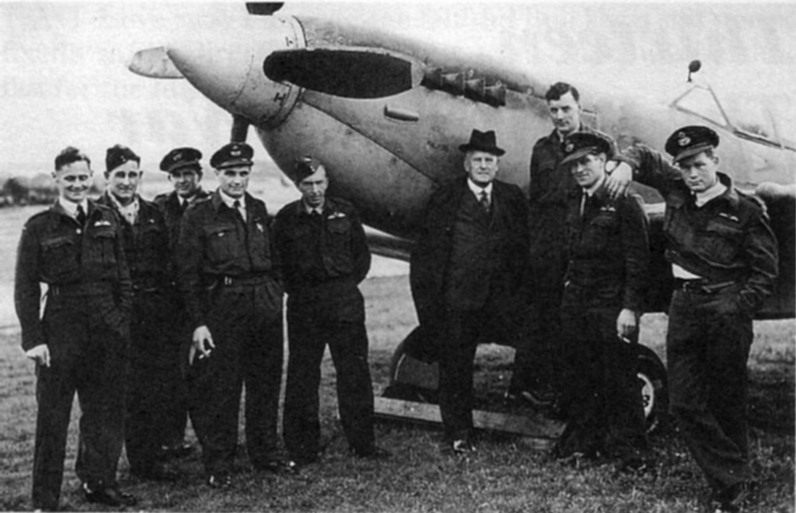
Pilots of No. 485 Squadron RNZAF with NZ High Commissioner Bill Jordan c. 1944

Jordan served as New Zealand's high commissioner to London from September 1936 to 1951. Until 1941, London was New Zealand's only diplomatic posting, and Jordan became prominent as New Zealand's official representative overseas. Jordan was actively involved as New Zealand's representative to the League of Nations. Jordan served as president of the League of Nations in 1938. While Europe was heading towards war, Jordan's public position was that war was inconceivable. In 1938 Jordan wrote to Prime Minister Savage, stating that "we shall not see war involving our Empire in our lifetime". Just before war broke out he spoke in similar terms in a broadcast to New Zealand. As he said six months later, right up to that date, "I could not believe that the world was so mad as to go to war." During his time on the League of Nations, he suggested in 1937 that the organisation should intervene on Spain during the Spanish Civil War and then hold free and fair elections on the country, but the proposal has fallen on deaf ears within the organisation.

Jordan was highly regarded during the war for his loyalty to New Zealand servicemen and women, and his care for soldiers.

Jordan's reputation among officials and cabinet colleagues was much less warm. He frequently refused instructions from Wellington on the basis that remote officials at home could not accurately assess New Zealand's position. Jordan was loathed by his deputies, Major General W. G. Stevens and Dick Campbell. Secretary of External Affairs Alister McIntosh had frequent difficulties with Jordan. Deputy Prime Minister Walter Nash had feuds with Jordan, stemming from Nash's position representing the Prime Minister at international gatherings that Jordan felt was his own right to represent.

Despite this, Jordan remained a popular figure among the public in New Zealand. In 1949, with the Labour Party defeated from office, the incoming National Government decided to retain Jordan in his post, until 1951. He was appointed a Knight Commander of the Order of St Michael and St George in the 1952 Queen's Birthday Honours, and the following year he was awarded the Queen Elizabeth II Coronation Medal.He was a Christian Socialist and Methodist home missionary. He died in Auckland on 8 April 1959.

== Awards ==
- Knight Commander of the Order of St Michael and St George (KCMG)
- Honorary doctorates from Cambridge University and St Andrews University
- Privy Councillor
- Freedoms of the cities of London and Ramsgate.

== Notes ==
New Zealand Parliament
Preceded by Frederic Lang	Member of Parliament for Manukau; 1922–1936	Succeeded by Arthur Osborne
Party political offices
Preceded by Rex Mason	President of the Labour Party; 1932–1933	Succeeded by Frank Langstone
Preceded by Dan Sullivan	Senior Whip of the Labour Party; 1935–1936	Succeeded by Robert McKeen
Diplomatic posts
Preceded by James Parr	High Commissioner to the United Kingdom; 1936–1951	Succeeded by Frederick Doidge
