= Manukau (electorate) =

Manukau is a former New Zealand parliamentary electorate in the south Auckland Region. It existed from 1881 to 1978, with a break from 1938 to 1954. It was represented by nine Members of Parliament. Two by-elections were held in the electorate.

== Population centres ==
The previous electoral redistribution was undertaken in 1875 for the 1875–1876 election. In the six years since, New Zealand's European population had increased by 65%. In the 1881 electoral redistribution, the House of Representatives increased the number of European representatives to 91 (up from 84 since the 1875–76 election). The number of Māori electorates was held at four. The House further decided that electorates should not have more than one representative, which led to 35 new electorates being formed, including Manukau, and two electorates that had previously been abolished to be recreated. This necessitated a major disruption to existing boundaries.

The First Labour Government was defeated in the 1949 election and the incoming National Government changed the Electoral Act, with the electoral quota once again based on total population as opposed to qualified electors, and the tolerance was increased to 7.5% of the electoral quota. There was no adjustments in the number of electorates between the South and North Islands, but the law changes resulted in boundary adjustments to almost every electorate through the 1952 electoral redistribution; only five electorates were unaltered. Five electorates were reconstituted (including Manukau) and one was newly created, and a corresponding six electorates were abolished; all of these in the North Island. These changes took effect with the 1954 election.

The electorate was in the southern section of greater Auckland, and was centred on Manukau.

== History ==
The electorate existed from 1881 to 1938 and then from 1954 to 1978. It was represented by nine Members of Parliament.

Matthew Kirkbride was elected to the Manukau electorate in the 1902 general election, and held the electorate until he died in 1906. His death caused the 6 December 1906 Manukau by-election, which was won by Frederic Lang.

Bill Jordan was first elected in the 1922 general election and was confirmed in the next four elections. When the Labour Party won the 1935 general election and formed the First Labour Government of New Zealand, Jordan expected a cabinet position. Instead, he was appointed to the post of New Zealand High Commissioner to the United Kingdom, which had until that point been traditionally a retirement post for former cabinet ministers. His resignation from Parliament caused the 30 September 1936 Manukau by-election, which was won by Arthur Osborne.

=== Members of Parliament ===
Key

Independent Conservative Liberal Reform Labour National

Election	Winner
1881 election	Maurice O'Rorke
1884 election	Maurice O'Rorke
1887 election	Maurice O'Rorke
1890 election	Frank Buckland
1893 election	Maurice O'Rorke
1896 election	Maurice O'Rorke
1896 election	Maurice O'Rorke
1899 election	Maurice O'Rorke
1902 election	Matthew Kirkbride
1905 election	Matthew Kirkbride
1906 by-election	Frederic Lang
1908 election	Frederic Lang
1911 election	Frederic Lang
1914 election	Frederic Lang
1919 election	Frederic Lang
1922 election	Bill Jordan
1925 election	Bill Jordan
1928 election	Bill Jordan
1931 election	Bill Jordan
1935 election	Bill Jordan
1936 by-election	Arthur Osborne
(Electorate abolished 1938–1954; see Onehunga)
1954 election	Leon Götz
1957 election	Leon Götz
1960 election	Leon Götz
1963 election	Colin Moyle
1966 election	Colin Moyle
1969 election	Roger Douglas
1972 election	Roger Douglas
1975 election	Roger Douglas
(Electorate abolished in 1978; see Manurewa)

== Election results ==
=== 1975 election ===
1975 general election: Manukau
Party	Candidate	Votes	%	±%
Labour	Roger Douglas	7,495	47.65	−9.54
National	Brian Leaming	6,817	43.34	
Social Credit	Robert McKee	760	4.83	
Values	Chris Jackson	626	3.98	
Socialist Unity	Alan Marston	18	0.11	
Liberal	Ron Te Rite Pahi	10	0.06	
Majority		678	4.31	−16.46
Turnout		15,726	77.21	−9.16
Registered electors		20,366		

=== 1972 election ===
1972 general election: Manukau
Party	Candidate	Votes	%	±%
Labour	Roger Douglas	7,830	57.19	+7.74
National	R O Price	4,986	36.42	
Social Credit	Frederick Coles Jordan	774	5.65	+0.24
New Democratic	C E Inglis	100	0.73	
Majority		2,844	20.77	+15.63
Turnout		13,690	86.37	+0.56
Registered electors		15,850		

=== 1969 election ===
1969 general election: Manukau
Party	Candidate	Votes	%	±%
Labour	Roger Douglas	8,404	49.45	
National	Ronald Alfred Walden	7,529	44.30	
Social Credit	Frederick Coles Jordan	921	5.41	−4.16
Independent Labour	Barry Moss	140	0.82	
Majority		875	5.14	
Turnout		16,994	85.81	+1.28
Registered electors		19,802		

=== 1966 election ===
1966 general election: Manukau
Party	Candidate	Votes	%	±%
Labour	Colin Moyle	8,796	52.36	+2.41
National	Max Louis Peers	6,068	36.12	
Social Credit	Frederick Coles Jordan	1,609	9.57	+5.55
Independent	Simon Michael Mill	207	1.23	
Communist	Rita Smith	86	0.51	
Majority		2,728	16.24	+11.38
Turnout		16,796	87.09	−4.22
Registered electors		19,284		

=== 1963 election ===
1963 general election: Manukau
Party	Candidate	Votes	%	±%
Labour	Colin Moyle	7,798	49.95	
National	Henry Christopher Pryor	7,009	44.90	
Social Credit	Frederick Coles Jordan	629	4.02	
Communist	Ray Gough	173	1.10	
Majority		759	4.86	
Turnout		15,609	91.31	−1.26
Registered electors		17,093		

=== 1960 election ===
1960 general election: Manukau
Party	Candidate	Votes	%	±%
National	Leon Götz	9,723	48.66	+0.78
Labour	Cyril Stamp	9,478	47.43	+0.57
Social Credit	Thomas Higham	778	3.89	−1.35
Majority		245	1.22	+0.21
Turnout		19,979	92.57	−1.31
Registered electors		21,581		

=== 1957 election ===
1957 general election: Manukau
Party	Candidate	Votes	%	±%
National	Leon Götz	7,480	47.88	−8.48
Labour	Cyril Stamp	7,321	46.86	+9.91
Social Credit	Thomas Higham	820	5.24	
Majority		159	1.01	−18.40
Turnout		15,621	93.88	+4.14
Registered electors		16,638		

=== 1954 election ===
1954 general election: Manukau
Party	Candidate	Votes	%	±%
National	Leon Götz	8,918	56.36	
Labour	Cyril Stamp	5,846	36.95	
Social Credit	Douglas Lance Henderson	1,057	6.68	
Majority		3,072	19.41	
Turnout		15,821	89.74	
Registered electors		17,628		

=== 1936 by-election ===
1936 Manukau by-election
Party	Candidate	Votes	%	±%
Labour	Arthur Osborne	8,593	68.24	
National	Frederick Doidge	3,998	31.75	
Informal votes		22	0.17	−0.40
Majority		4,595	36.49	
Turnout		12,591	78.69	−11.10

=== 1935 election ===
1935 general election: Manukau
Party	Candidate	Votes	%	±%
Labour	Bill Jordan	9,345	70.22	+5.34
Reform	Herbert Jenner Wily	2,943	22.11	
Democrat	Herbert Thornley	1,020	7.66	
Informal votes		76	0.57	+0.35
Majority		6,402	48.10	+18.35
Turnout		13,308	89.79	+13.04
Registered electors		14,821		

=== 1931 election ===
1931 general election: Manukau
Party	Candidate	Votes	%	±%
Labour	Bill Jordan	7,401	64.88	+10.75
Reform	Stanley Rickards	4,007	35.12	
Informal votes		48	0.42	−0.31
Majority		3,394	29.75	−0.41
Turnout		11,456	76.75	−11.46
Registered electors		14,927		

=== 1928 election ===
1928 general election: Manukau
Party	Candidate	Votes	%	±%
Labour	Bill Jordan	6,567	54.13	+1.38
United	Kells Mason	2,908	23.97	
Reform	Bertram Bunn	2,657	21.90	
Informal votes		89	0.73	+0.12
Majority		3,659	30.16	+21.92
Turnout		12,221	88.21	−3.64
Registered electors		13,855		

=== 1925 election ===
1925 general election: Manukau
Party	Candidate	Votes	%	±%
Labour	Bill Jordan	6,748	52.75	+3.71
Reform	Jack Massey	5,964	46.62	
Informal votes		79	0.61	−0.32
Majority		1,054	8.24	+6.03
Turnout		12,791	91.85	+3.94
Registered electors		13,925		

=== 1922 election ===
1922 general election: Manukau
Party	Candidate	Votes	%	±%
Labour	Bill Jordan	4,620	49.04	
Reform	Frederic Lang	4,411	46.82	−7.16
Ind. Progressive	William Adnams	301	3.19	
Informal votes		88	0.93	−0.19
Majority		209	2.21	
Turnout		9,420	87.91	+5.70
Registered electors		10,715		

=== 1919 election ===
1919 general election: Manukau
Party	Candidate	Votes	%	±%
Reform	Frederic Lang	4,182	53.98	−2.55
Labour	Rex Mason	2,304	29.74	
Liberal	Charles E. Major	1,173	15.14	
Informal votes		87	1.12	−0.13
Majority		2,508	32.37	+19.31
Turnout		7,746	82.21	−2.19
Registered electors		9,422		

=== 1914 election ===
1914 general election: Manukau
Party	Candidate	Votes	%	±%
Reform	Frederic Lang	5,298	56.53	+1.14
Liberal	John McLarin	4,074	43.46	
Informal votes		118	1.25	−0.14
Majority		1,224	13.06	−19.16
Turnout		9,372	84.40	+4.19
Registered electors		11,103		

=== 1911 election ===
1911 general election: Manukau
Party	Candidate	Votes	%	±%
Reform	Frederic Lang	3,965	55.39	+4.00
Liberal	Ralph D. Stewart	1,658	23.16	
Liberal	Joseph Morton	1,435	20.04	+0.50
Informal votes		100	1.39	+0.25
Majority		2,307	32.22	+8.73
Turnout		7,158	80.21	−3.81
Registered electors		8,924		

=== 1908 election ===
1908 general election: Manukau
Party	Candidate	Votes	%	±%
Reform	Frederic Lang	2,995	51.39	−14.76
Independent	Alfred Creamer	1,626	27.90	
Liberal	Joseph Morton	1,139	19.54	
Informal votes		67	1.14	+0.67
Majority		1,369	23.49	−9.29
Turnout		5,827	84.02	+23.50
Registered electors		6,935		

=== 1906 by-election ===
1906 Manukau by-election
Party	Candidate	Votes	%	±%
Conservative	Frederic Lang	2,512	66.15	
Liberal	George Ballard	1,267	33.36	
Informal votes		18	0.47	−0.47
Majority		1,245	32.78	
Turnout		3,797	60.52	−25.28
Registered electors		6,273		

=== 1905 election ===
1905 general election: Manukau
Party	Candidate	Votes	%	±%
Conservative	Matthew Kirkbride	3,007	55.66	+3.15
Liberal	Ralph D. Stewart	2,344	43.39	
Informal votes		51	0.94	
Majority		663	12.27	+7.25
Turnout		5,402	85.80	+8.62
Registered electors		6,296		

=== 1902 election ===
1902 general election: Manukau
Party	Candidate	Votes	%	±%
Conservative	Matthew Kirkbride	2,372	52.51	
Liberal	Sir Maurice O'Rorke	2,145	47.48	−2.80
Majority		227	5.02	
Turnout		4,517	77.18	+3.18
Registered electors		5,852		

=== 1899 election ===
1899 general election: Manukau
Party	Candidate	Votes	%	±%
Liberal	Sir Maurice O'Rorke	1,967	50.28	−2.16
Independent	John Edward Taylor	936	23.93	
Conservative	Frank Buckland	516	13.19	−32.63
Conservative	Francis Hull	493	12.60	
Informal votes		38	0.96	−0.76
Majority		1,031	26.35	+19.73
Turnout		3,950	74.00	
Registered electors		5,338		

=== 1896 election ===
1896 general election: Manukau
Party	Candidate	Votes	%	±%
Liberal	Sir Maurice O'Rorke	1,702	52.44	+12.27
Conservative	Frank Buckland	1,487	45.82	+14.64
Informal votes		56	1.72	
Majority		215	6.62	−2.37
Turnout		3,245		

=== 1893 election ===
1893 general election: Manukau
Party	Candidate	Votes	%	±%
Liberal	Sir Maurice O'Rorke	1,126	40.17	−6.99
Conservative	Frank Buckland	874	31.18	−21.32
Independent	James Muir	799	28.50	
Independent	John McMahon	4	0.14	
Majority		252	8.99	
Turnout		2,803	69.41	+5.93
Registered electors		4,038		

=== 1890 election ===
1890 general election: Manukau
Party	Candidate	Votes	%	±%
Conservative	Frank Buckland	786	52.50	
Liberal	Sir Maurice O'Rorke	706	47.16	
Independent	Alex Grant	5	0.33	
Majority		80	5.34	
Turnout		1,497	63.48	
Registered electors		2,358		
