= 1900 in New Zealand =

- Decades: 1880s; 1890s; 1900s; 1910s; 1920s
- See also: History of New Zealand; List of years in New Zealand; Timeline of New Zealand history

The following lists events that happened during 1900 in New Zealand.

== Incumbents ==
=== Regal and viceregal ===
- Head of State – Queen Victoria
- Governor – The Earl of Ranfurly GCMG

=== Government and law ===
The 14th New Zealand Parliament continued. Government was

- Speaker of the House – Sir Maurice O'Rorke
- Prime Minister – Richard Seddon
- Minister of Finance – Richard Seddon
- Chief Justice – Sir Robert Stout

=== Parliamentary opposition ===
- Leader of the Opposition – William Russell (Independent).

=== Main centre leaders ===
- Mayor of Auckland – David Goldie
- Mayor of Wellington – John Aitken
- Mayor of Christchurch – Charles Louisson, William Reece
- Mayor of Dunedin – Robert Chisholm

== Events ==
- 6 January — A by-election in Otaki is held.
- 15 January —The New Zealand Mounted Rifles rout a Boer assault at Slingersfontein, South Africa.
- 9 February — Opening of the Wanganui Opera House by premier Richard Seddon.
- 15 February — New Zealand troops are part of the relief of Kimberley, South Africa.
- 27 April — A by-election in Auckland is held.
- 3 May — The first Roman Catholic seminary in New Zealand, Holy Cross College, Mosgiel, is established.
- May — Phosphate discovered on Nauru – mining begins later in the year.
- May–June — Tour of Pacific islands by Prime Minister Richard Seddon. Tonga, Niue, Fiji and the Cook Islands are visited.
- 18 July — A by-election in Waihemo is held.
- 5 August — 18 people die in a boating tragedy on the Mōtū River.
- 28 September — The New Zealand Government votes to incorporate the Cook Islands into New Zealand.
- October — The number of European electorates in the New Zealand Parliament is increased to 76.
- 23 October — The country's first electric tram service begins, between Roslyn and Maori Hill in Dunedin.

Unknown date

- Māori Lands Administration Act passed.
- George Hemmings brings the first motor car into the South Island.
- The General Assembly Library (part of the New Zealand Parliament Buildings) is built.

== Arts and literature ==
See: 1900 in art, 1900 in literature, Category:1900 books

=== Music ===
See: 1900 in music

=== Film ===
- Alfred Henry Whitehouse's The Departure of the Second Contingent for the Boer War – the oldest known surviving New Zealand film – premieres.

== Sport ==
=== Athletics ===
National champions (Men):

- 100 yards – G. Smith (Auckland)
- 250 yards – G. Smith (Auckland)
- 440 yards – W Strickland (Hawke's Bay)
- 880 yards – J Lynskey (Canterbury)
- 1 mile – W Simpson (Canterbury)
- 3 miles – W Simpson (Canterbury)
- 120 yards hurdles – G. Smith (Auckland)
- 440 yards hurdles – G. Smith (Auckland)
- Long jump – Te Rangi Hīroa (Otago)
- High jump – C Laurie (Auckland)
- Pole vault – C Laurie (Auckland)
- Shot put – W Madill (Auckland)
- Hammer throw – W Madill (Auckland)

=== Badminton ===
The first club is formed, in Auckland, but soon goes into recess. (see also 1927)

=== Chess ===
National Champion: W.E. Mason of Wellington.

=== Cricket ===
- See 1900–01 New Zealand cricket season
- A tour of New Zealand by Australia's Melbourne Cricket Club included seven matches, of which the visitors won six with one match drawn.
- Six provincial matches were played during the 1899–1900 domestic season, all of them over two or three days, with wins by Otago over Hawke's Bay and Canterbury, by Wellington and Auckland over Otago, and by Canterbury and Auckland over Wellington.
- Scores were uniformly low by modern standards, mostly below 200, with only two centuries scored and only one team total of over 300 runs: the highest team total was 464 by Wellington against Otago, with centuries by F A Midlane (149) and C A Richardson (113), and the best bowling figures were A D Downes' 7–43 for Otago against Canterbury.

=== Golf ===
The 8th National Amateur Championships were held in Otago.

- Men: Arthur Duncan (Wellington) – 2nd title
- Women: K Rattray (Otago) – 3rd title

=== Horse racing ===
==== Harness racing ====
- Auckland Trotting Cup: Cob

==== Thoroughbred racing ====
- New Zealand Cup winner: Fulmen Ideal
- New Zealand Derby winner: Renown
- Auckland Cup winner: Blue Jacket
- Wellington Cup winner: Djin Djin
- Top New Zealand stakes earner: Advance
- Leading flat jockey: C Jenkins (50 wins)

=== Polo ===
- Savile Cup winners: Oroua (A Strang, J Strang, W Strang, O Robinson)

=== Rowing ===
- Men's national champions (coxed fours): Picton
- Men's national champions (coxless pairs): Wellington
- Men's national champions (double sculls): Canterbury
- Men's national champions (single sculls): T Spencer (Wellington)

=== Rugby union ===
Provincial club rugby champions include: City (Auckland); Westport (Buller); Christchurch (Canterbury); Pirates (Hawke's Bay); Levin (Horowhenua); Awarua (Marlborough); Alhambra (Otago); Gisborne (Poverty Bay); Hawera (Taranaki); Kaierau (Wanganui); Melrose (Wellington); winners of Bush, Nelson, and Wairarapa club competitions unknown.

see also Category:Rugby union in New Zealand

=== Shooting ===
- Ballinger Belt – no competition

=== Soccer ===
Provincial league champions:

- Auckland: Grafton AFC (Auckland)
- Otago: Roslyn Dunedin
- Wellington: Diamond Wellington

=== Swimming ===
National champions (men):

- 100 yards freestyle – G.A. Tyler
- 220 yards freestyle – G.A. Tyler
- 440 yards freestyle – G.A. Tyler

=== Tennis ===
New Zealand championships:

- Men's singles: J Hooper
- Women's singles: K Nunneley
- Men's doubles: C Cox/J Collins
- Women's doubles: K Nunneley/E Harman

References: Romanos, J. (2001) New Zealand Sporting Records and Lists. Auckland: Hodder Moa Beckett.

== Births ==
- 4 January: Lance Richdale, ornithologist (d. 1983)
- 19 January: Jerry Skinner, politician, deputy Prime Minister (in Australia) (d. 1962)
- 4 February: Kazimierz Wodzicki (d. 1987)
- 13 March: Quentin Donald (d. 1965)
- 25 March: Lewis Harris (d. 1983)
- 4 May: Archibald McIndoe, plastic surgeon (d. 1960)
- 8 May: Lancelot William McCaskill (d. 1985)
- 17 May: Robert Macfarlane (d. 1981)
- 3 June: James Anderson McPherson (d. 1980)
- 9 June: Norman Hargrave Taylor (d. 1975)
- 4 July: Rudall Hayward, filmmaker (d. 1974)
- 27 July (as Nina Betts): Nina Byron, silent film actress, dancer (d. 1987)
- 10 August: Arthur Porritt (d. 1994)
- 11 August: Alexander Astor (d. 1988)
- 1 September: Frederick McDowall (d. 1974)
- 7 September: Nora Sipos (d. 1988)
- 17 September: Hedwig Ross (d. 1971)
- 22 September: Henry Ah Kew (d. 1966)
- 23 September: Alwyn Warren (d. 1988)
- 14 October: Eddie McLeod, cricketer (d. 1989)
- 19 October: Edwin Coubray (d. 1997)
- 21 October: Quentin Pope (d. 1961)
- 3 November (in Durham, England): Roger Blunt, cricketer (d. 1966)
- 5 November: Esther James (d. 1990)
- 12 November: Stanley Graham (d. 1941)
- 23 November: Keith Buttle, mayor of Auckland (d. 1973)
- 27 November: Gordon Wilson (d. 1959)

== Deaths ==
- date unknown: Te Rangitahau
- 3 February: Elizabeth Pulman
- 3 March: Arthur Halcombe
- 12 March: James McDonald, politician
- 15 March: William Crowther, Mayor of Auckland, politician
- 22 March: Carl Gustav Schmitt
- May: Hirawanu Tapu
- 26 May: George Henry Frederick Ulrich
- 27 May: Ebenezer Hamlin, politician
- 20 July (in England): Andrew Russell; farmer, politician and soldier
- 28 September: Topi Patuki
- 4 October: William Skey
- 8 November: Charles O'Neill
- 9 December Archibald Hilson Ross (politician)
- 20 or 29 December (approximately, in Rome): Thomas Broham

== See also ==
- List of years in New Zealand
- Timeline of New Zealand history
- History of New Zealand
- Military history of New Zealand
- Timeline of the New Zealand environment
- Timeline of New Zealand's links with Antarctica

For world events and topics in 1900 not specifically related to New Zealand see: 1900
