= 1902 in New Zealand =

- Decades: 1880s; 1890s; 1900s; 1910s; 1920s
- See also: History of New Zealand; List of years in New Zealand; Timeline of New Zealand history

The following lists events that happened during 1902 in New Zealand.

== Incumbents ==
=== Regal and viceregal ===
- Head of State – Edward VII
- Governor – The Earl of Ranfurly GCMG

=== Government ===
The Liberal Party was re-elected and formed the 15th New Zealand Parliament.

- Speaker of the House – Maurice O'Rorke
- Prime Minister – Richard Seddon
- Minister of Finance – Richard Seddon
- Chief Justice – Sir Robert Stout

The number of members of the House of Representatives is increased from 74 to 80.

=== Parliamentary opposition ===
Leader of the Opposition – no recognised leader in 1902.

=== Main centre leaders ===
- Mayor of Auckland – Alfred Kidd
- Mayor of Wellington – John Aitken
- Mayor of Christchurch – Arthur Rhodes then Henry Wigram
- Mayor of Dunedin – George Denniston then James Park

== Events ==
- 28 October – The SS Ventnor sinks off the coast of Hokianga with the loss of 13 lives. The ship was carrying the remains of 499 Chinese men, most of whom had been involved in the Otago gold rush, back to China.

== Arts and literature ==
See 1902 in art, 1902 in literature

=== Music ===
See: 1902 in music

== Sport ==
=== Boxing ===
The New Zealand Boxing Association is formed to control and promote amateur boxing. The first national championships are held, in four weight divisions, in Christchurch.

==== National amateur champions ====
- Heavyweight – J. Fitzsimmons (Timaru)
- Middleweight – F. Nash (Christchurch)
- Lightweight – P. Oliver (Christchurch)
- Featherweight – A. Jones (Christchurch)

=== Chess ===
National Champion: R.J. Barnes of Wellington.

=== Golf ===
The 10th National Amateur Championships were held in Christchurch

- Men: S.H. Gollan (Napier)
- Women: Mrs ? Bidwell

=== Horse racing ===
==== Harness racing ====
- Auckland Trotting Cup: Van Dieman

=== Rugby ===
- The NZRFU decides upon a challenge format for the Ranfurly Cup competition. When the trophy arrives from Britain it turns out to in fact be a shield.
- 13 September – The Ranfurly Shield is first awarded to Auckland in recognition of their unbeaten record for the season.

=== Soccer ===
Provincial league champions:

- Auckland: North Shore
- Otago: Roslyn Dunedin
- Wellington: Wellington St. John's

== Births ==
- 24 January: Alan Stuart Paterson, cartoonist. (d. 1968)
- 1 May: Geoffrey Michael William Hodgkins, naturalist. (d. 1965)
- 8 May: Curly Page, cricketer. (d. 1987)
- 13 June: Gordon Minhinnick, cartoonist. (d. 1992)
- 16 June: Clarence Beeby, educationalist. (d. 1998)
- 3 July: Jack Newman, cricketer. (d. 1996)
- 23 July: Arthur Lindo Patterson, physicist. (d. 1966)
- 8 September: Bryan Todd, businessman. (d. 1987)
- Fred Hackett, politician. (d. 1963)
- (in Paris): Louise Henderson, painter. (d. 1994)
- Trevor Henry, supreme court judge. (d. 2007)

== Deaths ==
- 30 January: Alfred Renall, politician and mayor.
- 27 February: James Gordon Stuart Grant, a local eccentric in Dunedin.
- 26 June: William Garden Cowie, Bishop of Auckland and Anglican Primate of New Zealand
- 15 July: John McLean, politician and farmer.
- 18 October: Theodore Haultain, politician.
- 3 December: Robert Lawson, architect

== See also ==
- List of years in New Zealand
- Timeline of New Zealand history
- History of New Zealand
- Military history of New Zealand
- Timeline of the New Zealand environment
- Timeline of New Zealand's links with Antarctica
