= 1901 in New Zealand =

- Decades: 1880s; 1890s; 1900s; 1910s; 1920s
- See also: History of New Zealand; List of years in New Zealand; Timeline of New Zealand history

The following lists events that happened during 1901 in New Zealand.

== Population ==
A New Zealand census was held in March 1901. The population was given as 815,862, consisting of 43,112 Māori, 31 Moriori, and 772,719 others. – an increase in the non-Māori population of 9.86% over the previous census in 1896.

The figures for the 1901 census revealed that the North Island's population had exceeded the South Island's for the first time since the Otago gold rush of 1861 – the two islands (plus their associated minor offshore islands) had populations of 390,579 and 382,140 respectively. Only 40% of the country's population was based in urban centres, and only two of these centres, Auckland and Dunedin, had populations of over 25,000.

== Incumbents ==
=== Regal and viceregal ===
- Head of State – Victoria (until 22 January), succeeded by Edward VII
- Governor – The Earl of Ranfurly GCMG

=== Government ===
The 14th New Zealand Parliament continued. In government was the Liberal Party.

- Speaker of the House – Maurice O'Rorke (Liberal)
- Premier / Prime Minister – Richard Seddon
- Minister of Finance – Richard Seddon

=== Parliamentary opposition ===
- Leader of the Opposition – William Russell, (Independent) until 3 July, then vacant.

=== Main centre leaders ===
- Mayor of Auckland – Logan Campbell
- Mayor of Wellington – John Aitken
- Mayor of Christchurch – William Reece then Arthur Rhodes
- Mayor of Dunedin – Robert Chisholm then George Denniston

== Events ==
- 9 January — A Northern Maori by-election is held.
- 28 January — Captain William James Hardham becomes the first New Zealand-born winner of the Victoria Cross as a result of action in the South African War (Boer War).
- 2 February — a day of mourning acknowledging the death of Queen Victoria brings the nation to a standstill.
- 24 April
  - A mayoral election is held in Auckland City.
  - A mayoral election is held in Invercargill.
- 25 April — A mayoral election is held in Wellington City.
- 19 June — The 1901 New Zealand Royal Visit Honours are announced.
- 18 July
  - A City of Christchurch by-election is held.
  - A by-election is held in Patea.
- 12 September — The Nurses Registration Act 1901 is passed.
- 16 November — A 6.9 magnitude earthquake occurs in Cheviot
- 19 December — A Caversham by-election is held.
- Union of the Synod of Otago and Southland with the Northern Presbyterian Church to form the Presbyterian Church of Aotearoa New Zealand.
- The Duke and Duchess of Cornwall, later to become George V and Queen Mary, make the second visit to New Zealand by members of the Royal Family.
- The New Zealand Red Ensign becomes the official flag for merchant vessels.
- Founding of the New Zealand Socialist Party.
- New Zealand rejects the proposal to become a state in the Commonwealth of Australia
- Richard Seddon adopts the term Prime Minister rather than Premier.

== Arts and literature ==
See 1901 in art, 1901 in literature

=== Music ===
See: 1901 in music

== Sport ==
=== Chess ===
National Champion: D. Forsyth of Dunedin.

=== Golf ===
The 9th National Amateur Championships were held in Auckland

- Men: Arthur Duncan (Wellington) – 3rd title
- Women: E.S. Gillies

=== Horse racing ===
==== Harness racing ====
- Auckland Trotting Cup: Thorndean

=== Rugby ===
- The Earl of Ranfurly announced his intention to present a cup to the NZRFU, without stipulating what form of competition it should be awarded for.
- A New Zealand representative team won both test matches against a touring team from New South Wales.

=== Soccer ===
Provincial league champions:

- Auckland: Grafton AFC (Auckland)
- Otago: Roslyn Dunedin
- Wellington: Wellington Swifts

== Births ==
- 7 February: Arnold Nordmeyer, politician.
- 26 February: Leslie Munro, diplomat.
- 25 March: Raymond Firth, ethnologist.
- 10 April: Robert Aitken, physician and university administrator.
- 17 May: Robert Macfarlane, politician.
- 19 May: William Stevenson, industrialist and philanthropist.
- 13 June: John Cawte Beaglehole, historian and biographer.
- 15 June: Dove-Myer Robinson, long-serving mayor of Auckland.
- 5 July: Len Lye, sculptor, filmmaker, writer.
- 24 December: Nola Luxford, silent film actress.

== Deaths ==
- 14 February: Edward Stafford. politician and 3rd Premier of New Zealand.
- 17 April Loughlin O'Brien, politician.
- 15 July: Frederic Carrington, surveyor and politician.
- 6 August (in Scotland): John McKenzie, politician
- 2 September:
  - Charles Brown, politician
  - Benjamin Crisp, carrier and temperance reformer
- 27 September: Matthew Holmes, politician
- 5 December Francis Rich, politician and farmer.

== See also ==
- List of years in New Zealand
- Timeline of New Zealand history
- History of New Zealand
- Military history of New Zealand
- Timeline of the New Zealand environment
- Timeline of New Zealand's links with Antarctica
