= 1899 in New Zealand =

- Decades: 1870s; 1880s; 1890s; 1900s; 1910s
- See also: History of New Zealand; List of years in New Zealand; Timeline of New Zealand history

The following lists events that happened during 1899 in New Zealand.

== Incumbents ==
=== Regal and viceregal ===
- Head of State – Queen Victoria
- Governor – The Earl of Ranfurly GCMG

=== Government and law ===
The Liberal Party is re-elected and forms the 14th New Zealand Parliament. The number of MPs is increased to 80.

- Speaker of the House – Sir Maurice O'Rorke
- Prime Minister – Richard Seddon
- Minister of Finance – Richard Seddon
- Chief Justice – Sir Robert Stout replaced Hon Sir James Prendergast

=== Parliamentary opposition ===
- Leader of the Opposition – William Russell, (Independent).

=== Main centre leaders ===
- Mayor of Auckland – David Goldie
- Mayor of Christchurch – Charles Louisson
- Mayor of Dunedin – William Swan followed by Robert Chisholm
- Mayor of Wellington – John Rutherfurd Blair

== Events ==
- 28 September: Prime Minister Richard Seddon asks Parliament to approve the offer to the imperial government of a contingent of mounted rifles and the raising of such a force if the offer were accepted and thus becoming the first British Colony to send troops to the Boer war. The first New Zealand Army contingent leaves for South Africa before the end of the year.
- 2 November: The first aviation fatality in New Zealand. Balloonist David Maloney (alias Captain Charles Lorraine) is blown out to sea after taking off from Lancaster Park. The balloon crashes into the sea and although Maloney is seen to survive by the time rescuers arrive there is no sign of him and his body is never found.
- 6 December: General election.
- 19 December: Māori vote for the general election.

=== Undated ===
- The Government legislates that from 1900 Labour Day will be a public holiday.
- British expedition led by Carstens Borchgrevink, including several New Zealanders, establishes first base in Antarctica, at Cape Adare

== Economy ==
- Kauri gum exports peak at 11,116 tons.

== Sport ==
=== Athletics ===
National champions, Men

- 100 yards – George Smith (Auckland)
- 250 yards – W. Kingston (Otago)
- 440 yards – W. Kingston (Otago)
- 880 yards – C. Hill (Hawkes Bay)
- 1 mile – S. Pentecost (Canterbury)
- 3 miles – P. Malthus (South Canterbury)
- 120 yards hurdles – George Smith (Auckland)
- 440 yards hurdles – George Smith (Auckland)
- Long jump – R. Brownlee (Otago)
- High jump – R. Brownlee (Otago)
- Pole vault – Jimmy Te Paa (Auckland)
- Shot put – O. McCormack (Otago)
- Hammer throw – W. Madill (Auckland)

=== Chess ===
National Champion: No tournament held in calendar year (see 1898)

=== Golf ===
The National Amateur Championships were held in Wellington

- Men – Arthur Duncan (Wellington) – first title
- Women – K. Rattray (Otago) – second title

=== Horse racing ===
==== Harness racing ====
- Auckland Trotting Cup (over 2 miles) is won by Billy Wilson

==== Thoroughbred racing ====
- New Zealand Cup – Seahorse
- New Zealand Derby – Seahorse
- Auckland Cup – Blue Jacket
- Wellington Cup – Daunt

==== Season leaders (1898/99) ====
- Top New Zealand stakes earner – Screw Gun
- Leading flat jockey – C. Jenkins

=== Lawn Bowls ===
National Champions

- Singles – W. Carswell (Taieri)
- Pairs – T. Mackie and W. Carswell (skip) (Taieri)
- Fours – A. Luoisson, H. Nalder, A. Bishop and W. Barnett (skip) (Christchurch)

=== Polo ===
- Savile Cup winners – Oroua

=== Rowing ===
National Champions (Men)

- Coxed fours – Picton
- Coxless pairs – Wellington
- Double sculls – Star
- Single sculls – P. Graham (North Shore)

=== Rugby union ===
Provincial club rugby champions include:

see also Category:Rugby union in New Zealand

=== Shooting ===
Ballinger Belt – Bandmaster W. King (Oamaru Rifles)

=== Soccer ===
Provincial league champions:

- Auckland: Auckland United
- Otago: Roslyn Dunedin
- Wellington: Wellington Rovers

=== Swimming ===
National champions (Men)

- 100 yards freestyle – T. Edwards (Canterbury)
- 220 yards freestyle – J. Hamilton (Wellington)

=== Tennis ===
National championships

- Men's singles – C. Cox
- Women's singles – Kathleen Nunneley
- Men's doubles – C. Cox and J. Collins
- Women's doubles – Kathleen Nunneley and C. Lean

== Births ==
- 25 March: Burt Munro, record-setting motorcyclist
- 14 June: Philip Skoglund, politician.
- 26 July: Charles William "Bill" Hamilton, inventor of the jetboat.
- 14 November: Philip Connolly, politician.

== Deaths ==
- 8 November: Thomas McDonnell, public servant and military leader.
- 28 November: Sophia Ann Bates, teacher and postmistress.

== See also ==
- List of years in New Zealand
- Timeline of New Zealand history
- History of New Zealand
- Military history of New Zealand
- Timeline of the New Zealand environment
- Timeline of New Zealand's links with Antarctica
