= James McPherson =

James McPherson may refer to:

- James Alan McPherson (1943–2016), American short story writer and essayist, and winner of the Pulitzer Prize for fiction
- James Alpin McPherson (1842–1895), Australian bushranger
- James B. McPherson (1828–1864), general in the United States Civil War
- James M. McPherson (born 1936), Pulitzer Prize–winning United States history professor and Civil War historian
- James E. McPherson (born 1953), acting United States Secretary of the Navy
- James Unaipon (died 1907), Australian Aboriginal leader (used the surname McPherson prior to 1861)
- James McPherson (cricketer) (1842–1891), Australian cricketer
- James McPherson (football coach) (1891–1960), Scottish football trainer and coach
- James McPherson (New Zealand politician) (1831/32–1905), Member of Parliament in the Waikato Region of New Zealand
- James Anderson McPherson (1900–1980), New Zealand horticulturist, horticultural administrator and writer
- James L. McPherson (1881–1951), member of the Alberta Legislature from 1935 to 1952
- Jim McPherson, former member of the Alberta Legislature from 1982 to 1986

== See also ==
- James Macpherson (disambiguation)
