= 1903 in New Zealand =

- Decades: 1880s; 1890s; 1900s; 1910s; 1920s
- See also: History of New Zealand; List of years in New Zealand; Timeline of New Zealand history

The following lists events that happened during 1903 in New Zealand.

== Incumbents ==
=== Regal and viceregal ===
- Head of State – Edward VII
- Governor – The Earl of Ranfurly GCMG

=== Government ===
The 15th New Zealand Parliament continued. In government was the Liberal Party.

- Speaker of the House – Arthur Guinness (Liberal)
- Prime Minister – Richard Seddon
- Minister of Finance – Richard Seddon
- Chief Justice – Sir Robert Stout

=== Parliamentary opposition ===
- Leader of the Opposition – Vacant until 11 September, then William Massey, (Independent).

=== Main centre leaders ===
- Mayor of Auckland – Alfred Kidd then Edwin Mitchelson
- Mayor of Wellington – John Aitken
- Mayor of Christchurch – Henry Wigram
- Mayor of Dunedin – James Park then Thomas Scott

== Events ==
=== September ===
26 September – New Zealand is the first country in the world to pass a Wireless Telegraphy Act.

== Arts and literature ==
See 1903 in art, 1903 in literature

=== Music ===
See: 1903 in music

=== Film ===
- A Message from Mars

== Sport ==
=== Boxing ===
The Bantamweight division is included in the national championships for the first time.

National amateur champions

- Heavyweight – H. Taylor (Greymouth)
- Middleweight – J. Griffin (Invercargill)
- Lightweight – A. Farquharson (Dunedin)
- Featherweight – A. Parker (Christchurch)
- Bantamweight – J. Pearce (Christchurch)

=== Chess ===
National Champion: J.C. Grierson of Auckland.

=== Golf ===
The 11th National Amateur Championships were held in Napier

- Men: Kurepo Tareha (Napier)
- Women: A. E Pearce

=== Horse racing ===
==== Harness racing ====
- Auckland Trotting Cup: Plain G

=== Rugby union ===
- 1903 New Zealand rugby union tour of Australia

=== Soccer ===
Provincial league champions:

- Auckland: YMCA Auckland
- Otago: Northern
- Wellington: Wellington St. John's

== Births ==
- 30 January: Colin Scrimgeour, minister and broadcaster.
- 6 February: Jack Dunning, cricketer
- 21 February: P. H. Matthews, politician
- 11 March: George Dickinson, cricketer
- 11 March: Ronald Syme, historian
- 21 March: Frank Sargeson, writer
- 28 March: Merton Hodge, west-end playwright
- 23 April: John Stewart, politician.
- 10 June: Count Geoffrey Potocki de Montalk, poet.
- 6 July: Edward Musgrave Blaiklock, academic.
- 4 August: Charles Bateson, historian and writer
- 2 November: Anna Lois White, painter
- 15 November: Stewie Dempster, cricketer

== Deaths ==
- 7 March: John Studholme, politician and farmer (born 1829).
- 23 April: William Travers, politician (born 1819).
- 11 June: Thomas Mason, horticulturist and politician.
- 7 July: Agnes Harrold, hotel manager, foster parent, nurse and midwife
- 30 August: Joe Warbrick, rugby player (born 1862).

== See also ==
- History of New Zealand
- List of years in New Zealand
- Military history of New Zealand
- Timeline of New Zealand history
- Timeline of New Zealand's links with Antarctica
- Timeline of the New Zealand environment
