= 1905 in New Zealand =

- Decades: 1880s; 1890s; 1900s; 1910s; 1920s
- See also: History of New Zealand; List of years in New Zealand; Timeline of New Zealand history

The following lists events that happened during 1905 in New Zealand.

== Incumbents ==
=== Regal and viceregal ===
- Head of State – Edward VII
- Governor – The Lord Plunket GCMG KCVO

=== Government ===
The Liberal Party are re-elected and formed the 16th New Zealand Parliament.

- Speaker of the House – Arthur Guinness (Liberal)
- Prime Minister – Richard Seddon
- Minister of Finance – Richard Seddon
- Chief Justice – Sir Robert Stout

=== Parliamentary opposition ===
- Leader of the Opposition – William Massey, (Independent).

=== Main centre leaders ===
Municipal elections are held on 27 April:

- Mayor of Auckland – Edwin Mitchelson then Arthur Myers
- Mayor of Wellington – Thomas Hislop
- Mayor of Christchurch – Charles Gray
- Mayor of Dunedin – Thomas Christie – then Joseph Braithwaite

== Events ==
- The Marlborough Herald begins publication. The Herald continues until 1911. The Marlborough Express stops publishing The Marlborough Times, which started in 1874.

== Arts and literature ==
See 1905 in art, 1905 in literature

=== Music ===
See: 1905 in music

=== Film ===
See: Category:1905 film awards, 1905 in film, List of New Zealand feature films, Cinema of New Zealand, Category:1905 films

== Sport ==
=== Association football ===
- The first overseas tour by a New Zealand representative team takes place, to Australia.
  - 10 June vs Wellington in Wellington (pre-tour warm-up)
  - 17 June, Sydney: Lost 2–3 vs Metropolitan Association
  - 21 June, Sydney: Won 8–3 vs Wednesday Association
  - 24 June, Sydney: Won 6–4 vs New South Wales
  - 28 June, Sydney: Lost 2–3 vs Navy
  - 1 July, Sydney: Lost 0–2 vs New South Wales
  - 5 July, Newcastle: Won 5–4 vs Northern Districts
  - 8 July, Newcastle: Won 1–0 vs Northern Districts
  - 12 July, Sydney: Won 6–2 vs Granville
  - 15 July, Wollongong: Drew 3–3 vs South Coast
  - 19 July, Sydney: Won 5–0 vs Metropolitan Association
  - 22 July, Sydney: Drew 1–1 vs New South Wales

This is the last NZ representative team until 1922.

=== Boxing ===
==== National amateur champions ====
- Heavyweight – W. Robertson (Ashburton)
- Middleweight – A. Leckie (Dunedin)
- Lightweight – G. Williams (Palmerston North)
- Featherweight – J. Morris (Dunedin)
- Bantamweight – E. Baird (Christchurch)

=== Chess ===
The 18th National Chess championship is held in Oamaru. The champion is A.W.O. Davies

=== Golf ===
- The 13th National Amateur Championships are held in Auckland
  - Men: Arthur Duncan (Wellington) – 4th title
  - Women: Miss A. Stephenson
- Women's golf, previously organised by the Men's association, comes under the auspices of the British Ladies Golf Union.

=== Horse racing ===
==== Harness racing ====
- New Zealand Trotting Cup: Birchmark
- Auckland Trotting Cup: Le Rosier

=== Rugby ===
- Ranfurly Shield – Wellington successfully defend the shield against Wairarapa (3–3) and Hawkes Bay (11–3) before losing to Auckland (6–10).

=== Soccer ===
Provincial league champions:

- Auckland: Auckland Corinthians
- Canterbury: Christchurch Celtic
- Otago: Kaitangata FC
- Southland: Nightcaps
- Taranaki: Waitara
- Wellington: Diamond Wellington

== Births ==
- 10 January: R. A. K. Mason, poet. (d. 1971)
- 25 February: Iriaka Rātana, politician. (d. 1981)
- 29 March: Dan Bryant, schoolteacher and mountaineer (d. 1957)
- 5 April: Guy Powles, diplomat and ombudsman. (d. 1994)
- 25 June: Ian Cromb, cricketer. (d. 1984)
- 28 June: Norman Shelton, politician. (d. 1980)
- 29 June: Oswald Denison, rower. (d. 1990)
- 9 July: John Guthrie, journalist and novelist (d. 1955)
- 3 September: John Mills, cricketer. (d. 1972)
- 29 October: John (Jack) Lamason, cricketer. (d. 1961)
- 10 December: Neil Watson, politician. (d. 1990)

== Deaths ==
- 6 January: Bendix Hallenstein, merchant.
- 14 March: George Fisher, politician.
- 22 April: Mary Gabriel Gill, Catholic prioress
- 6 June: Marion Hatton, suffragist
- 27 June: Te Keepa Te Rangi-pūawhe, Māori tribal leader, soldier and entrepreneur
- 20 October: John Thomas Peacock, businessman and politician
- 18 November: Te Whiti o Rongomai, Māori leader, pacifist.

== See also ==
- History of New Zealand
- List of years in New Zealand
- Military history of New Zealand
- Timeline of New Zealand history
- Timeline of New Zealand's links with Antarctica
- Timeline of the New Zealand environment
