= 1904 in New Zealand =

- Decades: 1880s; 1890s; 1900s; 1910s; 1920s
- See also: History of New Zealand; List of years in New Zealand; Timeline of New Zealand history

The following lists events that happened during 1904 in New Zealand.

== Incumbents ==
=== Regal and viceregal ===
- Head of State – Edward VII
- Governor – The Earl of Ranfurly GCMG, succeeded the same year by The Lord Plunket GCMG KCVO

=== Government ===
The 15th New Zealand Parliament continued. In government was the Liberal Party.

- Speaker of the House – Arthur Guinness (Liberal)
- Prime Minister – Richard Seddon
- Minister of Finance – Richard Seddon
- Chief Justice – Sir Robert Stout

=== Parliamentary opposition ===
- Leader of the Opposition – William Massey, (Independent).

=== Main centre leaders ===
- Mayor of Auckland – Edwin Mitchelson
- Mayor of Wellington – John Aitken then Thomas Hislop
- Mayor of Christchurch – Henry Wigram then Charles Gray
- Mayor of Dunedin – Thomas Scott, then Thomas Christie

== Events ==
- 13 January: Portobello Marine Laboratory opens, initially as a fish hatchery
- 17 March: The New Zealand Horticultural Trades Association is founded in Normanby.
- 9 August: A magnitude 7.0-7.2 earthquake strikes Cape Turnagain, causing one death.
- September: The Canterbury Steam Shipping Co is founded in Christchurch.
- 15 November: The Waikato Independent begins publishing in Cambridge. The newspaper became the Cambridge Independent in 1966. It closed in 1995.

== Arts and literature ==
See 1904 in art, 1904 in literature, Category:1904 books

=== Music ===
See: 1904 in music

== Sport ==
=== Association football ===
- A New South Wales representative team tours, playing a New Zealand team in Dunedin and Wellington. These are the first recognised matches by a New Zealand national football team.
  - 23 July, Dunedin: NZ loses 0–1
  - 30 July, Wellington: Draw 3–3

=== Boxing ===
National amateur champions

- Heavyweight – J. Griffin (Greymouth)
- Middleweight – J. Griffin (Greymouth)
- Lightweight – T. Rickards (Christchurch)
- Featherweight – J. Watson (Christchurch)
- Bantamweight – J. Gosling (Wellington)

=== Chess ===
- The 17th National Chess championship was held in Wellington. The champion was W.E. Mason of Wellington.

=== Golf ===
The 12th National Amateur Championships were held in Otago

- Men: A.H. Fisher (Otago)
- Women: Miss E. Lewis

=== Horse racing ===
==== Harness racing ====
- The inaugural running of the New Zealand Trotting Cup is won by Monte Carlo
- Auckland Trotting Cup: Rebel Boy

=== Rugby union ===
- Wellington defeat Auckland 6-3, becoming the first challenger to win the Ranfurly Shield.
- Wellington defend the Ranfurly shield against Canterbury (6–3) and Otago (15–13).

=== Soccer ===
Provincial league champions:

- Auckland: Auckland Corinthians
- Otago: Northern
- Southland: Nightcaps
- Taranaki: New Plymouth
- Wellington: Diamond Wellington

== Births ==
- 2 February: A. R. D. Fairburn, poet. (died 1957)
- 7 February: Morton Coutts, invented the continuous fermentation method of brewing beer. (died 2004)
- 11 February: Keith Holyoake, politician and 26th Prime Minister. (died 1983)
- 12 March: Ken James, cricketer. (died 1976)
- 13 July: Jim Burrows, teacher, sportsman, administrator, and military leader (died 1991)
- 24 December: Thomas O'Halloran, Australian Rules footballer. (died 1956)

Category:1904 births

== Deaths ==
- 5 January: William Walker, politician and speaker of the Legislative Council (b. 1837).
- 11 February: George Lumsden, politician (b. 1815).
- 22 February: James Nairn, painter (b. 1859)
- 16 April: Charles Edward Haughton, politician (b. 1827).
- 2 October: Thomas Ellison, rugby player (b. c1867).
- 11 December: Octavius Hadfield, Anglican Primate of New Zealand (b. 1814).
- Tamati Ngakaho, a Ngāti Porou carver.

Category:1904 deaths

== See also ==
- History of New Zealand
- List of years in New Zealand
- Military history of New Zealand
- Timeline of New Zealand history
- Timeline of New Zealand's links with Antarctica
- Timeline of the New Zealand environment
