= Tongan music notation =

The Tuʻungafasi or Tongan music notation is a subset of the standard music notation, originally developed by the missionary James Egan Moulton in the 19th century for singing church hymns in Tonga.

== The notation ==
Tongan music from the pre-European times was not really music in the current sense but rather a non tonic recital (like the 'pater noster'), a style still known nowadays as the tau fakaniua. Therefore, when the missionaries started to teach singing, they had also to start with music from scratch. They found the do-re-mi-fa-sol-la-si-do scale sufficient for their needs, avoiding the very complex and difficult to learn international music notation. But due to the limited number of consonants in the Tongan language, the note names were localised into to-le-mi… Unfortunately the word 'tole' is a vulgar expression for the female genital area, and as such not to be used.

Moulton then developed a system where the main notes were indicated with the numbers 3 to 9, while a strike to the digits was used to sharpen them, for example: ~~7~~, being 7♯ or 8♭. At the end the full 12 notes of the octave became: 3-~~3~~-4-~~4~~-5-6-~~6~~-7-~~7~~-8-~~8~~-9, which are pronounced as: to-lu-fa-ma-ni-o-no-tu-fi-va-a-hi, (variants of the Tongan numerals 3 to 9 being tolu, fā, nima, ono, fitu, valu, hiva). To extend the single octave (MIDI octave number 4) into the next higher, a dot can be put above the number. To reach the next lower, a dot or a little tail can be put under them. If needed 2 tails can be taken to arrive at even lower pitches, but that is rare. Since the notation is made for human singing, it does not need to have the extended range of musical instruments.

The Moulton notation, or Tongan notation was extremely popular and is still cherished by the Tongans. It is extremely common to see bandmasters writing out the music on the blackboards in the church halls during choir practices.

=== Pitch ===
Tongan singers recognise up to 4 voices, which results in the typical 4 lines of numbers in the notation. The leading voice is called 'fasi', a male voice. The next one is kānokano or alto, a female voice. The third is the tēnoa or tenor, and the last one the laulalo or bass. Occasionally the bass sings different lyrics from the rest. The middle octave (of the 3 octave range mentioned above) varies with the voice, the kānokano is usually one above the tēnoa, while the laulalo is one below. In addition the exact position of the middle C depends on the key signature as in this schedule:

When 3 notes are shown, the fasi and alto are together on top, the tenor is in the middle, and the bass is on bottom. When 2 notes are shown, the tenor and bass are taken together, as otherwise the basses would come too low. Some musicians, however, take the bass octave always equal the tenor, causing for some signatures the bass coming too high. Then they need 2 tails under a number to reach a really low note.

=== Duration ===
The duration of a note is not indicated by a different symbols, as in the international music notation but by the number of notes in a beat. The more notes in a beat, the shorter each has to be. For example, in "Ko e fasi ʻo e tuʻi ʻo e ʻOtu Tonga" (the national anthem), we find as first measure: |3:-3/5:5|6:4/5:-5|

Every vertical bar (|) is a measure separator (often double at the begin and end of a stanza). As this music has a 4/4 time signature, there appear 4 beats, every beat separated by a colon (:) or slash (/) (they are equal, but the slash is usually used in the middle and the colon elsewhere). The time signature also indicates that every beat is a quarter note. Therefore, every single digit in a beat is a quarter note. When 2 digits appear they are each eighth notes and so forth. No digit at all, or a zero, is used for a rest, while a dash is a tie. The first measure of the example above thus becomes: a C note for a dotted quarter duration, another C for an eighth, followed by two quarter Es.

|3:-|-:-| is an example for a 2/4 time signature; 2 beats in a measure, every beat a quarter note long. This results in a whole C. Note that the tie dashes can extend into following measures, unlike the international music notation where the note is to be repeated and then tie arcs are needed. Some Tonga musicians following that example, would also write a 3 in the second measure instead of a dash and also would then need tie arcs.

=== More time signatures ===
In 2/4 (like |3:4|) and 3/4 (like |3:4:5|) and 4/4 (like |3:4/5:6|) time signature every beat is a quarter note. Two digits (…:34:…) makes each an eighth note; have four digits (…:3456:…) and each is a sixteenth. Three digits (…:345:…) are possible, the first one being a quarter and both others each an eighth, but might be confusing. Some musicians put a comma or dot inside the beat (…:3,45:…) to remind the singers of the unequal duration. But the real use is with a tie (…:3-4:…), to have a dotted quarter note followed by an eighth.

2/2 and 3/2 signatures are rarer, but work the same as the quarter-based signatures except that all beats are twice as long. One digit in a beat being a half note and so forth.

Occasionally one finds 6/8 (like |3:4|) and 12/8 (like |3:4:5:6|) time signatures. Then every single digit is a dotted quarter note, while the most common occurrence is 3 digits in one beat, (…:345:…) each of them of course one eighth. Also here two digits are possible, the first one being a quarter and the second an eight, but again with all the pitfalls as the 3 digits in the quarter-note notation. It is mainly used for (…:3:-4:…) meaning a note worth five eighths (dotted quarter tied to quarter) followed by a single eighth.
