= Hannah Ward Barron =

New Zealand Businesswoman, hotel proprietor

- Born: Hannah Dorney; 14 July 1829; Cork, County Cork, Ireland
- Died: 10 November 1898 (aged 69); Bluff, New Zealand
- Other name: Hannah Ward
- Occupations: businesswoman and hotel proprietor
- Children: Mary Eliza Frances; William Thomas Ward; Sir Joseph Ward

Hannah Ward Barron (14 July 1829 – 10 November 1898) was a successful businesswoman, hotel proprietor and landowner in New Zealand.

== Biography ==
She was born in Cork, County Cork, Ireland, on 14 July 1829, the oldest daughter and third child of Elizabeth Lynch and shopkeeper Thomas Dorney. Initially, she was given the first name Joanna, but soon she chose Hannah instead. In Ireland, she learned how to read, write, sing, and play piano and she was raised a devout Roman Catholic, "which sustained her all her life."

Hannah survived the Irish famine (1845-1849) and married William Ward "probably on 7 October 1850," in Cork, Ireland. Only a few years later, William Ward set out for London and then Melbourne, Australia, arriving in August 1853. Soon thereafter, while pregnant and carrying two infants, Hannah followed him, arriving on 24 October 1853. The young family lived in the Melbourne area, but William "did not prosper." To support the family, Hannah went to work, operating a small shop and then a lodging house on Abbotsford Street, providing housing for miners. In time, she gave birth to more children, but her husband and seven of her eight sons died from the many diseases that spread through the overcrowded city.

She was married again on 31 December 1862, to a butcher from Northumberland, England, named John Barron, and from then on was known as Hannah Ward Barron. However, her second marriage was not successful and nine months later, in September 1863, Hannah and her three surviving children sailed for New Zealand. They settled in Campbelltown (now known as Bluff), situated in a southern-most point of New Zealand. Hannah soon opened a shop for miners who worked in nearby goldfields.

Eventually, the goldfields were depleted and Hannah opened a lodge for sailors located near the wharf. Her business flourished and she borrowed enough money to buy land and convert her boarding house into the Club Hotel in Bluff. There, she thrived as an innkeeper and landowner and managed the hotel until her death.

Hannah died 10 November 1898 in the Bluff home of her daughter, Mary (Mina) Eliza Frances. She was survived by Mary and her two sons William Thomas Ward and Joseph Ward (1856–1930), who was active in politics and became the 17th prime minister of New Zealand from 1906 to 1912, and again from 1928 to 1930.

== See also ==
- Bassett, M. 'In search of Sir Joseph Ward'. New Zealand Journal of History 21, No 1 (1987): 112—124
