= James Macpherson (disambiguation) =

James Macpherson (1736–1796) was a Scottish poet.

James Macpherson may also refer to:

- James MacPherson (actor) (born 1960), Scottish actor who starred in ITV drama Taggart
- James MacPherson (American football) (born 1980), American football player
- James Macpherson (trade unionist) (died 1932), British trade unionist and political activist
- (James) Ian Macpherson, 1st Baron Strathcarron (1880–1937), British lawyer and politician
- Jim Macpherson (born 1966), American drummer in various rock acts
- James Macpherson (outlaw) (c.1675–1700), hanged in Banff, Scotland
- James C. MacPherson, justice of the Court of Appeal for Ontario
- James Philip Macpherson, Australian politician and pastoralist in the colony of Victoria
- James MacPherson, a character in the television series Warehouse 13

== See also ==
- James McPherson (disambiguation)
