= Ko e fasi ʻo e tuʻi ʻo e ʻOtu Tonga =

National anthem of Tonga

English: Song of the King of the Tonga Islands
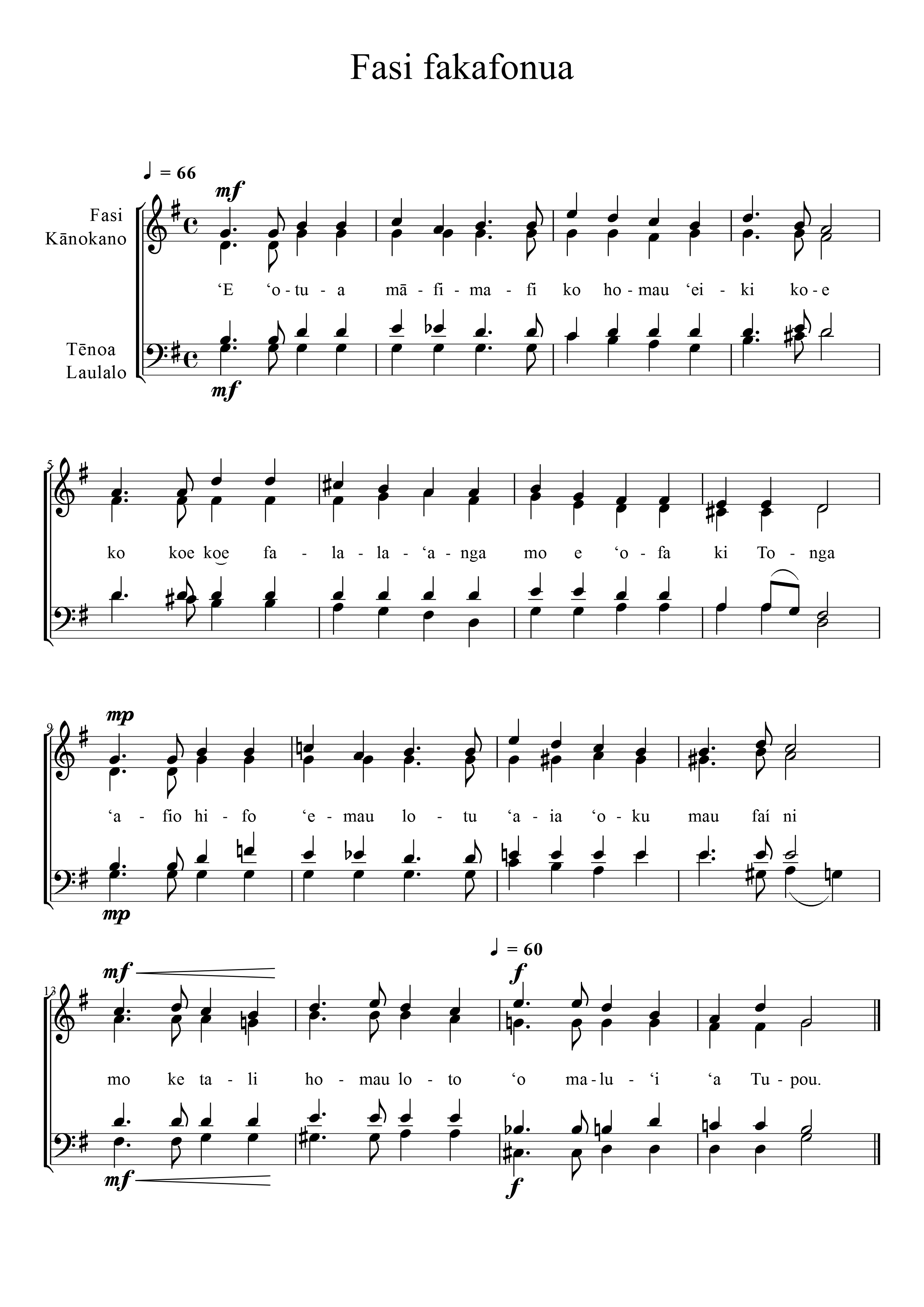
- National anthem of Tonga
- Also known as: Fasi fakafonua (English: National Song); Ko e fasi ʻo e kuini ʻo e ʻOtu Tonga (when the monarch is female) (English: Song of the Queen of the Tonga Islands)
- Lyrics: Uelingatoni Ngū Tupoumalohi
- Music: Carl Gustav Schmitt
- Adopted: 1874

Audio sample
- A cappella choral vocal recording (1961): file; help

"Ko e fasi ʻo e tuʻi ʻo e ʻOtu Tonga" (pronounced [ko e fasi ʔo e tuʔi ʔo e ʔotu toŋa]; alternatively "Ko e fasi ʻo e kuini ʻo e ʻOtu Tonga" when the Tongan monarch is female) is the national anthem of Tonga. The title literally means "Song of the King of the Tonga Islands" or "Song of the Queen of the Tonga Islands" (when the monarch is female) in the Tongan language but is in daily life better known as "Fasi fakafonua", which translates to "National Song". The lyrics of the anthem were written by Tongan Prince Uelingatoni Ngū Tupoumalohi, with the music by German-born New Zealand composer Carl Gustav Schmitt. It was first used in 1874.

== Lyrics ==
Tongan lyrics (modern spelling)

ʻE ʻOtua māfimafi
Ko homau ʻeiki koe
Ko koe ko e falalaʻanga
Mo e ʻofa ki Tonga;
ʻAfio hifo ʻemau lotu
ʻAia ʻoku mau faí ni
Mo ke tali homau loto
ʻO maluʻi ʻa Tupou.

IPA transcription (Note: See Help:IPA, Tongan language § Alphabet and Tongan language § Phonology.)

[ʔe ʔo.tu.a maː.fi.ma.fi]
[ko ho.mau̯ ʔei̯.ki ko.e]
[ko koe̯ ko‿e fa.la.la.ʔa.ŋa]
[mo e ʔo.fa ki to.ŋa]
[ʔa.fio̯ hi.fo ʔe.mau̯ lo.tu]
[ʔai̯.a ʔo.ku mau̯ fai̯ ni]
[mo ke ta.li ho.mau̯ lo.to]
[ʔo ma.lu.ʔi ʔa tu.pou̯]

Literal English translation

Oh, almighty God!
You are our Lord,
It is You, the pillar
And the love to Tonga.
Look down on our prayer
That is what we do now
And may You answer our wish
To protect Tupou.

English lyrics

Oh almighty God above
Thou art our Lord and sure defence
As your people, we trust Thee
And our Tonga Thou dost love
Hear our prayer for Thou unseen
We know that Thou hast blessed our land
Grant our earnest supplication
Guard and save Tupou, our king (queen).

== Music notation ==
The music in Western music notation and the tuʻungafasi, or Tongan music notation:

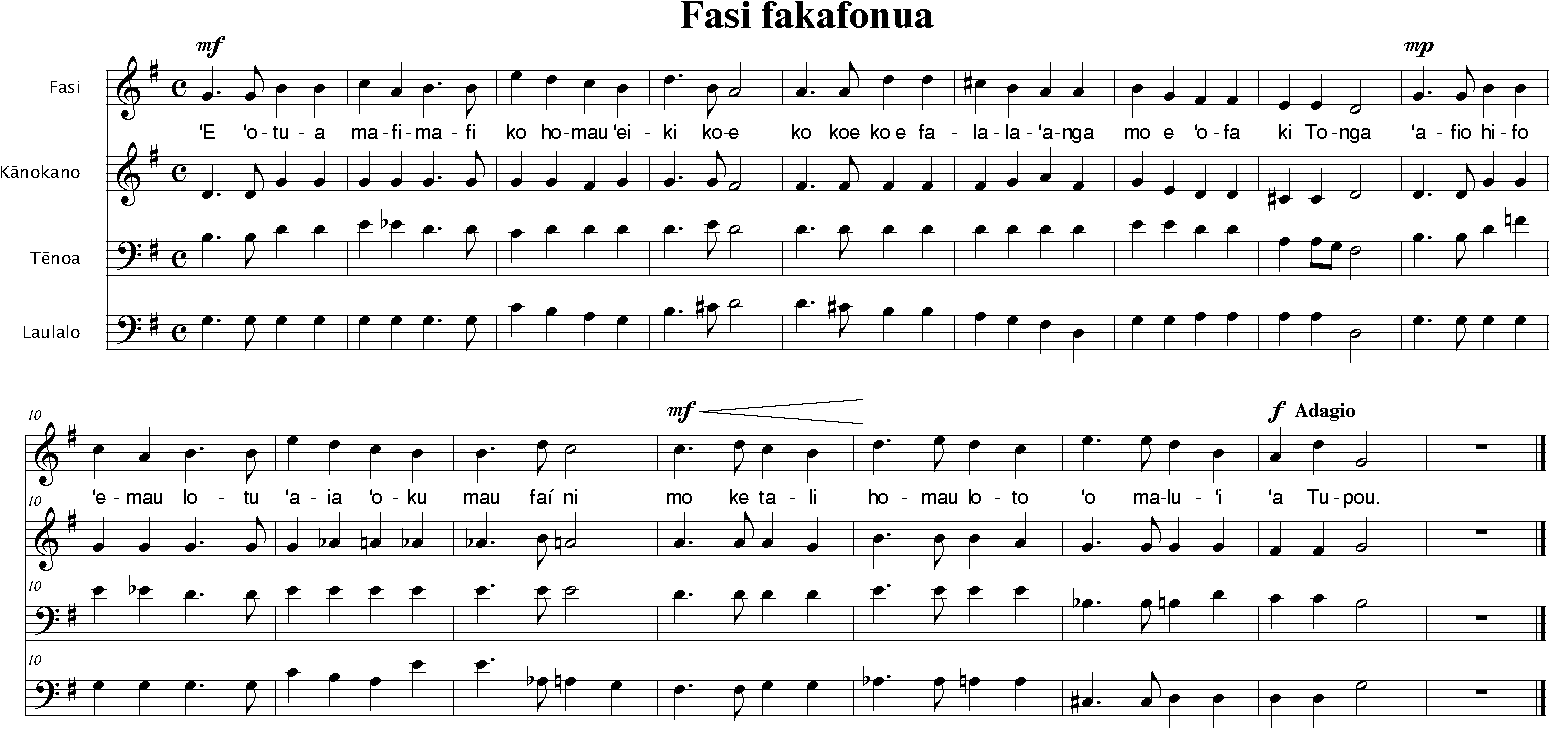
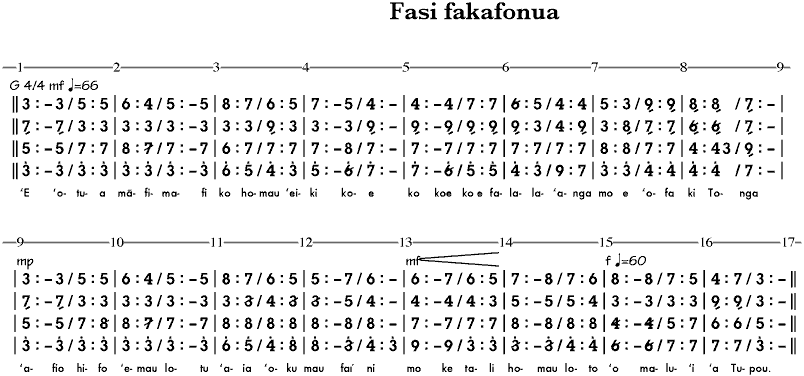
