= 1898 in New Zealand =

- Decades: 1870s; 1880s; 1890s; 1900s; 1910s
- See also: History of New Zealand; List of years in New Zealand; Timeline of New Zealand history

The following lists events that happened during 1898 in New Zealand.

== Incumbents ==
=== Regal and viceregal ===
- Head of State – Queen Victoria
- Governor – The Earl of Ranfurly GCMG

=== Government and law ===
The 13th New Zealand Parliament continues with the Liberal Party in power.

- Speaker of the House – Sir Maurice O'Rorke
- Prime Minister – Richard Seddon
- Minister of Finance – Richard Seddon
- Chief Justice – Hon Sir James Prendergast

=== Parliamentary opposition ===
Leader of the Opposition – William Russell.

=== Main centre leaders ===
- Mayor of Auckland – Peter Dignan followed by David Goldie
- Mayor of Christchurch – Walter Cooper followed by Charles Louisson
- Mayor of Dunedin – Edward Bowes Cargill followed by William Swan
- Mayor of Wellington – John Rutherfurd Blair

== Events ==
- 1 December: W H Bartlett films the opening of the Auckland Industrial and Mining Exhibition. The film is screened on Christmas Eve at Bartlett's studio – the first public screening of a New Zealand film.
- Bell Tea is founded.

== Sport ==
=== Athletics ===
National Champions, Men:

- 100 yards – George Smith (Auckland)
- 250 yards – Alfred J. Patrick (Wellington)
- 440 yards – R. Oliphant (Auckland)
- 880 yards – H. C. Garsia (Canterbury)
- 1 mile – S. Pentecost (Canterbury)
- 3 miles – S. Pentecost (Canterbury)
- 120 yards hurdles – Arthur H. Holder (Wanganui)
- 440 yards hurdles – George Smith (Auckland)
- Long jump – Alan Good (Wanganui)
- High jump – Hugh Good (Wanganui)
- Pole vault – Hori Eruera (Auckland)
- Shot put – Hugh Good (Wanganui)
- Hammer throw – J. Skinner (Auckland)

=== Chess ===
National Champion:

1. R.J. Barnes of Wellington. (Played over new year 1897/98)
2. R.A. Cleland of Dunedin (played December 1898)

=== Golf ===
The National Amateur Championships were held in Christchurch

- Men – W. Pryde (Hutt)
- Women – K. Rattray (Otago)

=== Horse racing ===
==== Harness racing ====
- Auckland Trotting Cup (over 2 miles) is won by Duke C.

==== Thoroughbred racing ====
- New Zealand Cup – Tirant D’eau
- New Zealand Derby – Altair
- Auckland Cup – Uhlan - the first horse-race to be filmed in New Zealand
- Wellington Cup – Uniform

==== Season leaders (1897/98) ====
- Top New Zealand stakes earner – Multiform
- Leading flat jockey – W. Brown

=== Lawn Bowls ===
National Champions

- Singles – W. McIlwrick (Dunedin)
- Pairs – C. Nicholson and W. McLaren (skip) (Kaitangata)
- Fours – W. Cowie, C. Fynmore, M. Sinclair and A. Gillies (skip) (Dunedin)

=== Polo ===
- Savile Cup winners – Oroua

=== Rowing ===
National Champions (Men)

- Single sculls – J. McGrath (Otago)
- Double sculls – Otago
- Coxless pairs – Wellington
- Coxed fours – Picton

=== Rugby union ===
Provincial club rugby champions include:

see also Category:Rugby union in New Zealand

=== Shooting ===
Ballinger Belt – Private J. McGregor (Oamaru Rifles)

=== Soccer ===
Provincial league champions:

- Auckland: Auckland United
- Otago: Wakari Dunedin
- Wellington: Wellington Rovers

=== Swimming ===
National champions (Men)

- 100 yards freestyle – A. Truscott (Canterbury)
- 440 yards freestyle – C. Rich (Canterbury)

=== Tennis ===
National champions

- Men's singles – J. Hooper
- Women's singles – Kathleen Nunneley
- Men's doubles – H. Parker and C. Gore
- Women's doubles – Kathleen Nunneley and E. Kennedy

== Births ==
- 8 October: George Davidson, Olympic sprinter.

== Deaths ==
- 2 January: John Cargill, politician (born 1821).
- 3 May: John Kerr, politician (born 1830).
- 29 June: Charles Parker, politician (born 1809).
- 15 July: Francis Dillon Bell, politician (born 1822).
- 31 October: William Gilbert Rees, explorer and settler (born 1827).
- 25 November: William Downie Stewart, politician (born 1842).
- 29 November: Thomas Forsaith, politician (born 1814).

== See also ==
- List of years in New Zealand
- Timeline of New Zealand history
- History of New Zealand
- Military history of New Zealand
- Timeline of the New Zealand environment
- Timeline of New Zealand's links with Antarctica
