= Nora Sipos =

New Zealand businesswoman, humanitarian and welfare worker

Eleonora Vera Sipos (7 September 1900– 5 August 1988) was a New Zealand businesswoman, humanitarian and welfare worker. She was born in Cernovice, Bohemia in 1900, but known in New Zealand as Nora Sipos.
