= Agnes Harrold =

Hotel manager, foster parent, nurse, midwife

Agnes Harrold (c. 1831 – 7 July 1903) was a New Zealand hotel manager, foster parent, nurse and midwife.

== Biography ==
She was born near Hudson Bay, Canada circa 1831. Born Agnes Grieve, she married near Hudson Bay, coming to Stewart Island in 1861 where she ran a hotel "The Travellers Rest" while her husband was at sea. In the small community of 2 to 300, she was the unofficial doctor.
