= James McPherson (cricketer) =

Australian cricketer

Personal information
- Born: 20 November 1842; Moonee Ponds, Colony of New South Wales
- Died: 23 August 1891 (aged 48); Melbourne, Australia

Domestic team information
- Years: Team
- 1866: Victoria
- Source: Cricinfo, 3 May 2015

James McPherson (20 November 1842 – 23 August 1891) was an Australian cricketer. He played one first-class cricket match for Victoria in 1866.

== See also ==
- List of Victoria first-class cricketers
