= Alan Stuart Paterson =

Cartoonist, illustrator, museum and art gallery curator (1902–1968)

Alan Stuart Paterson (24 January 1902 – 16 June 1968) was a New Zealand cartoonist, illustrator, museum and art gallery curator. He was born in Hāwera, Taranaki, New Zealand in 1902.
