= Tamati Ngakaho =

New Zealand Ngāti Porou carver

Tamati Ngakaho (died 1904) was a New Zealand carver of the Ngāti Porou iwi. Ngakaho hailed from Rākaihoea near Waiomatatini on New Zealand's East Coast. His parents were Hāmure and Huirōhutu. Despite the scarcity of detailed records about his life, Ngākaho is renowned for his mastery of the Iwirākau carving style that emerged in the region during the sixteenth century.

Ngākaho is especially noted for his contributions to Porourangi, the meeting house at the Waiomatatini Marae. The marae is depicted on the New Zealand fifty-dollar note. The timber for this house was originally cut in 1865 for a different project that was abandoned due to the East Cape Wars.
