= Sophia Ann Bates =

New Zealand teacher and postmistress

Sophia Ann Bates (6 March 1817 – 28 November 1899) was a New Zealand teacher and postmistress. She was born in London, London, England on 6 March 1817.
