= 1901 New Zealand Royal Visit Honours =

Awards list for New Zealand

1901 Royal Visit Honours
- Previous: 1901 New Year Honours; Next: 1901 King's Birthday Honours
- Type: New Zealand royal honours: Order of St Michael and St George
- Date: 19 June 1901
- Country: New Zealand
- Total recipients: 6

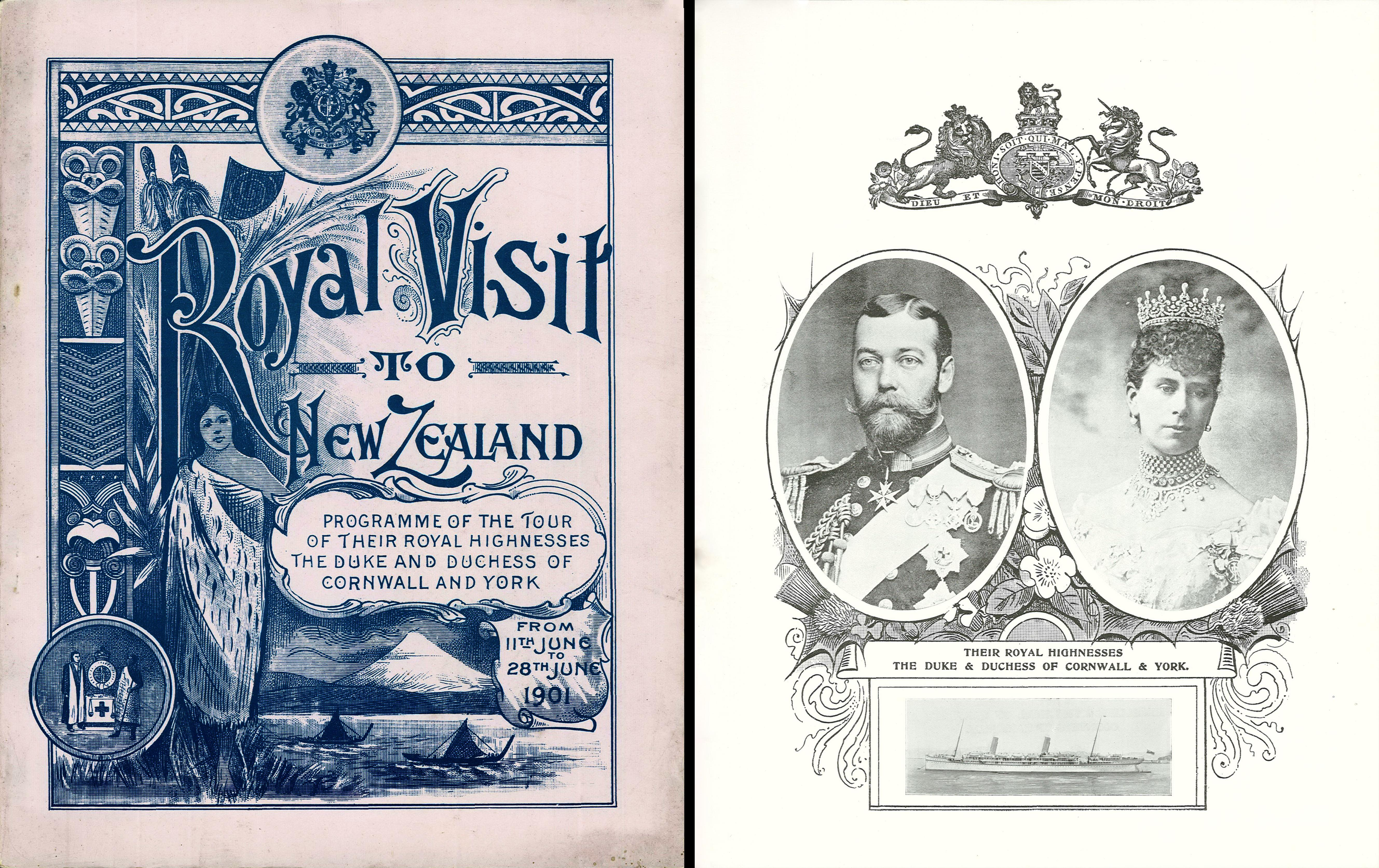
Official souvenir booklet of the visit of the Duke and Duchess of Cornwall and York to New Zealand in 1901

The 1901 New Zealand Royal Visit Honours were appointments by Edward VII of New Zealanders to the Order of St Michael and St George, to mark the visit of the Duke and Duchess of Cornwall and York to New Zealand that year. They were announced on 19 June 1901.

The recipients of honours are listed here as they were styled before their new honour.

== Order of St Michael and St George ==
=== Knight Grand Cross (GCMG) ===
- The Right Honourable The Earl of Ranfurly KCMG – Governor and Commander-in-Chief of the Colony of New Zealand.
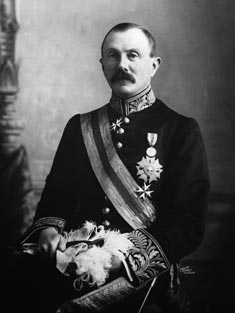
Lord Ranfurly

=== Knight Commander (KCMG) ===
- The Honourable Joseph George Ward – Postmaster-General.
- The Honourable John McKenzie – late Minister of Lands.
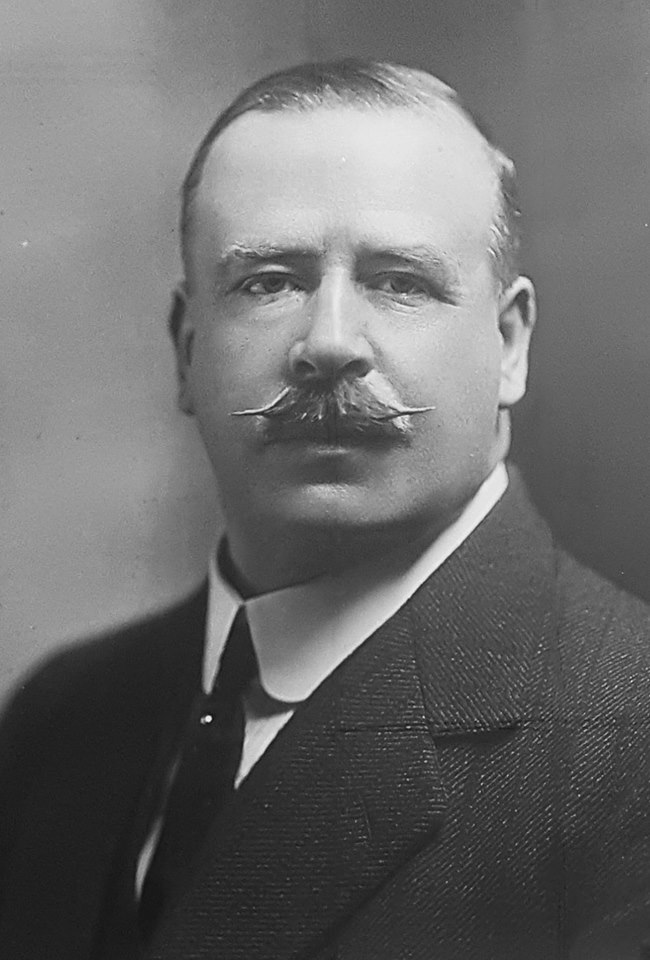
Sir Joseph Ward

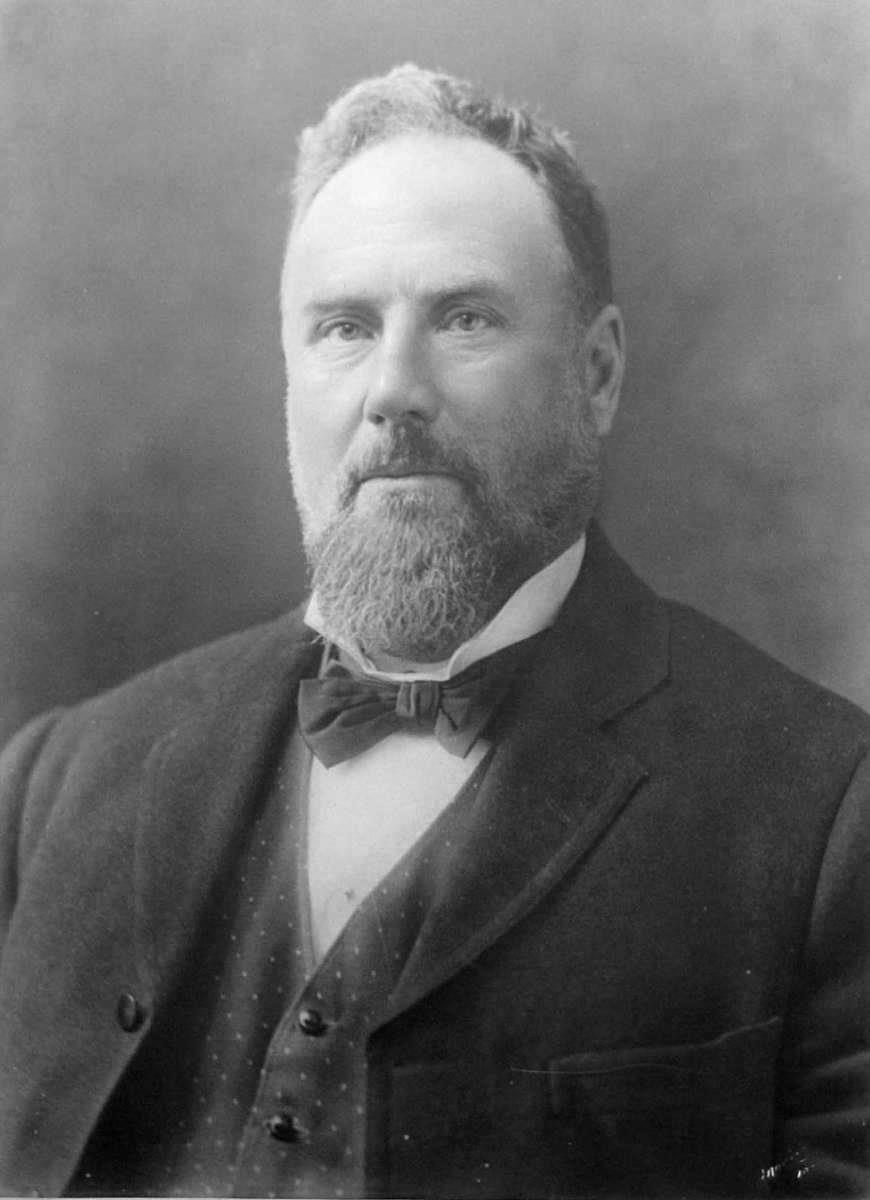
Sir John McKenzie

=== Companion (CMG) ===
- The Honourable Alfred Jerome Cadman – late Minister for Railways.
- The Honourable William Campbell Walker – Minister of Education.
- Lieutenant-Colonel Walter Edward Gudgeon – British Resident at Rarotonga, in the Cook Islands.
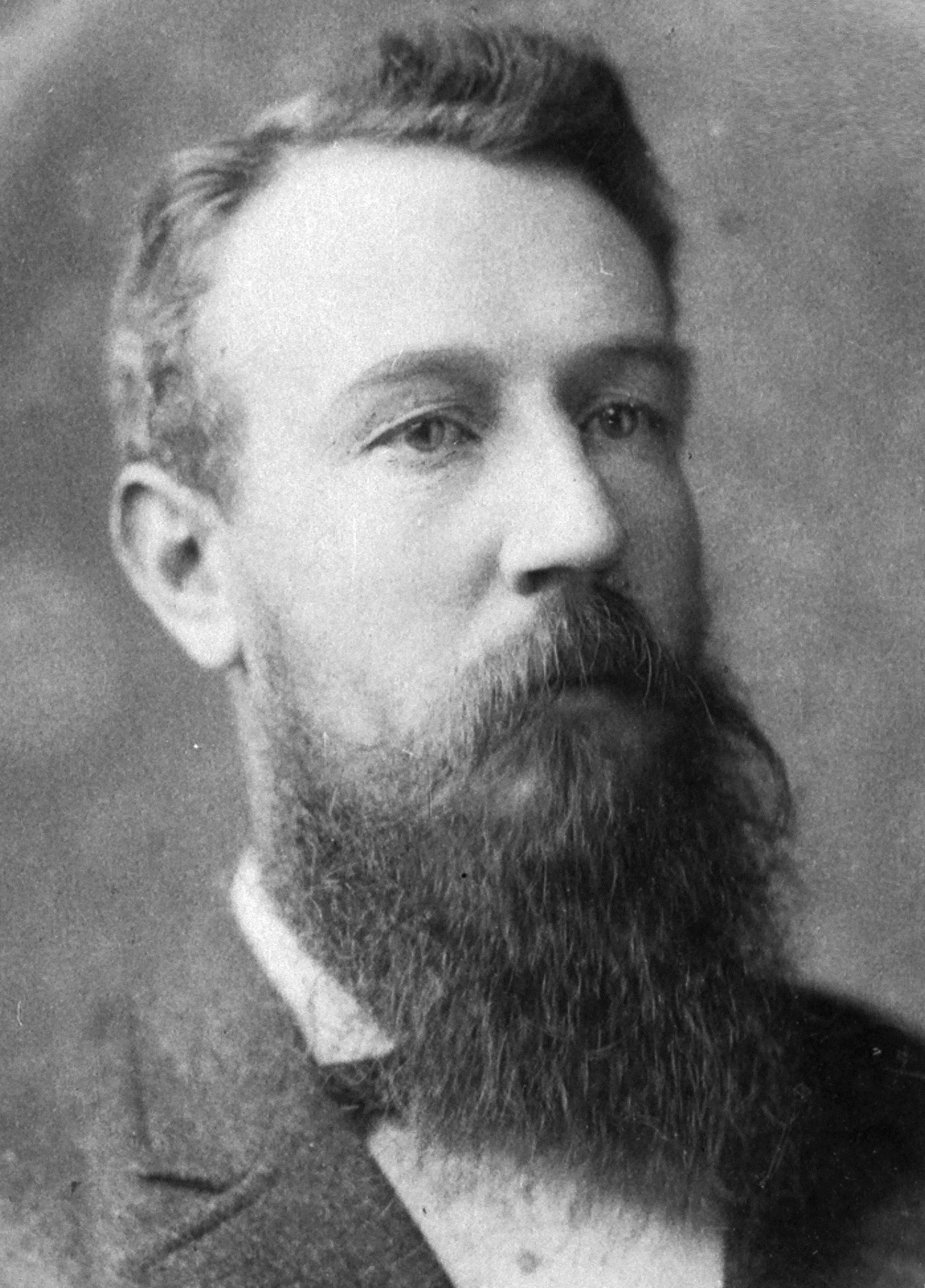
Alfred Cadman

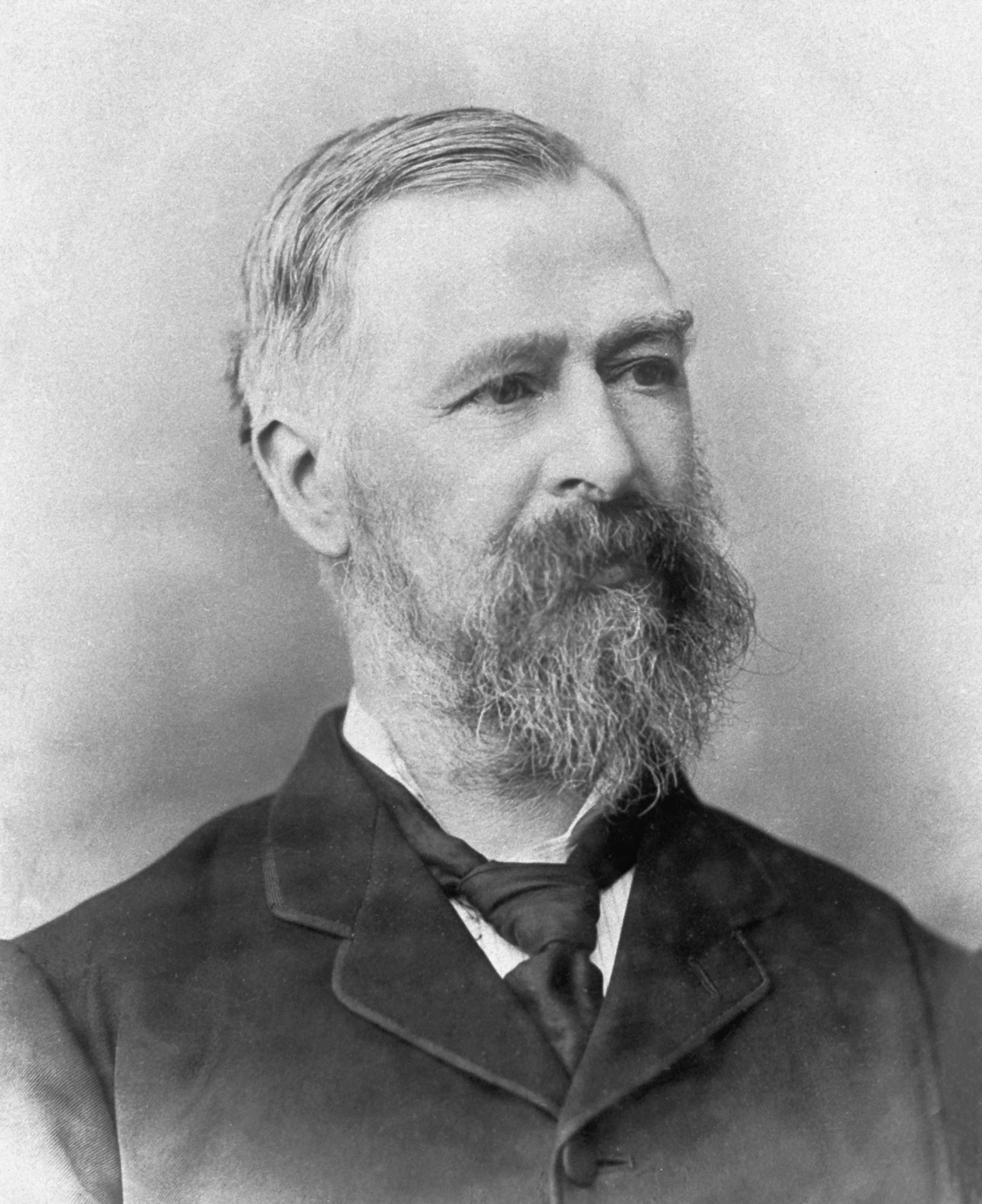
William Campbell Walker

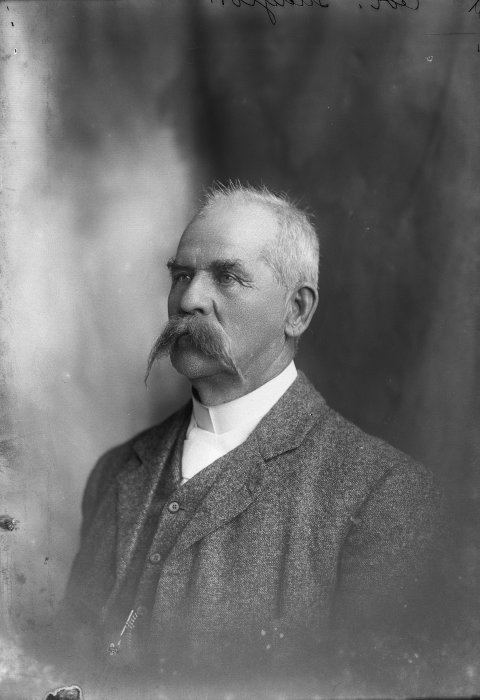
Walter Gudgeon
