= Esther James =

New Zealand entrepreneur

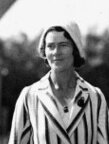
- James in 1932
- Born: 5 November 1900; Pahiatua, New Zealand
- Died: 7 January 1990 (aged 89); Auckland, New Zealand
- Occupations: Entrepreneur, fashion model, architect and property developer
- Relatives: George Stoddart Whitmore (great-grandfather)

Esther Marion Pretoria James (5 November 1900 – 7 January 1990) was an entrepreneur, architectural student, model and author. She once walked the length of New Zealand to raise awareness of New Zealand-made goods.

== Career ==
=== Architect ===
James completed her articles under the tutelage of William Arthur Cumming in the 1920s. As Cumming lectured at the University, James would go along to his classes. James was passionate about designing residential properties, specifically to reduce unnecessary labour for domestic women. She also provided assistance to Cumming in measuring sites and architectural work on shops, offices, and schools. She was particularly active on sites on Karangahape Road, supervising the construction of Flackson's dress shop. James stopped working for Cumming upon marrying architect Leslie Haysom in 1924.

While her husband was away in the Second World War, James purchased land in Tauranga and built a house, saying she made 4000 concrete bricks. The sale of that property gave her profits and she went on to build a larger house in Remuera, Auckland. James claimed to have built 10 houses in the seven following years and there are records of 12 sections sold under her name between 1946 and 1948.

=== Modelling ===
James was one of New Zealand's first professional fashion models and a keen supporter of "buy New Zealand-made." James modelled for Flackson's on Karangahape Road, of which she had helped build whilst working for Cumming. James walked the length of New Zealand in 1931–32 to raise awareness of New Zealand-made goods and improve trade during the depression. She was the first person to do this walk from Spirits Bay to Stewart Island and wore only New Zealand-made clothing and shoes. The walk took six months. She also walked from Melbourne to Brisbane in Australia to promote tourism to New Zealand to Australians.

=== Writing ===
James wrote a best-selling autobiography titled Jobbing Along published in Christchurch in 1965 by Whitcombe & Tombs.

=== Politics ===
In 1969 she was promoting herself as a candidate for a new political party the Independent Women's Party. She said:

A women spends, on average, 25 years of her married life in her home - without praise or pay. Then her husband can take her matrimonial home away from her.' (Esther James 1969)

Appearing in a newspaper article promoting the party, James was described as a "...non-practising architect who has designed five houses for herself in Auckland."

=== Activism ===
Esther was the first woman to walk alone from Spirits Bay to Stewart Island in 1931–1932, to promoted New Zealand-made products, she wore New Zealand-made clothes and ate local food during her six-month walk. She then walked from Melbourne to Brisbane, promoting New Zealand goods, a distance of 1200 miles, she also lectured on New Zealand's tourist attractions.

== Family ==
James was from Pahiatua, New Zealand. She grew up on a farm and was one of the younger of ten siblings. Her father was a bridge engineer so her childhood was disrupted with constant moving.

In 1924, James married her first husband Leslie Haysom. They divorced in 1935, and James lost all her assets including 'the family home-and-income property she had built in the mid-1920s with the proceeds of her earlier land deals'.

In 1937, James married Edward Julian. She had two children while her husband was in the army. He did not approve of her entrepreneurialism and was controlling of their finances. This was not a happy marriage and they divorced in 1971.

The soldier and member of the New Zealand Legislative Council, George Stoddart Whitmore (1829–1903), was her great-grandfather.

== Death ==
James died on 7 January 1990, aged 89. She is buried at Purewa Cemetery.
