= Henry Ah Kew =

Lawyer, community leader

Henry Ah Kew (22 September 1900 – 19 January 1966) was a New Zealand lawyer and community leader. He was born in Auckland, New Zealand, on 22 September 1900.

In 1953, Ah Kew was awarded the Queen Elizabeth II Coronation Medal.
