= Mary Gabriel Gill =

Catholic prioress

Mary Gabriel Gill (22 June 1837 – 22 April 1905) was a New Zealand catholic prioress. She was born in Dublin, County Dublin, Ireland on 22 June 1837.
