= George Lyon Denniston =

Mayor of Dunedin and New Zealand civic leader

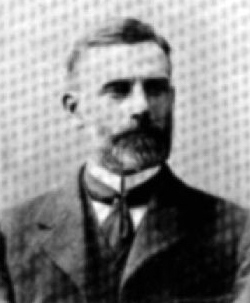
- Denniston during his term as Mayor of Dunedin, c. 1902

26th Mayor of Dunedin
- In office 1901–1902
- Preceded by: Robert Chisholm
- Succeeded by: James Alexander Park

Personal details
- Born: 1846 Glasgow, Scotland
- Died: July 12, 1934 (aged 87–88) Dunedin, New Zealand
- Spouse: Mary Reynolds (m. 1878)
- Profession: Businessman, civic leader

George Lyon Denniston (1846 – July 12, 1934) was a New Zealand businessman and local politician. He served as the mayor of Dunedin from 1901 to 1902. He was a prominent figure in Dunedin's commercial and civic life during the late nineteenth and early twentieth centuries.

== Early life and education ==
Denniston was born in Glasgow, Scotland on 1846. He was educated at schools in Glasgow and Greenock later attending Blair Lodge Academy. In 1862, he emigrated with his family to New Zealand. He initially worked in farming before settling permanently in Dunedin.

== Business career ==
Denniston became managing director of the firm Neill and Co. in 1882 where he held this position until 1893. After leaving Neill and Co. he established his own business interests in Dunedin. He served as a director of the Westport Coal Company and the Otago Daily Times Company. He also served for many years as trustee and chairman of the Dunedin Savings Bank.

In 1899, Denniston was appointed Belgian consul for Otago. He was subsequently appointed a Chevalier of the Order of the Crown of Belgium.

== Political and civic career ==
Denniston was elected to the Dunedin City Council in 1897. He served on the council until 1900.

In 1901, he was elected Mayor of Dunedin where he served a single term, leaving office in 1902. During his mayoralty, he presided over civic events associated with the 1901 royal visit of the Duke and Duchess of Cornwall and York.

== Personal life ==
Denniston married Mary Reynolds in Dunedin in 1878. The family was active in Dunedin's social and civic life.

== Death ==
George Lyon Denniston died in Dunedin on July 12, 1934, aged 87.
