= Carl Schmitt (composer) =

New Zealand musician and composer

Carl Gustav Schmitt (9 December 1837 – 22 March 1900) was a New Zealand violinist, composer, conductor and university professor. He was born in Frankfurt am Main in about 1833.

He lectured on music at the Auckland University College.

He composed over 1500 violin concertos throughout his career. He is also responsible for composing the national anthem of Tonga, "Ko e fasi ʻo e tuʻi ʻo e ʻOtu Tonga", where he had written the music set to lyrics written by ʻUelingatoni Ngū Tupoumalohi, the second Crown Prince of the island kingdom at the time.

Schmitt died on 22 March 1900 in Clevedon, New Zealand.

His only daughter, Ethel Mildred Schmitt, married Auckland barrister Fred Earl in 1890, but died two years later aged 20.
