= Geoffrey Michael William Hodgkins =

New Zealand naturalist

Geoffrey Michael William Hodgkins (1 May 1902 – 27 October 1965) was a New Zealand naturalist. He was born in Dunedin, New Zealand on 1 May 1902. He was a grandson and nephew respectively of New Zealand artists W. M. Hodgkins and Frances Hodgkins.
