= Benjamin Crisp =

New Zealand bullock driver and temperance reformer

Benjamin Crisp (11 May 1808 – 2 September 1901) was a New Zealand temperance advocate.

== Early life ==
Crisp was born in London on or about 11 May 1808; his parents were Benjamin Crisp, a tinsmith, and his wife, Sophia.

== Life ==
In 1819, when he was 11, he travelled to Hobart. After living in Hobart, Adelaide, and Sydney and working as a whaler, a farm worker, and a bullock driver, in 1837 he left Australia for New Zealand, where he again worked as a whaler and then became a boatman at Port Nicholson. In 1842 he moved to Port Nelson, where he went into business with Sam Phelps, using a bullock cart to carry immigrants' luggage into town from the port. The two earned enough to work only in the mornings; they spent the afternoons drinking, then slept off the effects under the cart. On one occasion Crisp was so drunk, he walked off the wharf thinking he was on a bridge. Crisp was one of the earliest settlers in Nelson and trained the first pair of bullocks used as draught animals in the area. He was later employed as a carter by local businesses.

Alfred Saunders, the founder of the Nelson Temperance Society, preached temperance from Phelps' and Crisp's cart on Sundays. In June 1843, Crisp decided to renounce alcohol and visited Saunders at 4 a.m. to sign the temperance pledge. He became an important spokesperson for the movement, founded a Band of Hope for the local children that drew 500 to welcome important visitors to Nelson, and organised a popular annual children's event on Queen Victoria's birthday. He also taught Sunday school at the Wesleyan church.

On the Queen's Diamond Jubilee in 1887, Crisp was awarded a gold medal and 60 sovereigns.

== Personal life and death ==
Crisp married Elizabeth Burnett on 14 December 1846; they had five sons and five daughters, whom Crisp brought to temperance meetings to display how they were thriving in a sober home. He died in Nelson on 2 September 1901, aged 93, after injuring his back in a fall, and was given a public funeral. His headstone is inscribed: "Erected by the Nelson citizens in memory of Ben Crisp who was the children's friend".
