= James Anderson McPherson =

New Zealand horticulturist, horticultural administrator, and writer

James Anderson McPherson (3 June 1900–18 February 1980) was a New Zealand horticulturist, horticultural administrator and writer. He was born in Dunedin, New Zealand on 3 June 1900.
