= James Alexander Park =

Mayor of Dunedin, New Zealand

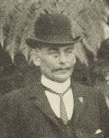
- James Alexander Park at the 1902 New Zealand Municipal Conference in Wellington.

27th Mayor of Dunedin
- In office 1902–1903
- Preceded by: George Lyon Denniston
- Succeeded by: Thomas Scott

Personal details
- Born: 1854 Edinburgh, Scotland
- Died: 1928 (aged 73–74) Dunedin, New Zealand
- Spouse: Margaret Dunbar Ross
- Children: 12
- Profession: Auctioneer, estate agent

James Alexander Park (1854 – 1928) was a New Zealand businessman and local politician who served as Mayor of Dunedin from 1902 to 1903.

== Early life ==
Park was born in 1854 in Edinburgh, Scotland, he spent part of his early life in Tasmania before moving to Dunedin in 1863.

== Business career ==
He worked as an auctioneer and estate agent in Dunedin where he was associated with established firms and active in the city's commercial life.

== Political career ==
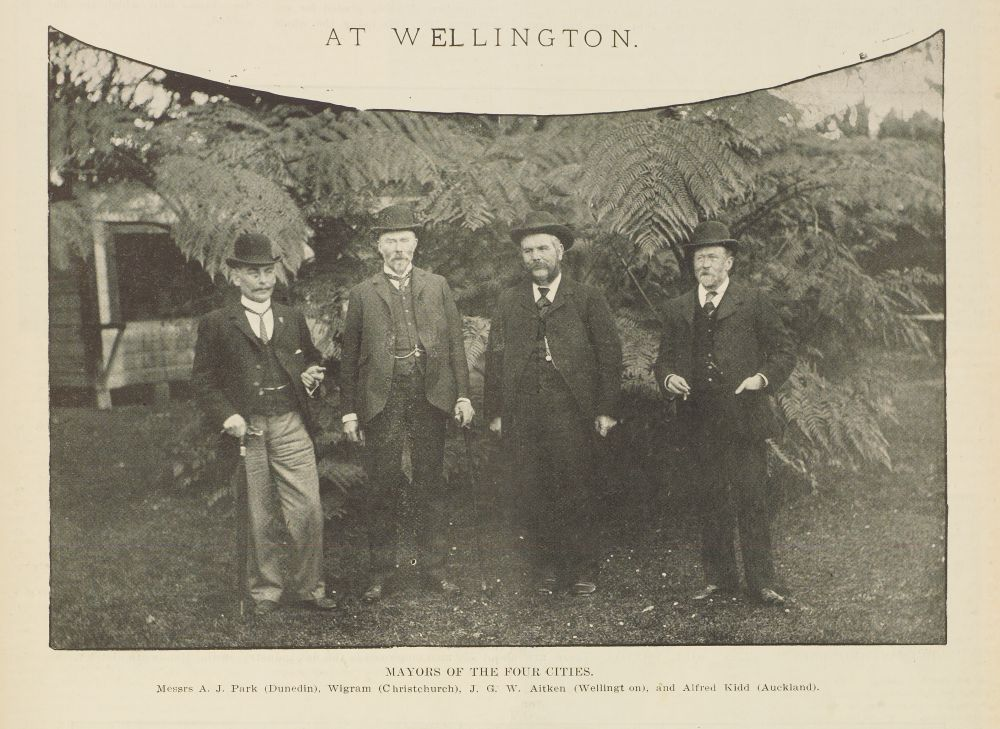
The mayors of New Zealand's four main centres at the 1902 Municipal Conference in Wellington. Left to right: James Alexander Park (Dunedin), Henry Wigram (Christchurch), John Aitken (Wellington), and Alfred Kidd (Auckland).

Park served on the Dunedin City Council before his election as mayor. He held office from 1902 to 1903, following George Lyon Denniston and preceding Thomas Scott.

== Personal life ==
In 1880 Park married Margaret Dunbar Ross with whom he had twelve children. His wife was noted for her involvement in women's suffrage activities in New Zealand.

== Death ==
Park died in Dunedin in 1928, age 74.
