= Robert Chisholm (mayor) =

Joiner and mayor in Dunedin, New Zealand

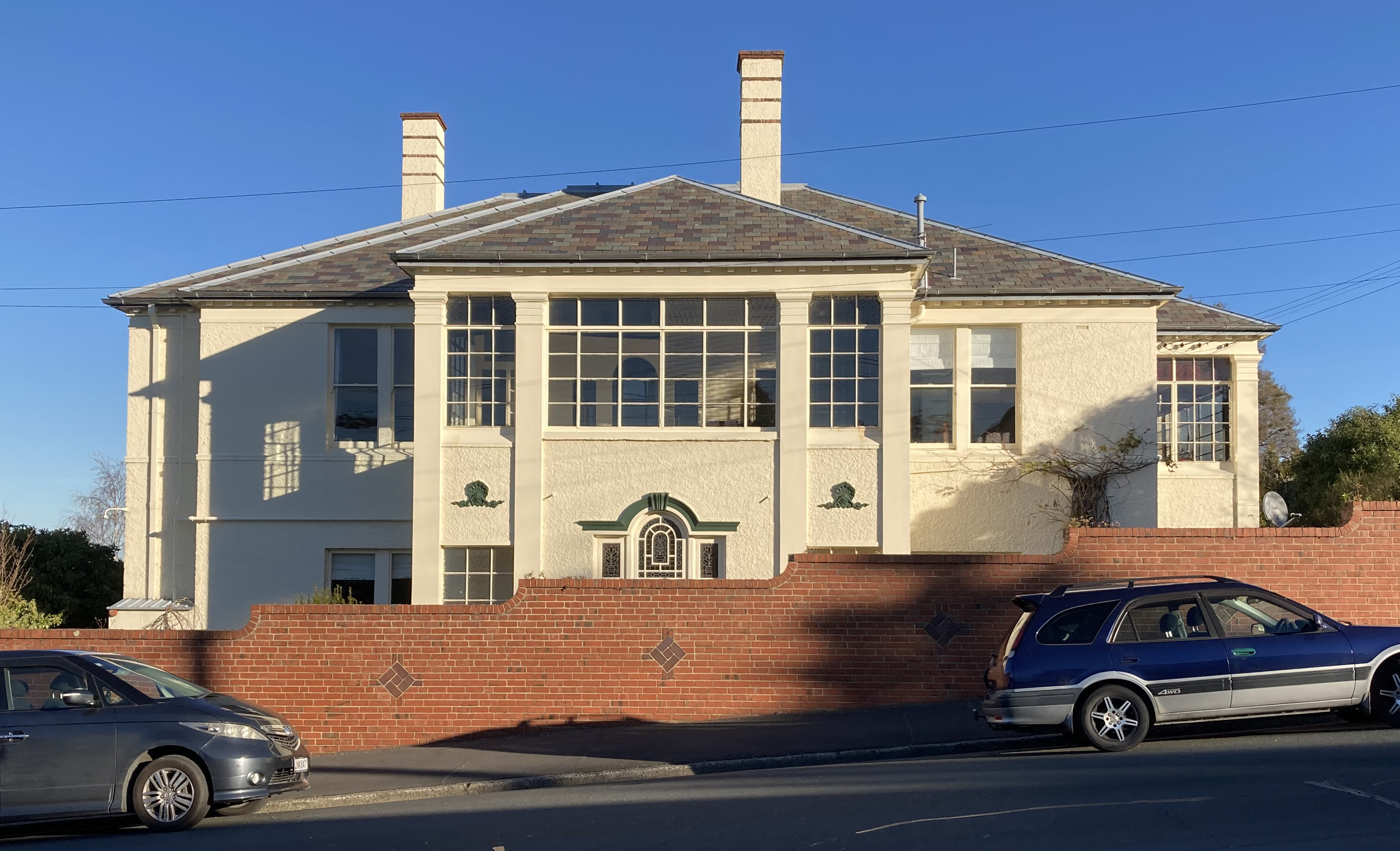
Chisholm House, Ross Street, Dunedin

Robert Chisholm (15 July 1843 – 19 June 1914) was born in Scotlandwell, Kinross-shire on 15 July 1843. He arrived in Port Chalmers in 1858, where he spent his first two years as a cowherd. Chisholm then worked as a carpenter, before opening a joinery workshop, known as Scoullar and Chisholm Ltd, with Arthur Scoullar. The firm had premises on Rattray Street.

Chisholm was Mayor of Roslyn borough from 1881 to 1884 before becoming Mayor of Dunedin from 1899 to 1901. He also served on the Dunedin City Council. His residence Chisholm House still stands at 45 Ross Street, Dunedin. Chisholm was managing director of Scoullar and Chisholm. He died in Roslyn in 1914 and is buried in a family plot in Dunedin's Southern Cemetery.

Chisholm was married to a Miss Thomson, and had four children.

Chisholm Park Golf Course was named after him.
