= Electoral history of Joseph Ward =

List of elections featuring Joseph Ward as a candidate

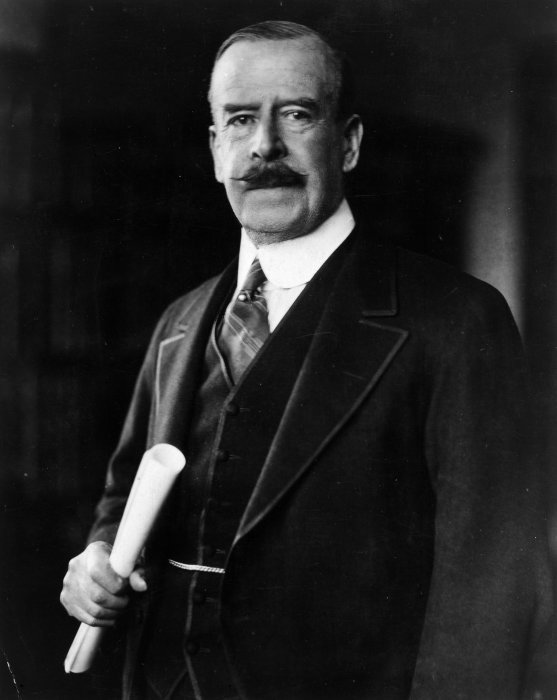
Sir Joseph Ward, 1928

This is a summary of the electoral history of Sir Joseph Ward, Prime Minister of New Zealand, (1906–12; 1928–30) Leader of the Liberal Party (1906–12; 1913–19; 1928–30) and Member of Parliament for Awarua (1887–1919) and Invercargill (1925–1930).

== Parliamentary elections ==
=== 1887 election ===
General election, 1887: Awarua
Party	Candidate	Votes	%	±%
Independent	Joseph Ward	660	50.84	
Independent	George Froggatt	401	30.89	
Independent	James Walker Bain	237	18.25	
Majority		259	19.95	
Turnout		1,298	62.46	
Registered electors		2,078		

=== 1890 election ===
General election, 1890: Awarua
Party	Candidate	Votes	%	±%
Liberal	Joseph Ward	Unopposed		
Registered electors		2,158		

=== 1893 election ===
General election, 1893: Awarua
Party	Candidate	Votes	%	±%
Liberal	Joseph Ward	Unopposed		
Registered electors		3,129		

=== 1896 election ===
General election, 1896: Awarua
Party	Candidate	Votes	%	±%
Liberal	Joseph Ward	1,836	63.60	
Conservative	Cuthbert Cowan	1,051	36.40	
Turnout		2,887	72.68	
Majority		785	27.19	
Registered electors		3,887		

=== 1897 by-election ===
1897 Awarua by-election
Party	Candidate	Votes	%	±%
Liberal	Joseph Ward	2,066	69.42	+5.82
Conservative	Cuthbert Cowan	910	30.58	−5.82
Turnout		2,976		
Majority		1,156	38.84	+11.65

=== 1899 election ===
General election, 1899: Awarua
Party	Candidate	Votes	%	±%
Liberal	Joseph Ward	2,417	77.92	+14.06
Conservative	W. T. Murray	685	22.08	
Majority		1,732	55.83	+28.12
Turnout		3,102	76.37	
Registered electors		4,062		

=== 1902 election ===
General election, 1902: Awarua
Party	Candidate	Votes	%	±%
Liberal	Sir Joseph Ward	2,795	75.37	−2.55
Independent	David Whyte	913	24.63	
Majority		1,882	50.75	
Turnout		3,708	76.69	+0.32
Registered electors		4,835		

=== 1905 election ===
General election, 1905: Awarua
Party	Candidate	Votes	%	±%
Liberal	Sir Joseph Ward	3,586	81.68	+6.31
Independent	Henry Woodnorth	738	16.82	
Informal votes		66	1.50	
Majority		2,848	64.87	+14.12
Turnout		4,390	83.39	−6.70
Registered electors		5,264		

=== 1908 election ===
General election, 1908: Awarua, First ballot
Party	Candidate	Votes	%	±%
Liberal	Sir Joseph Ward	3,069	64.92	−16.76
Independent	William Morris	886	18.74	
Conservative	Alfred Snowball	595	12.58	
Informal votes		177	3.74	+2.24
Majority		2,183	46.18	−18.69
Turnout		4,727	81.65	−1.74
Registered electors		5,789		

=== 1911 election ===
General election, 1911: Awarua, First ballot
Party	Candidate	Votes	%	±%
Liberal	Sir Joseph Ward	2,893	53.65	−11.27
Reform	John Hamilton	2,265	42.01	
Independent	William Morris	152	2.81	−15.93
Informal votes		82	1.52	−2.22
Majority		628	11.64	−34.18
Turnout		5,392	86.71	+5.06
Registered electors		6,218		

=== 1914 election ===
General election, 1914: Awarua
Party	Candidate	Votes	%	±%
Liberal	Sir Joseph Ward	3,132	62.16	+8.51
Reform	John Hamilton	1,906	37.83	−4.18
Informal votes		34	0.67	+0.85
Majority		1,226	24.33	+12.69
Turnout		5,038	83.03	+3.68
Registered electors		6,067		

=== 1919 election ===
General election, 1919: Awarua
Party	Candidate	Votes	%	±%
Reform	John Hamilton	3,164	55.99	+18.16
Liberal	Sir Joseph Ward	2,407	42.59	−19.57
Informal votes		80	1.41	+0.74
Majority		757	13.39	
Turnout		5,651	81.46	+1.57
Registered electors		6,937		

=== 1923 by-election ===
1923 Tauranga by-election
Party	Candidate	Votes	%	±%
Reform	Charles Macmillan	4,360	57.41	
Liberal	Sir Joseph Ward	3,235	42.59	
Informal votes		35	0.46	
Majority		1,125	14.81	
Turnout		7,630	85.53	
Registered electors		8,921		
Reform hold		Swing		

=== 1925 election ===
General election, 1925: Invercargill
Party	Candidate	Votes	%	±%
Liberal	Sir Joseph Ward	4,957	46.91	
Reform	James Hargest	4,798	45.41	
Labour	Pat Hickey	811	7.68	
Majority		159	1.50	−9.22
Informal votes		55	0.52	−0.34
Turnout		10,621	93.73	+3.44
Registered electors		11,332		

=== 1928 election ===
1928 general election: Invercargill
Party	Candidate	Votes	%	±%
United	Sir Joseph Ward	7,309	63.89	+16.98
Reform	Morell Macalister	4,131	36.11	
Majority		3,178	27.78	+26.27
Informal votes		88	0.76	+0.25
Turnout		11,528	93.12	−0.61
Registered electors		12,380		

== Local elections ==
=== 1881 election ===
Campbelltown mayoral election, 1881
Party	Candidate	Votes	%	±%
Independent	Joseph Ward	52	75.36	
Independent	Walter Searle	17	24.64	
Majority		35	50.72	
Turnout		69		

=== 1882 election ===
Campbelltown mayoral election, 1882
Party	Candidate	Votes	%	±%
Independent	Joseph Ward	Unopposed		
Registered electors				

=== 1883 election ===
Campbelltown mayoral election, 1883
Party	Candidate	Votes	%	±%
Independent	Joseph Ward	35	71.43	
Independent	Timothy James Warren	14	28.57	
Majority		21	42.85	
Turnout		49		
