= Electoral history of Adam Hamilton =

New Zealand politician's electoral history

This is a summary of the electoral history of Adam Hamilton, Leader of the National Party (1936–40), and Member of Parliament for Wallace (1919–22, 1925-1946).

== Parliamentary elections ==
=== 1919 election ===
1919 general election: Wallace
Party	Candidate	Votes	%	±%
Reform	Adam Hamilton	2,843	49.86	
Liberal	John Thomson	2,800	49.11	−9.37
Informal votes		58	1.01	−0.01
Majority		43	0.75	
Turnout		5,701	82.73	−0.59
Registered electors		6,891		

=== 1922 election ===
1922 general election: Wallace
Party	Candidate	Votes	%	±%
Liberal	John Thomson	3,646	51.13	+2.02
Reform	Adam Hamilton	3,441	48.26	−1.60
Informal votes		43	0.60	−0.41
Majority		205	2.87	
Turnout		7,130	88.10	+5.37
Registered electors		8,093		

=== 1925 election ===
1925 general election: Wallace
Party	Candidate	Votes	%	±%
Reform	Adam Hamilton	4,001	53.45	+5.19
Labour	James Morris MacKenzie	2,673	35.71	
Liberal	George Shepherd Edie	432	5.77	
Independent Liberal	Peter Gilfedder	277	3.70	
Informal votes		102	1.36	+0.76
Majority		1,328	17.74	+14.87
Turnout		7,485	93.12	+5.02
Registered electors		8,038		

=== 1928 election ===
1928 general election: Wallace
Party	Candidate	Votes	%	±%
Reform	Adam Hamilton	4,360	48.79	−4.66
United	Walter Taylor	4,340	48.56	
Independent Liberal	George Pulley	139	1.55	
Informal votes		97	1.08	−0.28
Majority		20	0.22	−17.52
Turnout		8,936	91.69	+1.43
Registered electors		9,745		

=== 1931 election ===
1931 general election: Wallace
Party	Candidate	Votes	%	±%
Reform	Adam Hamilton	5,408	67.82	+19.03
Independent	Peter Gilfedder	2,566	32.18	
Informal votes		72	0.89	−0.19
Majority		2,842	35.64	+35.42
Turnout		8,046	82.31	−9.38
Registered electors		9,775		

=== 1935 election ===
1935 general election: Wallace
Party	Candidate	Votes	%	±%
Reform	Adam Hamilton	4,674	50.66	−17.16
Labour	Lawrence Edmond	2,640	28.61	
Democrat	William Hinchey	1,821	19.73	
Independent Labour	Thomas Rewcastle	91	0.98	
Informal votes		54	0.58	−0.31
Majority		2,034	22.04	−13.60
Turnout		9,226	91.37	+9.06
Registered electors		10,097		

=== 1938 election ===
1938 general election: Wallace
Party	Candidate	Votes	%	±%
National	Adam Hamilton	5,353	54.00	+3.34
Labour	John James Lynch	4,509	45.49	
Informal votes		50	0.50	−0.08
Majority		844	8.51	−13.53
Turnout		9,912	92.70	+1.33
Registered electors		10,692		

=== 1943 election ===
1943 general election: Wallace
Party	Candidate	Votes	%	±%
National	Adam Hamilton	4,738	55.03	+1.03
Labour	John James Lynch	3,131	36.36	−9.13
Independent	Patrick J. McMullan	675	7.84	
Informal votes		65	0.75	+0.25
Majority		1,607	18.66	+10.15
Turnout		8,609	91.74	−0.96
Registered electors		9,384		

== Leadership elections ==
=== 1936 leadership election ===
Name	Votes	Percentage
Adam Hamilton	13	52.00%
Charles Wilkinson	12	48.00%

=== 1940 leadership election ===
Name	Votes	Percentage
Sidney Holland	13	61.90%
Adam Hamilton	8	38.10%
