= 1897 Awarua by-election =

New Zealand by-election

← 1896 general	5 August 1897	1899 general →
- Turnout: 2,976
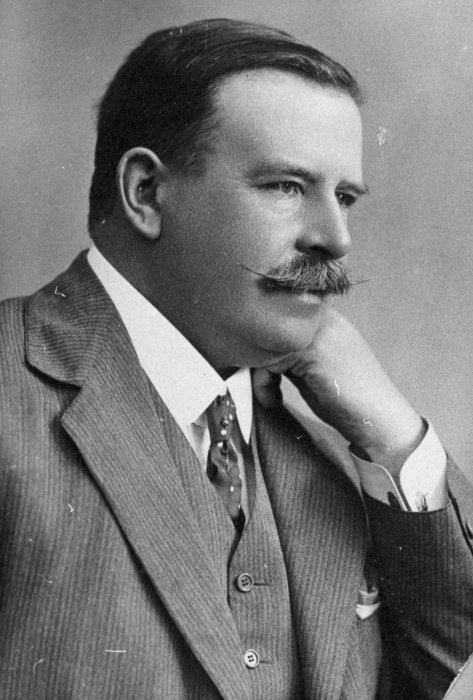

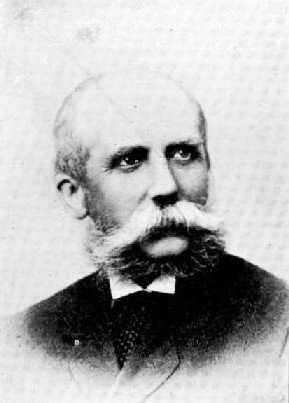
Candidate	Joseph Ward	Cuthbert Cowan
Party	Liberal	Conservative
Popular vote	2,066	910
Percentage	69.42	30.58
Member before election
Joseph Ward
Liberal
Elected Member
Joseph Ward
Liberal

A by-election was held for the Awarua electorate on 5 August 1897, for the seat vacated by Joseph Ward, which he had held since 1887. Despite having had to resign due to bankruptcy, he exploited a legal loophole and was re-elected to the 13th New Zealand Parliament.

== Background and election ==
Joseph Ward first won election to the Awarua electorate in the 1897 election. He held many portfolios in the Seddon Ministry, including that of Treasurer (i.e. Minister of Finance), when Justice Williams declared him "hopelessly insolvent" in 1896. He was forced to resign his portfolios in Cabinet on 16 June. In 1897, he had to file for bankruptcy, and was adjudicated bankrupt on 8 July 1897. He was then legally obliged to resign his seat in Parliament, which he did on 14 July.

A loophole, however, meant that there was nothing to stop him from simply contesting it again. He did so, and was re-elected with an increased majority. His opponent, both in the previous general election in 1896 and in the by-election was Cuthbert Cowan, who had previously represented the Wallace (1869) and Hokonui (1884–1890) electorates.

Parliament passed a special Act on 13 October, the Awarua Seat Enquiry Act 1897, which required the Court of Appeal to urgently decide whether he could be re-elected to Parliament, and the court decided in his favour. The court judgement was published as AJHR H32 of 1897.

Ward actually gained considerable popularity as a result of his financial troubles; Ward was widely seen as a great benefactor of the Southland region, and public perceptions were that he was being persecuted by his enemies over an honest mistake. Gradually, Ward rebuilt his businesses, and paid off his debtors. Richard Seddon, still prime minister, quickly reappointed Ward to Cabinet.

== 1896 general election result ==
1896 election
Party	Candidate	Votes	%	±%
Liberal	Joseph Ward	1,836	63.60	
Conservative	Cuthbert Cowan	1,051	36.40	
Turnout		2,887	72.68	
Majority		785	27.19	
Registered electors		3,887		

== 1897 by-election result ==
The following table gives the by-election results:

1897 Awarua by-election
Party	Candidate	Votes	%	±%
Liberal	Joseph Ward	2,066	69.42	+5.82
Conservative	Cuthbert Cowan	910	30.58	−5.82
Turnout		2,976		
Majority		1,156	38.84	+11.65
