= 1875 Wallace by-election =

New Zealand by-election

The 1875 Wallace by-election was a by-election held on 6 August in the Wallace electorate in Southland during the 5th New Zealand Parliament.

The by-election was caused by the death of incumbent MP George Webster on 15 July 1875.

The seat was won by Christopher Basstian. The other nominees were Captain Robert Cameron of Winton and Dr Monckton.

== Results ==
The following table gives the election results:

1875 Wallace by-election
| Party | Candidate | Votes | % | ±% |
|---|---|---|---|---|
| Independent | Christopher Basstian | 57 | 48.72 | |
| Independent | Robert Cameron | 38 | 32.48 | |
| Independent | Dr Francis Alexander Monckton | 22 | 18.80 | |
| Majority | | 19 | 16.24 | |
| Turnout | | 117 | | |
