= 1981 Special Honours (New Zealand) =

Awards list for New Zealand

The 1981 Special Honours in New Zealand was a Special Honours List, published on 8 May 1981 and with effect from 30 April 1981, in which New Zealand's outgoing deputy prime minister was recognised.

== Member of the Order of the Companions of Honour (CH) ==
- The Right Honourable Brian Edward Talboys MP – Minister of Foreign Affairs and Minister of Trade, lately Deputy Prime Minister of New Zealand.
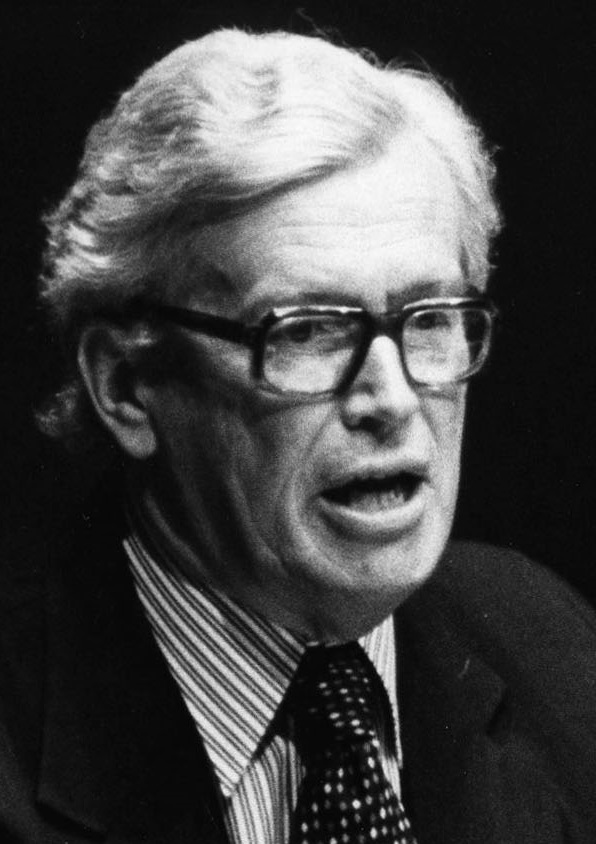
Brian Talboys
