= Adam Hamilton (New Zealand politician) =

New Zealand politician

The Honourable Adam Hamilton
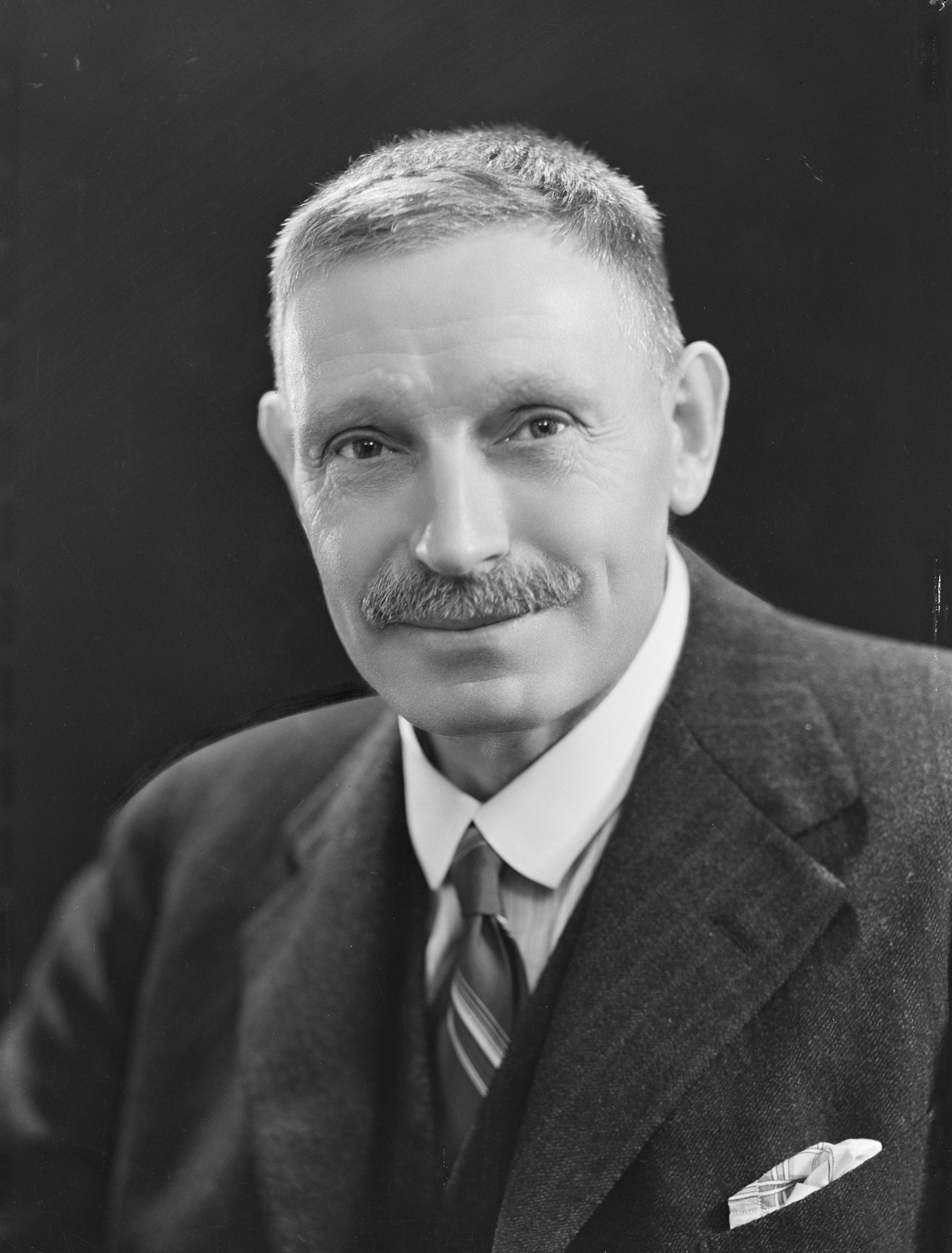
- Hamilton in the 1930s

14th Leader of the Opposition
- In office 2 November 1936 – 26 November 1940
- Preceded by: George Forbes
- Succeeded by: Sidney Holland

1st Leader of the National Party
- In office 2 November 1936 – 26 November 1940
- Preceded by: Office created
- Succeeded by: Sidney Holland

13th Minister of Labour
- In office 22 September 1931 – 6 December 1935
- Prime Minister: George Forbes
- Preceded by: James Donald
- Succeeded by: Tim Armstrong

30th Postmaster-General and Minister of Telegraphs
- In office 22 September 1931 – 6 December 1935
- Prime Minister: George Forbes
- Succeeded by: Fred Jones

5th Minister of Statistics
- In office 22 September 1931 – 6 December 1935
- Prime Minister: George Forbes
- Preceded by: Philip De La Perrelle
- Succeeded by: Walter Nash

8th Minister of Tourism
- In office 22 September 1931 – 6 December 1935
- Prime Minister: George Forbes
- Preceded by: Philip De La Perrelle
- Succeeded by: Frank Langstone

Member of the New Zealand Parliament for Wallace
- In office 4 November 1925 – 27 November 1946
- Preceded by: John Charles Thomson
- Succeeded by: Tom Macdonald
- In office 17 December 1919 – 7 December 1922
- Preceded by: John Charles Thomson
- Succeeded by: John Charles Thomson

Personal details
- Born: 20 August 1880 Forest Hill, Southland, New Zealand
- Died: 29 April 1952 (aged 71) Invercargill, Southland, New Zealand
- Party: Reform (1919–36); National (1936–46)
- Spouse: Mary Ann McDonald (m.1913)
- Relations: John Ronald Hamilton (brother)
- Profession: Retailer

Adam Hamilton (20 August 1880 – 29 April 1952) was a New Zealand politician. He was the first non-interim Leader of the National Party during its early years in Opposition.

== Early life ==
Hamilton was born in Forest Hill, near Winton, Southland. He originally trained to become a Presbyterian minister, but later decided not to pursue this course. He married Mary Ann McDonald in 1913, and in 1914, he and his brother John Ronald Hamilton started a grain business in Winton. In World War I, he was rejected for service on medical grounds.

== Member of Parliament ==
New Zealand Parliament
Years	Term	Electorate	Party
1919–1922	20th	Wallace	Reform
1925–1928	22nd	Wallace	Reform
1928–1931	23rd	Wallace	Reform
1931–1935	24th	Wallace	Reform
1935–1936	25th	Wallace	Reform
1936–1938	Changed allegiance to:		National
1938–1943	26th	Wallace	National
1943–1946	27th	Wallace	National

In the 1919 election, Hamilton was elected to Parliament in the Southland seat of Wallace, standing as a Reform Party candidate. His brother John Ronald Hamilton was also elected, winning the neighbouring seat of Awarua from Joseph Ward. The brothers then sold their business, although Adam Hamilton remained active in the Southland agricultural sector. In the 1922 election, the brothers were both defeated, but they regained their seats in the 1925 election. Adam Hamilton retained his seat until his retirement, although his brother was defeated again in 1928.

When the Reform Party formed a coalition with the United Party, Hamilton was made Minister of Internal Affairs. He also served, at various times, as Minister of Telegraphs, Postmaster General, Minister of Labour, and Minister of Employment. He was not popular in these roles. The Great Depression had resulted in high levels of unemployment, and Hamilton was often criticised for the government's failure to improve the situation. He was also criticised when the Post and Telegraph Department jammed a broadcast that was expected to be pro-Labour by a private radio station by Colin Scrimgeour just before the 1935 general election. Hamilton denied knowledge of the jamming, but his reputation was nevertheless damaged.

In 1935, Hamilton was awarded the King George V Silver Jubilee Medal. Having served as a member of the Executive Council for more than three years, Hamilton was granted the retention of the title of "Honourable" following the 1935 election.

=== Party leader ===
In 1936, after losing power to the Labour Party, Reform and United agreed to merge, creating the National Party. Despite his somewhat tarnished public image, Hamilton was selected to lead the new party and took over from interim leader George Forbes.

Hamilton was essentially a compromise candidate. Former United leader Forbes and his main opponent, former Reform leader Gordon Coates, refused to serve under each other. Forbes was himself believed to have preferred Charles Wilkinson, having invited Wilkinson to join the new National Party in 1936 with the thought that the leadership could be taken up in the future by an experienced parliamentarian whose record was untainted by the last government. But Coates was determined to have a fellow Reformist as leader. With the support of a Coates-led faction (including Hamilton) who threatened to split the National Party apart and re-start the Reform Party if Hamilton was not made leader, Adam Hamilton was duly elected on 31 October 1936, although only by one vote.

Given the narrowness of his victory, many did not see Hamilton as the National Party's real leader. He was frequently accused by being a puppet of Coates, with suggestions even being made that Hamilton was merely holding the position until Coates built up the strength to take it himself. Hamilton was not particularly charismatic and did not inspire great loyalty from his colleagues. He was also closely associated in the public mind with the Depression era.

In the 1938 election, Hamilton and National were harshly critical of the Labour government and accused it of promoting communism and undermining the British Empire. The campaign was seen by many as alarmist and negative, and Hamilton's own performance was widely censured. On election day, National was heavily defeated.

The defeat weakened Hamilton's grasp on the leadership somewhat, but any debate as to his future was cut short by the onset of World War II.

In 1940, Hamilton suggested that Labour and National should form a wartime coalition, but that was rejected by the Labour leader, Peter Fraser, who, however, agreed to establish a six-person "War Cabinet". This cabinet would control New Zealand's military endeavours and leave domestic concerns to the regular cabinet. The War Cabinet would consist of four Labour MPs and two National MPs. Hamilton and Coates were National's two representatives. Participation in the War Cabinet was fatally damaging to Hamilton's leadership of the National Party, however, as many National MPs argued that he could not be party leader while he served on a Labour-led council. On 25 November, a vote of 13 to 8 replaced Hamilton with Sidney Holland.

=== Later career ===
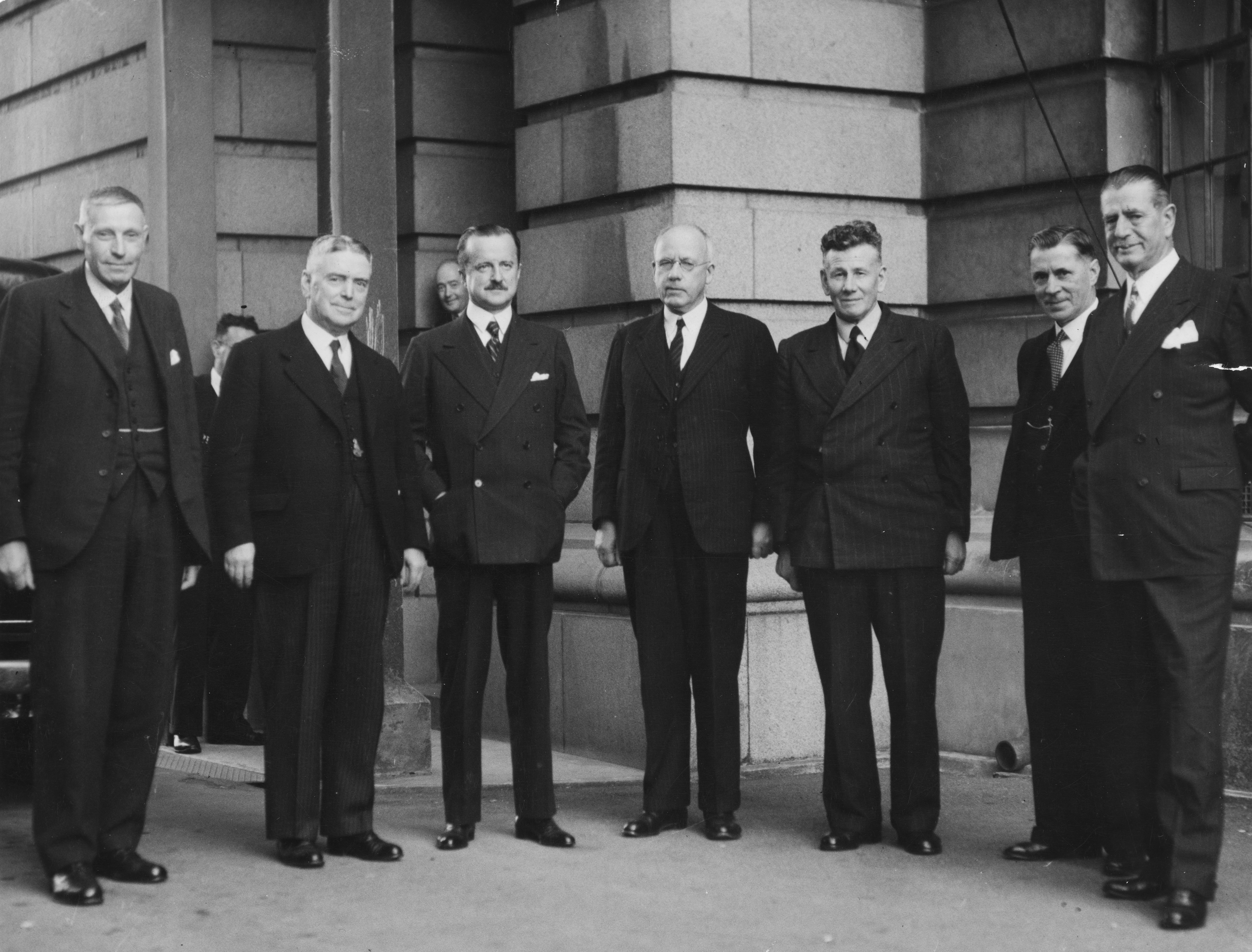
Hamilton (far left) with members of the war cabinet, 1941

Hamilton remained a part of the War Cabinet and was eventually joined by Holland despite the original claims that a National Party leader could not be in it. In 1942, however, National withdrew from all co-operation with the Labour Party. Hamilton, along with Coates, protested that move and ceased attending National caucus meetings. Both Hamilton and Coates then rejoined the war administration despite condemnation from their party colleagues.

Eventually, Hamilton managed to bring about a rapprochement with the National Party, unlike Coates, who became an independent. Hamilton contested the 1943 election as a National candidate. He did not seek re-election in the 1946 election and chose to retire from politics.

Hamilton died in Invercargill on 29 April 1952 and is buried at Winton Cemetery.

== See also ==
- Electoral history of Adam Hamilton

New Zealand Parliament
Preceded by John Charles Thomson	Member of Parliament for Wallace; 1919–1922 1925–1946	Succeeded by John Charles Thomson
Preceded by John Charles Thomson	Member of Parliament for Wallace; 1919–1922 1925–1946	Succeeded by Tom Macdonald
Political offices
Preceded by James Donald	Postmaster-General and Minister of Telegraphs; 1931–1935	Succeeded by Fred Jones
Preceded by George Forbes	Leader of the Opposition; 1936–1940	Succeeded by Sidney Holland
