= Mary Ann Mantell =

British fossil collector (1795–1869)

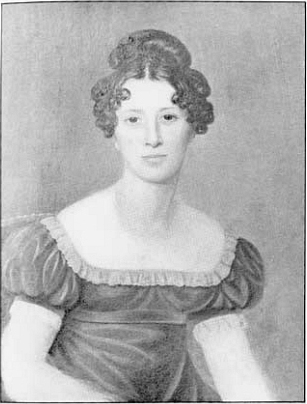
- Born: Mary Ann Woodhouse; 9 April 1795; Paddington, London, England
- Died: 20 October 1869 (aged 74); London, England
- Occupations: fossil collector, lithographer
- Known for: Discovering Iguanodon
- Spouse: Gideon Mantell (m. 1816, divorced)
- Children: 3, including Walter

Mary Ann Mantell (née Woodhouse; 9 April 1795 – 20 October 1869) was a British fossil collector and the wife of the British paleontologist Gideon Mantell. She is credited – although this is disputed – with the discovery of the first fossils of Iguanodon and provided several pen and ink sketches of the fossils for her husband's scientific description of the Iguanodon.

== Iguanodon discovery ==
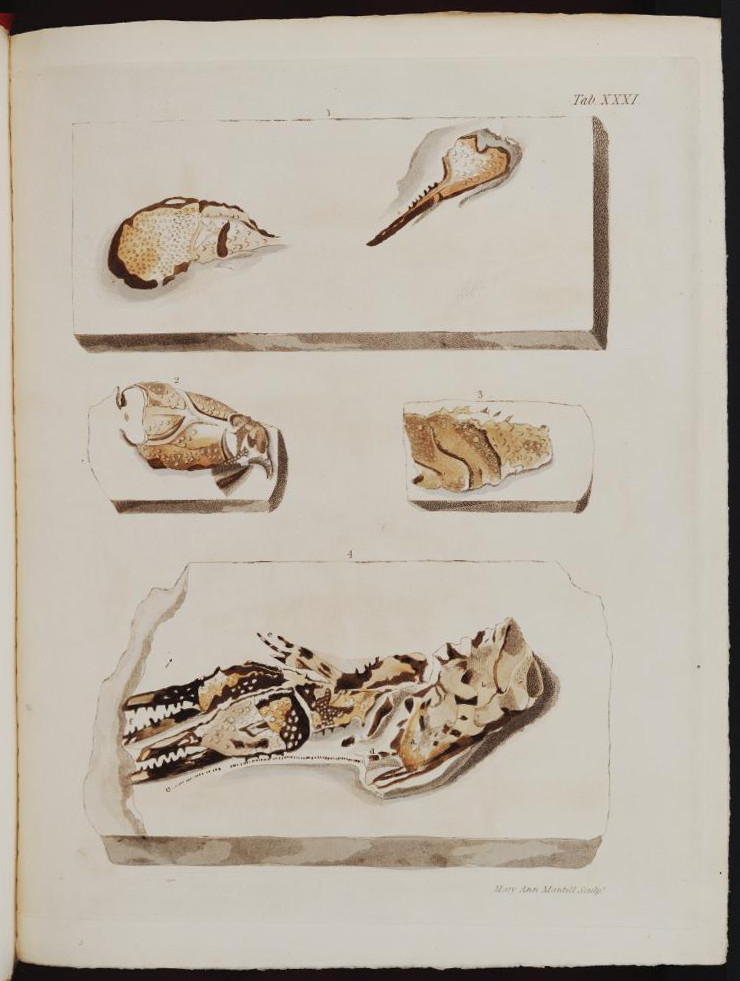
Illustration from the book The Fossils of the South Downs, engraved by Mary Ann Mantell from sketches by Gideon Mantell. The book describes geological formations and fossils found in the South Downs of Sussex, England. Shelfmark: OUM: 1 d. 67. This is plate V, showing strata between Brighton and Rotterdean, strata to the West of Rotterdean, and the landing place at Rotterdean.

Per the Mantells' original story, in 1822, while Mary Ann Mantell was accompanying her husband (Note: Her husband Gideon Mantell was a GP in Sussex as well as a noted geologist and palaeontologist.) in Sussex as he was visiting a patient, she discovered tooth-shaped fossils on the side of the road, later presenting her find to Gideon. Gideon Mantell "at first endorsed but recanted" this story after their divorce; since then, "doubt has been poured on the somewhat romanticized claim both on her involvement and the date...with the suggestion that the Mantells probably bought the first teeth off local quarrymen." New research, based on an 1887 article in the Mid Sussex Times, suggests that both versions of the story could be true simultaneously. In this recounting, Mary Ann was walking with a friend, Mrs. Bridget Waller, when they came across a workman breaking stones by the roadside. Mary Ann then "perceived what appeared to be a fossil on one of the stones...stayed to examine it, and being satisfied of its nature gave the man a gratuity to take it to Mrs. Waller’s house, from whence Mrs. Mantell took it home for her husband’s inspection." Gideon himself then went down to the quarry, and, having learned that such finds were common, asked the workmen to hold onto any new fossils they might find until his next visit, with the promise of payment on collection.

Regardless of how the teeth were found, Gideon then proceeded to send Mary Ann’s fossils to Charles Lyell, who brought them to the attention of Georges Cuvier. Cuvier initially told Lyell he thought the teeth were from a rhinoceros; he retracted that statement the very next day, but all Lyell reported to the Mantells was Cuvier's initial dismissal of their discovery.

In 1824, William Buckland visited the Mantells and examined the fossil teeth himself; in contrast to Cuvier's assessment, Buckland concluded that they belonged to a giant saurian. This encouraged the Mantells to send the fossils to Cuvier for another examination; Cuvier responded to the Mantells on 22 June 1824.

The most important remarks in Cuvier's response to Gideon Mantell were included in Mantell's paper published in the Philosophical Transactions of the Royal Society of London in 1825. Cuvier had written "These teeth are certainly unknown to me; they are not [from] a carnivorous animal, and yet I believe that they belong, given their little complication, their serrating on the edges, and the thin layer of enamel that revet them, to the order of the reptiles. The outside appearance could also be taken for fish teeth similar to tetrodons, or diodons; but their internal structure is very different from those of [that type]. Wouldn't we have a new animal here, a herbivorous reptile?" (Note: Letter from Mantell in 1825:"As these teeth were distinct from any that had previously come under my notice, I felt anxious to submit them to the examination of persons whose knowledge and means of observation were more extensive than my own; I therefore transmitted specimens to some of the most eminent naturalists in this country, and on the continent. But although my communications were acknowledged with that candour and liberality which constantly characterises the intercourse of scientific men, yet no light was thrown upon the subject, except by the illustrious Baron Cuvier, whose opinions will best appear by the following extract from the correspondence with which he honoured me.") Cuvier had also pointed out in his letter to Mantell that "it is impossible that one day a part of the reunited skeleton will not be found with portions of jaws bearing teeth. It is this last object above all that it is a matter of searching with the most perseverance." Mantell launched an excavation of the Tilgate Forest, which resulted in the discovery of the herbivorous reptile, the Iguanodon.

== Contribution to husband's work ==
Mary Ann Mantell, like many women of the period in her position, made a "not-insignificant contribution" as "wife-assistant to her husband in collecting, illustrating and engraving." She drew up 364 detailed lithographs of the fossils for her husband's scientific publication The Fossils of the South Downs published in 1822, and in Illustrations of the Geology of Sussex published in 1827, in which Gideon Mantell describes the Iguanodon, named due to the resemblance of the fossil teeth to those of modern day iguanas. Gideon Mantell "was very proud of his wife's work" and emphasised the accuracy of his wife's depictions despite her lack of previous lithographic work, mentioning in his foreword that "as the engravings are the first performances of a lady but little skilled in the art, I am most anxious to claim for them every indulgence ... although they may be destitute of that neatness and uniformity, which distinguish the works of the professed artist, they will not, I trust, be found deficient in the more essential requisite of correctness." The discovery of the Iguanodon caused excitement amongst paleontologists it was the second largest reptile fossil to be discovered and the teeth of the Iguanodon suggested that the large reptile was an herbivore; whilst many believed that all ancestors of reptiles were carnivores, like the Megalosaurus, discovered by William Buckland in 1824.

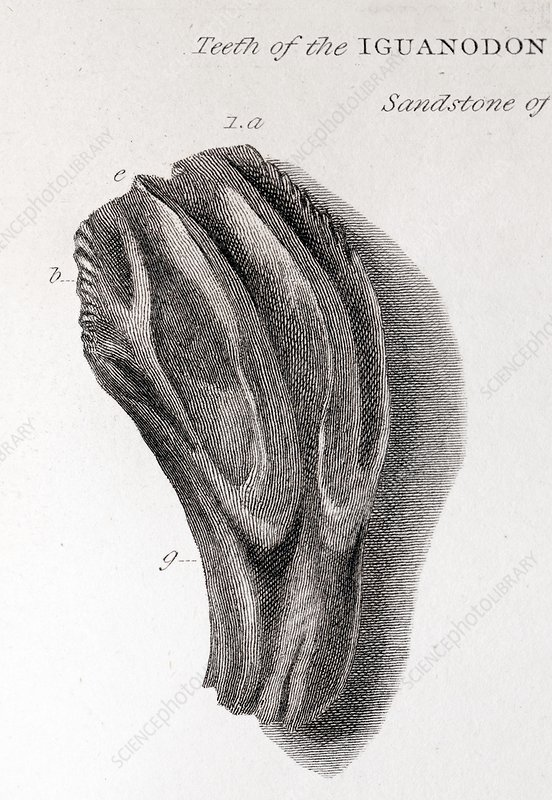
Lithograph drawing of Iguanodon tooth drawn by Mary Ann

Mantell's significant discovery in Regency England was largely ignored at the time, but has more recently been recognised and ranked alongside those made by other women such as Mary Anning of Dorset or Etheldred Benett of Wiltshire.

== Family life ==
Mary Ann Woodhouse was born on 9 April 1795 to George Edward Woodhouse and Mary Ann Woodhouse. In 1816 she married Gideon Mantell and lived with him in Lewes. Although initially she accompanied Mantell on his fossil collection trips, their marital relationship suffered and the pair became increasingly distant, causing their marriage to end in divorce. Gideon Mantell bemoaned this separation: "There was a time when my poor wife felt deep interest in my pursuits, and was proud of my success, but of late years that feeling had passed away and she was annoyed rather than gratified by my devotion to science." They had three children together, including prominent New Zealand scientist and politician Walter Mantell. Gideon was the primary caretaker of the children after the divorce was finalised. (Note: At the time it was customary for children to remain with their father, this was changed under the Divorce Act of 1857, some 18 years later.) Except for brief visits in 1840 for the funeral of their second daughter, and in 1850 to Chester Square in London, there is no evidence the couple had any further association. Gideon Mantell was plagued with illness in his latter years and died in 1852 of an overdose of opium taken "medically to relieve pain". Mary died at her home in Chepstow Villas, Bayswater, London on 20 October 1869.

== Sources ==
- Burek, C.V; Higgs, B (2007). Burek, C.V; Higgs, B (eds.). The Role of Women in the History of Geology. London: Geological Society Publications. doi:10.1144/SP281.1. ISBN 978-1-86239-227-4. S2CID 140651108.
- Chamberlain, John A. Jr. (2015). "Dinosaur History". Brooklyn College City University of New York.
- Davidson, Jane P. (2017). Patrons of Paleontology – How Government Support Shaped a Science. Indiana University Press. ISBN 9780253033567.
- Dean, Dennis R. (1999). Gideon Mantell and the discovery of dinosaurs. Cambridge: Cambridge University Press. ISBN 0-521-42048-2.
- Mantell, Gideon (1822). The Fossils of the South Downs or illustrations of the Geology of Sussex. London: Lupton Relfe. OCLC 59551138. "The Engravings executed by Mrs Mantell from drawings by the author"
- Mantell, Gideon (1825), Notice on the Iguanodon, a newly discovered fossil, from the sandstone of Tilgate, in Sussex. By Gideon Mantell, F. L. S. and M. G. S. Fellow of the College of Surgeons, In a Letter to Davies Gilbert, Esq. M. P. V. P. R. S. &c. &c. &c. Communicated by D. Gilbert, Esq., Royal Society of London, doi:10.1098/rstl.1825.0010, S2CID 109777214
- Ogilvie, Marilyn Bailey; Harvey, Joy Dorothy (2000). The Biographical Dictionary of Women in Science: L-Z. Taylor & Francis. p. 837. ISBN 041592040X.
- Powling, Joshua (2020). "Details of dinosaur discovery in Cuckfield are a 'hugely significant'". National World Publishing Ltd. Archived from the original on 10 October 2022.
- Probate (1869). "England and Wales National Probate Calendar 1858–1966". UK Government Probate Service.
- Sorrenson, Keith (1990). "Mantell, Walter Baldock Durrant". Dictionary of New Zealand Biography. Ministry for Culture and Heritage.
- Swinton, W. E. (1975). "Gideon Algernon Mantell" (PDF). British Medical Journal. 1 (505). Br Med J: 505–507. doi:10.1136/bmj.1.5956.505. PMC 1672598. PMID 1092405.
- Turner, Susan; Burek, Cynthia; Moody, Richard (2010). "Forgotten women in an extinct saurian (man's) world". Geological Society, London, Special Publications. 343 (1). Geological Society of London Special Publications: 111–153. Bibcode:2010GSLSP.343..111T. doi:10.1144/SP343.7. S2CID 130338204.
