= Walter Mantell =

New Zealand naturalist and politician (1820–1895)

The Honourable Walter Mantell
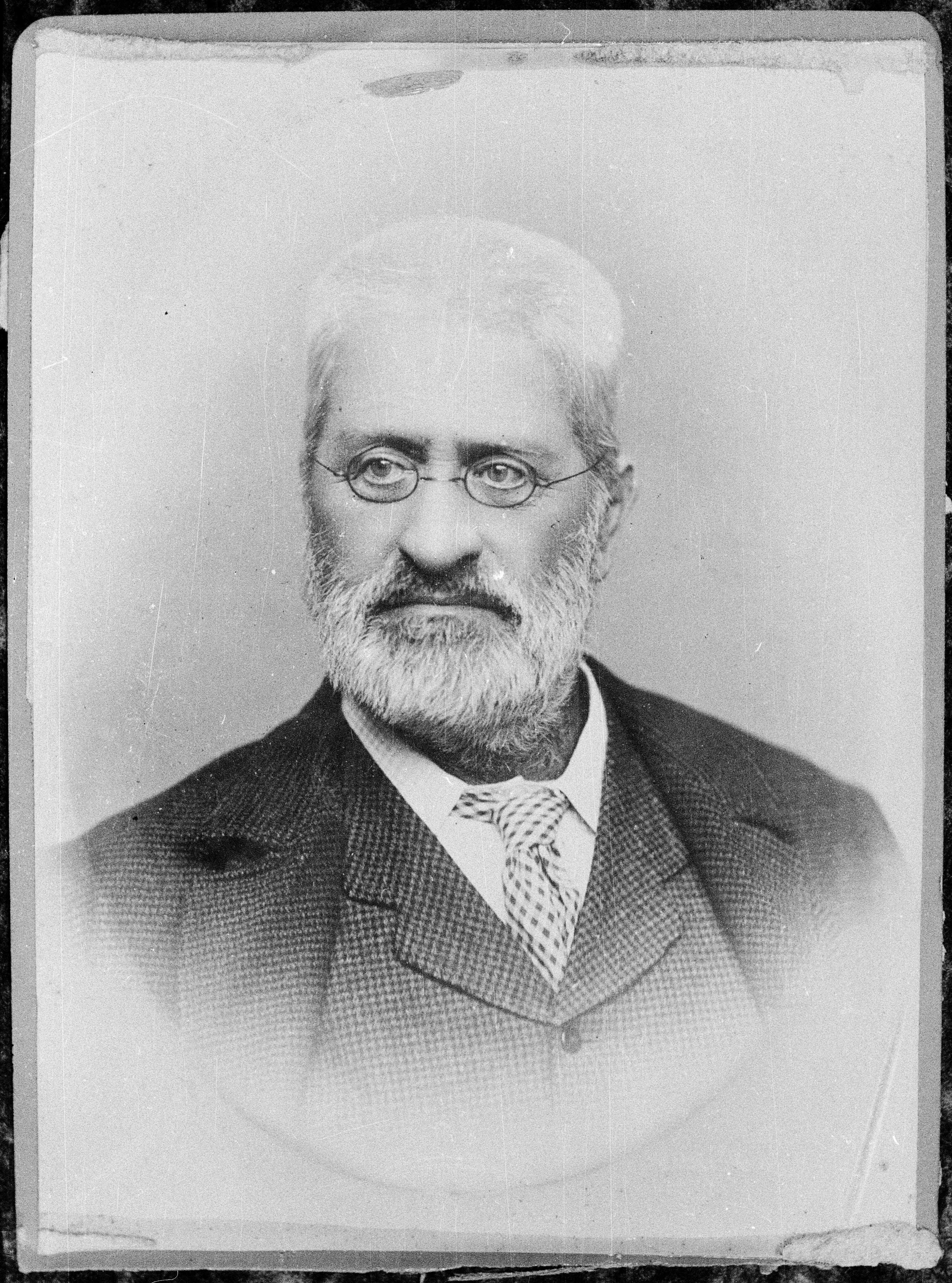
- Mantell in c.1870

3rd Minister of Māori Affairs
- In office July 1861 – December 1861
- Prime Minister: William Fox
- In office December 1864 – July 1865
- Prime Minister: Frederick Weld

Postmaster-General
- In office August 1862 – August 1862
- Prime Minister: Alfred Domett

Member of the New Zealand Parliament for Wallace
- In office 1861–1866

Personal details
- Born: Walter Baldock Durrant Mantell; 11 March 1820 Lewes, Sussex, England
- Died: 7 September 1895 (aged 75) Wellington, New Zealand
- Spouses: Mary Sarah Prince (m. 1869; died 1873) Jane Hardwick (m. 1876)
- Relations: Gideon Mantell (father); Mary Ann Mantell (mother)

Walter Baldock Durrant Mantell (11 March 1820 – 7 September 1895) was a 19th-century New Zealand naturalist, politician, and land purchase commissioner. He was a founder and first secretary of the New Zealand Institute, and a collector of moa remains.

== Early life ==
Mantell was born in Lewes, Sussex, England, the son of geologists Gideon Mantell and Mary Ann Mantell (née Woodhouse). He arrived in Wellington on the Oriental in 1840.

After his father committed suicide in 1852, much of his collection of fossils was inherited by Walter and consequently transported to New Zealand.

Mantell left New Zealand as he did not feel right about trying to convince the indigenous Māori people to undersell their land and returned to England in 1856, where he met Geraldine Jewsbury, a woman eight years his senior. When in New Zealand, the Maori people called Mantell "Matara". Jewsbury used this as a nickname for Mantell. When Mantell was in England he had difficulty finding work. He became restless at home as well as a tendency to act as a hypochondriac. Jewsbury encouraged him to write for the Westminster Gazette or to write a novel about New Zealand. Mantell eventually became tired of his friend's persistent advice. Jewsbury, however, wanted what was best for Mantell and felt deeply attached to him; she once proposed marriage to Mantell in a letter, but he declined her offer. By 1859 Jewsbury had ceased trying to win his love. Shortly thereafter, Mantell returned to New Zealand.

== Political career ==
New Zealand Parliament
Years	Term	Electorate	Party
1861–1866	3rd	Wallace	Independent

Mantell represented the Wallace electorate from 1861 to 1866, when he retired. He was the Minister of Māori Affairs in 1861 and 1864–65, and Postmaster-General briefly in 1862. From 1866 until his death he was on the New Zealand Legislative Council.

In 1865, he donated the "prime specimen" of his father's fossil collection to Wellington's Colonial Museum (modern-day Museum of New Zealand Te Papa Tongarewa), including the famous tooth that had led to the discovery of Iguanodon.

== Personal life ==
Mantell married Mary Sarah Prince on 5 August 1869. Mary was the daughter of Mary Ann Bevan and Edward Prince and was born in Wellington on 26 August 1845. She died of typhoid at the Mantell home in Sydney Street on 15 March 1873, aged twenty-seven, and was buried in the Bolton Street Cemetery. Mantell had claimed to have married Mary Prince on 29 July 1863.

Mantell married Jane Hardwick a daughter of Benjamin Hardwick of Kent on 10 January 1876 and died in Wellington on 7 September 1895.

Mantell and Mary Prince's son, Walter Godfrey Mantell, was born on 30 April 1864 and legitimized in 1894. He became a dentist in Wellington and married on 28 November 1888 in Auckland Catherine Louise Marguerite Bucholz, daughter of Ernest Louis Bucholz, the late German, Belgian and Italian Consul in Auckland.

== Legacy and commemoration ==
Mantell's fossils remain in possession of the Museum of New Zealand to the present day. Mantell is commemorated in the names of the North Island brown kiwi Apteryx mantelli and the North Island takahē Porphyrio mantelli.

== Bibliography ==
- Bryson, Bill (2016) [1st pub. 2003]. A Short History of Nearly Everything (Reissued Black Swan ed.). Oxford: Transworld Publishers.

Political offices
Preceded by Frederick Weld	Minister of Native Affairs; 1861; 1864–1865	Succeeded by Dillon Bell
Preceded by William Fox	Minister of Native Affairs; 1861; 1864–1865	Succeeded by James FitzGerald
Preceded by Crosbie Ward	Postmaster-General; 1862	Succeeded by Crosbie Ward
New Zealand Parliament
Preceded by Dillon Bell	Member of Parliament for Wallace; 1861–1866; Served alongside: Dillon Bell	Succeeded by Alexander McNeill
