= Christopher Basstian =

New Zealand politician

New Zealand Parliament
| Years | Term | Electorate | Party |
|---|---|---|---|
| 1875 | 5th | Wallace | Independent |

Christopher Basstian (1820–1895) was a 19th-century Member of Parliament from Southland, New Zealand.

He represented the Wallace electorate in 1875, from 6 August to 6 December. One newspaper said before the by-election Mr Basstian's strong squatting proclivities ought certainly to prevent him getting the support of the "bona fide" settlers of the district and those who have any regard for its future prosperity (so preferred Dr Monckton). Another report said that he pronounces in favour of abolition (of the provinces) and is otherwise moderate in politics.

He was defeated in the 1875 general election, held in December.

New Zealand Parliament
| Preceded by George Webster | Member of Parliament for Wallace; 1875 | Succeeded by James Parker Joyce |
