= James Parker Joyce =

New Zealand politician

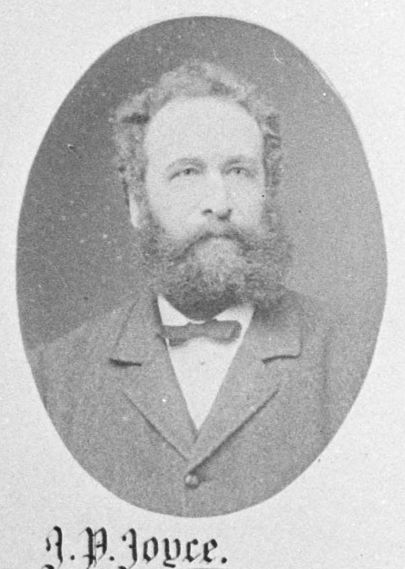
James Parker Joyce in 1882

James Parker Joyce (17 March 1834 – 16 January 1903) was a 19th-century New Zealand politician from Southland. He is regarded as an independent, as there were no political parties in Parliament at that time.

He was born in Southampton, England, and had come to Southland from the goldfields of Ballarat and Bendigo in 1858. He was a journalist and newspaper editor.

New Zealand Parliament
Years	Term	Electorate	Party
1875–1879	6th	Wallace	Independent
1881–1884	8th	Awarua	Independent
1884–1887	9th	Awarua	Independent

He represented the electorates of Wallace from 1875 to 1879 when he was defeated, and then Awarua from 1881 to 1887, when he retired.

He was an editor of the Southland Times and later one of the proprietors of the Southland News, where he was an editor for many years.

Parker Joyce's great-great-great-grandson is New Zealand filmmaker and rugby player Winston Cowie.

New Zealand Parliament
Preceded by Christopher Basstian	Member of Parliament for Wallace; 1875–1879	Succeeded by Henry Hirst
New constituency	Member of Parliament for Awarua; 1881–1887	Succeeded by Joseph Ward
