= Henry Hirst =

New Zealand politician

MP for Wallace
- In office 1879–1881
- Preceded by: James Joyce
- Succeeded by: Theophilus Daniel
- In office 1884–1887
- Preceded by: Theophilus Daniel
- Succeeded by: Samuel Hodgkinson

Personal details
- Born: 1838 Huddersfield, Yorkshire, England
- Died: 14 December 1911 (aged 72–73) Orepuki, New Zealand
- Party: Independent
- Children: 8

Henry Hirst (1838 – 14 December 1911) was a 19th-century Member of Parliament from Southland, New Zealand.

== Private life ==
Hirst was born in 1838 in Huddersfield, Yorkshire, England. He received his education at Huddersfield College. He arrived at Port Chalmers in Otago on the Agra on 30 October 1858 and first settled in the Te Anau / Manapouri area in Southland. Together with John Watts-Russell of Christchurch, he explored Breaksea Sound for open land for sheep farming, but they were unsuccessful in this venture. Next, Hirst settled at Riverton where he had a butchery. In 1860 he married Margaret, a daughter of William and Motoitoi Dallas from the Neck on Stewart Island, in August 1861, he was the first who managed to drive cattle from Southland to the Gabriel's Gully gold field during the Otago gold rush. Some time later, Hirst was farming at Orepuki. When gold was discovered in the locality in 1866, the government resumed the land that he was farming, and he bought another property in the town where he lived for the rest of his life.

== Political career ==
New Zealand Parliament
Years	Term	Electorate	Party
1879–1881	7th	Wallace	Independent
1884–1887	9th	Wallace	Independent

Hirst was elected onto Wallace County Council in 1877 and was its first chairman for eight years. He remained on the county council until his death.

Hirst represented the Wallace electorate from 1879 to 1881, when he was defeated by one vote; and from 1884 to 1887, when he was again defeated. Hirst had further unsuccessful attempts of winning the Wallace electorate in 1890, 1893, and 1896.

Hirst was instrumental in having what became the Tuatapere Branch extended to Riverton.

== Death ==
Hirst died on 14 December 1911 at Orepuki. He was survived by two sons and six daughters.

New Zealand Parliament
Preceded by James Parker Joyce	Member of Parliament for Wallace; 1879–1881; 1884–1887	Succeeded by Theophilus Daniel
Preceded by Theophilus Daniel	Member of Parliament for Wallace; 1879–1881; 1884–1887	Succeeded by Samuel Hodgkinson
