= Gideon Mantell =

British scientist and obstetrician

Gideon Mantell MRCS FRS
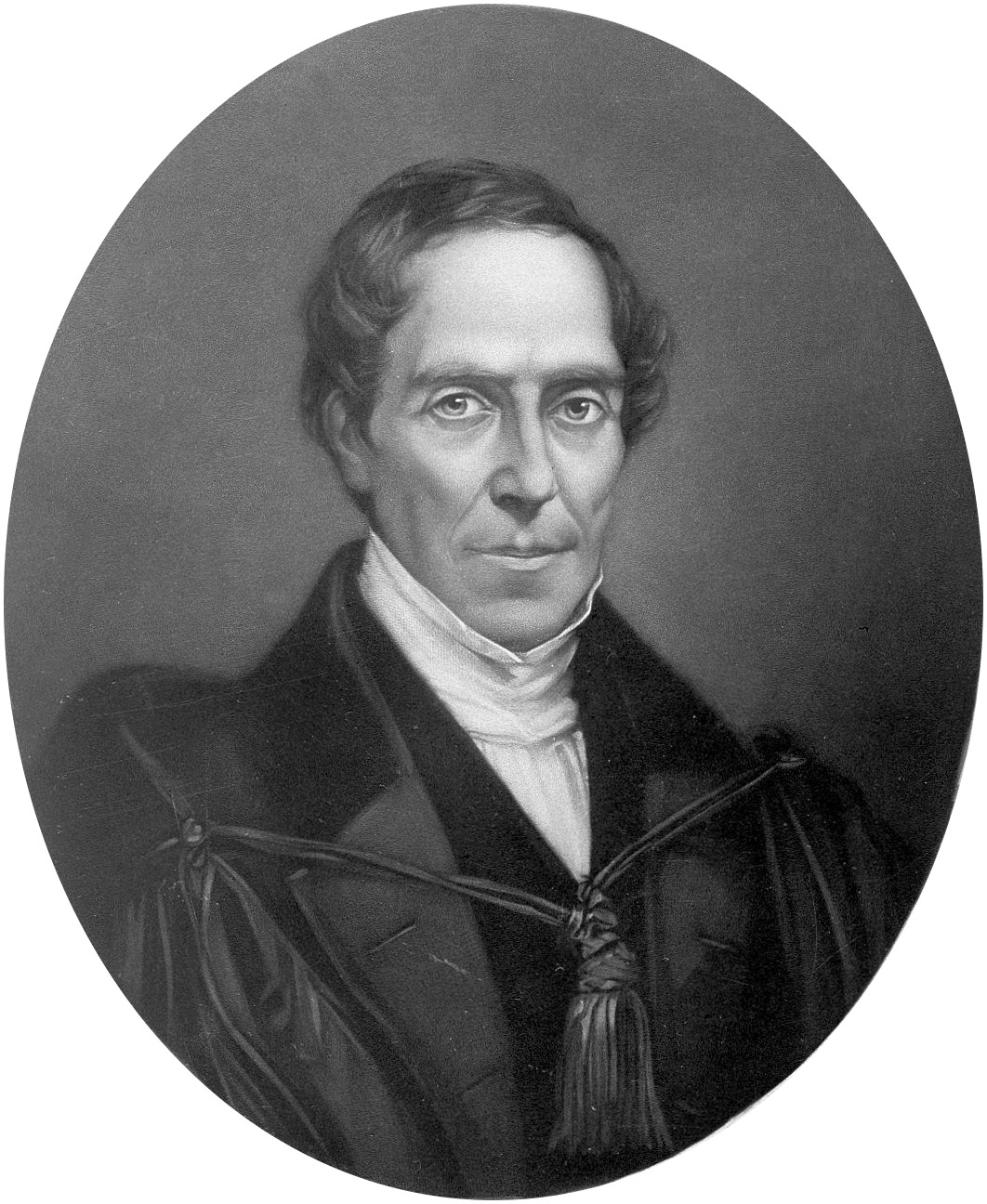
- Born: 3 February 1790; Lewes, Sussex, England
- Died: 10 November 1852 (aged 62); London, England
- Occupations: Surgeon, palaeontologist
- Known for: Describing Iguanodon
- Spouse: Mary Ann Mantell
- Relatives: Walter Mantell (son)
- Awards: Wollaston Medal (1835); Royal Medal (1849)

Gideon Algernon Mantell MRCS FRS (3 February 1790 – 10 November 1852) was an English obstetrician, geologist and palaeontologist. His attempts to reconstruct the structure and life of Iguanodon began the scientific study of dinosaurs: in 1822 he was responsible for the discovery (and the eventual identification) of the first fossil teeth, and later much of the skeleton, of Iguanodon. Mantell's work on the Cretaceous of southern England was also important.

== Early life and medical career ==
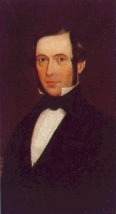
Gideon Mantell – Early portrait

Mantell was born in Lewes, Sussex as the fifth-born child of Thomas Mantell, a shoemaker, and Sarah Austen. He was raised in a small cottage in St. Mary's Lane with his two sisters and four brothers. As a youth, he showed a particular interest in the field of geology. He explored pits and quarries in the surrounding areas, discovering ammonites, shells of sea urchins, fish bones, coral, and worn-out remains of dead animals. The Mantell children could not study at local grammar schools because the elder Mantell was a follower of the Methodist church and the 12 free schools were reserved for children who had been brought up in the Anglican faith. As a result, Gideon was educated at a dame school in St. Mary's Lane, and learned basic reading and writing from an old woman. After the death of his teacher, Mantell was schooled by John Button, a philosophically radical Whig who shared similar political beliefs with Mantell's father. Mantell spent two years with Button, before being sent to his uncle, a Baptist minister, in Swindon, for a period of private study.

Mantell returned to Lewes at age 15. With the help of a local Whig party leader, Mantell secured an apprenticeship with a local surgeon named James Moore. He served as an apprentice to Moore in Lewes for a period of five years, in which he took care of Mantell's dining, lodging and medical issues. Mantell's early apprenticeship duties included cleaning vials, as well as separating and arranging drugs. Soon, he learned how to make pills and other pharmaceutical products. He delivered Moore's medicines, kept his accounts, wrote out bills and extracted teeth from his patients. On 11 July 1807, Thomas Mantell died at the age of 57. He left his son some money for his future studies. As his time in apprenticeship began to wind down, he began to anticipate his medical education. He began to teach himself human anatomy, and he ultimately detailed his new-found knowledge in a volume entitled The Anatomy of the Bones, and the Circulation of Blood, which contained dozens of detailed drawings of fetal and adult skeletal features. Soon, Mantell began his formal medical education in London. He received his diploma as a Member of the Royal College of Surgeons in 1811. Four days later, he received a certificate from the Lying-in Charity for Married Women at Their Own Habitations that allowed him to act in midwifery duties.

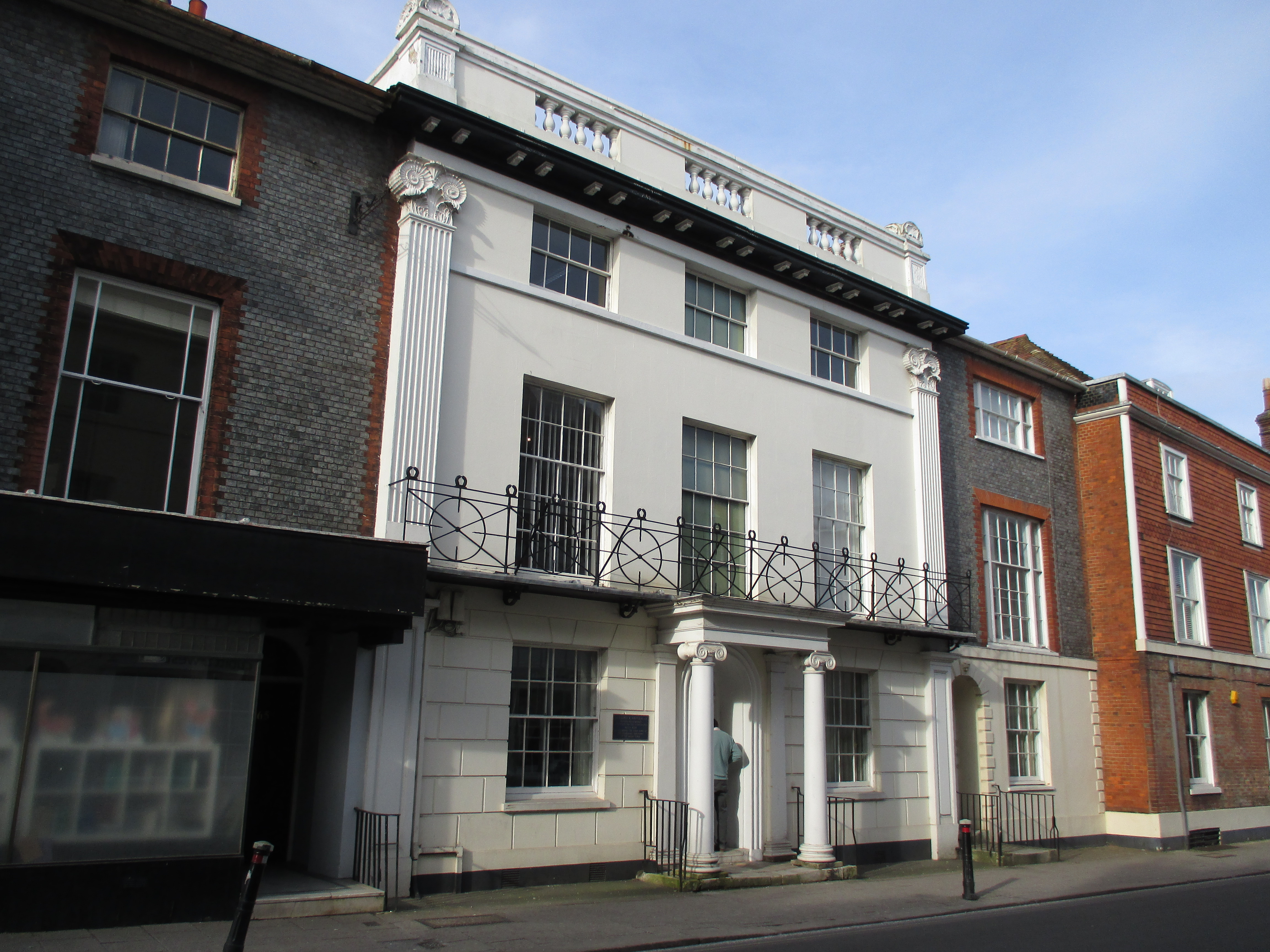
166 High Street, Lewes, the home of Gideon Mantell

He returned to Lewes, and immediately formed a partnership with his former master, James Moore. In the wake of the cholera, typhoid and smallpox epidemics, Mantell found himself quite busy attending to more than 50 patients a day and delivering between 200 and 300 babies a year. As he later recalled, he would have to stay up for "six or seven nights in succession" due to his overwhelming doctoral duties. He was also able to increase his practice's profits from £250 to £750 a year. Although mainly occupied with running his busy country medical practice, he spent his little free time pursuing his passion, geology, often working into the early hours of the morning, identifying fossil specimens he found at the marl pits in Hamsey. In 1813, Mantell began to correspond with James Sowerby. Sowerby, a naturalist and illustrator who catalogued fossil shells, received from Mantell many fossilised specimens. In appreciation for the specimens Mantell had provided, Sowerby named one of the species Ammonites mantelli. On 7 December, Mantell was elected as a fellow of the Linnean Society of London. Two years later, he published his first paper, on the characteristics of the fossils found in the Lewes area.

In 1816, he married Mary Ann Woodhouse, the 20-year-old daughter of one of his former patients who had died three years earlier. Since she was not 21 and still technically a minor under English law, she had to obtain permission from her mother and a special licence to marry Mantell. After obtaining consent and the licence, she married Mantell on 4 May at St. Marylebone Church. That year, he purchased his own medical practice and took up an appointment at the Royal Artillery Hospital, at Ringmer, Lewes.

== Geological research ==
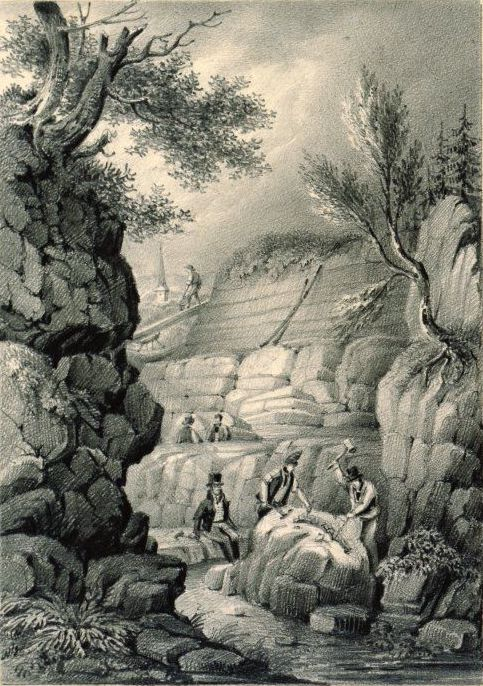
Sketch of Tilgate Quarry with Gideon Mantell overseeing the uncovering of fossils

Inspired by Mary Anning's sensational discovery of a fossilised animal resembling a huge crocodile (later identified as an ichthyosaur) at Lyme Regis in Dorset, Mantell became passionately interested in the study of the fossilised animals and plants found in his area. The fossils he had collected from the region, near The Weald in Sussex, were from the chalk downlands covering the county. The chalk is part of the Upper Cretaceous System and the fossils it contains are marine in origin. But by 1819, Mantell had begun acquiring fossils from a quarry, at Whitemans Green, near Cuckfield. These included the remains of terrestrial and freshwater ecosystems, at a time when all the known fossil remains from Cretaceous England, hitherto, were marine in origin. He named the new strata the Strata of Tilgate Forest, after an historical wooded area and it was later shown to belong to the Lower Cretaceous.

By 1820, he had started to find very large bones at Cuckfield, even larger than those discovered by William Buckland, at Stonesfield in Oxfordshire. Then, in 1822, shortly before finishing his first book (The Fossils of South Downs), his wife found several large teeth (although some historians contend that they were in fact discovered by himself), the origin of which he could not ascertain. In 1821 Mantell planned his next book on the geology of Sussex. It was an immediate success with two hundred subscribers including King George IV at Carlton House Palace, who wrote a letter stating, "His majesty is pleased to command that his name should be placed at the head of the subscription list for four copies."

How the king heard of Mantell is unknown, but Mantell's response is known. Galvanised and encouraged, Mantell showed the teeth to other scientists but they were dismissed as belonging to a fish or mammal and from a more recent rock layer than the other Tilgate Forest fossils. The eminent French anatomist, Georges Cuvier, identified the teeth as those of a rhinoceros.

Although according to Charles Lyell, Cuvier made this statement after a late party and apparently had some doubts when reconsidering the matter when he awoke, fresh in the morning. "The next morning he told me that he was confident that it was something quite different." Strangely, this change of opinion did not make it back to Britain where Mantell was mocked for his error. Mantell was still convinced that the teeth had come from the Mesozoic strata and finally recognised that they resembled those of the iguana, but were twenty times larger. He surmised that the owner of the remains must have been at least 60 feet (18 metres) in length.

== Recognition ==
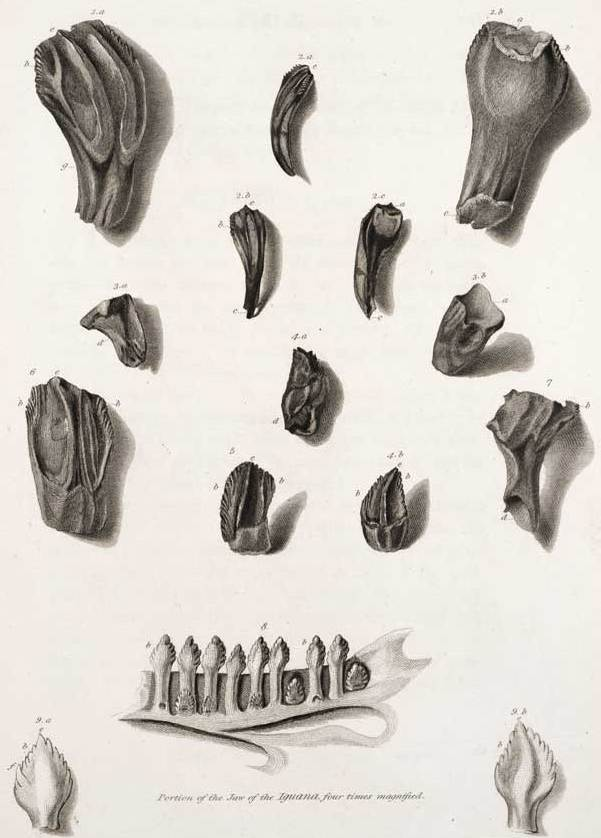
Illustration of fossil Iguanodon teeth with a modern iguana jaw shown beneath them, from Mantell's 1825 paper describing Iguanodon.

He tried in vain to convince his peers that the fossils were from Mesozoic strata, by carefully studying rock layers. William Buckland famously disputed Mantell's assertion, by claiming that the teeth were of fish.

When it was proved Mantell was correct in 1825, the only question was what to call his new reptile. His original name was "Iguana-saurus" but he then received a letter from William Daniel Conybeare: "Your discovery of the analogy between the Iguana and the fossil teeth is very interesting but the name you propose will hardly do, because it is equally applicable to the recent iguana. Iguanoides or Iguanodon would be better." Mantell took this advice to heart and called his creature Iguanodon.

Years later, Mantell had acquired enough fossil evidence to show that the dinosaur's forelimbs were much shorter than its hind legs, therefore proving they were not built like a mammal as claimed by Sir Richard Owen. Mantell went on to demonstrate that fossil vertebrae, which Owen had attributed to a variety of different species, all belonged to Iguanodon. He also named a new genus of dinosaur called Hylaeosaurus and as a result became an authority on prehistoric reptiles.

== Later years ==
In 1833, Mantell relocated to Brighton but his medical practice suffered. He was almost rendered destitute, but for the town's council, which promptly transformed his house into a museum. There he gave a series of lectures that were published in 1838 with the title The wonders of geology, or, A familiar exposition of geological phenomena: being the substance of a course of lectures delivered at Brighton. The museum in Brighton ultimately failed as a result of Mantell's habit of waiving the entrance fee. Financially destitute, Mantell offered to sell the entire collection to the British Museum in 1838 for £5,000, accepting the counter-offer of £4,000. He moved to Clapham Common in South London, where he continued his work as a doctor.

Mary Mantell left her husband in 1839. That same year, Gideon's son Walter emigrated to New Zealand. Walter later sent his father some important fossils from New Zealand. Gideon's daughter, Hannah, died in 1840.

In 1841 he began to suffer from what would eventually be diagnosed as scoliosis, possibly precipitated by a carriage accident. He got stuck in the reins and was dragged along for 5 miles before arriving at his destination. Despite being bent, crippled and in constant pain, he continued to work with fossilised reptiles and published a number of scientific books and papers until his death in November the 10th 1852. He moved to Pimlico in 1844 and began to take opium, as a painkiller, in 1845.

== Death and legacy ==
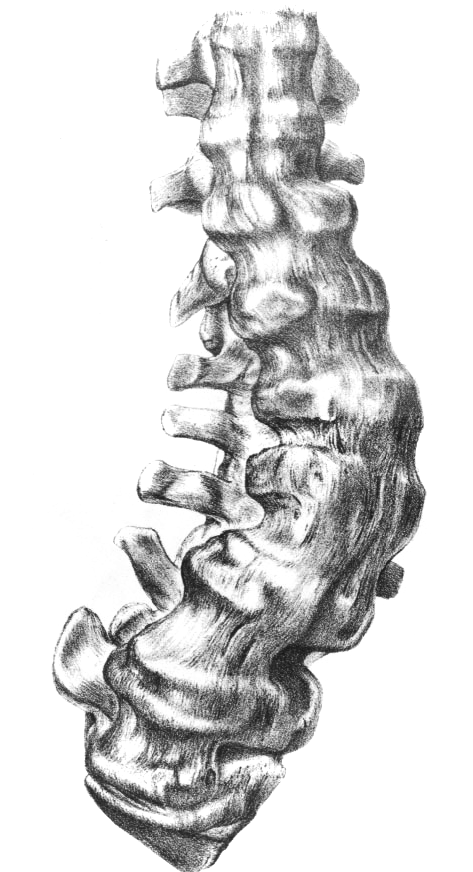
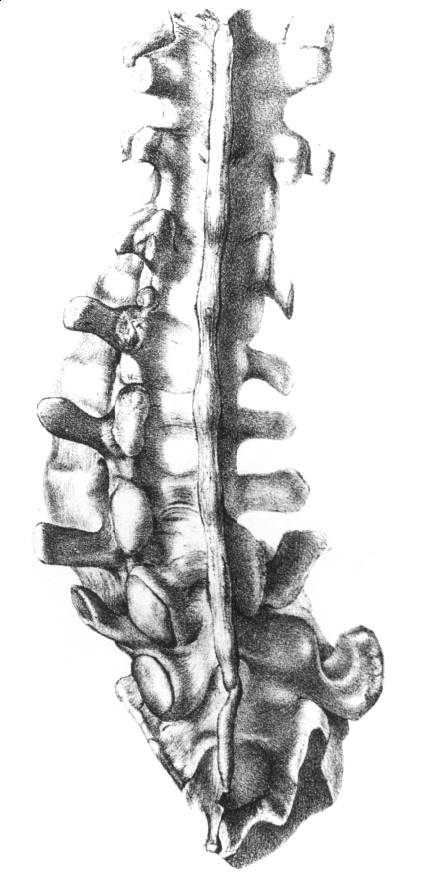
Mantell's deformed spine, drawn as a preserved specimen

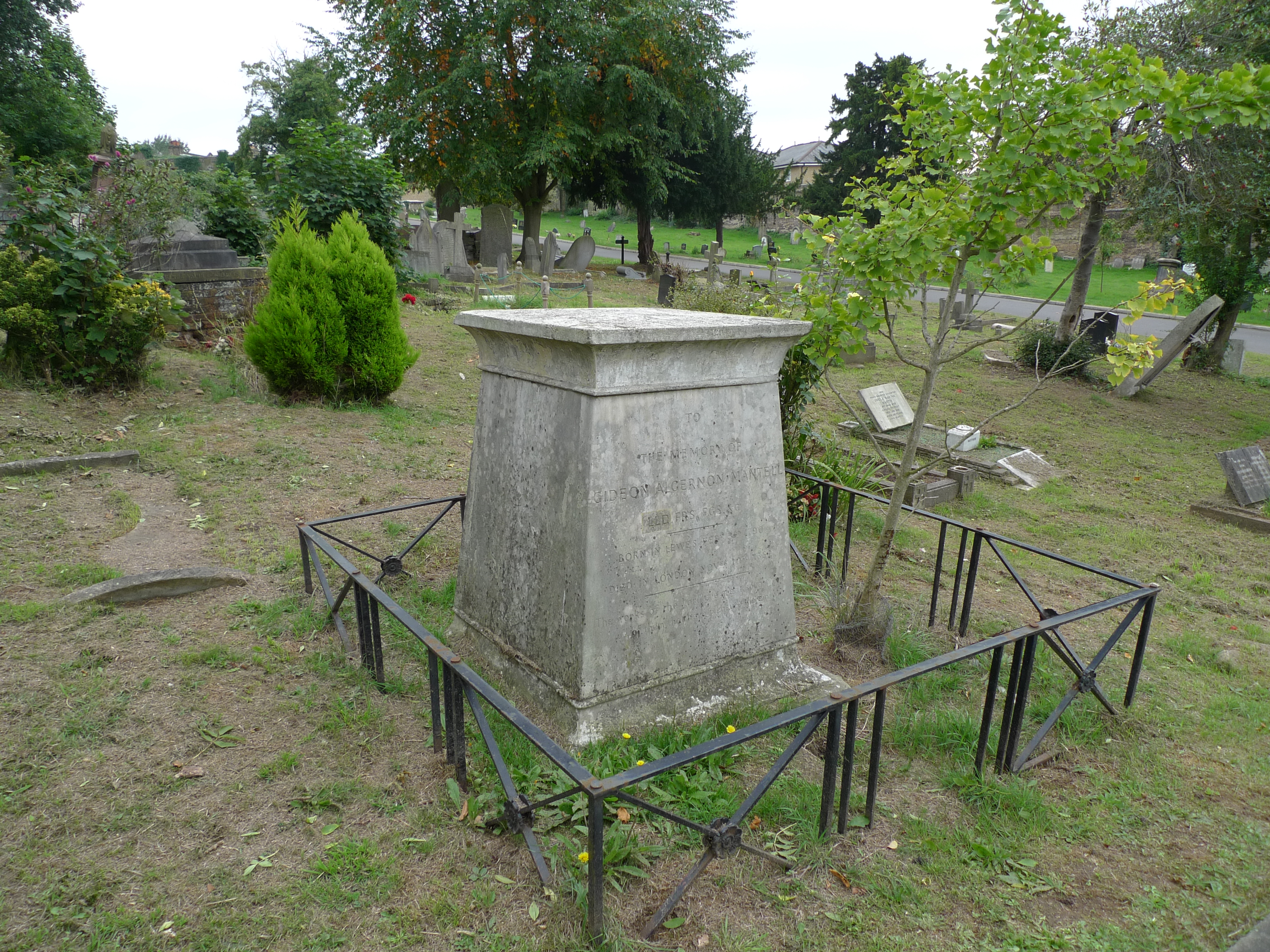
Mantell's tomb in West Norwood Cemetery. It may have been designed by Amon Henry Wilds. It is protected as a Grade II* listed structure.

On 10 November 1852, Mantell took an overdose of opium and later lapsed into a coma. He died that afternoon. His post-mortem by William Adams showed that he had been suffering from severe lumbar scoliosis, leading to the Adams Forward Bend Test as a diagnostic tool. A section of Mantell's spine was removed, preserved and stored on a shelf at the Royal College of Surgeons of England. It remained there until 1969 when it was destroyed due to lack of space.

Mantell's surgery, on the south side of Clapham Common, is now a dental surgery.

At the time of his death Mantell was credited with discovering four of the five genera of dinosaurs then known.

In 2000, in commemoration of Mantell's discovery and his contribution to the science of palaeontology, the Mantell Monument was unveiled at Whiteman's Green, Cuckfield. The monument has been confirmed as the location of the Iguanodon fossils that Mantell first described in 1822.

He is buried at West Norwood Cemetery within a sarcophagus attributed to Amon Henry Wilds that replicates the sanctuary of Natakamani's Temple of Amun. (The name ammonite is, coincidentally, derived from Amun.)

== Works by Mantell ==
Sixty-seven books and memoirs appear in Agassiz and Strickland's Bibliographia Zoologiæ, and forty-eight scientific papers in the Royal Society's Catalogue.

- The Fossils of the South Downs. Royal 4to, 42 plates. London 1822. This was his first book, the plates of which were drawn by his wife. Expensive, at £3. 3/- (three guineas). At double the price, plates were hand-coloured.
- Outlines of the natural history of the environs of Lewes. 4to, 24pp, 3pl. Lewes, 1824.
- Illustrations of the Geology of Sussex, containing figures and descriptions of the fossils of Tilgate Forest. Royal 4to, 20 plates, £2. 15s. 6d. 1827.
- The Geological Age of Reptiles. In Jameson's Edinburgh Philosophical Journal, 1831, Vol. 11, pp. 81–85
- A Narrative of the Visit of their most Gracious Majesties William IV and Queen Adelaide, to the Ancient Borough of Lewes, on the 22nd of October 1830. London: Lupton Relfe, 1831.
- The Geology of the South-East of England. 8vo, with coloured maps, sections, and numerous plates, £1. 1/-. 1833.
- Thoughts on a Pebble. 1836. 8th edition, 1849
- The Wonders of Geology or, a familiar exposition of geological phenomena: being the substance of a course of lectures delivered at Brighton. 2 vols, London, 1838. Lithographic plates drawn by his wife. Data from 4th ed of 1840: vol 1: 428p, frontis & 4 plates; vol 2: pages 429–795 plus appendix, glossary and other material, coloured frontis & 10 coloured plates, most drawn by his wife. Mantell's most extensive work.
- The Medals of Creation. 2 vols, 1844.
- A Day's Ramble in and about the Antient Town of Lewes. London: Henry G. Bohn, 1846.
- Thoughts on Animalcules. small 4to, 144p, 12 coloured plates. London: Murray, 1846. 1850 title: The invisible world revealed by the microscope or, thoughts on animalcules.
- Geological Excursions round the Isle of Wight and along the adjacent Coast of Dorsetshire. 1847.
- Pictorial Atlas of Fossil Remains consisting of coloured Illustration selected from Parkinson's "Organic Remains of Former World" and Arti's "Antediluvian Phytology". London: Bohn. 1850.
- Petrifactions and their teachings. 1851.

== Sources ==
- Cadbury, Deborah (1998). The Dinosaur Hunters: A True Story of Scientific Rivalry and the Discovery of the Prehistoric World. London: Fourth Estate. ISBN 1-85702-959-3.
  - US edition: Terrible Lizard: The First Dinosaur Hunters and the Birth of a New Science. New York: Henry Holt and Company, 2000. ISBN 0-8050-6772-8
- Critchley, Edmund Michäel R. (2010). Dinosaur doctor: the life of Gideon Mantell. Stroud: Amberley. ISBN 978-1-84868-947-3.
- Dean, Dennis R. (1999). Gideon Mantell and the Discovery of Dinosaurs. Cambridge: Cambridge University Press. ISBN 0-521-42048-2.
- Fairbank, J. C. T. (2004). "William Adams and the spine of G. A. Mantell". Annals of the Royal College of Surgeons of England. 86 (5): 349–52. doi:10.1308/147870804245. PMC 1964242. PMID 15333172.
- McGowan, Christopher (2001). The Dragon Seekers: how an extraordinary circle of fossilists discovered the dinosaurs and paved the way for Darwin. Cambridge: Perseus Publishing. ISBN 0-7382-0282-7.
