= 1869 Wallace by-elections =

Two New Zealand by-elections

The 1869 Wallace by-elections were two by-elections held in the Wallace electorate in Southland, following two resignations during the 4th New Zealand Parliament

- Alexander McNeil resigned and was replaced on 30 April by Cuthbert Cowan, who was unopposed. McNeil supported the Stafford Ministry, Cowan did not.
- Cuthbert Cowan resigned and was replaced on 17 September by George Webster. Webster won by six votes over his opponent James Clark Brown, who had been associated with the Gold Fields (though not as an MP) and was a resident of Lawrence.

== Results ==
September 1869 Wallace by-election
Party	Candidate	Votes	%	±%
Independent	George Webster	64	52.46	
Independent	James Clark Brown	58	47.54	
Turnout		122		
Majority		6	4.92	
