= Derek Angus =

New Zealand politician (1938–2024)

Derek Angus QSM

Member of the New Zealand Parliament for Wallace
- In office 1981–1990
- Preceded by: Brian Talboys
- Succeeded by: Bill English

Personal details
- Born: Derek Alan Angus; 21 February 1938 Lumsden, New Zealand
- Died: 2 May 2024 (aged 86) Invercargill, New Zealand
- Party: National Party
- Spouse: Thelma Frances Hazley (m. 1961; died 2014)
- Children: 3
- Occupation: Stock buyer; farmer

Derek Alan Angus QSM (21 February 1938 – 2 May 2024) was a New Zealand politician of the National Party. He served as MP for Wallace from 1981 to 1990.

== Early life and family ==
Angus was born in Lumsden on 21 February 1938, and educated at Waitaki Boys' High School. In 1961, he married Thelma Frances Hazley, and the couple went on to have three children.

Angus played representative rugby union for Northern Southland, West Otago and South Otago. He spent 25 years working as a stock buyer for a freezing company.

== Political career ==
Angus served as a Winton borough councillor for six years. He was later elected to the Southland District Council and the Southland Regional Council in 1989. He was a member of the Guardians of Lakes Te Anau and Manapouri, and served on the Southland Conservation Board.

New Zealand Parliament
Years	Term	Electorate	Party
1981–1984	40th	Wallace	National
1984–1987	41st	Wallace	National
1987–1990	42nd	Wallace	National

Active in the National Party, Angus chaired the Winton branch from 1971 to 1972, and was chair of the Wallace electorate for seven years. He served as a member of the Otago-Southland divisional executive from 1974 to 1981 and was a National Party dominion councillor from 1977 to 1981.

Angus represented the Wallace electorate in Parliament from 1981 to 1990, when he retired. He was replaced by Bill English. During his time in parliament, Angus variously served on the states revision, lands and agriculture, and electoral law reform select committees, and was National Party spokesperson for forestry and lands. He was a New Zealand representative at the 1985 Commonwealth Parliamentary Association conference in London, and at the 1990 Australasian and Pacific regional parliamentary seminar.

In the 1990 Queen's Birthday Honours, Angus was awarded the Queen's Service Medal for public services. The same year, he was awarded the New Zealand 1990 Commemoration Medal.

Angus died in Invercargill on 2 May 2024, at the age of 86, having been predeceased by his wife, Thelma, in 2014.

New Zealand Parliament
Preceded by Brian Talboys	Member of Parliament for Wallace; 1981–1990	Succeeded by Bill English
