= Brian Talboys =

New Zealand deputy prime minister (1975–1981)

The Right Honourable Sir Brian Talboys CH KCB AC
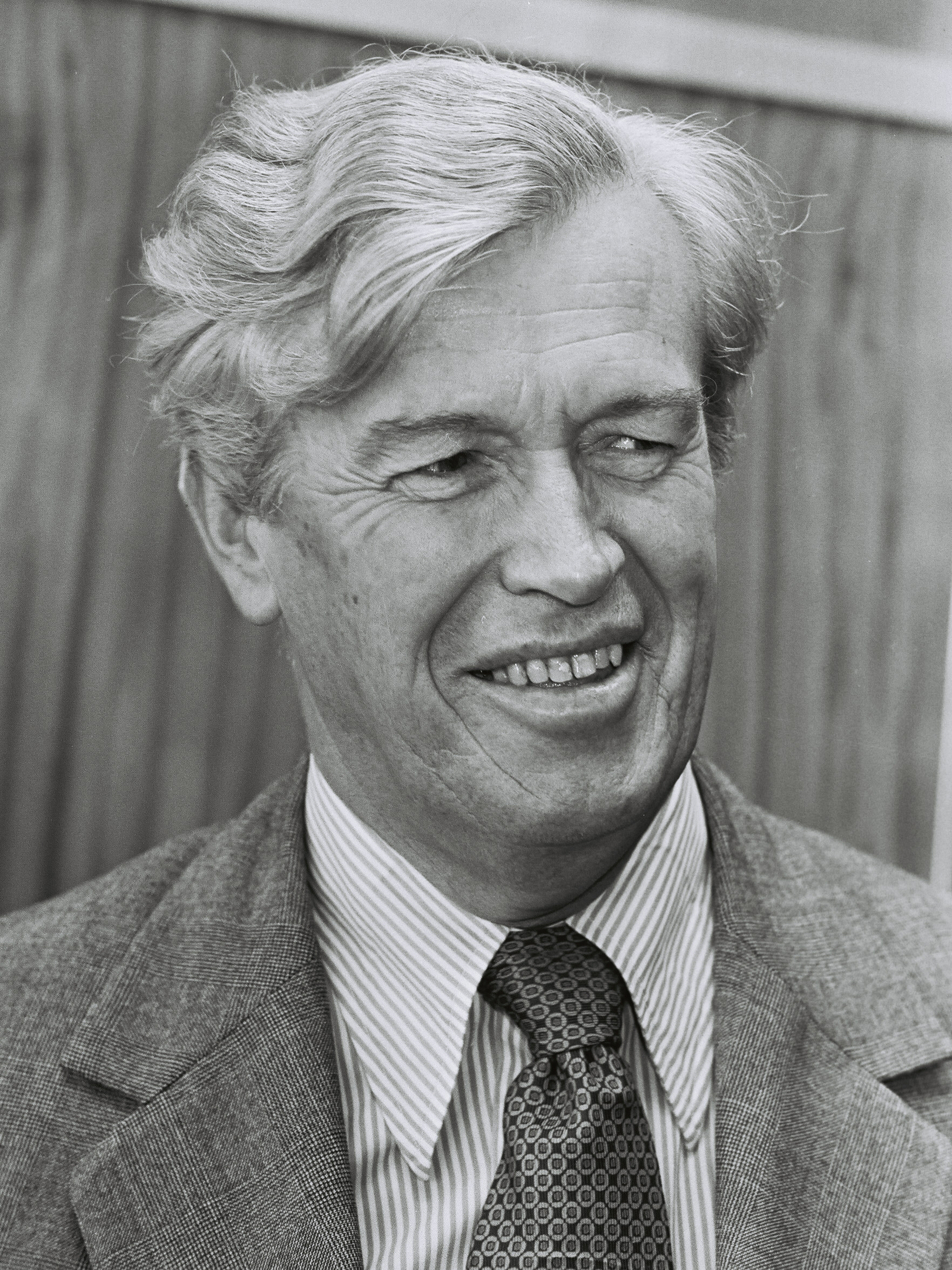
- Talboys in 1978

7th Deputy Prime Minister of New Zealand
- In office 12 December 1975 – 4 March 1981
- Prime Minister: Robert Muldoon
- Preceded by: Bob Tizard
- Succeeded by: Duncan MacIntyre

18th Minister of Foreign Affairs
- In office 12 December 1975 – 11 December 1981
- Prime Minister: Robert Muldoon
- Preceded by: Bill Rowling
- Succeeded by: Warren Cooper

1st Minister of Trade and Industry
- In office 24 October 1972 – 8 December 1972
- Prime Minister: Jack Marshall
- Succeeded by: Warren Freer

24th Minister of Industries and Commerce
- In office 9 February 1972 – 24 October 1972
- Prime Minister: Jack Marshall
- Preceded by: Norman Shelton

29th Minister of Education
- In office 22 December 1969 – 9 February 1972
- Prime Minister: Keith Holyoake
- Preceded by: Arthur Kinsella
- Succeeded by: Lorrie Pickering

18th Minister of Agriculture
- In office 24 January 1962 – 22 December 1969
- Prime Minister: Keith Holyoake
- Preceded by: Thomas Hayman
- Succeeded by: Douglas Carter

Member of the New Zealand Parliament for Wallace
- In office 30 November 1957 – 28 November 1981
- Preceded by: Tom Macdonald
- Succeeded by: Derek Angus

Personal details
- Born: 7 June 1921 Wanganui, New Zealand
- Died: 3 June 2012 (aged 90) Invercargill, New Zealand
- Party: National

Sir Brian Edward Talboys CH KCB AC PC (7 June 1921 – 3 June 2012) was a New Zealand politician who served as the seventh deputy prime minister of New Zealand for the first two terms of Robert Muldoon's premiership. If the abortive "Colonels' Coup" against Muldoon had been successful, Talboys would have become Prime Minister himself.

== Early life ==
Talboys was born in Wanganui on 7 June 1921. He attended primary school in Wanganui and Wanganui Collegiate School, but then travelled to Canada to study at the University of Manitoba. He later returned to New Zealand and studied at Victoria University of Wellington, gaining a BA. For the next few years, he worked for a stock and station agents' company, and then gained a position as assistant editor of a farming newspaper. In World War II, Talboys served in the Royal New Zealand Air Force. After the war, Talboys settled in Southland as a farmer.

== Early political career ==
New Zealand Parliament
| Years | Term | Electorate | Party |
|---|---|---|---|
| 1957–1960 | 32nd | Wallace | National |
| 1960–1963 | 33rd | Wallace | National |
| 1963–1966 | 34th | Wallace | National |
| 1966–1969 | 35th | Wallace | National |
| 1969–1972 | 36th | Wallace | National |
| 1972–1975 | 37th | Wallace | National |
| 1975–1978 | 38th | Wallace | National |
| 1978–1981 | 39th | Wallace | National |

In the 1957 election, Talboys contested the Wallace electorate as the National Party candidate. He was successful, defeating a Labour Party challenger to succeed retiring National MP Tom Macdonald. He held the Wallace electorate for his entire parliamentary career, usually gaining an outright majority. Talboys made a good impression early on as an opposition MP with National's deputy leader Jack Marshall and Labour Prime Minister Walter Nash thinking of him as a future Prime Minister.

At the formation of the Second National Government Talboys was appointed as an under-secretary to the Minister of Industries and Commerce. In 1961 he was one of ten National MPs to vote with the Opposition and remove capital punishment for murder from the Crimes Bill that the National government had introduced.

In 1962, Talboys was elevated to Cabinet, becoming Minister of Agriculture following the death of Thomas Hayman. At the end of 1963, he gained the additional role of Minister of Science. In 1969, he dropped the agriculture portfolio, and became Minister of Education instead. For most of 1972, he was Minister of Industries and Commerce, and Minister of Overseas Trade. He was also briefly Minister of Trade and Industry (which replaced the Industries and Commerce portfolio) towards the end of 1972, but National's loss of the 1972 election ended all his ministerial roles and put him into Opposition.

In 1974, Talboys was elected deputy leader of the National Party following Robert Muldoon's challenge to Jack Marshall. Talboys replaced Muldoon who had been deputy leader. While National was in opposition he was also Shadow Minister of National Development.

When National won the 1975 election, Talboys became Deputy Prime Minister. He also became Minister of Foreign Affairs, Minister of Overseas Trade and Minister of National Development.

During the Third National Government he negotiated New Zealand's continued product access to the United Kingdom when it joined the European Economic Community. He was also involved in creating the Closer Economic Relations agreement with Australia to improve trans-Tasman trading cooperation. Recognising the importance of growing economies in Asia he worked to open up their markets to New Zealand producers.

== Colonels' Coup ==
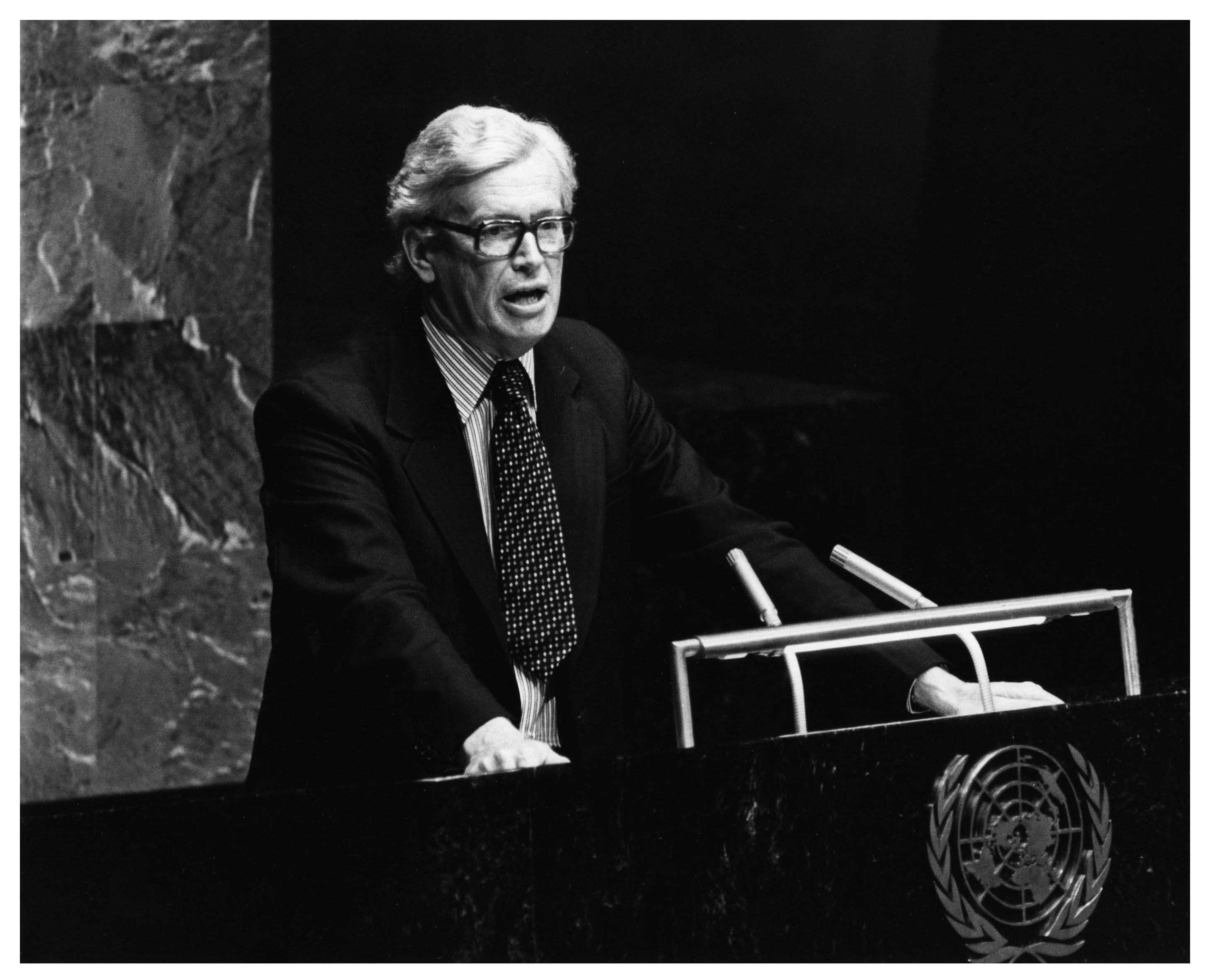
Talboys addressing the UN General Assembly, August 1980.

In 1980, unhappiness was growing in the National Party about the leadership style of Robert Muldoon, who was seen as increasingly confrontational and dictatorial. This dissatisfaction culminated in the so-called "Colonels' Coup", an attempt by certain members of the party to depose Muldoon and install Talboys as leader instead. The dissidents were led by the three most prominent of Muldoon's younger ministers: Jim McLay, Jim Bolger, and Derek Quigley. A number of people were considered as possible replacements, including George Gair and the three "colonels" themselves, but it was eventually decided that Talboys was the only credible challenger, each of the others having been deemed unacceptable by at least one faction of the party. Talboys had been performing well as Acting Prime Minister during Muldoon's absence overseas, and was seen (unlike Muldoon) to be likable and diplomatic.

The largest problem for the plotters was the hesitance of Talboys himself. Talboys, while not particularly supportive of Muldoon's leadership style, refused to actively campaign against his party's leader, and would only make a move if it could be shown beforehand that a majority of the party supported it. While Talboys was willing to accept a leadership change if his colleagues deemed it necessary, he was not willing to actually seek Muldoon's removal himself. Despite Talboys's reluctance, his backers managed to gain a slim majority in caucus in favour of a leadership change. When Muldoon returned to New Zealand, however, he quickly launched a counter-attack, and managed to tip the balance of caucus opinion back towards himself. When the possibility for a leadership vote arrived, Talboys refused to challenge, believing that an open dispute would do huge damage to the party as a whole. No vote was taken, Muldoon remained leader and Talboys remained deputy leader.

Former National leader Jack Marshall, who was also critical of Muldoon's leadership style, thought Talboys would have been a good Prime Minister if he "had a little more steel in his backbone."

== Later life ==
Talboys retired from Parliament at the 1981 election, a year after the abortive leadership challenge. He went on to hold a number of positions in the business world, and served as the first chairman of the Pacific Democratic Union from 1984 to 1985.

He died in 2012 at the age of 90 at his rest home in Invercargill, just a few days short of his 91st birthday. He was survived by his wife and their two children. Patricia, Lady Talboys, died in 2019.

== Honours and awards ==
In 1977, Talboys was awarded the Queen Elizabeth II Silver Jubilee Medal, and in 1990 he received the New Zealand 1990 Commemoration Medal. He was appointed a Member of the Order of the Companions of Honour after he stepped down as deputy prime minister in 1981, an Honorary Companion of the Order of Australia, for service to Australia/New Zealand relations, in the 1982 Australia Day Honours, and Knight Commander of the Order of the Bath, for public services, in the 1991 Queen's Birthday Honours.

== Notes ==
New Zealand Parliament
| Preceded by Tom Macdonald | Member of Parliament for Wallace; 1957–1981 | Succeeded by Derek Angus |
Political offices
| Preceded by Thomas Hayman | Minister of Agriculture; 1962–1969 | Succeeded by Douglas Carter |
| Preceded by Arthur Kinsella | Minister of Education; 1969–1972 | Succeeded by Lorrie Pickering |
| Preceded by Norman Shelton | Minister of Industries and Commerce; 1972 | Position abolished |
| New office | Minister of Trade and Industry; 1972 | Succeeded by Warren Freer |
| Preceded by Bill Rowling | Minister of Foreign Affairs; 1975–1981 | Succeeded by Warren Cooper |
| Preceded by Bob Tizard | Deputy Prime Minister of New Zealand; 1975–1981 | Succeeded by Duncan MacIntyre |
