= Alexander McNeill (New Zealand politician) =

New Zealand politician

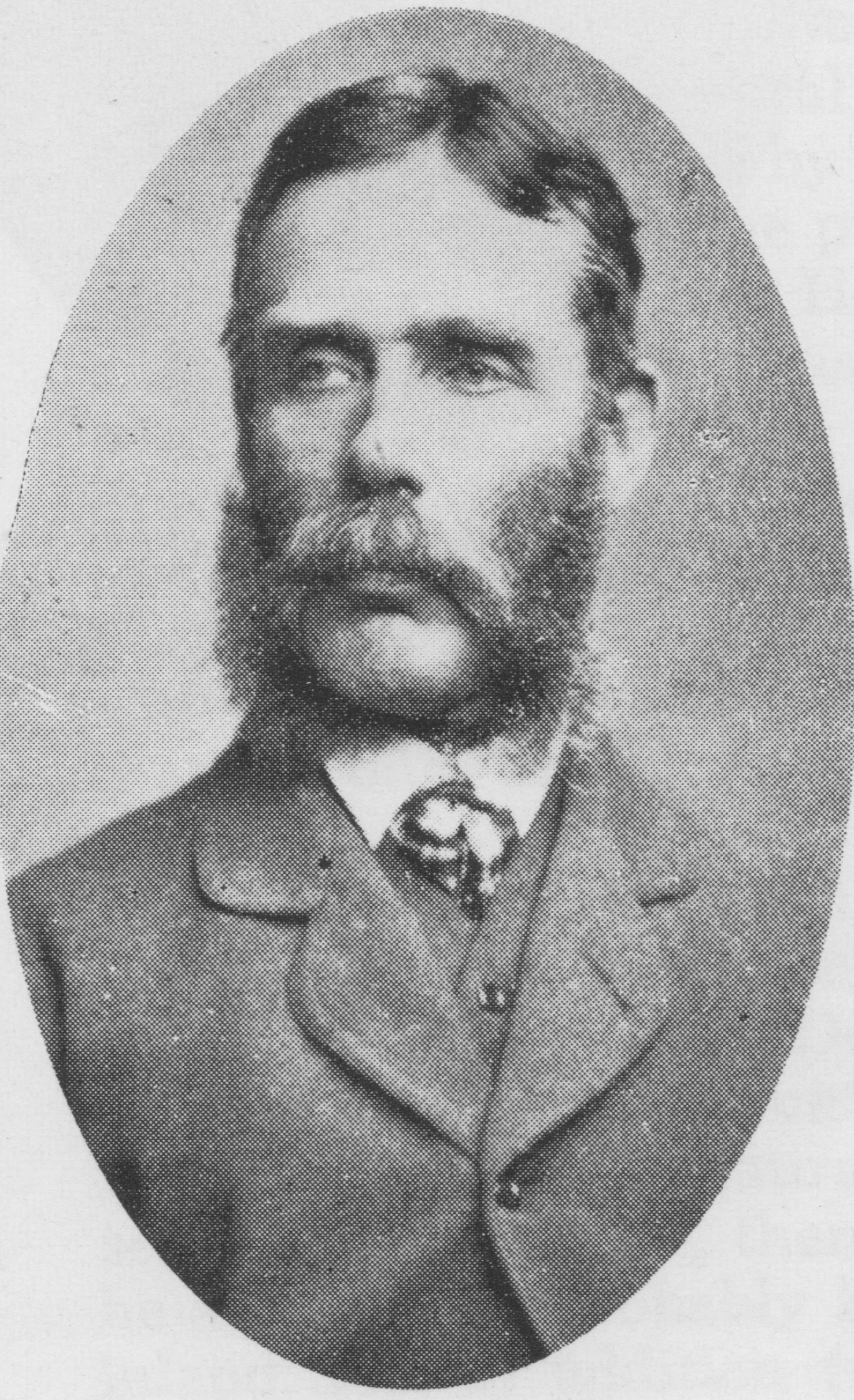
Alexander McNeill

New Zealand Parliament
Years	Term	Electorate	Party
1866–1869	4th	Wallace	Independent

Alexander McNeill (1833 – 17 May 1915) was a 19th-century member of parliament from Southland, New Zealand.

He was the son of Anne Elizabeth McNeill née Carstairs, and Alexander McNeill (1791–1850), brother of Duncan McNeill, Lord Colonsay (1793–1874) and of Sir John McNeill (1795–1883). His own brother was Major General Sir John McNeill VC (1831–1904).

He and his brother John survived the wreck of the Orion in 1850, in which his parents and two sisters lost their lives.

As a member of the Royal Engineers, McNeill participated in the Indian Rebellion of 1857 for the entire conflict. He was wounded in the Siege of Delhi. At Calcutta, he married the daughter of Captain Henry Forrester Leighton; she was also the niece of Sir Archibald Wilson, the commander-in-chief at Delhi.

He retired from the Royal Engineers and came to New Zealand, where he and his brother, Sir Malcolm McNeill, bought Ardlussa Station in Southland. They named it after their family's estate of Ardlussa, on the island of Jura, Scotland.

He represented the Wallace electorate from 1866 to 1869, when he resigned.

From the mid-1880s, he lived in Wanganui, where he died on 17 May 1915. He was buried at Wanganui Cemetery where the inscription describes him as "Chief of the Colonsay Clan".

New Zealand Parliament
Preceded by Dillon Bell; Walter Mantell	Member of Parliament for Wallace; 1866–1869	Succeeded by Cuthbert Cowan
