= George Webster (New Zealand politician) =

New Zealand politician

New Zealand Parliament
Years	Term	Electorate	Party
1869–1870	4th	Wallace	Independent
1871–1875	5th	Wallace	Independent

George Webster (died 15 July 1875) was a 19th-century Member of Parliament from Southland, New Zealand.

In 1860 while in Australia he attempted to found a state trustee in Victoria, similar to the Public Trustee (known as the Public Trust) set up in 1873 by Vogel.

He represented the Wallace electorate from 1869 to 1875, when he died.

He died on 15 July 1875 from an inflammation of the brain after a short illness.

New Zealand Parliament
Preceded by Cuthbert Cowan	Member of Parliament for Wallace; 1869–1875	Succeeded by Christopher Basstian
