= Cuthbert Cowan =

New Zealand politician

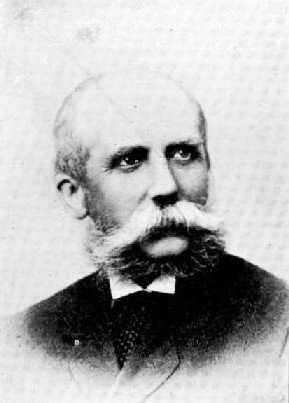
Cowan, circa 1905.

Cuthbert Cowan (1835 – 4 April 1927) was a 19th-century Member of Parliament from Southland, New Zealand.

== Biography ==
=== Political career ===
New Zealand Parliament
Years	Term	Electorate	Party
1869	4th	Wallace	Independent
1884–1887	9th	Hokonui	Independent
1887–1890	10th	Hokonui	Independent

Cowan represented the Wallace electorate in 1869, but he resigned after only three months, and then the Hokonui electorate from 1884 to 1890, when he retired. He unsuccessfully contested the Awarua electorate in both the 1896 general election and the 1897 by-election against Joseph Ward.

=== Death ===
He died on 4 April 1927 in Invercargill aged 92.

New Zealand Parliament
Preceded by Alexander McNeill	Member of Parliament for Wallace; 1869	Succeeded by George Webster
