= John Charles Thomson =

New Zealand politician

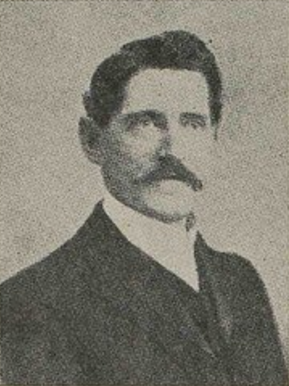
Photograph of John C. Thomson

John Charles Thomson JP (1866 – 9 April 1934) was a New Zealand politician of the Liberal Party.

== Biography ==
New Zealand Parliament
Years	Term	Electorate	Party
1902–1905	15th	Wallace	Liberal
1905–1908	16th	Wallace	Liberal
1908–1911	17th	Wallace	Liberal
1911–1914	18th	Wallace	Liberal
1914–1919	19th	Wallace	Liberal
1922–1925	21st	Wallace	Liberal

Thomson was born in Invercargill in 1866. He was appointed a justice of the peace in 1896. From 1900 to 1903, he was Mayor of Riverton.

He represented the Southland electorate of Wallace from 1902, when he defeated Michael Gilfedder, who was also of the Liberal Party according to Wilson.

In 1919 he was defeated by Adam Hamilton of the Reform Party. He won the seat back in 1922, but retired in 1925, when the seat was again won by Hamilton.

After several years of ill-health, he died at Invercargill on 9 April 1934. He was 67 years old.

== Notes ==
- "Photo of J C Thomson". The Evening Post. 10 April 1934 – via Papers Past.

New Zealand Parliament
Preceded by Michael Gilfedder	Member of Parliament for Wallace; 1902–1919; 1922–1925	Succeeded by Adam Hamilton
Preceded by Adam Hamilton	Member of Parliament for Wallace; 1902–1919; 1922–1925	Succeeded by Adam Hamilton
