= Wallace (electorate) =

Wallace was a New Zealand parliamentary electorate. It was established in 1858, the first election held in 1859, and existed until 1996. From 1861 to 66, it was represented by two members. In total, there were 18 Members of Parliament from the Wallace electorate.

== Population centres ==
The initial 24 New Zealand electorates were defined by Governor George Grey in March 1853, based on the New Zealand Constitution Act 1852 that had been passed by the British government. The Constitution Act also allowed the House of Representatives to establish new electorates, and this was first done in 1858, when four new electorates were formed by splitting existing electorates. Wallace was one of those four electorates, and it was established by splitting the Dunedin Country electorate. Settlements in the initial area were Invercargill, Gore, Mataura, and Riverton.

This electorate was in the rural part of Southland.

== History ==
The first election was held on 30 November 1859 during the term of the 2nd New Zealand Parliament, and was won by Dillon Bell. The electorate was named after Scottish military hero William Wallace.

For the term of the 3rd New Zealand Parliament (1861–66), it was a two-member electorate. From 1866 to its dissolution in 1996, it was a single-member electorate.

In 1938 additional areas added from Central Otago and the West Coast made Wallace the biggest (non-Māori) electorate in New Zealand.

In the 1996 election, the first MMP election, the electorate was combined with the adjacent Clutha electorate into the Clutha-Southland electorate.

=== Members of Parliament ===
Key

Independent Liberal Reform National

Single-member electorate

Election	Winner
1859 election	Dillon Bell

Multi-member electorate

Election	Winners	
1861 election	Dillon Bell	Walter Mantell

Single-member electorate

Election	Winner
1866 election	Alexander McNeill
1st 1869 by-election	Cuthbert Cowan
2nd 1869 by-election	George Webster
1871 election	George Webster
1875 by-election	Christopher Basstian
1875 election	James Joyce
1879 election	Henry Hirst
1881 election	Theophilus Daniel
1884 election	Henry Hirst
1887 election	Samuel Hodgkinson
1890 election	James Mackintosh
1893 election	James Mackintosh
1896 election	Michael Gilfedder
1899 election	Michael Gilfedder
1902 election	John Thomson
1905 election	John Thomson
1908 election	John Thomson
1911 election	John Thomson
1914 election	John Thomson
1919 election	Adam Hamilton
1922 election	John Thomson
1925 election	Adam Hamilton
1928 election	Adam Hamilton
1931 election	Adam Hamilton
1935 election	Adam Hamilton
1938 election	Adam Hamilton
1943 election	Adam Hamilton
1946 election	Tom Macdonald
1949 election	Tom Macdonald
1951 election	Tom Macdonald
1954 election	Tom Macdonald
1957 election	Brian Talboys
1960 election	Brian Talboys
1963 election	Brian Talboys
1966 election	Brian Talboys
1969 election	Brian Talboys
1972 election	Brian Talboys
1975 election	Brian Talboys
1978 election	Brian Talboys
1981 election	Derek Angus
1984 election	Derek Angus
1987 election	Derek Angus
1990 election	Bill English
1993 election	Bill English
(Electorate abolished in 1996; see Clutha-Southland)

== Election results ==
=== 1993 election ===
1993 general election: Wallace
Party	Candidate	Votes	%	±%
National	Bill English	9,832	55.93	−14.59
Labour	Lesley Soper	4,254	24.20	
Alliance	P J Horton	2,359	13.42	
Christian Heritage	J P Stevens	628	3.57	−0.40
Independent	M La Roche	217	1.23	
McGillicuddy Serious	Robyn West	201	1.14	
Natural Law	B Bull	87	0.49	
Majority		5,578	31.73	
Turnout		17,578	79.98	
Registered electors		21,977		

=== 1990 election ===
1990 general election: Wallace
Party	Candidate	Votes	%	±%
National	Bill English	12,243	70.52	
Labour	David Soper	3,357	19.33	
Christian Heritage	J P Stevens	690	3.97	
NewLabour	Marinus La Rooij	556	3.20	
Social Credit	J P Sawyers	366	2.10	
Democrats	Pat Miller	148	0.85	
Majority		8,886	51.18	
Turnout		17,360	82.56	−3.91
Registered electors		21,026		

=== 1987 election ===
1987 general election: Wallace
Party	Candidate	Votes	%	±%
National	Derek Angus	12,323	66.91	+13.85
Labour	Barry Julian	4,729	25.67	
Democrats	M J Radich	1,038	5.63	
Independent	Charmaine Smith	327	1.77	
Majority		7,594	41.23	+11.29
Turnout		18,417	86.47	−4.71
Registered electors		21,298		

=== 1984 election ===
1984 general election: Wallace
Party	Candidate	Votes	%	±%
National	Derek Angus	10,034	53.06	+0.91
Labour	Calvin Fisher	4,371	23.11	
NZ Party	Kevin Phillips	3,270	17.29	
Social Credit	J T Hicks	1,234	6.52	
Majority		5,663	29.94	−4.03
Turnout		18,909	91.18	+1.90
Registered electors		20,737		

=== 1981 election ===
1981 general election: Wallace
Party	Candidate	Votes	%	±%
National	Derek Angus	10,065	52.15	
Social Credit	Owen Horton	3,507	18.17	+1.35
Labour	Ernest Dix	3,143	16.28	
Independent	Aubrey Begg	2,585	13.39	
Majority		6,558	33.97	
Turnout		19,300	89.28	+13.55
Registered electors		21,615		

=== 1978 election ===
1978 general election: Wallace
Party	Candidate	Votes	%	±%
National	Brian Talboys	9,253	49.47	−15.07
Labour	Jim Thomson	3,929	21.00	
Social Credit	Owen Horton	3,147	16.82	+5.74
Independent National	June Slee	2,199	11.75	
Values	C E Henderson	176	0.94	
Majority		5,324	28.46	−14.71
Turnout		18,704	75.73	−9.45
Registered electors		24,698		

=== 1975 election ===
1975 general election: Wallace
Party	Candidate	Votes	%	±%
National	Brian Talboys	10,433	64.54	+12.34
Labour	Ian Lamont	3,455	21.37	−10.99
Social Credit	Owen Horton	1,792	11.08	
Values	John Veitch	484	2.99	
Majority		6,978	43.17	+23.33
Turnout		16,164	85.18	−2.22
Registered electors		18,976		

=== 1972 election ===
1972 general election: Wallace
Party	Candidate	Votes	%	±%
National	Brian Talboys	7,640	52.20	−4.37
Labour	Ian Lamont	4,736	32.36	
Social Credit	F J Williams	1,382	9.44	−5.65
Liberal Reform	A G J McDonald	796	5.43	
New Democratic	I C Lumsden	80	0.54	
Majority		2,904	19.84	−13.68
Turnout		14,634	87.40	+2.75
Registered electors		16,743		

=== 1969 election ===
1969 general election: Wallace
Party	Candidate	Votes	%	±%
National	Brian Talboys	7,646	56.57	+2.82
Labour	J Robson	3,115	23.04	
Social Credit	F J Williams	2,040	15.09	−4.58
Country Party	R J Egerton	714	5.28	
Majority		4,531	33.52	+6.34
Turnout		13,515	84.65	+0.03
Registered electors		15,965		

=== 1966 election ===
1966 general election: Wallace
Party	Candidate	Votes	%	±%
National	Brian Talboys	7,841	53.75	−9.71
Labour	Aubrey Begg	3,876	26.57	
Social Credit	F J Williams	2,870	19.67	+12.01
Majority		3,965	27.18	−13.23
Turnout		14,587	84.62	−1.74
Registered electors		17,238		

=== 1963 election ===
1963 general election: Wallace
Party	Candidate	Votes	%	±%
National	Brian Talboys	9,013	63.46	−5.04
Labour	John Reid	3,272	23.04	
Social Credit	F J Williams	1,088	7.66	
Liberal	V D Stevens	828	5.83	
Majority		5,740	40.41	−4.31
Turnout		14,201	86.36	−2.20
Registered electors		16,443		

=== 1960 election ===
1960 general election: Wallace
Party	Candidate	Votes	%	±%
National	Brian Talboys	8,786	68.50	+5.56
Labour	E Harris	3,050	23.77	
Social Credit	J P Stack	990	7.71	+0.72
Majority		5,736	44.72	+11.84
Turnout		12,826	88.56	−1.90
Registered electors		14,482		

=== 1957 election ===
1957 general election: Wallace
Party	Candidate	Votes	%	±%
National	Brian Talboys	8,266	62.94	
Labour	John Reid	3,947	30.05	
Social Credit	J P Stack	919	6.99	
Majority		4,319	32.88	
Turnout		13,132	90.46	+2.15
Registered electors		14,516		

=== 1954 election ===
1954 general election: Wallace
Party	Candidate	Votes	%	±%
National	Tom Macdonald	7,405	62.22	−8.91
Labour	J W Cleary	2,939	24.69	−4.17
Social Credit	S A Shaw	1,557	13.08	
Majority		4,466	37.52	−4.75
Turnout		11,901	88.31	+0.68
Registered electors		13,476		

=== 1951 election ===
1951 general election: Wallace
Party	Candidate	Votes	%	±%
National	Tom Macdonald	8,515	71.13	+2.72
Labour	J W Cleary	3,455	28.86	
Majority		5,060	42.27	+5.44
Turnout		11,970	87.63	−3.94
Registered electors		13,659		

=== 1949 election ===
1949 general election: Wallace
Party	Candidate	Votes	%	±%
National	Tom Macdonald	8,379	68.41	+3.95
Labour	Herman Victor Freeman	3,868	31.58	
Majority		4,511	36.83	+7.14
Turnout		12,247	91.57	−2.28
Registered electors		13,374		

=== 1946 election ===
1946 general election: Wallace
Party	Candidate	Votes	%	±%
National	Tom Macdonald	8,068	64.46	
Labour	David Johnston Munro	4,352	34.77	
Independent	Leslie A. Murrell	95	0.75	
Majority		3,716	29.69	
Turnout		12,515	93.85	+2.11
Registered electors		13,334		

=== 1943 election ===
1943 general election: Wallace
Party	Candidate	Votes	%	±%
National	Adam Hamilton	4,738	55.03	+1.03
Labour	John James Lynch	3,131	36.36	−9.13
Independent	Patrick McMullan	675	7.84	
Informal votes		65	0.75	+0.25
Majority		1,607	18.66	+10.15
Turnout		8,609	91.74	−0.96
Registered electors		9,384		

=== 1938 election ===
1938 general election: Wallace
Party	Candidate	Votes	%	±%
National	Adam Hamilton	5,353	54.00	+3.34
Labour	John James Lynch	4,509	45.49	
Informal votes		50	0.50	−0.08
Majority		844	8.51	−13.53
Turnout		9,912	92.70	+1.33
Registered electors		10,692		

=== 1935 election ===
1935 general election: Wallace
Party	Candidate	Votes	%	±%
Reform	Adam Hamilton	4,674	50.66	−17.16
Labour	Lawrence Edmond	2,640	28.61	
Democrat	William Hinchey	1,821	19.73	
Independent Labour	Thomas Rewcastle	91	0.98	
Informal votes		54	0.58	−0.31
Majority		2,034	22.04	−13.60
Turnout		9,226	91.37	+9.06
Registered electors		10,097		

=== 1931 election ===
1931 general election: Wallace
Party	Candidate	Votes	%	±%
Reform	Adam Hamilton	5,408	67.82	+19.03
Independent	Peter Gilfedder	2,566	32.18	
Informal votes		72	0.89	−0.19
Majority		2,842	35.64	+35.42
Turnout		8,046	82.31	−9.38
Registered electors		9,775		

=== 1928 election ===
1928 general election: Wallace
Party	Candidate	Votes	%	±%
Reform	Adam Hamilton	4,360	48.79	−4.66
United	Walter Taylor	4,340	48.56	
Independent Liberal	George Pulley	139	1.55	
Informal votes		97	1.08	−0.28
Majority		20	0.22	−17.52
Turnout		8,936	91.69	+1.43
Registered electors		9,745		

=== 1925 election ===
1925 general election: Wallace
Party	Candidate	Votes	%	±%
Reform	Adam Hamilton	4,001	53.45	+5.19
Labour	James Morris MacKenzie	2,673	35.71	
Liberal	George Shepherd Edie	432	5.77	
Independent Liberal	Peter Gilfedder	277	3.70	
Informal votes		102	1.36	+0.76
Majority		1,328	17.74	+14.87
Turnout		7,485	93.12	+5.02
Registered electors		8,038		

=== 1922 election ===
1922 general election: Wallace
Party	Candidate	Votes	%	±%
Liberal	John Thomson	3,646	51.13	+2.02
Reform	Adam Hamilton	3,441	48.26	−1.60
Informal votes		43	0.60	−0.41
Majority		205	2.87	
Turnout		7,130	88.10	+5.37
Registered electors		8,093		

=== 1919 election ===
1919 general election: Wallace
Party	Candidate	Votes	%	±%
Reform	Adam Hamilton	2,843	49.86	
Liberal	John Thomson	2,800	49.11	−9.37
Informal votes		58	1.01	−0.01
Majority		43	0.75	
Turnout		5,701	82.73	−0.59
Registered electors		6,891		

=== 1914 election ===
1914 general election: Wallace
Party	Candidate	Votes	%	±%
Liberal	John Thomson	3,036	58.48	
Reform	Alexander Rodger	2,155	41.51	
Informal votes		53	1.02	
Majority		881	16.97	
Turnout		5,191	83.32	
Registered electors		6,230		

=== 1899 election ===
1899 general election: Wallace
Party	Candidate	Votes	%	±%
Liberal	Michael Gilfedder	1,896	53.06	+26.73
Conservative	Allen Carmichael	1,677	46.94	
Majority		219	6.13	3.71
Turnout		3,573	78.05	1.46
Registered electors		4,578		

=== 1896 election ===
1896 general election: Wallace
Party	Candidate	Votes	%	±%
Liberal	Michael Gilfedder	756	26.33	
Liberal	Rev. Thomas Neave	640	22.29	
Conservative	Hugh Valentine	585	20.38	
Conservative	Henry Hirst	487	16.96	
Liberal	James Mackintosh	403	14.04	
Majority		116	4.04	
Registered electors		3,927		

=== 1890 election ===
1890 general election: Wallace
Party	Candidate	Votes	%	±%
Liberal	James Mackintosh	675	44.47	
Conservative	Samuel Hodgkinson	497	32.74	
Independent	Henry Hirst	346	22.79	
Majority		178	11.72	
Turnout		1,518	54.31	
Registered electors		2,795		

=== 1875 by-election ===
1875 Wallace by-election
Party	Candidate	Votes	%	±%
Independent	Christopher Basstian	57	48.72	
Independent	Robert Cameron	38	32.48	
Independent	Dr Francis Alexander Monckton	22	18.80	
Majority		19	16.24	
Turnout		117		
