= List of prime ministers of New Zealand =

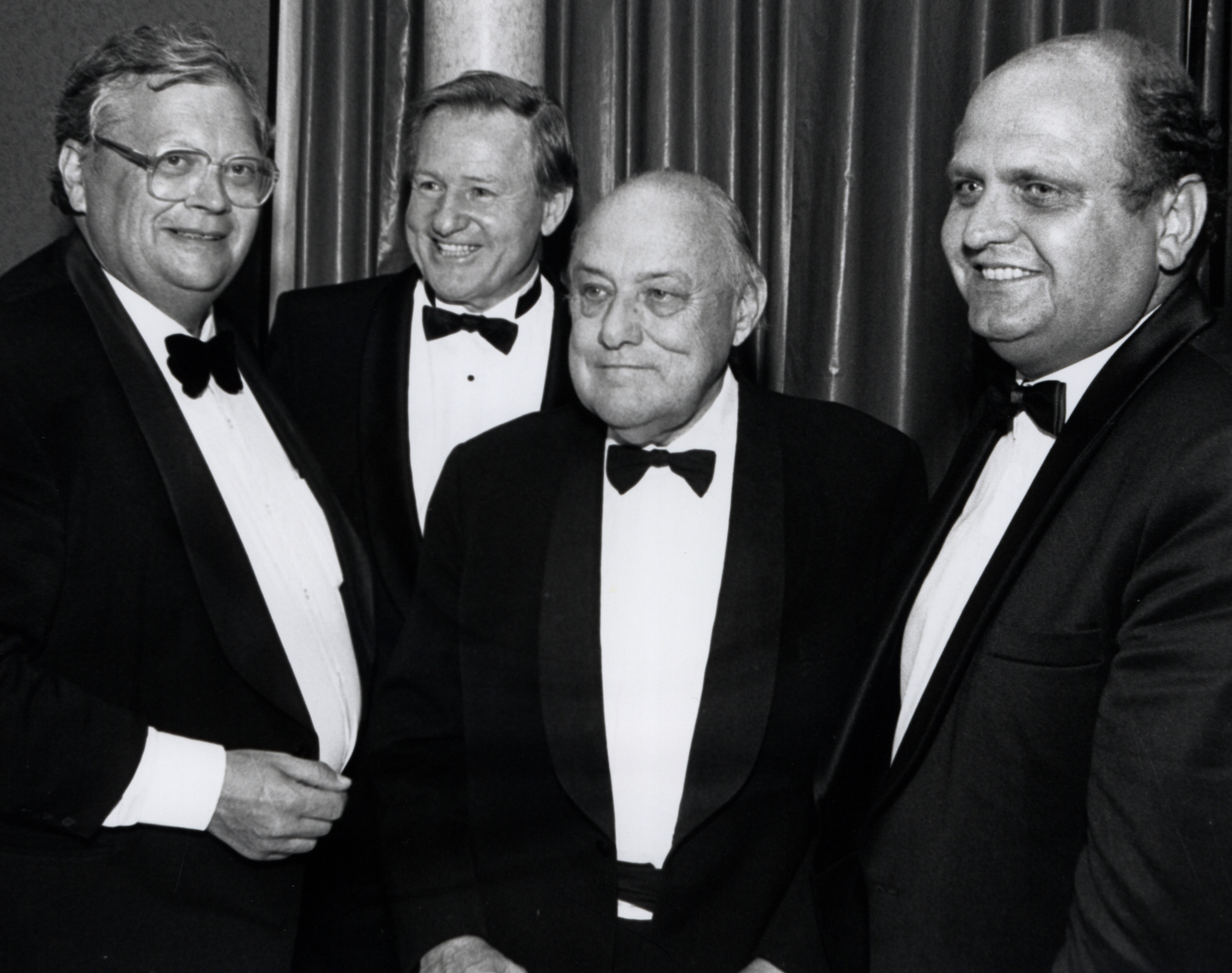
Four New Zealand prime ministers pictured in 1992 (from left) – David Lange, Jim Bolger, Robert Muldoon and Mike Moore

The prime minister of New Zealand is the country's head of government and the leader of the Cabinet, whose powers and responsibilities are defined by convention. Officially, the prime minister is appointed by the governor-general, but by convention, the prime minister must have the confidence of the House of Representatives. The prime minister is always a member of parliament.

Originally, prime ministers headed loose coalitions of independents, which were often unstable; since the advent of political parties, the prime minister is usually the leader of the largest party represented in the house. Since 1935, every prime minister has been a member of either the National party or the Labour party, reflecting their domination of New Zealand politics. After the introduction of mixed-member proportional voting in 1996, prime ministers have usually needed to negotiate agreements with smaller parties to maintain a majority in Parliament.

The title of the office was originally "colonial secretary", which was formally changed to "premier" in 1869. That title remained in use almost exclusively for more than 30 years, until Richard Seddon changed it to "prime minister" during his tenure in the office; he used the title officially at the 1902 Colonial Conference.

Some historians regard James FitzGerald as New Zealand's first prime minister, although a more conventional view is that neither he nor his successor (Thomas Forsaith) should properly be given that title, as New Zealand did not yet have responsible government when they served. Most commonly, Henry Sewell, who served during 1856, is regarded as New Zealand's first premier. Since then, a total of 42 individuals have so far held the premiership, not including Hugh Watt, who was acting prime minister following the death of Norman Kirk. Eight prime ministers have held the position for more than one period in office. Richard Seddon, prime minister for thirteen years between 1893 and 1906, held the office for the longest term. The youngest prime minister was Edward Stafford, who assumed office at age 37, and the oldest was Walter Nash, who left office at age 78. Three prime ministers have been women, a count equalled by Finland, Lithuania, Poland and the United Kingdom, and only surpassed by Switzerland.

The current prime minister is Christopher Luxon, who assumed office on 27 November 2023.

== List of prime ministers ==
The parties shown are those to which the heads of government belonged at the time they held office and the electoral districts shown are those they represented while in office. Several prime ministers belonged to parties other than those given and represented other electorates before and after their time in office. A number in brackets indicates the prime minister served a previous term in office.

Political parties

Independent
Liberal
Reform
United
Labour
National

Status

Denotes acting prime minister

Symbols

^{†} Died in office

Colonial Secretaries (1856–1869)
No.	Portrait	Name Constituency (Birth–Death)	Election (Parliament)	Term of office			Political party	Government
No.	Portrait	Name Constituency (Birth–Death)	Election (Parliament)	Took office	Left office	Time in office	Political party	Government
1		The Honourable; Henry Sewell; MP for Christchurch (1807–1879)	1855 (2nd)	7 May 1856	20 May 1856	14 days	Independent	Sewell
2		The Right Honourable; Sir William Fox; KCMG; MP for Wanganui and Rangitikei (1812–1893)	– (2nd)	20 May 1856	2 June 1856	14 days	Independent	Fox I
3		The Right Honourable; Sir Edward Stafford; GCMG; MP for Nelson (1819–1901)	– (2nd)	2 June 1856	12 July 1861	5 years, 41 days	Independent	Stafford I
(2)		The Right Honourable; Sir William Fox; KCMG; MP for Rangitikei (1812–1893)	1860–1861 (3rd)	12 July 1861	6 August 1862	1 year, 26 days	Independent	Fox II
4		The Honourable; Alfred Domett; MP for Nelson (1811–1887)	– (3rd)	6 August 1862	30 October 1863	1 year, 86 days	Independent	Domett
5		The Honourable; Sir Frederick Whitaker; KCMG; Councillor (1812–1891)	– (3rd)	30 October 1863	24 November 1864	1 year, 26 days	Independent	Whitaker–Fox
6		The Honourable; Sir Frederick Weld; GCMG; MP for Cheviot (1823–1891)	– (3rd)	24 November 1864	16 October 1865	327 days	Independent	Weld
(3)		The Right Honourable; Sir Edward Stafford; GCMG; MP for Nelson until 1868; MP for Timaru from 1868 (1819–1901)	– (3rd); 1866 (4th)	16 October 1865	28 June 1869	3 years, 256 days	Independent	Stafford II

Premiers and prime ministers (1869–present)
No.	Portrait	Name Constituency (Birth–Death)	Election (Parliament)	Term of office			Political party	Government
No.	Portrait	Name Constituency (Birth–Death)	Election (Parliament)	Took office	Left office	Time in office	Political party	Government
(2)		The Right Honourable; Sir William Fox; KCMG; MP for Rangitikei (1812–1893)	– (4th); 1871 (5th)	28 June 1869	10 September 1872	3 years, 75 days	Independent	Fox III
(3)		The Right Honourable; Sir Edward Stafford; GCMG; MP for Timaru (1819–1901)	– (5th)	10 September 1872	11 October 1872	32 days	Independent	Stafford III
7		The Right Honourable; George Waterhouse; Councillor (1824–1906)	– (5th)	11 October 1872	3 March 1873	144 days	Independent	Waterhouse
(2)		The Right Honourable; Sir William Fox; KCMG; MP for Rangitikei (1812–1893)	– (5th)	3 March 1873	8 April 1873	37 days	Independent	Fox IV
8		The Right Honourable; Sir Julius Vogel; KCMG; MP for Auckland East (1835–1899)	– (5th)	8 April 1873	6 July 1875	2 years, 90 days	Independent	Vogel I
9		The Honourable; Daniel Pollen; Councillor (1813–1896)	– (5th)	6 July 1875	15 February 1876	225 days	Independent	Pollen
(8)		The Right Honourable; Sir Julius Vogel; KCMG; MP for Wanganui (1835–1899)	1875–1876 (6th)	15 February 1876	1 September 1876	200 days	Independent	Vogel II
10		The Honourable; Sir Harry Atkinson; KCMG; MP for Egmont (1831–1892)	– (6th)	1 September 1876	13 October 1877	1 year, 43 days	Independent	Atkinson I • II "Continuous Ministry"
11		The Right Honourable; Sir George Grey; KCB; MP for Thames (1812–1898)	– (6th)	13 October 1877	8 October 1879	1 year, 361 days	Independent	Grey
12		The Honourable; Sir John Hall; KCMG; MP for Selwyn (1824–1907)	1879 (7th); 1881 (8th)	8 October 1879	21 April 1882	2 years, 196 days	Independent	Hall "Continuous Ministry"
(5)		The Honourable; Sir Frederick Whitaker; KCMG; Councillor (1812–1891)	– (8th)	21 April 1882	25 September 1883	1 year, 158 days	Independent	Whitaker "Continuous Ministry"
(10)		The Honourable; Sir Harry Atkinson; KCMG; MP for Egmont (1831–1892)	– (8th)	25 September 1883	16 August 1884	327 days	Independent	Atkinson III "Continuous Ministry"
13		The Right Honourable; Robert Stout; KCMG; MP for Dunedin East (1844–1930)	1884 (9th)	16 August 1884	28 August 1884	13 days	Independent	Stout–Vogel
(10)		The Honourable; Sir Harry Atkinson; KCMG; MP for Egmont (1831–1892)	– (9th)	28 August 1884	3 September 1884	7 days	Independent	Atkinson IV "Continuous Ministry"
(13)		The Right Honourable; Sir Robert Stout; KCMG; MP for Dunedin East (1844–1930)	– (9th)	3 September 1884	8 October 1887	3 years, 36 days	Independent	Stout–Vogel
(10)		The Honourable; Sir Harry Atkinson; KCMG; MP for Egmont (1831–1892)	1887 (10th)	8 October 1887	24 January 1891	3 years, 109 days	Independent	Atkinson V "Scarecrow Ministry"
14		The Right Honourable; John Ballance; MP for Wanganui (1839–1893)	1890 (11th)	24 January 1891	27 April 1893^{[†]}	2 years, 94 days	Liberal	Liberal
15		The Right Honourable; Richard Seddon; MP for Westland (1845–1906)	– (11th); 1893 (12th); 1896 (13th); 1899 (14th); 1902 (15th); 1905 (16th)	1 May 1893	10 June 1906^{[†]}	13 years, 41 days	Liberal	Liberal
16		The Honourable; William Hall-Jones; KCMG; MP for Timaru (1851–1936)	– (16th)	21 June 1906	6 August 1906	47 days	Liberal	Liberal
17		The Right Honourable; Sir Joseph Ward; BtGCMG; MP for Awarua (1856–1930)	– (16th); 1908 (17th); 1911 (18th)	6 August 1906	12 March 1912	5 years, 220 days	Liberal	Liberal; C&S with IPLL 1908–1910; Labour 1910–1912; independents 1911–1912
18		The Right Honourable; Thomas Mackenzie; GCMG; MP for Egmont (1853–1930)	– (18th)	28 March 1912	10 July 1912	105 days	Liberal	Liberal; C&S with IPLL 1908–1910; Labour 1910–1912; independents 1911–1912
19		The Right Honourable; William Massey; MP for Franklin (1856–1925)	– (18th); 1914 (19th); 1919 (20th); 1922 (21st)	10 July 1912	10 May 1925^{[†]}	12 years, 305 days	Reform	Reform with Liberal 1915–1919; C&S with independents
20		The Right Honourable; Francis Bell; GCMGKC; Councillor (1851–1936)	– (21st)	14 May 1925	30 May 1925	17 days	Reform	Reform with Liberal 1915–1919; C&S with independents
21		The Right Honourable; Gordon Coates; MC*; MP for Kaipara (1878–1943)	– (21st); 1925 (22nd)	30 May 1925	10 December 1928	3 years, 195 days	Reform	Reform with Liberal 1915–1919; C&S with independents
(17)		The Right Honourable; Sir Joseph Ward; BtGCMG; MP for Invercargill (1856–1930)	1928 (23rd)	10 December 1928	28 May 1930	1 year, 170 days	United	United with Labour; C&S with independents
22		The Right Honourable; George Forbes; MP for Hurunui (1869–1947)	– (23rd)	28 May 1930	6 December 1935	5 years, 193 days	United	United with Labour; C&S with independents
22		The Right Honourable; George Forbes; MP for Hurunui (1869–1947)	1931 (24th)	28 May 1930	6 December 1935	5 years, 193 days	United	United–Reform Coalition
23		The Right Honourable; Michael Joseph Savage; MP for Auckland West (1872–1940)	1935 (25th); 1938 (26th)	6 December 1935	27 March 1940^{[†]}	4 years, 113 days	Labour	First Labour; C&S with Rātana 1935–1936; independents 1935–1946
24		The Right Honourable; Peter Fraser; CH; MP for Wellington Central until 1946; MP for Brooklyn from 1946 (1884–1950)	– (26th); 1943 (27th); 1946 (28th)	1 April 1940	13 December 1949	9 years, 257 days	Labour	First Labour; C&S with Rātana 1935–1936; independents 1935–1946
25		The Right Honourable; Sir Sidney Holland; GCMGCH; MP for Fendalton (1893–1961)	1949 (29th); 1951 (30th); 1954 (31st)	13 December 1949	20 September 1957	7 years, 282 days	National	First National
26		The Right Honourable; Sir Keith Holyoake; KGGCMGCHQSOKStJ; MP for Pahiatua (1904–1983)	– (31st)	20 September 1957	12 December 1957	84 days	National	First National
27		The Right Honourable; Sir Walter Nash; GCMGCH; MP for Hutt (1882–1968)	1957 (32nd)	12 December 1957	12 December 1960	3 years, 1 day	Labour	Second Labour
(26)		The Right Honourable; Sir Keith Holyoake; KGGCMGCHQSOKStJ; MP for Pahiatua (1904–1983)	1960 (33rd); 1963 (34th); 1966 (35th); 1969 (36th)	12 December 1960	7 February 1972	11 years, 58 days	National	Second National
28		The Right Honourable; Sir Jack Marshall; GBECHED; MP for Karori (1912–1988)	– (36th)	7 February 1972	8 December 1972	306 days	National	Second National
29		The Right Honourable; Norman Kirk; MP for Sydenham (1923–1974)	1972 (37th)	8 December 1972	31 August 1974^{[†]}	1 year, 267 days	Labour	Third Labour
—		The Right Honourable; Hugh Watt; JP; MP for Onehunga (1912–1980); Acting prime minister	– (37th)	31 August 1974	6 September 1974	7 days	Labour	Third Labour
30		The Right Honourable; Sir Bill Rowling; KCMG; MP for Tasman (1927–1995)	– (37th)	6 September 1974	12 December 1975	1 year, 98 days	Labour	Third Labour
31		The Right Honourable; Sir Robert Muldoon; GCMGCH; MP for Tamaki (1921–1992)	1975 (38th); 1978 (39th); 1981 (40th)	12 December 1975	26 July 1984	8 years, 228 days	National	Third National
32		The Right Honourable; David Lange; ONZCH; MP for Mangere (1942–2005)	1984 (41st); 1987 (42nd)	26 July 1984	8 August 1989	5 years, 14 days	Labour	Fourth Labour
33		The Right Honourable; Sir Geoffrey Palmer; KCMGACKC; MP for Christchurch Central (born 1942)	– (42nd)	8 August 1989	4 September 1990	1 year, 28 days	Labour	Fourth Labour
34		The Right Honourable; Mike Moore; ONZAO; MP for Christchurch North (1949–2020)	– (42nd)	4 September 1990	2 November 1990	60 days	Labour	Fourth Labour
35		The Right Honourable; Jim Bolger; ONZ; MP for King Country (1935–2025)	1990 (43rd); 1993 (44th); 1996 (45th)	2 November 1990	8 December 1997	7 years, 37 days	National	Fourth National with Right of Centre 1994–1995; United NZ 1995–1996; New Zealand First 1996–1998; Mauri Pacific, Mana Wahine, independents 1998–1999; C&S with Future 1994–1995; Christian Democrats 1995–1996; United NZ 1995–1995, 1998–1999; ACT, independents 1998–1999
36		The Right Honourable; Dame Jenny Shipley; DNZM; MP for Rakaia (born 1952)	– (45th)	8 December 1997	10 December 1999	2 years, 3 days	National	Fourth National with Right of Centre 1994–1995; United NZ 1995–1996; New Zealand First 1996–1998; Mauri Pacific, Mana Wahine, independents 1998–1999; C&S with Future 1994–1995; Christian Democrats 1995–1996; United NZ 1995–1995, 1998–1999; ACT, independents 1998–1999
37		The Right Honourable; Helen Clark; ONZSSI; MP for Mount Albert (born 1950)	1999 (46th); 2002 (47th); 2005 (48th)	10 December 1999	19 November 2008	8 years, 346 days	Labour	Fifth Labour with Alliance 1999–2002, Progressives 2002–2008; C&S with Greens 1999–2002, Cooperation Agreement 2005–2008; C&S with New Zealand First 2005–2008; United Future 2002–2008
38		The Right Honourable; Sir John Key; GNZMAC; MP for Helensville (born 1961)	2008 (49th); 2011 (50th); 2014 (51st)	19 November 2008	12 December 2016	8 years, 24 days	National	Fifth National; C&S with ACT, United Future, Māori
39		The Right Honourable; Sir Bill English; KNZM; List MP (born 1961)	– (51st)	12 December 2016	26 October 2017	319 days	National	Fifth National; C&S with ACT, United Future, Māori
40		The Right Honourable; Dame Jacinda Ardern; GNZM; MP for Mount Albert (born 1980)	2017 (52nd); 2020 (53rd)	26 October 2017	25 January 2023	5 years, 91 days	Labour	Sixth Labour with New Zealand First 2017–2020; C&S with Greens 2017–2020; Cooperation with Greens 2020–2023
41		The Right Honourable; Chris Hipkins; MP for Remutaka (born 1978)	– (53rd)	25 January 2023	27 November 2023	306 days	Labour	Sixth Labour with New Zealand First 2017–2020; C&S with Greens 2017–2020; Cooperation with Greens 2020–2023
42		The Right Honourable; Christopher Luxon; MP for Botany (born 1970)	2023 (54th)	27 November 2023	Incumbent	2 years, 298 days	National	Sixth National with ACT, New Zealand First 2023–present

== See also ==
- List of prime ministers of New Zealand by place of birth
- List of prime ministers of Queen Victoria
- List of prime ministers of Edward VII
- List of prime ministers of George V
- List of prime ministers of Edward VIII
- List of prime ministers of George VI
- List of prime ministers of Elizabeth II
- List of prime ministers of Charles III
