= List of prime ministers of the United Kingdom by birthplace =

This list give the names of British prime ministers by their birthplace.

48 of the past 59 prime ministers were born in England, including the incumbent Andy Burnham. Of them, nineteen were born in Central London, most recently Keir Starmer (2024–2026). The rest were born in Scotland (7), Republic of Ireland (2), Canada (1), and United States (1). The most recent prime minister born in Scotland was Gordon Brown (2007–2010).

David Lloyd George was Welsh and a first-language Welsh speaker, but was born in England. No prime minister has ever been born in Wales or in Northern Ireland.

Four prime ministers were born outside the modern United Kingdom, the most recent being Boris Johnson (2019–2022).

== List ==
Name	Term	Birthplace	Country
Robert Walpole	1721 to 1742	Houghton Hall, Norfolk	England
Earl of Wilmington	1742 to 1743	Compton Wynyates, Warwickshire	England
Henry Pelham	1743 to 1756	Laughton, Sussex	England
Duke of Newcastle	1754 to 1756 1757 to 1762	London	England
Duke of Devonshire	1756 to 1757	Hardwicke, Stroud	England
Earl of Bute	1762 to 1763	Parliament Square, Edinburgh	Scotland
George Grenville	1763 to 1765	Wotton, Buckinghamshire	England
Marquess of Rockingham	1765 to 1766, 1782	Wentworth, South Yorkshire	England
Earl of Chatham	1766 to 1768	Westminster, London	England
Duke of Grafton	1768 to 1770	London	England
Lord North	1770 to 1782	Piccadilly, London	England
Earl of Shelburne	1782 to 1783	Dublin, County Dublin	Kingdom of Ireland, modern day Republic of Ireland
Duke of Portland	1783 1807 to 1809	Bulstrode Park, Buckinghamshire	England
William Pitt	1783 to 1801 1804 to 1806	Hayes, Kent	England
Henry Addington	1801 to 1804	Holborn, London	England
Lord Grenville	1806 to 1807	Wotton, Buckinghamshire	England
Spencer Perceval	1809 to 1812	Mayfair, London	England
Earl of Liverpool	1812 to 1827	London	England
George Canning	1827	Marylebone, London	England
Viscount Goderich	1827 to 1828	Skelton-on-Ure, Yorkshire	England
Duke of Wellington	1828 to 1830 1834	Dublin, County Dublin	Kingdom of Ireland, modern day Republic of Ireland
Earl Grey	1830 to 1834	Fallodon, Northumberland	England
Viscount Melbourne	1834 1835 to 1841	London	England
Sir Robert Peel	1834 to 1835 1841 to 1846	Bury, Lancashire	England
Lord John Russell	1846 to 1852 1865 to 1866	Mayfair, Middlesex	England
Earl of Derby	1852 1858 to 1859 1866 to 1868	Knowsley Hall, Knowsley, Lancashire	England
Earl of Aberdeen	1852 to 1855	Edinburgh, Midlothian	Scotland
Viscount Palmerston	1855 to 1858 1859 to 1865	Westminster, Middlesex	England
Benjamin Disraeli	1868 1874 to 1880	Bloomsbury, Middlesex	England
William Ewart Gladstone	1868 to 1874 1880 to 1885 1886 1892 to 1894	Liverpool, Lancashire	England
Marquess of Salisbury	1885 to 1886 1886 to 1892 1895 to 1902	Hatfield, Hertfordshire	England
Earl of Rosebery	1894 to 1895	Mayfair, Middlesex	England
Arthur Balfour	1902 to 1905	Whittingehame, East Lothian	Scotland
Sir Henry Campbell-Bannerman	1905 to 1908	Kelvinside, Glasgow	Scotland
H. H. Asquith	1908 to 1916	Morley, West Riding of Yorkshire	England
David Lloyd George	1916 to 1922	Chorlton-on-Medlock, Lancashire,	England
Bonar Law	1922 to 1923	Rexton, Kent County	New Brunswick colony, modern day Canada
Ramsay MacDonald	1924 1929 to 1935	Lossiemouth, Morayshire	Scotland
Stanley Baldwin	1924 to 1929 1935 to 1937	Bewdley, Worcestershire	England
Neville Chamberlain	1937 to 1940	Edgbaston, Birmingham	England
Winston Churchill	1940 to 1945 1951 to 1955	Blenheim Palace, Oxfordshire	England
Clement Attlee	1945 to 1951	Putney, Surrey	England
Sir Anthony Eden	1955 to 1957	Windlestone Hall, County Durham	England
Harold Macmillan	1957 to 1963	Belgravia, London	England
Sir Alec Douglas-Home	1963 to 1964	Mayfair, London	England
Harold Wilson	1964 to 1970 1974 to 1976	Huddersfield, West Riding of Yorkshire	England
Edward Heath	1970 to 1974	Broadstairs, Kent	England
James Callaghan	1976 to 1979	Portsmouth, Hampshire	England
Margaret Thatcher	1979 to 1990	Grantham, Lincolnshire	England
John Major	1990 to 1997	St Helier, Surrey	England
Tony Blair	1997 to 2007	Edinburgh, Midlothian	Scotland
Gordon Brown	2007 to 2010	Giffnock, Renfrewshire	Scotland
David Cameron	2010 to 2016	Marylebone, London	England
Theresa May	2016 to 2019	Eastbourne, East Sussex	England
Boris Johnson	2019 to 2022	New York City, New York	United States
Liz Truss	2022	Oxford, Oxfordshire	England
Rishi Sunak	2022 to 2024	Southampton, Hampshire	England
Keir Starmer	2024 to 2026	Southwark, London	England
Andy Burnham	2026-Present	Aintree, Liverpool	England

== See also ==
- List of prime ministers of Australia by birthplace
- List of prime ministers of Canada by birthdate, birthplace, and age
- List of prime ministers of New Zealand by place of birth
