= Fox Ministry =

The Fox Ministry may refer to any of multiple responsible governments in New Zealand when William Fox was in leadership:

- 1856 Fox Ministry
- 1861–1862 Fox Ministry
- 1863–1864 Whitaker–Fox Ministry
- 1869–1872 Fox Ministry
- 1873 Fox Ministry
