= Henry Peters =

Henry or Harry Peters may refer to:

- Henry Peters (British politician) (c. 1763–1827)
- Harry Peters (politician) (c. 1788–1870), Canadian politician
- Harry Peters (mountaineer) (1852–1941), German-born New Zealand mountaineer
- Henry Peters (Australian politician) (1881–1918), member of the New South Wales Legislative Assembly
- Henry M. Peters (1889–1987), American politician
- Hank Peters (Henry John Peters, 1924–2015), American baseball executive

== See also ==
- Henry Peter (born 1957), French-Swiss business lawyer
- Henry Peters House, a historic home built around 1910 in DeKalb County, Indiana
- Harry Peeters (1931–2012), Dutch historian and psychologist
- Harry Peeters (rower) (1920–?), Belgian rower
