= 1872–1873 Waterhouse ministry =

Former government of New Zealand

The Waterhouse Ministry was a responsible government which held power in New Zealand from October 1872 to March 1873, led by the Hon. George Waterhouse from the Legislative Council. It is notable as the first Ministry to include Māori as members of Cabinet.

== Background ==
George Waterhouse had previously been Premier of South Australia, and had represented the Fox-Vogel Ministry in the upper house of the New Zealand General Assembly for three weeks in 1871. Julius Vogel won a vote of no confidence against Premier Edward Stafford in October 1872 but the Governor did not call him to form a new government, instead asking William Fox, who in turn advised him to send for Waterhouse due to his status as an ex-Premier and current pastoralist. Waterhouse saw himself as a politically neutral arbiter figure and did not take either a portfolio or a salary, in practice leaving the leadership of the government to Vogel.

Wi Katene and Wiremu Parata were the first indigenous Ministers in New Zealand; Parata called for both races to work together, but his support for the Government caused him some difficulties in Māori circles. Native Minister Donald McLean consulted the Māori Members ahead of the introduction of his Native Lands Act 1873, but only Parata approved.

Although it was regarded as a provincialist ministry, the Waterhouse Government continued Vogel's policy of boosting Public Works and Immigration through debt-funded central government activity. Waterhouse was not aware of the details of Vogel's management of the colonial finances until he filled in as Treasurer while Vogel was overseas; what he learned at this time made him disillusioned as to the sustainability of the borrowing policy, and he decided to resign. John Hall, who was also intending to resign from Cabinet for health reasons, prevailed upon Waterhouse to remain in office to keep the Ministry going. The retiring Governor Bowen also objected to Waterhouse's resignation and refused to accept it – Waterhouse therefore banned him from using the Government's steamer to leave the colony until he did so. Vogel now took his turn as Premier, although Fox took the office until Vogel was able to return from Australia.

== Ministers ==
The following members served in the Waterhouse Ministry:

Name	Portrait	Office	Term
George Waterhouse, MLC		Premier	11 October 1872 – 3 March 1873
Julius Vogel		Colonial Treasurer	11 October 1872 – 6 July 1875
Julius Vogel		Postmaster-General	11 October 1872 – 1 September 1876
Donald McLean		Native MInister	11 October 1872 – 7 December 1876
John Hall, MLC		Colonial Secretary	11 October 1872 – 3 March 1873
John Davies Ormond		Minister for Public Works	11 October 1872 – 29 October 1872
John Bathgate		Commissioner of Customs	11 October 1872 – 26 October 1872
John Bathgate		Minister of Justice	29 October 1872 – 20 February 1874
John Bathgate		Commissioner of Stamps	29 October 1872 – 20 February 1874
Edward Richardson		Member of Executive Council	11 October 1872 – 3 March 1873
Edward Richardson		Minister for Public Works	29 October 1872 – 4 January 1877
George O'Rorke		Secretary for Crown Lands	24 October 1872 – 13 August 1874
George O'Rorke		Minister for Immigration	24 October 1872 – 11 October 1873
William Reynolds		Commissioner of Customs	26 October 1872 – 15 February 1876
Wi Katene		Member of Executive Council	4 November 1872 – 15 February 1876
Wiremu Parata		Member of Executive Council	4 December 1872 – 15 February 1876

== See also ==
- New Zealand Government
