= 1873–1875 Vogel ministry =

Former government of New Zealand

The First Vogel Ministry was a responsible government which held power in New Zealand from April 1873 to July 1875.

== Background ==
Julius Vogel took office in 1873, William Fox having served in an interim capacity after the resignation of George Waterhouse. The personnel of the Ministry was initially the same as the Fox Ministry, except with the addition of Daniel Pollen leading the Government in the upper house after defecting from the Opposition.

Mindful of the unsustainability of the logging industry, Vogel promoted a measure to create national forestry reserves, but was frustrated by provincial interests who saw this as an encroachment on the Provincial Councils’ powers over land management. This was the trigger for this former provincialist to announce the abolition of provincial government. The constitutional issue cut across the previous party lines (based on boosting or criticising the management of public works investment) and enabled supporters of Edward Stafford, such as Harry Atkinson, to join the Government. Atkinson was one of the new Government supporters whose caution began to restrain the speed of the public works programme. Another proponent of caution was existing Minister Edward Richardson. However, the abolitionist turn alienated some of Vogel's original supporters: William Reynolds would only support abolition if the land funds were to remain allocated to provincial expenditure, but George O’Rorke wouldn't accept this. He announced his resignation as Minister in the House without informing his Cabinet colleagues. However, O’Rorke had also delivered a “lack-lustre performance” in office. Another provincialist Minister, John Bathgate, threatened to defend Dunedin's custom-house with a company of volunteers – but was induced to join the judiciary instead.

Continuation with the public works and immigration scheme became increasingly difficult as funds had already been committed which had not yet been borrowed on a tightening credit market, so Vogel resigned in 1875 to go to England for another £4 million loan. Daniel Pollen stood in to replace him.

== Ministers ==
The following members served in the Vogel Ministry:

Name	Portrait	Office	Term
Sir Julius Vogel		Premier	8 April 1873 – 6 July 1875
Sir Julius Vogel		Colonial Treasurer	11 October 1872 – 6 July 1875
Sir Julius Vogel		Postmaster-General	11 October 1872 – 1 September 1876
Sir Julius Vogel		Telegraph Commissioner	8 April 1873 – 1 September 1876
Sir Julius Vogel		Minister for Immigration	11 October 1873 – 10 September 1874
Sir Donald McLean		Minister for Native Affairs	11 October 1872 – 7 December 1876
John Bathgate		Minister of Justice	29 October 1872 – 20 February 1874
John Bathgate		Commissioner of Stamps	29 October 1872 – 20 February 1874
George O'Rorke		Secretary for Crown Lands	24 October 1872 – 13 August 1874
George O'Rorke		Minister for Immigration	24 October 1872 – 11 October 1873
George O'Rorke		Minister of Justice	20 February 1874 – 13 August 1874
George O'Rorke		Commissioner of Stamps	4 March 1874 – 13 August 1874
William Reynolds		Commissioner of Customs	26 October 1872 – 15 February 1876
William Reynolds		Colonial Secretary	14 April 1873 – 4 July 1873
Edward Richardson		Minister for Public Works	29 October 1872 – 4 January 1877
Wi Katene		Member of Executive Council	4 November 1872 – 15 February 1876
Wiremu Parata		Member of Executive Council	4 December 1872 – 15 February 1876
Daniel Pollen, MLC		Member of Executive Council	12 May 1873 – 6 July 1875
Daniel Pollen, MLC		Colonial Secretary	4 July 1873 – 13 October 1877
Commodore James Graham Goodenough, RN		Member of Executive Council	17 October 1873 – 24 June 1874
Harry Atkinson		Secretary for Crown Lands	7 September 1874 – 1 September 1876
Harry Atkinson		Minister for Immigration	10 September 1874 – 1 September 1876
Charles Bowen		Minister of Justice	16 December 1874 – 13 October 1877
Charles Bowen		Commissioner of Stamp Duties	16 December 1874 – 13 October 1877

== See also ==
- New Zealand Government
