= Thomas Henry Fitzgerald =

New Zealand and Australian politician

The Honourable Thomas Fitzgerald
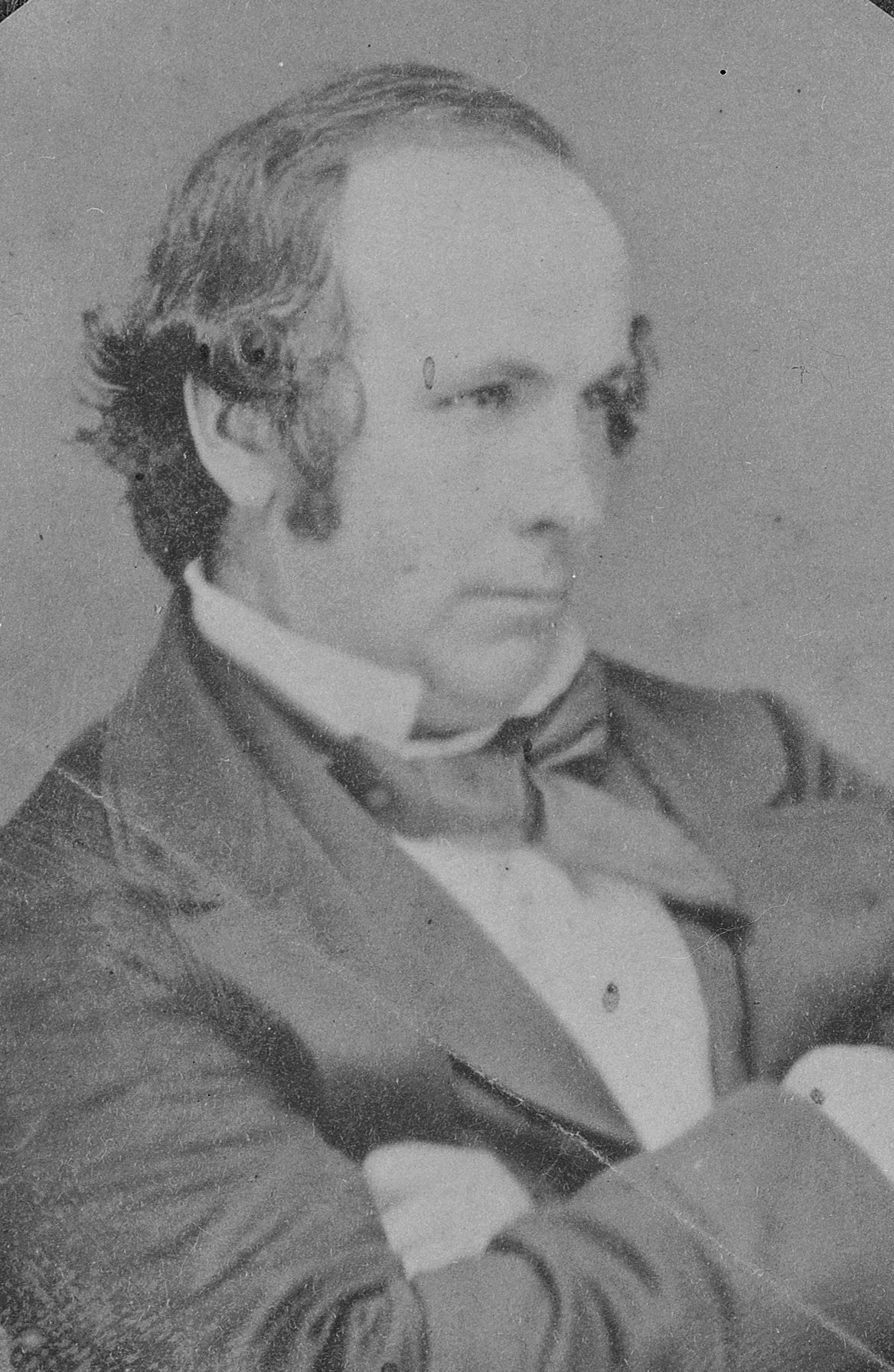

1st Superintendent of Hawke's Bay Province
- In office 23 April 1859 – March 1861
- Succeeded by: John Chilton Lambton Carter

Member of the New Zealand Parliament for County of Hawke
- In office 26 April 1860 – 5 November 1860

7th Treasurer of Queensland
- In office 25 November 1868 – 27 January 1869
- Preceded by: Robert Mackenzie
- Succeeded by: Thomas Blacket Stephens
- Constituency: Kennedy

Member of the Queensland Legislative Assembly for Rockhampton
- In office 27 June 1867 – 11 July 1867
- Preceded by: Charles Fitzsimmons
- Succeeded by: Archibald Archer

Member of the Queensland Legislative Assembly for Kennedy
- In office 19 July 1867 – 11 June 1869
- Preceded by: George Elphinstone Dalrymple
- Succeeded by: John Bright

Member of the Queensland Legislative Assembly for Bowen
- In office 4 November 1873 – 5 May 1875
- Preceded by: New seat
- Succeeded by: Francis Amhurst

Personal details
- Born: Thomas Henry Fitzgerald; 1 December 1824 Carrickmacross, Ireland, United Kingdom
- Died: 10 November 1888 (aged 63) Teneriffe, Queensland
- Resting place: Nudgee Cemetery
- Spouse: Jessie Wilson
- Relations: Charles Borromeo Fitzgerald (son); Paddy Fitzgerald (grandson)
- Occupation: Public servant, sugarcane farmer, surveyor

Thomas Henry Fitzgerald (1 December 1824 – 10 November 1888) was a British pioneer in sugar cane farming in the early days of the colony of Queensland, Australia. He was a politician, first in New Zealand, then in Queensland. His descendants went on to become notable names in Queensland politics, business and law. He is best remembered for founding the town of Innisfail.

During his life, Fitzgerald was a surveyor, sugar cane farmer, Superintendent, Colonial Treasurer and pioneer.

== Early life ==
Thomas Henry Fitzgerald was born in Carrickmacross, Ireland in December 1824. Fitzgerald qualified as an engineer, but like many of his compatriots of the time, he left Ireland to seek fortune elsewhere.

== New Zealand ==
New Zealand Parliament
Years	Term	Electorate	Party
1860	2nd	County of Hawke	Independent

Fitzgerald and one of his sisters went to New Zealand in 1842 on the George Fyfe, following their brother John, who was a medical doctor. There, he trained and worked as a surveyor and achieved additional qualifications as an engineer and architect. In 1844, he purchased 16 acres (6.5 ha) in Khandallah. Fitzgerald's earliest architectural tenders were for a gaol at Mount Cook, Wellington in 1843, a barracks at Paremata in 1846, and the Wellington Native Hospital in 1846. On 2 July 1851, he married Jessie Wilson at Wellington, the oldest daughter of James Wilson of that city.

Fitzgerald designed St Mary's Cathedral, Wellington and St Joseph's Providence, a Catholic charity school for Māori girls on the grounds of the new St Mary's College in the Wellington suburb of Thorndon. The building had two storeys, 18 bedrooms, and was opened in September 1852. The building was demolished in the 1970s, and only a porch from an 1869 extension remains, which is registered by Heritage New Zealand as a Category II heritage item.

In 1853, the Fitzgeralds moved to the Hawke's Bay, where he surveyed the area. He had two general stores, one of them in Napier's Waghorne Street, and he built a steam flour mill in that town. Other business activities were him acting as an agent for a shipping company, for an insurance company, and buying wool.

Fitzgerald took a very active part in Hawke's Bay politics. He represented the Ahuriri electorate (Ahuriri is the Māori name for Napier) on the Wellington Provincial Council from November 1857 to November 1858. His father-in-law, James Wilson, had previously represented the Wanganui and Rangitikei electorate from October 1856 to August 1857 on the Provincial Council. Fitzgerald was instrumental in the separation of Hawke's Bay Province from Wellington Province in November 1858, and he represented the Town of Napier electorate on the first Hawke's Bay Provincial Council from February 1859 to November 1861.

At its inaugural meeting on 23 April 1859, the Hawke's Bay provincial council unanimously elected Fitzgerald as the province's first Superintendent, a role he held until March 1861, when he resigned. Fitzgerald's selection surprised many observers, who had expected a close contest between John Chilton Lambton Carter and Alfred Newman. Carter and Newman, however, withdrew after soundings showed the ten-member council to be deadlocked five-all. Donald McLean, the first person approached to be a compromise candidate, declined the offer; Fitzgerald accepted. Although he initially accepted the superintendency in an honorary capacity, he was later voted an annual salary, but his term was marked by bitterness between his "town" faction from Napier and a "country" faction. Future premier Alfred Domett mockingly nicknamed him "Silky Tom".

He represented the County of Hawke electorate in the 2nd New Zealand Parliament in 1860, from 26 April to 5 November, when he apparently retired. This was the only period during which this electorate existed. In 1862, he was declared bankrupt, which led to his move to Queensland.

== Queensland ==
Fitzgerald in later life

In 1862, Fitzgerald moved to the colony of Queensland, Australia. He settled in Brisbane and, through his work, saw early experiments in growing sugar cane in Queensland's sub-tropical climate. In 1866, while surveying in Mackay, Queensland he established the Alexandra sugar cane plantation. Over time, he developed a further four plantations in the region. The Alexandra mill was notable as it introduced new efficiencies into sugar cane milling, making the farming of sugar cane more accessible to the small farmers who, until that point, had mainly farmed cotton and maize. Between 1865 and 1871 the land under sugar cultivation had increased from 20 acres (81,000 m^{2}) to 2,493 acres (10 km^{2}). By 1876, this had increased to 5,568 acres (23 km^{2}) and by 1884 it had reached 19,320 acres (78 km^{2}).

Like many pioneers, Fitzgerald juggled active interests in business, politics and professional life (as a surveyor, Fitzgerald laid out the original town survey for what would become the city of Mackay).

At the 1867 Queensland colonial election, Fitzgerald stood as a candidate in two seats: Rockhampton (election held on 27 June) and Kennedy (election held 19 July). Having won Rockhampton, he resigned Rockhampton on 30 June as he preferred to win in Kennedy. On 19 July, he won in Kennedy.

Fitzgerald was appointed Colonial Treasurer in November 1868 in the government of Charles Lilley, a post he held for three months until he resigned from that role. In June 1869, he resigned from the seat of Kennedy.

Between 1873 and 1875, Fitzgerald represented the seat of Bowen between 1873 and 1875. One of his agendas through his term was to legislate for the introduction of cheap South Sea Islander indentured labour for the cane fields (many of were blackbirded). Fitzgerald had a direct financial interest in this: times were difficult in the industry and cheap labour was seen as an answer to the many problems in founding sugar cane plantations. He and his fellow farmers in the region experienced further difficulties in the following years, mainly from torrential rains that brought about widespread cane rust. Fitzgerald was declared bankrupt in 1876 and had to resign his seat from Parliament, this time for good.

Fitzgerald returned to Brisbane and to surveying, although his dreams of establishing settlements in far north Queensland had not died. With some backing from the Catholic Church (Fitzgerald was a devout Catholic), he established, in 1880, a sugarcane plantation known as Innisfail Estate (now a locality of the same name) and accompanying settlement, which later became the town of Innisfail in far north Queensland. However, despite the eventual success of the town, the early years were very trying for Fitzgerald. Weather conditions (flooding in particular) made farming difficult, sugar prices were not good (competition against bigger milling operations did not make this easier) and ultimately managing the diseases that came with new settlements in sub-tropical regions proved too much for Fitzgerald.

== Later life ==
Fitzgerald retired to Teneriffe in Brisbane in poor health and died there on 10 November 1888 at the age of 64. Fitzgerald was buried in Nudgee Cemetery.

== Legacy ==
While having varying financial success in his life (more down than up), Fitzgerald could be perceived as notable for his desire to establish something greater than personal fortune despite all the failures and disappointments. For many Irish people deciding upon Australia as their new home in the world the result was often similar. Fitzgerald anticipated rich and fertile far north Queensland that could house many people and feed even more. The areas he surveyed, from the Daintree down to Tully, are now popular tourist destinations and productive farm lands.

He took the first difficult steps in establishing this region's modern agricultural industry. The rush that ensued, particularly encouraged by the successful methods of Fitzgerald's Alexandra mill, established an entire industry and contributed to the growth of a strong economy in North Queensland.

Innisfail was originally the name for Fitzgerald's own property. The Surveyor-General called the town Geraldton, in Fitzgerald's honour, in 1882. However, a Russian ship bound for Geraldton in Western Australia arrived at the port to collect a load of jarrah wood. This would be the equivalent of a ship sailing up the Potomac River to Washington, D.C. to collect trees from the forests of Washington state. A public meeting was held in 1910 and the name of the town was officially changed to Innisfail. A school in North Mackay is also named in his honour.

Other successes that Fitzgerald did not live to see were those of his children and their descendants. In his immediate family of 11, most notable was Charles Borromeo Fitzgerald, who held the seat of Mitchell from 1896 to 1902 and was appointed Attorney-General in the short-lived Labour ministry of Anderson Dawson—the first labour government in the world. Ironically, the Australian Labor Party was one of the primary drivers of the White Australia policy, looking to stop the influx of foreign labour into the Australian economy (in particular the sugar cane farms of North Queensland). In subsequent generations, the scions of the Thomas Henry Fitzgerald family would establish themselves in business, law (the succeeding generations of lawyers named James Francis Fitzgerald), education, the clergy and the military.

Additional legacies of Fitzgerald exist. The place name of Te Kowai in Queensland was named by Fitzgerald after the flower of the same name he first saw in New Zealand as a younger man.

== Notes ==
Political offices
New office	Superintendent of Hawke's Bay Province; 1859–1861	Succeeded by John Chilton Lambton Carter
Parliament of Queensland
Preceded by Charles Fitzsimmons	Member for Rockhampton; 1867	Succeeded by Archibald Archer
Preceded by George Elphinstone Dalrymple	Member for Kennedy; 1867–1869	Succeeded by John Bright
New seat	Member for Bowen; 1873–1875	Succeeded by Francis Amhurst
