= 1865–1869 Stafford ministry =

Former government of New Zealand

The Second Stafford Ministry was the eighth responsible government to be formed in New Zealand, and one of the longer-lasting ministries during this period. It formed in October 1865 and lasted until June 1869. However, it was defeated in a vote of confidence on 15 August 1866 and resigned, to be reconstituted with three ministers replaced, so some contemporaries regarded it as two separate Ministries. As the office of Premier had yet to be formally established, Edward Stafford did not carry this title officially.

== Background ==
The previous Weld ministry collapsed due to a confidence motion brought by Julius Vogel, but Frederick Weld advised Governor Grey to call Edward Stafford instead. Grey promised Stafford to grant him a fresh general election even if the House did not express its confidence in him by granting Supply, raising the ire of the Weldites. The new government had three main policies: peace with Māori, retrenchment of the public accounts, and enhancing the power of central government.

Against the Ministry's proposal to reduce the funding of Provincial governments from customs receipts, the provincialist William Sefton Moorhouse moved a confidence motion which succeeded by 47 votes to 14 in August 1866, but Stafford was re-appointed and formed a coalition with the former Weldites. One of these was John Richardson, who was threatened with rotten eggs next time he visited his ultra-provincialist home of Dunedin. Upon the election of James Macandrew as Superintendent of Otago, Stafford caused a furore by withdrawing his power to manage the goldfields until his previous conduct had been audited.

With regard to finances, the Ministry pledged to make £240,000 in budget savings, and succeeded in returning to a surplus in 1866. They also successfully put a counter-claim to Britain's charges for the expense of providing Imperial regiments during the New Zealand Wars, and their focus on expenditure was described by Postmaster-General John Hall as "retrenchment frenzy". In 1867 the provinces' existing loans were taken over by the central government and the local governments were forbidden from taking out any further loans.

The Māori policy of the Government was of non-intervention unless provoked: Stafford followed a conciliatory line by pardoning some of the killers of Carl Volkner, and attempted to involve Māori in colonial politics by creating four electoral districts in the House of Representatives for them. Later, the outbreak of two new insurgencies led by Tītokowaru and Te Kooti raised a military response. Government Agent and opposition politician Donald McLean was sacked in March 1869 for advising Major Ropata not to obey orders to reinforce the Taranaki campaign, and Opposition leader Sir William Fox moved a no-confidence vote over the dismissal, which he won 40–29 on 24 June.

== Ministers ==
The following members served in the Weld Ministry:

Name	Image	Office	Term
Edward Stafford		Member of Executive Council	16 October 1865 – 28 June 1869
Edward Stafford		Colonial Secretary	31 October 1865 – 28 June 1869
Edward Stafford		Colonial Treasurer	31 October 1865 – 12 June 1866
Edward Stafford		Postmaster-General	31 October 1865 – 8 May 1866
Edward Stafford		Postmaster-General	6 February 1869 – 28 June 1869
Theodore Haultain		Member of Executive Council	16 October 1865 – 28 June 1869
Theodore Haultain		Minister for Colonial Defence	31 October 1865 – 28 June 1869
Andrew Russell, MLC		Member of Executive Council	16 October 1865 – 24 August 1866
Andrew Russell, MLC		Minister for Native Affairs	31 October 1865 – 24 August 1866
James Paterson		Member of Executive Council	16 October 1865 – 24 August 1866
James Paterson		Postmaster-General	8 May 1865 – 24 August 1866
John Johnston, MLC		Member of Executive Council	14 May 1866 – 5 April 1867
Francis Jollie		Member of Executive Council	14 May 1866 – 24 August 1866
Francis Jollie		Colonial Treasurer	12 June 1866 – 24 August 1866
William Fitzherbert		Colonial Treasurer	24 August 1866 – 28 June 1869
William Fitzherbert		Commissioner of Stamp Duties	6 May 1867 – 28 June 1869
John Hall		Member of Executive Council	24 August 1866 – 28 June 1869
John Hall		Postmaster-General	24 August 1866 – 5 February 1869
John Hall		Electric Telegraph Commissioner	16 October 1866 – 5 February 1869
James Crowe Richmond		Commissioner of Customs	24 August 1866 – 28 June 1869
James Crowe Richmond		Commissioner of Stamp Duties	6 May 1867 – 28 June 1869
John Richardson		Member of Executive Council	24 August 1866 – 23 June 1868
John Hyde Harris, MLC		Member of Executive Council	9 September 1867 – 13 May 1868
John Hyde Harris, MLC		Solicitor-General	26 October 1867 – 13 May 1868
Daniel Pollen, MLC		Member of Executive Council	10 June 1869 – 28 June 1869

== See also ==
- New Zealand Government
