= John Chilton Lambton Carter =

New Zealand politician

John Chilton Lambton Carter (31 January 1816 – 27 May 1872) was a 19th-century New Zealand politician.

== Early life ==
He was born in Conwal, County Donegal, Ireland where his English father was stationed with the 44th Regiment.

== Military career ==
He followed in his father's footsteps and became a soldier. He became an ensign in the 44th Regiment on 28 Mar 1834. In 1836, he was accused of raping a nine-year-old girl at his barracks at Fort William. He did not deny that he had sex with the child, but said that it was consensual because she was a prostitute. The case was dismissed for lack of evidence. Later, he was in the 53rd Regiment, where he obtained the rank of Captain. He resigned and came to New Zealand, settling in the Hawke's Bay. He worked as a sheep farmer.

== Political career ==
He was elected as the second Superintendent of Hawke's Bay Province. He served from 8 Apr 1861 to 5 Dec 1862.

== Family and death ==
Carter was married twice. His first marriage on 27 Aug 1844 was with Susan Frances Lillicrap in Plymouth, Devon, England; four boys and four girls. The first three children from the first marriage were all born in Firozpur, India, between 1847 and 1849. The next two were born in England, in 1850 and 1851. His remaining children were born in Napier, New Zealand. Susan Lillicrap died on 31 Dec 1862. His second marriage was with Maria Theresa McKain, on 19 Aug 1864, Napier; they had three daughters.

Carter died on 27 May 1872 in Napier.

Political offices
Preceded by Thomas Henry FitzGerald	Superintendent of Hawke's Bay Province; 1861–1862	Succeeded by Donald McLean
