= List of prime ministers of Australia by birthplace =

These lists give the states of Australian prime ministers by the locations of the divisions which they represented, and by their birthplaces.

== States of represented division ==
=== By order of first term ===
| # | Name | State | Division | Party |
|---|---|---|---|---|
| 1 | Edmund Barton | New South Wales | Hunter | Protectionist |
| 2 | Alfred Deakin | Victoria | Ballarat | Protectionist |
| 3 | Chris Watson | New South Wales | Bland | Labor |
| 4 | George Reid | New South Wales | East Sydney | Free Trade |
| 5 | Andrew Fisher | Queensland | Wide Bay | Labor |
| 6 | Joseph Cook | New South Wales | Parramatta | Commonwealth Liberal |
| 7 | Billy Hughes | New South Wales | West Sydney | Labor / National Labor / Nationalist |
| 7 | Billy Hughes | Victoria | Bendigo | Nationalist |
| 7 | Billy Hughes | New South Wales | North Sydney | Nationalist |
| 8 | Stanley Bruce | Victoria | Flinders | Nationalist |
| 9 | James Scullin | Victoria | Yarra | Labor |
| 10 | Joseph Lyons | Tasmania | Wilmot | United Australia |
| 11 | Earle Page | New South Wales | Cowper | Country |
| 12 | Robert Menzies | Victoria | Kooyong | United Australia/Liberal |
| 13 | Arthur Fadden | Queensland | Darling Downs | Country |
| 14 | John Curtin | Western Australia | Fremantle | Labor |
| 15 | Frank Forde | Queensland | Capricornia | Labor |
| 16 | Ben Chifley | New South Wales | Macquarie | Labor |
| 17 | Harold Holt | Victoria | Higgins | Liberal |
| 18 | John McEwen | Victoria | Murray | Country |
| 19 | John Gorton | Victoria | Higgins | Liberal |
| 20 | William McMahon | New South Wales | Lowe | Liberal |
| 21 | Gough Whitlam | New South Wales | Werriwa | Labor |
| 22 | Malcolm Fraser | Victoria | Wannon | Liberal |
| 23 | Bob Hawke | Victoria | Wills | Labor |
| 24 | Paul Keating | New South Wales | Blaxland | Labor |
| 25 | John Howard | New South Wales | Bennelong | Liberal |
| 26 | Kevin Rudd | Queensland | Griffith | Labor |
| 27 | Julia Gillard | Victoria | Lalor | Labor |
| 28 | Tony Abbott | New South Wales | Warringah | Liberal |
| 29 | Malcolm Turnbull | New South Wales | Wentworth | Liberal |
| 30 | Scott Morrison | New South Wales | Cook | Liberal |
| 31 | Anthony Albanese | New South Wales | Grayndler | Labor |

=== By state ===
| State | Prime minister | # |
|---|---|---|
| New South Wales | Edmund Barton | 1 |
| New South Wales | Chris Watson | 3 |
| New South Wales | George Reid | 4 |
| New South Wales | Joseph Cook | 6 |
| New South Wales | Billy Hughes | 7 |
| New South Wales | Earle Page | 11 |
| New South Wales | Ben Chifley | 16 |
| New South Wales | William McMahon | 20 |
| New South Wales | Gough Whitlam | 21 |
| New South Wales | Paul Keating | 24 |
| New South Wales | John Howard | 25 |
| New South Wales | Tony Abbott | 28 |
| New South Wales | Malcolm Turnbull | 29 |
| New South Wales | Scott Morrison | 30 |
| New South Wales | Anthony Albanese | 31 |
| Queensland | Andrew Fisher | 5 |
| Queensland | Arthur Fadden | 13 |
| Queensland | Frank Forde | 15 |
| Queensland | Kevin Rudd | 26 |
| Tasmania | Joseph Lyons | 10 |
| Victoria | Alfred Deakin | 2 |
| Victoria | Billy Hughes | 7 |
| Victoria | Stanley Bruce | 8 |
| Victoria | James Scullin | 9 |
| Victoria | Robert Menzies | 12 |
| Victoria | Harold Holt | 17 |
| Victoria | John McEwen | 18 |
| Victoria | John Gorton | 19 |
| Victoria | Malcolm Fraser | 22 |
| Victoria | Bob Hawke | 23 |
| Victoria | Julia Gillard | 27 |
| Western Australia | John Curtin | 14 |

=== Per state ===
| Number | State |
|---|---|
| 15 | New South Wales |
| 12 | Victoria |
| 4 | Queensland |
| 1 | Tasmania |
| 1 | Western Australia |
| 0 | ACT |
| 0 | Northern Territory |
| 0 | South Australia |

== Birth places ==
As of June 2026, five of the six states claim the distinction of being the birthplace of a prime minister. Twelve prime ministers, those born prior to the federation of Australia, were born in British colonies within Australia, rather than independent Australian states. The birthplaces of seven prime ministers are decisively within sovereign states that are separate from Australia, including six in Great Britain, and one in Chile.

The number of prime ministers born per state are:

- One: South Australia and Tasmania.
- Three: Queensland.
- Nine: Victoria.
- Ten: New South Wales

States and territories that have not born a prime minister: Australian Capital Territory, Northern Territory, Western Australia.

=== By state ===
| Region | | Prime minister |
|---|---|---|
| New South Wales | 10 | Edmund Barton |
| New South Wales | 10 | Earle Page |
| New South Wales | 10 | Ben Chifley |
| New South Wales | 10 | Harold Holt |
| New South Wales | 10 | William McMahon |
| New South Wales | 10 | Paul Keating |
| New South Wales | 10 | John Howard |
| New South Wales | 10 | Malcolm Turnbull |
| New South Wales | 10 | Scott Morrison |
| New South Wales | 10 | Anthony Albanese |
| Victoria | 8 | Alfred Deakin |
| Victoria | 8 | Stanley Bruce |
| Victoria | 8 | James Scullin |
| Victoria | 8 | Robert Menzies |
| Victoria | 8 | John Curtin |
| Victoria | 8 | John McEwen |
| Victoria | 8 | Gough Whitlam |
| Victoria | 8 | Malcolm Fraser |
| England | 3 | Joseph Cook |
| England | 3 | Billy Hughes |
| England | 3 | Tony Abbott |
| Queensland | 3 | Arthur Fadden |
| Queensland | 3 | Frank Forde |
| Queensland | 3 | Kevin Rudd |
| Scotland | 2 | George Reid |
| Scotland | 2 | Andrew Fisher |
| Chile | 1 | Chris Watson |
| South Australia | 1 | Bob Hawke |
| Tasmania | 1 | Joseph Lyons |
| Wales | 1 | Julia Gillard |
| Disputed | 1 | John Gorton (Note: Gorton was told by his father that he was born in Wellington, New Zealand. While his birth certificate stated he was born in Prahran, Victoria, the certificate contained numerous mistakes.) |

=== Prime ministers with division outside of birth state ===
Of the 24 Australian-born individuals who have been prime ministers of Australia, four became so after representing divisions in different states than the ones in which they were born.

| Prime minister | Birth state | Division state |
|---|---|---|
| John Curtin | Victoria | Western Australia |
| Harold Holt | New South Wales | Victoria |
| Gough Whitlam | Victoria | New South Wales |
| Bob Hawke | South Australia | Victoria |

=== Maps ===
==== Countries ====
Birthplaces of Australian-born prime ministers
Birthplaces of British-born Australian prime ministers
Birthplaces of Australian prime ministers born elsewhere

==== Cities ====
Birthplaces of Sydney-born prime ministers
Birthplaces of Melbourne-born prime ministers

== See also ==
- Prime Minister of Australia
- List of prime ministers of Australia by time in office
- List of prime ministers of Australia by military service
- List of prime ministers of New Zealand by place of birth
- List of prime ministers of Canada by birthdate, birthplace, and age
