= Hawke's Bay Province =

Hawke's Bay Heretaunga
- Provinces of New Zealand
- Hawke's Bay Province within New Zealand
- Coordinates: 39°29′S 176°55′E
- Country: New Zealand
- Island: North Island
- Established: 1858
- Abolished: 1876
- Named for: Edward Hawke, 1st Baron Hawke
- Seat: Napier

The Hawke's Bay Province was a province of New Zealand. The province separated from the Wellington Province following a meeting in Napier in February 1858, and existed until the abolition of provincial government in 1876. At the time of its establishment in 1858, the European population of the provincial district was only 1,185.

== History ==
One of the earliest European settlers in the area was William Colenso, and had his mission station at Port Ahuriri, the port of Napier. At a meeting in Napier in February 1858, the decision was made to split Hawke's Bay from the Wellington Province, which took effect in November of that year.

The province had its own elected Superintendent and provincial council. The provincial council sat at Napier.

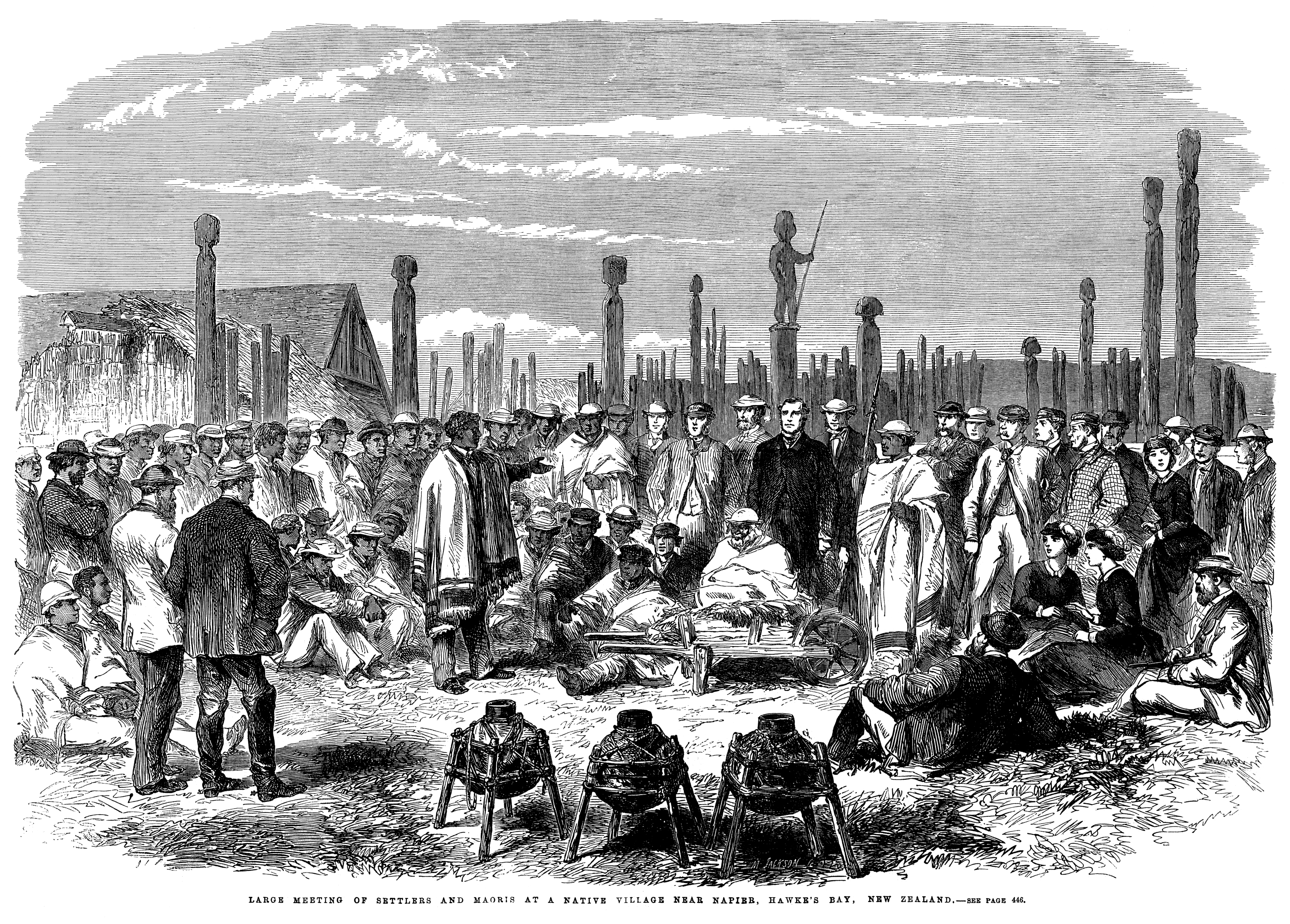
An 1863 meeting between settlers and Māori at Pā Whakairo, near Waiohiki

In 1863, the province was described in The Illustrated London News as "one of the principal grazing districts in the colony; it possesses abundance of fine agricultural land, and has a climate proverbially mild and healthy." The article goes on to estimate the population at 3,600 Maori and 2,600 settlers.

The system of provincial government was abolished in 1876.

== Area ==
The Crown initially bought two blocks of land: 279,000 acres (113,000 ha) at Waipukurau, and 265,000 acres (107,000 ha) at Ahuriri. By 1856, 30 sheep stations existed in Hawke's Bay, located mainly on those two blocks of land. Donald McLean organised further land purchases.

The capital of the province was Napier.

== Anniversary day ==
New Zealand law provides an anniversary day for each province. Hawke's Bay Province was founded on 1 November 1858.

== Superintendents ==
The Hawke's Bay Province had four Superintendents:

No.	from	to	Superintendent
1	23 April 1859	Mar 1861	Thomas Henry Fitzgerald
2	8 April 1861	5 December 1862	John Chilton Lambton Carter
3	26 February 1863	23 September 1869	Donald McLean
4	24 September 1869	1 January 1877	John Davies Ormond

== Legislation ==
There is no surviving legislation from the Hawke's Bay Provincial Council.
