= Ngataua Omahuru =

Māori lawyer

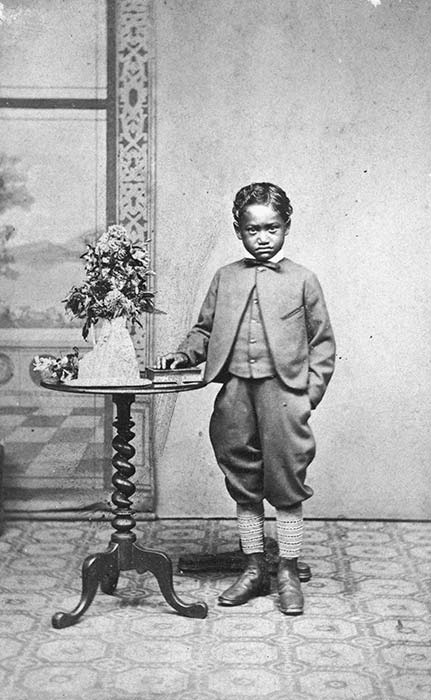
- Born: c. 1863; New Zealand
- Died: 1918
- Occupation: Lawyer
- Known for: New Zealand's first Maori lawyer; Being kidnapped as a child

Ngataua Omahuru (c. 1863 – 1918), also known as William Fox, was a Māori lawyer. He and his family lived in Mawhitiwhiti near Mount Taranaki in New Zealand's North Island.

== Background ==
In 1869, when Omahuru was five years old, he was kidnapped during the battle of Te Ngutu o te Manu by Maori loyalists and taken to Whanganui. He was later adopted by William Fox, who later became the Premier of New Zealand. Fox changed Omahuru's name to William Fox Jr. and sent him to school in Wellington. He later sent him to live and work with the lawyer, Walter Buller. Omahuru became New Zealand's first Maori lawyer and eventually worked with his adoptive father, William Fox, on the Taranaki Land Commission.

== See also ==
- List of kidnappings
