= List of prime ministers of New Zealand by place of birth =

This is a list of prime ministers of New Zealand by place of birth. Of New Zealand's forty-two prime ministers, twenty were born in New Zealand, nineteen in the United Kingdom (including one in what is now the Republic of Ireland, but was then part of the United Kingdom of Great Britain and Ireland), two in Australia, and one in Portugal. Of those born in New Zealand, eleven were born in the North Island, and nine in the South Island. All prime ministers in office since 1960 have been born in New Zealand.

== Australia (2) ==
- Joseph Ward – Melbourne, Victoria
- Michael Joseph Savage – Tatong, Victoria

== New Zealand (20) ==
=== North Island (11) ===
- John Key – Auckland
- David Lange – Auckland
- Robert Muldoon – Auckland
- Jacinda Ardern – Hamilton, Waikato
- Helen Clark – Hamilton, Waikato
- Chris Hipkins – Hutt Valley, Wellington
- Gordon Coates – Kaipara Harbour
- Jim Bolger – Ōpunake, Taranaki
- Keith Holyoake – Mangamutu, Manawatū
- Jack Marshall – Wellington
- Mike Moore – Whakatāne, Bay of Plenty

=== South Island (9) ===
- Christopher Luxon – Christchurch, Canterbury
- Jenny Shipley – Gore, Southland
- Sidney Holland – Greendale, Canterbury
- Bill English – Lumsden, Southland
- George Forbes – Lyttelton, Canterbury
- Bill Rowling – Motueka, Tasman Region
- Francis Bell – Nelson
- Geoffrey Palmer – Nelson
- Norman Kirk – Waimate, Canterbury

== Portugal (1) ==
- George Grey – Lisbon

== United Kingdom (19) ==
=== England (12) ===
- Frederick Whitaker – Bampton, Oxfordshire
- Frederick Weld – Bridport, Dorset
- Harry Atkinson – Broxton, Cheshire
- Alfred Domett – Camberwell, Surrey
- Richard Seddon – Eccleston, Lancashire
- William Hall-Jones – Folkestone, Kent
- Walter Nash – Kidderminster, Worcestershire
- John Hall – Kingston upon Hull, Yorkshire
- Julius Vogel – London
- Henry Sewell – Newport, Isle of Wight
- George Waterhouse – Penzance, Cornwall
- William Fox – South Shields, County Durham

=== Ireland (3) ===
- Daniel Pollen – Dublin, Leinster (now the Republic of Ireland)
- John Ballance – Glenavy, Ulster
- William Massey – Limavady, Ulster

=== Scotland (4) ===
- Thomas Mackenzie – Edinburgh
- Edward Stafford – Edinburgh
- Robert Stout – Lerwick, Shetland Islands
- Peter Fraser – Hill of Fearn, Ross and Cromarty

== See also ==
- Immigration to New Zealand
- List of prime ministers of New Zealand
- List of prime ministers of Australia by birthplace
