= 1869–1872 Fox ministry =

Former government of New Zealand

The Third Fox Ministry was a responsible government which held power in New Zealand from June 1869 to September 1872. Although William Fox was the head of the government, he was never appointed Premier as that office had yet to be established, although he did resign the office at the end of his tenure. The Ministry was also known as the Fox-Vogel Ministry as most of the agenda was set by the Treasurer, while Fox busied himself with administrative affairs and moral crusades such as the attempted introduction of local option polls for liquor licensing.

== Background ==
The provincialist faction behind William Fox defeated the Stafford Ministry in 1869 with a 40–29 no-confidence motion over the sacking of Donald McLean as Government Agent in the Native Department. McLean, also a Member of the House of Representatives, was appointed Native Minister in the new Ministry and focused largely on his own portfolio: his aim was to ‘glide into a state of peace’ by ending confiscation of Maori land. Other than Maori policy, the rest of the Government's ideas were unclear at first. They attempted to cut central government spending while removing restrictions on provincial borrowing. Isaac Featherston grew detached from the Ministry due to its “inflexible” provincialism and was sent to London with Dillon Bell to request that the Imperial Government retain two Army regiments in New Zealand and guarantee a £1 million loan – they were successful only in the second objective.

By the time they returned to New Zealand, however, Treasurer Julius Vogel had presented his 1870 Budget, which envisaged £10 million in expenditure on Public Works and Immigration, £6 million of this to be funded by fresh borrowing. Vogel's idea was to boost the colonisation process and end the economic stagnation engendered by the wars of the 1860s. The Great Public Works policy attracted widespread support, especially from Members whose electorates stood to gain a bridge or railway line. However, critics condemned Vogel's preparedness to encourage local greed and the lack of parliamentary oversight about how the funds were spent. On a trip to Britain, Vogel arranged a construction contract with the Brogdens firm which he had no authority to make, and it was heavily amended by the Opposition when he returned. The policy made no detailed provisions for settling immigrants, as this was still a responsibility of the Provinces.

The Fox-Vogel Ministry started off with relatively few Ministers, and Vogel spent much of its duration abroad, so it gained a reputation as a fairly weak team: William Gisborne was criticised for holding a civil service job (unpaid) while he was a Government Minister, and despite regarding himself as an administrator he often had to lead the House in the absence of other Ministers. Henry Sewell joined the Ministry from Opposition in 1870 to lead it in the Legislative Council and to make it more ‘cautious’ in policy, but ended up being asked to resign for refusing to bring Vogel's bills into the upper house. He was replaced by George Waterhouse, who filled in for three weeks and then resigned to pursue his own business interests. Finally John Hall, another former oppositionist, filled the role of presenting government measures in the council.

This Ministry presented a high number of bills which were withdrawn or defeated, and finally in 1872 it was defeated in a confidence motion by Edward Stafford – however, Stafford's attempted takeover was not successful and most of Fox's ministers returned in the Waterhouse Ministry. This was the beginning of the idea of a Continuous Ministry.

== Ministers ==
The following members served in the Fox Ministry:

Name	Portrait	Office	Term
William Fox		Premier	28 June 1869 – 10 September 1872
William Fox		Colonial Secretary	28 June 1869 – 5 July 1869
Julius Vogel		Colonial Treasurer	28 June 1869 – 10 September 1872
Julius Vogel		Commissioner of Customs	28 June 1869 – 8 January 1871
Julius Vogel		Commissioner of Customs	30 October 1871 – 10 September 1872
Julius Vogel		Postmaster-General	28 June 1869 – 10 September 1872
Julius Vogel		Commissioner of Stamp Duties	29 June 1869 – 10 September 1872
Julius Vogel		Electric Telegraph Commissioner	1 July 1869 – 10 September 1872
Donald McLean		Native Minister	29 June 1869 – 10 September 1872
Donald McLean		Minister for Colonial Defence	29 June 1869 – 10 September 1872
Dillon Bell		Member of Executive Council	2 July 1869 – 14 August 1871
William Gisborne, MLC		Member of Executive Council	2 July 1869 – 10 September 1872
William Gisborne, MLC		Colonial Secretary	5 July 1869 – 10 September 1872
William Gisborne, MLC		Minister of Public Works	27 September 1870 – 6 December 1871
Isaac Featherston		Member of Executive Council	16 November 1869 – 31 March 1871
Henry Sewell, MLC		Minister of Justice	13 June 1870 – 30 October 1871
Henry Sewell, MLC		Commissioner of Stamp Duties	2 January 1871 – 27 October 1871
Henry Sewell, MLC		Commissioner of Customs	8 January 1871 – 30 October 1871
George Waterhouse, MLC		Member of Executive Council	30 October 1871 – 20 November 1871
William Reeves		Member of Executive Council	27 November 1871 – 10 September 1872
William Reeves		Resident Minister for Middle Island	6 December 1871 – 10 September 1872
John Davies Ormond		Minister of Public Works	6 December 1871 – 10 September 1872
John Hall, MLC		Member of Executive Council	20 July 1872 – 10 September 1872
Henry Miller, MLC		Member of Executive Council	29 July 1872 – 10 September 1872

== See also ==
- New Zealand Government
