= 1876 Vogel ministry =

Former government of New Zealand

The Second Vogel Ministry was a responsible government which held power in New Zealand from February to September 1876.

== Background ==
The Continuous Ministry had abolished the Provinces and carried out an extensive public works scheme by the time Sir Julius Vogel returned to New Zealand from a mission seeking a further loan from London. He now reassumed the Premiership, but previous supporters of Vogel’s policies, such as John Davies Ormond, now refused to serve in Government and pressured the Ministry to retrench public spending. Additionally, the abolition of the Provinces meant that the central government now had to pay for public education, leading to reduced spending, cuts in the public works and immigration budget, and another £2 million overseas loan.

The liberal opposition, led by Sir George Grey, blocked the final sale of the Piako Swamp to a syndicate led by Thomas Russell, arguing that a direct sale of confiscated Māori land was illegal and that the Government was giving favourable treatment to a wealthy banker and political ally. The Government was saved on this issue by the Speaker’s casting vote.

When the House met, Vogel resigned, citing personal attacks from the Opposition over his perceived extravagance with the finances at a time of low export prices. He also had a “morbid fear” of dying poor, so he arranged to hand over the Premiership to someone who would appoint him to the salaried position of Agent-General – in September, he landed on Harry Atkinson.

== Ministers ==
The following members served in the Vogel Ministry:

| Name | Portrait | Office | Term |
|---|---|---|---|
| Sir Julius Vogel | | Premier | 15 February 1876 – 1 September 1876 |
| Sir Julius Vogel | | Colonial Treasurer | 15 February 1876 – 1 September 1876 |
| Sir Julius Vogel | | Postmaster-General | 11 October 1872 – 1 September 1876 |
| Sir Julius Vogel | | Commissioner of Telegraphs | 8 April 1873 – 1 September 1876 |
| Sir Donald McLean | | Minister for Native Affairs | 11 October 1872 – 7 December 1876 |
| Daniel Pollen, MLC | | Colonial Secretary | 4 July 1873 – 13 October 1877 |
| Edward Richardson | | Minister for Public Works | 29 October 1872 – 4 January 1877 |
| Harry Atkinson | | Secretary for Crown Lands | 7 September 1874 – 1 September 1876 |
| Harry Atkinson | | Minister for Immigration | 10 September 1874 – 1 September 1876 |
| Harry Atkinson | | Commissioner of Customs | 15 February 1876 – 3 July 1876 |
| Charles Bowen | | Minister of Justice | 16 December 1874 – 13 October 1877 |
| Charles Bowen | | Commissioner of Stamp Duties | 16 December 1874 – 13 October 1877 |
| William Swanson | | Member of Executive Council | 11 March 1876 – 1 September 1876 |
| George McLean | | Commissioner of Customs | 4 July 1876 – 13 October 1877 |

== See also ==
- New Zealand Government
