= 1873 Fox ministry =

Former government of New Zealand

The fourth Fox ministry was a responsible government which held power in New Zealand from March to April 1873.

== Background ==
After the resignation of George Waterhouse as premier, Governor Bowen asked three-time ex-premier William Fox to take office as an interim measure. Fox was to hold office only until Julius Vogel returned from a postal conference in Australia. He was described as "fairy godmother and peacemaker" to the Continuous Ministry. Vogel returned to New Zealand at the start of April and asked Fox to stay on to the beginning of the next session of Parliament, but he refused and passed the office on to Vogel.

== Ministers ==
The following members served in the Fox ministry:

Name	Portrait	Office	Term
William Fox		Premier	3 March 1873 – 8 April 1873
William Fox		Colonial Secretary	3 March 1873 – 8 April 1873
Julius Vogel		Colonial Treasurer	11 October 1872 – 6 July 1875
Julius Vogel		Postmaster-General	11 October 1872 – 1 September 1876
Donald McLean		Minister for Native Affairs	11 October 1872 – 7 December 1876
John Bathgate		Minister of Justice	29 October 1872 – 20 February 1874
John Bathgate		Commissioner of Stamps	29 October 1872 – 20 February 1874
George O'Rorke		Secretary for Crown Lands	24 October 1872 – 13 August 1874
George O'Rorke		Minister for Immigration	24 October 1872 – 11 October 1873
William Reynolds		Commissioner of Customs	26 October 1872 – 15 February 1876
Edward Richardson		Minister for Public Works	29 October 1872 – 4 January 1877
Wi Katene		Member of Executive Council	4 November 1872 – 15 February 1876
Wiremu Parata		Member of Executive Council	4 December 1872 – 15 February 1876

== See also ==
- New Zealand Government
