= Henry Peter =

Lawyer and Law professor

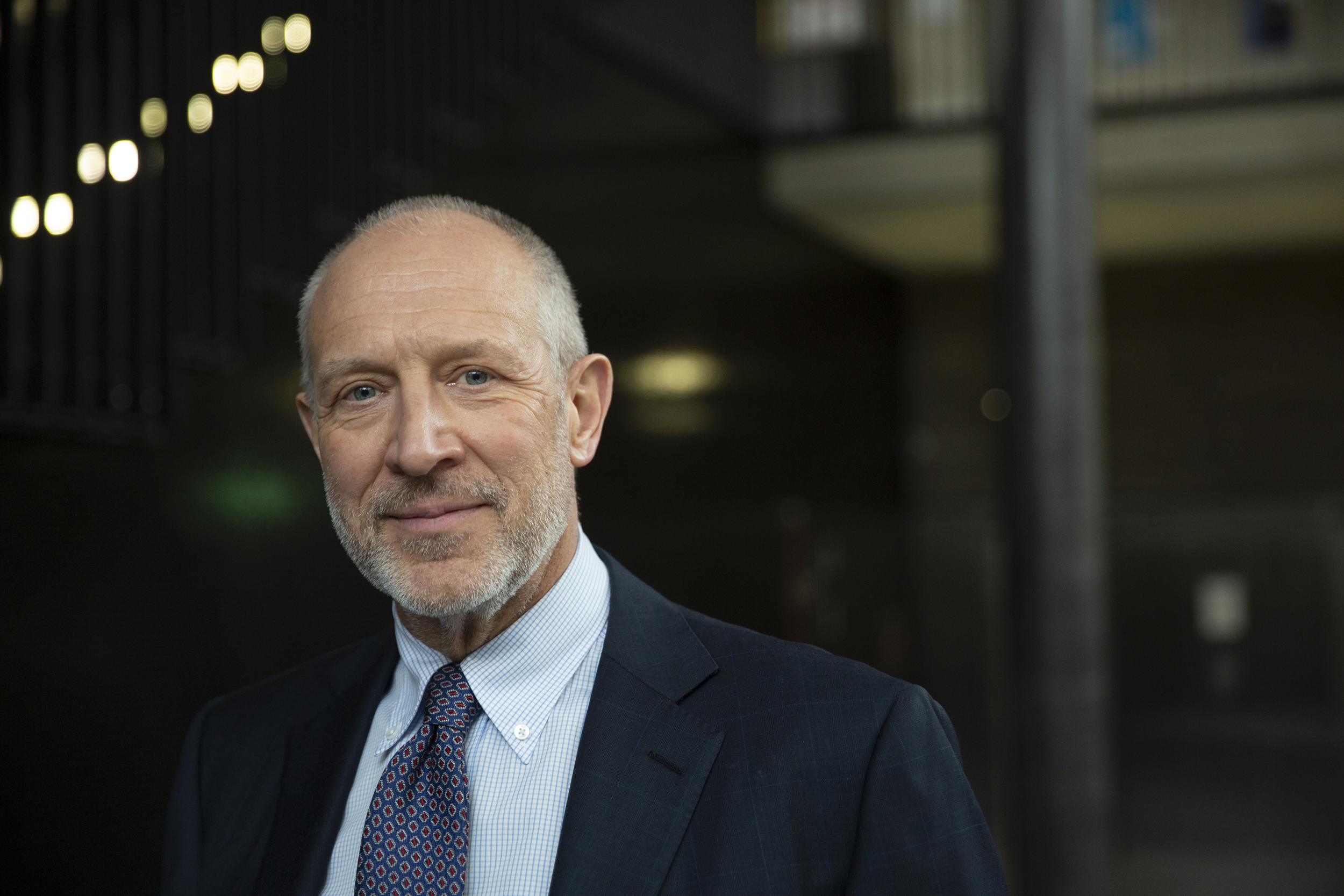
- Henry Peter in 2019
- Born: 1957 (age 68–69)
- Citizenship: Swiss; French
- Education: University of Geneva (PhD)
- Occupations: Professor of Law; Lawyer
- Awards: Knight First Class Royal Order of the Polar Star (2005); Knight of the Legion of Honour (2021)

Henry Peter (born 1957) is a Swiss and French lawyer specialising in business law and sports law. He is a professor emeritus at the University of Geneva, where he founded the Geneva Centre for Philanthropy in 2017 and served as its director until the end of 2024. Since 1 January 2025, he has chaired the Aventinus Foundation, which owns the Swiss newspaper Le Temps.

== Biography ==
=== Education ===
Henry Peter completed his studies at the University of Geneva, where he obtained a law degree in 1979. After an internship at the law firm Brunschwig, Biaggi & Lévy in Geneva between 1979 and 1981 and being admitted to the bar in Geneva, he returned to his alma mater and earned a post-graduate diploma in business law in 1983.

With the support of a grant from the Swiss National Science Foundation, he pursued doctoral research and spent the 1983–1984 academic year at the Faculty of Law of the University of California, Berkeley. In the summer of 1984, he briefly joined the Carter Ledyard & Milburn law firm in New York City. After returning to Switzerland the same year, he became a lawyer in Lugano while simultaneously working on his doctoral thesis, which he defended in 1988 on the subject of "Voidable transfers in groups of companies".

=== Legal career ===
From 1988 to 2006, he was a partner at Sganzini, Bernasconi, Peter & Gaggini in Lugano. He then worked as a senior partner at Peter, Bernasconi & Partners from 2006 to 2009, and then as a senior partner at PSMLaw from 2009 to 2017. In 2017, PSMLaw merged with Kellerhals Carrard and Henry Peter became a partner at their Lugano office.

He specialises in mergers and acquisitions, corporate governance and corporate social responsibility. Since 1985, he has also practised sports law, initially in Formula One as a lawyer for Ferrari. Working with Jean Todt, he negotiated the contract signed with Michael Schumacher in 1995 that brought the driver to Scuderia Ferrari. In 1999, he was part of the legal team representing Ferrari before the International Court of Appeal of the FIA in its appeal against the disqualification of both cars from the Malaysian Grand Prix. The appeal was upheld and the original race classification reinstated. In 2007, he represented Ferrari in the sporting proceedings concerning the espionage case involving McLaren, commonly known as the "spy story". He also regularly serves as chair or member of arbitral tribunals in commercial and sports law disputes.

He worked on legal matters arising from the bankruptcy of the Swissair group, whose proceedings continued throughout the 2000s. In 2016, following the FIFA corruption scandal, he publicly called for a comprehensive overhaul of the federation's statutes and organisational culture.

=== Institutional roles and board memberships ===
From 2004 to 2015, he was a member of the Swiss Takeover Board, the federal authority responsible for supervising public takeover bids. He has been a member of the Sanctions Commission of SIX Swiss Exchange since 2007 and became its vice-chair in 2026. He has also served on the editorial board of the Swiss Journal of Business and Financial Market Law.

He chaired the Geneva Business Law Association from 2003 to 2006 and was a member of the expert group on debt restructuring procedures established by the Swiss Federal Office of Justice from 2003 to 2008. He also served on the board of the Swiss Arbitration Association and chaired its Italian-speaking Swiss section from its establishment in 2003 until 2023.

In sports law, he served as vice-president of the Swiss Sports Disciplinary Chamber of the Swiss Olympic Association from 2001 to 2024 and was a member of the FIA ethics committee from 2014 to 2022. He also served on the arbitration bodies for the 31st, 32nd, 33rd and 36th editions of the America's Cup. He chairs the arbitration panel for the 38th edition.

He is vice-chair of the board of directors of Banque Lombard Odier & Cie and a board member of Ermenegildo Zegna. In 2026, after serving for 20 years on the board of Swiss Life Holding, he left the board and became chair of Swiss Life France, the group's French subsidiary. From 1994 to 2010, he served as honorary consul of Sweden for Italian-speaking Switzerland.

=== Academic career ===
Alongside his legal practice, he taught at the Faculty of Law of the University of Geneva from 1988 to 2024, serving as a full professor from 2004 to 2024. From 1998 to 2012, he directed the Master in Business Law programme jointly run by the universities of Geneva and Lausanne, and from 2006 to 2017 he headed the faculty's Business Law Department. In 2017, he founded the Geneva Centre for Philanthropy. He served as its director until the end of 2024. In December 2024, shortly after announcing the Media Philanthropy Initiative, he was appointed chair of the Aventinus Foundation, which owns the newspaper Le Temps. He took up the position on 1 January 2025. Following his retirement from teaching, he remains chair of the university's Sports Commission and a member of its Audit Committee.

He has taught or given lectures at other institutions, including Jean Moulin University Lyon 3, the University of Fribourg, the University of Zurich, the University of Italian Switzerland, the International Academy of Sport Science and Technology in Lausanne, the Swiss Judicial Academy in Neuchâtel and the Duke Summer Institute.

=== Activities in Ticino ===
In Ticino, where he lives, he is a member of the council of the Università della Svizzera italiana (USI), chairs the Foundation for the Lugano Faculties of USI and chairs the foundation board of the Museo d'arte della Svizzera italiana (MASI). Since January 2026, he has chaired the Babel association, which organises a festival dedicated to literature and translation in Bellinzona.

== Honours ==
In 2005, he was appointed a Knight First Class of the Swedish Order of the Polar Star. On 14 July 2021, Henry Peter was made a Knight of the French Legion of Honour.

== Publications ==
He is the author or co-author of more than a hundred publications. He has contributed to the Commentaire romand, a commentary on Swiss law, and co-edited The Routledge Handbook of Taxation and Philanthropy (Routledge, 2021) and The International Handbook of Social Enterprise Law (Springer, 2023), as well as six volumes on America's Cup arbitration decisions.
