= List of prime ministers of Canada by birthdate, birthplace, and age =

This is a list of the prime ministers of Canada by date, birthplace, and age. Twenty-four people have served as Prime Minister of Canada since the office came into existence in 1867.

Twenty of Canada's prime ministers have been born in Canada. Four of Canada's prime ministers have been born outside Canada: John A. Macdonald, Alexander Mackenzie, Mackenzie Bowell, and John Turner.

Names sort by order of birth Birth dates sort by day and month
Prime Minister	Birth date	Birthplace	Province/country	In office	Age taking office	Age leaving office	Post-premiership time	Death date	Age
Sir John A. Macdonald	January 11, 1815	Glasgow	Scotland	July 1, 1867 – November 5, 1873	52 years, 171 days	58 years, 298 days	4 years, 346 days	June 6, 1891	76 years, 146 days
Sir John A. Macdonald	January 11, 1815	Glasgow	Scotland	October 17, 1878 – June 6, 1891	63 years, 279 days	76 years, 146 days	0 days (Note: Died in office)	June 6, 1891	76 years, 146 days
Sir John Abbott	March 12, 1821	St. Andrews (now Saint-André-d'Argenteuil)	Lower Canada now Quebec	June 16, 1891 – November 24, 1892	70 years, 96 days	71 years, 257 days	340 days	October 30, 1893	72 years, 232 days
Sir Charles Tupper	July 2, 1821	Amherst	Nova Scotia	May 1 – July 8, 1896	74 years, 304 days	75 years, 6 days	19 years, 114 days	October 30, 1915	94 years, 120 days
Alexander Mackenzie	January 28, 1822	Logierait	Scotland	November 7, 1873 – October 8, 1878	51 years, 283 days	56 years, 253 days	13 years, 192 days	April 17, 1892	70 years, 80 days
Sir Mackenzie Bowell	December 27, 1823	Rickinghall	England	December 21, 1894 – April 27, 1896	70 years, 359 days	72 years, 122 days	21 years, 227 days	December 10, 1917	93 years, 348 days
Sir Wilfrid Laurier	November 20, 1841	Saint-Lin (now Saint-Lin-Laurentides)	Canada East now Quebec	July 11, 1896 – October 6, 1911	54 years, 234 days	69 years, 320 days	7 years, 134 days	February 17, 1919	77 years, 120 days
Sir John Sparrow David Thompson	November 10, 1845	Halifax	Nova Scotia	December 5, 1892 – December 12, 1894	47 years, 25 days	49 years, 32 days	0 days	December 12, 1894	49 years, 32 days
Sir Robert Borden (Note: Borden headed a Conservative government until October 11, 1917 and then a Unionist government for the remainder of his term as prime minister.)	June 26, 1854	Grand-Pré	Nova Scotia	October 10, 1911 – July 10, 1920	57 years, 106 days	66 years, 14 days	16 years, 335 days	June 10, 1937	82 years, 349 days
R. B. Bennett	July 3, 1870	Hopewell Hill	New Brunswick	August 7, 1930 – October 23, 1935	60 years, 35 days	65 years, 112 days	11 years, 246 days	June 26, 1947	76 years, 358 days
Arthur Meighen	June 16, 1874	Anderson (now Perth South)	Ontario	July 10, 1920 – December 29, 1921	46 years, 24 days	47 years, 196 days	4 years, 182 days	August 5, 1960	86 years, 50 days
Arthur Meighen	June 16, 1874	Anderson (now Perth South)	Ontario	June 29 – September 25, 1926	52 years, 13 days	52 years, 101 days	33 years, 315 days	August 5, 1960	86 years, 50 days
William Lyon Mackenzie King	December 17, 1874	Berlin (now Kitchener)	Ontario	December 29, 1921 – June 28, 1926	47 years, 12 days	51 years, 193 days	89 days	July 22, 1950	75 years, 217 days
William Lyon Mackenzie King	December 17, 1874	Berlin (now Kitchener)	Ontario	September 25, 1926 – August 7, 1930	51 years, 282 days	55 years, 233 days	5 years, 77 days	July 22, 1950	75 years, 217 days
William Lyon Mackenzie King	December 17, 1874	Berlin (now Kitchener)	Ontario	October 23, 1935 – November 15, 1948	60 years, 310 days	73 years, 334 days	1 year, 249 days	July 22, 1950	75 years, 217 days
Louis St. Laurent	February 1, 1882	Compton	Quebec	November 15, 1948 – June 21, 1957	66 years, 288 days	75 years, 140 days	16 years, 34 days	July 25, 1973	91 years, 174 days
John Diefenbaker	September 18, 1895	Neustadt	Ontario	June 21, 1957 – April 22, 1963	61 years, 276 days	67 years, 216 days	16 years, 116 days	August 16, 1979	83 years, 332 days
Lester B. Pearson	April 23, 1897	Newtonbrook (now a part of Toronto)	Ontario	April 22, 1963 – April 20, 1968	65 years, 364 days	70 years, 363 days	4 years, 251 days	December 27, 1972	75 years, 248 days
Pierre Trudeau	October 18, 1919	Montreal	Quebec	April 20, 1968 – June 4, 1979	48 years, 185 days	59 years, 229 days	273 days	September 28, 2000	80 years, 346 days
Pierre Trudeau	October 18, 1919	Montreal	Quebec	March 3, 1980 – June 30, 1984	60 years, 137 days	64 years, 256 days	16 years, 90 days	September 28, 2000	80 years, 346 days
John Turner	June 7, 1929	Richmond	England	June 30 – September 17, 1984	55 years, 23 days	55 years, 102 days	36 years, 2 days	September 19, 2020	91 years, 74 days
Jean Chrétien	January 11, 1934	Shawinigan	Quebec	November 4, 1993 – December 12, 2003	59 years, 297 days	69 years, 335 days	22 years, 137 days	living	92 years, 107 days
Paul Martin	August 28, 1938	Windsor	Ontario	December 12, 2003 – February 6, 2006	65 years, 106 days	67 years, 162 days	20 years, 81 days	living	87 years, 243 days
Brian Mulroney	March 20, 1939	Baie-Comeau	Quebec	September 17, 1984 – June 25, 1993	45 years, 181 days	54 years, 97 days	30 years, 249 days	February 29, 2024	84 years, 346 days
Joe Clark	June 5, 1939	High River	Alberta	June 4, 1979 – March 3, 1980	39 years, 364 days	40 years, 272 days	46 years, 56 days	living	86 years, 327 days
Kim Campbell	March 10, 1947	Port Alberni	British Columbia	June 25 – November 4, 1993	46 years, 107 days	46 years, 239 days	32 years, 175 days	living	79 years, 49 days
Stephen Harper	April 30, 1959	Leaside	Ontario	February 6, 2006 – November 4, 2015	46 years, 282 days	56 years, 188 days	10 years, 175 days	living	66 years, 363 days
Justin Trudeau	December 25, 1971	Ottawa	Ontario	November 4, 2015 – March 14, 2025	43 years, 314 days	53 years, 79 days	1 year, 45 days	living	54 years, 124 days
Mark Carney	March 16, 1965	Fort Smith	Northwest Territories	March 14, 2025–present	59 years, 363 days	incumbent	incumbent	living	61 years, 43 days

== Statistics ==
=== Birthplaces ===
Prime ministers of Canada by place of birth
Province/territory/country	Number
Ontario	7
Quebec (Note: Includes Lower Canada and Canada East)	6
Nova Scotia	3
England	2
Scotland	2
Alberta	1
British Columbia	1
New Brunswick	1
Northwest Territories	1

=== Birth dates ===
Prime ministers of Canada by month of birth
Month	Number
January	3
February	1
March	4
April	2
May	0
June	4
July	2
August	1
September	1
October	1
November	2
December	3

==== Season of birth of Prime ministers ====

- Winter: 10
- Spring: 5
- Summer: 5
- Autumn: 4

== Map of birthplaces ==
Birthplaces of prime ministers of Canada born in Canada	Birthplaces of prime ministers of Canada born abroad

== See also ==
- Fathers of Confederation
- List of prime ministers of Australia by birthplace

== Sources ==
- Government of Canada. Library of Parliament. "Prime Ministers of Canada". Retrieved September 3, 2016.
