= 1863–1864 Whitaker–Fox ministry =

Former government of New Zealand

The Whitaker-Fox Ministry was a responsible government which held power in New Zealand from October 1863 to November 1864. Although Frederick Whitaker was the head of the government, he was never appointed premier as that office had yet to be established. Instead, he was attorney-general sitting in the Legislative Council while William Fox led the Government in the lower house.

== Background ==
Governor Grey, upon the fall of the Domett Ministry, attempted to convince Edward Stafford to form a replacement Cabinet; he refused and Grey went to William Fox, who recommended Frederick Whitaker. Whitaker, an Aucklander who favoured a vigorous war policy against the Kingitanga, led a government which pursued the policy of land confiscation and military settlement. There was also a provincialist streak to the Whitaker-Fox government, with the last restrictions on provincial borrowing being abolished.

Reader Wood went to London to seek a £3 million loan for war and reconstruction purposes, but the British government would guarantee only part of this loan, and also announced that the New Zealand government would soon be liable for the upkeep of British Army regiments utilised in New Zealand Wars – to the tune of £40 per soldier per year. When the government submitted to this dictate, the Opposition politician Frederick Weld announced a new policy of ‘self-reliance’ which prompted the fall of the Whitaker-Fox ministry barely a year after it had assumed office. Weld was then given an opportunity to prove the efficacy of his policy.

== Ministers ==
The following members served in the Whitaker-Fox Ministry:

Name	Portrait	Office	Term
Frederick Whitaker, MLC		Attorney-General	30 October 1863 – 24 November 1864
William Fox		Colonial Secretary with responsibility for Native Affairs	30 October 1863 – 24 November 1864
Reader Wood		Colonial Treasurer	21 August 1862 – 24 November 1864
Reader Wood		Commissioner of Customs	21 August 1862 – 24 November 1864
Thomas Gillies		Postmaster-General	30 October 1863 – 24 November 1864
Thomas Gillies		Secretary for Crown Lands	5 November 1863 – 13 January 1864
Thomas Russell		Minister for Colonial Defence	22 July 1863 – 24 November 1864

== See also ==
- New Zealand Government
