= Harry Peters (mountaineer) =

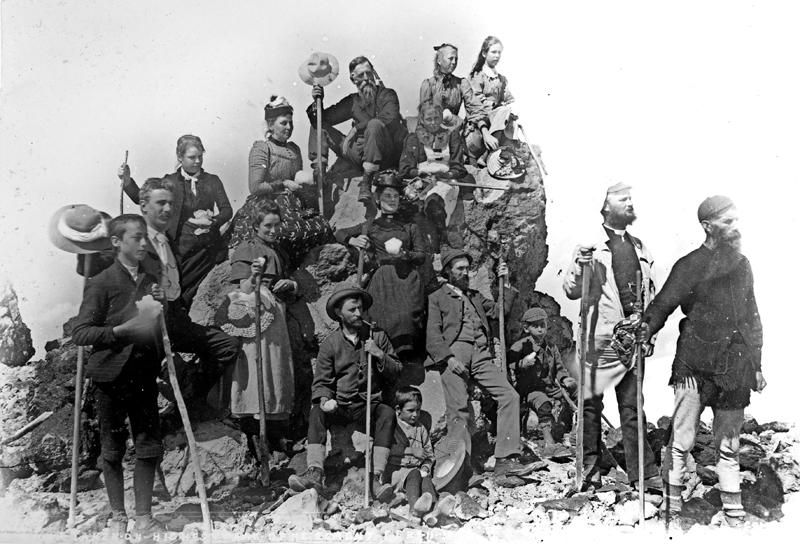
- Harry Peters, standing far right, with a party of climbers on the summit of Mount Taranaki, 11 Feb 1892
- Born: Peter Hinrik Peters; 28 April 1852; Heide, Germany
- Died: 9 May 1941 (aged 89); New Plymouth, New Zealand
- Occupations: Farmer; Mountaineer

Harry Peters (28 April 1852 – 9 May 1941) was a German-born New Zealander, who was a mountaineer and helped to establish the main climbing route up Mount Taranaki. Born near Heide, Peters came to New Zealand in 1875. Within months of his arrival, he took up farming at Kaimiro in the Taranaki. His farm was on the slopes of Mount Taranaki and he first climbed the mountain in 1885, via a previously unused route. This became the popular route for ascending Mount Taranaki. From 1892 to 1898 he was the custodian of Tahurangi House, the permanent camp house that was established to serve as accommodation for climbers going up the mountain. He also served as a mountain guide, making nearly 90 ascents of Mount Taranaki until his retirement as custodian. For much of his later life, he was prominent in civic affairs in the region.

== Early life ==
Harry Peters was born near Heide, in Holstein (now Schleswig-Holstein), Germany, to Johann Peters and his wife, Anna Catharina Elisabeth née Reinhold. His birth name was Peter Hinrik Peters and it was not until his arrival in July 1875 in New Zealand, as a crew member of the passenger ship Lammershagen, that he became known as Harry Peters. Few details are known of his life prior to arriving in New Zealand. Peters deserted from the Lammershagen soon after it docked at Wellington, following a dispute with one of the vessel's officers. He found employment at a farm nearby but after a few months travelled to the port of New Plymouth, in the Taranaki region, to work as a labourer in the fledgling town of Inglewood, which had recently been surveyed.

After a few years Peters took up farming, establishing a homestead on a block of land at Kaimiro, on the slopes of Mount Taranaki, then known as Mount Egmont. By this time he was married with a young family. His wife, Auguste Peters née Schreck, was an immigrant to New Zealand who had also arrived in the country aboard the Lammershagen.

== Climbing ==
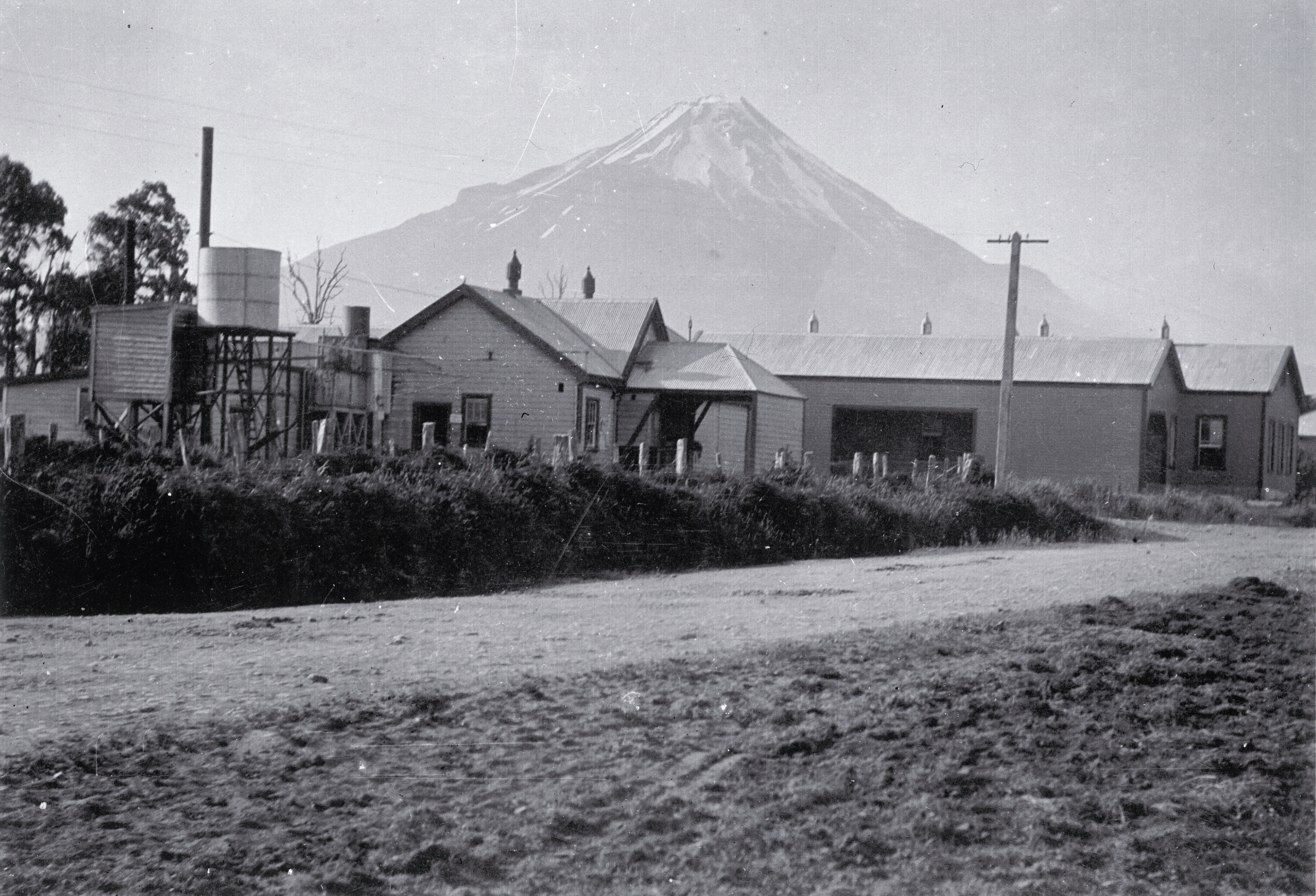
A view of Mount Taranaki, 1910

Peters first climbed Mount Taranaki in 1885, using a generally unused route to the top. Prior to his ascent, the preferred route required a traverse of the Pouakai Range. Peters subsequently reported that he only discovered the route by accident, while looking for lost cattle. On initially reporting his finding to the authorities in New Plymouth he was not believed and it required some persuasion on his part for a survey of the route to be completed the next year. Over time the route that he discovered on his first climb became the favoured track to the top and a campsite was established on the northern slopes, close to the upper bush line. It was recognised that some form of permanent structure would be desirable to serve as accommodation for those climbing the mountain. In 1891, he helped organise the relocation of a building from the military barracks at New Plymouth to serve as a permanent camp house at the site. Formally opened the following year and named Tahurangi House, Peters was appointed its custodian.

In addition to his farming, in which he was greatly assisted by his wife, he began to guide climbing expeditions up the mountain. One of his clients was the former New Zealand premier, Sir William Fox, aged 80 at the time. He helped Fox, who was endeavouring to show that abstention made him fitter than men much younger than him, attain the peak of Mount Taranaki in February 1892, a feat that took 18 hours. By the time of his retirement in 1898 as custodian, Peters had led nearly 90 expeditions to the peak of the mountain.

== Later life ==
Peters was a prominent community leader in Kaimiro, serving as a member of the Taranaki Hospital and Charitable Aid Board and was also on the Moa Road Board; he was the chairman of the latter organisation from 1893 to 1896. For the same period, he was on the Taranaki County Council. For a time he was a director of the local dairy co-operative. In his later years, he served as Kaimiro's postmaster and wrote for one of the regional newspapers. In the years of the Great Depression, a portion of the Peters farm was sold off.

In July 1921, Peter's wife died at the age of 63. By this time, the couple had seven children, all of whom lived in Inglewood or the surrounding area. Peters died on 9 May 1941 in New Plymouth. Buried in Inglewood cemetery, his descendants continued to be involved in the community around the district, with a grandson running the family farm as recently as 2011.
