= List of prime ministers of Australia by military service =

Of the 31 individuals who have served as prime minister of Australia, 8 have had prior or concurrent military service, while 23 have had no prior military service. Despite the fact that the democratically accountable Australian Cabinet (chaired by the prime minister) de facto controls the Australian Defence Force, prior military service is not a prerequisite for prime ministers of Australia. They are as follows:

No.	Portrait	Name (birth–death) Constituency	Military service						Notes
No.	Portrait	Name (birth–death) Constituency	Rank	Branch/service	Years of service	Allegiance	Unit	Battles/wars	Notes
1		Edmund Barton (1849–1920) MP for Hunter, NSW	Has no prior military service						
2		Alfred Deakin (1856–1919) MP for Ballaarat, Vic (Note: Ballarat was spelt Ballaarat until the 1973 election.)	Has no prior military service						
3		Chris Watson (1867–1941) MP for Bland, NSW	Has no prior military service						
4		George Reid (1845–1918) MP for East Sydney, NSW	Has no prior military service						
(2)		Alfred Deakin (1856–1919) MP for Ballaarat, Vic	Has no prior military service						
5		Andrew Fisher (1862–1928) MP for Wide Bay, Qld	Has no prior military service						
(2)		Alfred Deakin (1856–1919) MP for Ballaarat, Vic	Has no prior military service						
(5)		Andrew Fisher (1862–1928) MP for Wide Bay, Qld	Has no prior military service						
6		Joseph Cook (1860–1947) MP for Parramatta, NSW	Has no prior military service						
(5)		Andrew Fisher (1862–1928) MP for Wide Bay, Qld	Has no prior military service						
7		Billy Hughes (1862–1952) MP for West Sydney, NSW (until 1917) MP for Bendigo, Vic (1917–22) MP for North Sydney, NSW (from 1922)		British Army	1874–1884	United Kingdom	Royal Fusiliers (volunteer battalion)	*None	Joined a volunteer battalion of the Royal Fusiliers while a teenager in London. Claimed to have served briefly in both the Queensland Defence Force and the Queensland Maritime Defence Force, but biographers have not been able to verify this. Hughes in his Royal Fusiliers uniform.
7		Billy Hughes (1862–1952) MP for West Sydney, NSW (until 1917) MP for Bendigo, Vic (1917–22) MP for North Sydney, NSW (from 1922)	Unknown	Queensland Defence Force	Unknown	United Kingdom	Unknown	*None	Joined a volunteer battalion of the Royal Fusiliers while a teenager in London. Claimed to have served briefly in both the Queensland Defence Force and the Queensland Maritime Defence Force, but biographers have not been able to verify this. Hughes in his Royal Fusiliers uniform.
7		Billy Hughes (1862–1952) MP for West Sydney, NSW (until 1917) MP for Bendigo, Vic (1917–22) MP for North Sydney, NSW (from 1922)	Unknown	Queensland Maritime Defence Force	Unknown	United Kingdom	Unknown	*None	Joined a volunteer battalion of the Royal Fusiliers while a teenager in London. Claimed to have served briefly in both the Queensland Defence Force and the Queensland Maritime Defence Force, but biographers have not been able to verify this. Hughes in his Royal Fusiliers uniform.
8		Stanley Bruce (1883–1967) MP for Flinders, Vic	Captain	British Army	1914–1917	United Kingdom	2nd Battalion, Royal Fusiliers	World War 1	Was severely wounded at Gallipoli; awarded the Military Cross and the Croix de Guerre avec Palme.
9		James Scullin (1876–1953) MP for Yarra, Vic	Has no prior military service						
10		Joseph Lyons (1879–1939) MP for Wilmot, Tas	Has no prior military service						
11		Earle Page (1880–1961) MP for Cowper, NSW	Captain	Australian Army	1916–1917	Australia	Australian Army Medical Corps	World War 1	Officer in the Australian Army Medical Corps, stationed in Egypt and France during World War I
12		Robert Menzies (1894–1978) MP for Kooyong, Vic	Has no prior military service						
13		Arthur Fadden (1894–1973) MP for Darling Downs, Qld	Has no prior military service						
14		John Curtin (1885–1945) MP for Fremantle, WA	Has no prior military service						
15		Frank Forde (1890–1983) MP for Capricornia, Qld	Has no prior military service						
16		Ben Chifley (1885–1951) MP for Macquarie, NSW	Has no prior military service						
(12)		Robert Menzies (1894–1978) MP for Kooyong, Vic	Has no prior military service						
17		Harold Holt (1908–1967) MP for Higgins, Vic	Gunner	Second Australian Imperial Force, Australian Army	1939–1940	Australia	2/4th Field Regiment	World War II	Enlisted in the Army in 1939 while a Member of Parliament and was a gunner for 5 months before being recalled after the death of three senior ministers in the Canberra air disaster in 1940.
18		John McEwen (1900–1980) MP for Murray, Vic	Private	Australian Army	1918	Australia		World War 1 (did not see conflict)	Enlisted in the Army in 1918, and was in camp awaiting embarkation for France when the armistice was declared.
19		Sir John Gorton (1911–2002) MP for Higgins, Vic	Flight Lieutenant	Royal Australian Air Force	1940–1944	Australia	No. 61 Operational Training Unit RAF; No. 232 Squadron RAF; No. 77 Squadron RAAF; No. 2 Operational Conversion Unit RAAF	World War II	Enlisted in the Royal Australian Air Force (RAAF) in 1940. A fighter pilot in World War II, flying Hurricanes out of Singapore and later Kittyhawks out of Milne Bay, Flight Lieutenant Gorton had three serious crashes, one of which gave him serious facial injuries. He also survived being torpedoed by a Japanese submarine while evacuating from Singapore aboard an ammunition ship, spending 24 hours in the water before rescue. John Gorton prior to leaving for war service in 1941
20		William McMahon (1908–1988) MP for Lowe, NSW	Major	Second Australian Imperial Force, Australian Army	1940–1945	Australia	6th Division	World War II	Enlisted in the Army in 1939/40. Reached rank of Major, but due to a hearing impediment was deemed unfit for overseas service and was confined to work in Australia, where he was a quartermaster for the II Corps and the Second Army.
21		Gough Whitlam (1916–2014) MP for Werriwa, NSW	Flight Lieutenant	Royal Australian Air Force	1941–1945	Australia	No. 13 Squadron	World War II	Served in World War II in the RAAF as a navigator, reached the rank of Flight Lieutenant. Stationed in northern Australia, protecting convoys and conducting bombing raids on islands to the north.
22		Malcolm Fraser (1930–2015) MP for Wannon, Vic	Has no prior military service						
23		Bob Hawke (1929–2019) MP for Wills, Vic	Has no prior military service						
24		Paul Keating (b. 1944) MP for Blaxland, NSW	Has no prior military service						
25		John Howard (b. 1939) MP for Bennelong, NSW	Has no prior military service						
26		Kevin Rudd (b. 1957) MP for Griffith, Qld	Has no prior military service						
27		Julia Gillard (b. 1961) MP for Lalor, Vic	Has no prior military service						
(26)		Kevin Rudd (b. 1957) MP for Griffith, Qld	Has no prior military service						
28		Tony Abbott (b. 1957) MP for Warringah, NSW	Has no prior military service						
29		Malcolm Turnbull (b. 1954) MP for Wentworth, NSW	Has no prior military service						
30		Scott Morrison (b. 1968) MP for Cook, NSW	Has no prior military service						
31		Anthony Albanese (b. 1963) MP for Grayndler, NSW	Has no prior military service						
