= 1864–1865 Weld ministry =

Former government of New Zealand

The Weld ministry was the seventh responsible government to be formed in New Zealand, and lasted a less than a year during the New Zealand Wars. It formed in November 1864 and lasted until October 1865. As the office of premier had yet to be formally established, Frederick Weld was never gazetted premier but did resign the position at the end of his tenure.

== Background ==
In September 1864, the Fox–Whitaker government collapsed amid Governor Grey's rejection of their hard-line land confiscation policy towards Māori, and the British Parliament's rejection of the full sum of their proposed £3 million loan. The British also desired to remove the last of the Imperial regiments unless the New Zealand Government paid them £40 annually per soldier. This raised the opposition of South Island interests, who had a much lower Māori population and resented having to pay for wars in the North Island.

In October, therefore, Frederick Weld announced an alternative policy of "self-reliance", accepting the removal of the regiments and the management of defence policy by the colonial government. He took office on the first day of the new session of the General Assembly. However, the policy was never fully implemented as fresh outbreaks of violence in Taranaki and the East Cape delayed the departure of General Cameron. Cameron followed his own strategy, while Governor Grey gave orders to the colonial militia without ministerial advice. Land confiscations and road-making through Māori districts continued under the Weld ministry, while the financial situation forced them to increase customs duties and accept a higher rate of interest on an overseas loan.

During this ministry, the capital was moved to Wellington and a steamer service to Panama was established. However, the Government’s financial position became more precarious than ever. A provincialist motion of no confidence (to give half the revenue of the new stamp duty to the provincial governments) was moved by Julius Vogel and only defeated on the Speaker's casting vote. Weld resigned anyway, and Edward Stafford was recalled to lead a new ministry.

== Ministers ==
The following members served in the Weld ministry:

Name	Portrait	Office	Term
Frederick Weld		Premier	24 November 1864 – 16 October 1865
Frederick Weld		Colonial Secretary	24 November 1864 – 26 June 1865
Henry Sewell, MLC		Attorney-General	24 November 1864 – 16 October 1865
William Fitzherbert		Colonial Treasurer	24 November 1864 – 16 October 1865
William Fitzherbert		Commissioner of Customs	24 November 1864 – 3 April 1865
John Richardson		Postmaster-General	24 November 1864 – 16 October 1865
John Richardson		Commissioner of Customs	3 April 1865 – 16 October 1865
Harry Atkinson		Minister for Colonial Defence	24 November 1864 – 16 October 1865
Walter Mantell		Minister for Native Affairs	16 December 1864 – 27 July 1865
Walter Mantell		Native Secretary	3 April 1865 – 27 July 1865
James Crowe Richmond, MLC		Colonial Secretary	26 June 1865 – 16 October 1865
James FitzGerald		Minister for Native Affairs	12 August 1865 – 16 October 1865

== See also ==
- New Zealand Government
