= Donald McLean (New Zealand politician) =

New Zealand politician and government official (1820–1877)

Sir Donald McLean KCMG
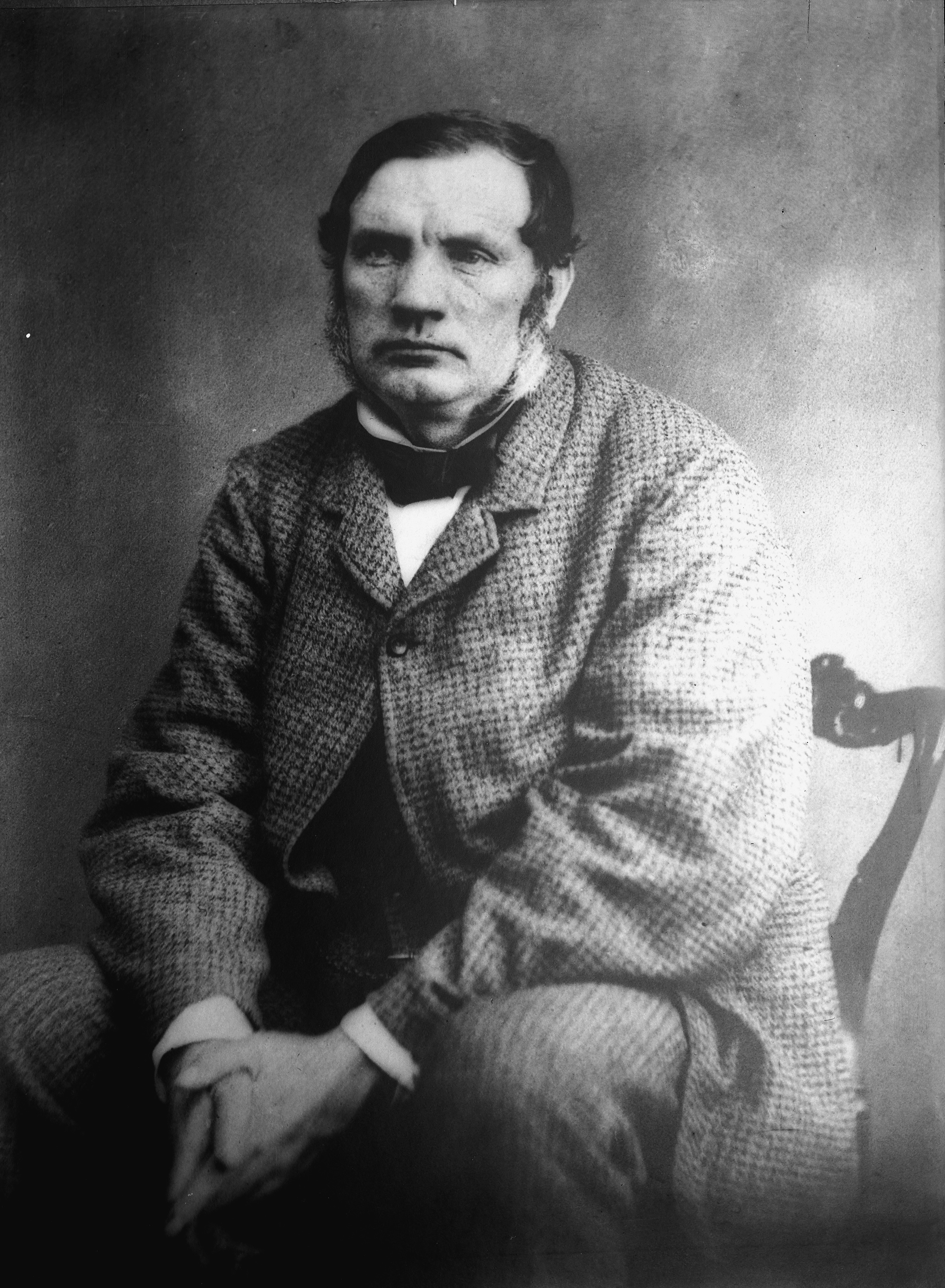
- Donald McLean in the 1870s

4th Minister of Native Affairs and Colonial Defence
- In office 28 June 1869 – 10 September 1872
- Prime Minister: William Fox
- Preceded by: Theodore Haultain
- Succeeded by: John Ballance

9th Minister of Native Affairs
- In office 28 June 1869 – 10 September 1872
- Prime Minister: William Fox
- Preceded by: James Crowe Richmond
- Succeeded by: himself
- In office 11 October 1872 – 7 December 1876
- Preceded by: himself
- Succeeded by: Daniel Pollen

Member of the New Zealand Parliament for Napier
- In office 20 March 1866 – 5 January 1877

3rd Superintendent of Hawke's Bay Province
- In office 26 February 1863 – 23 September 1869
- Preceded by: John Chilton Lambton Carter
- Succeeded by: John Davies Ormond

Personal details
- Born: 27 October 1820 Tiree, Scotland
- Died: 5 January 1877 (aged 56) Napier, New Zealand
- Spouse: Susan Douglas Strang (m. 1851, d. 1852)
- Relations: Douglas Maclean (son)

Sir Donald McLean KCMG (27 October 1820 – 5 January 1877) was a 19th-century New Zealand politician and government official. He was involved in negotiations between the settler government and Māori from 1844 to 1861, eventually as Native Secretary and Land Purchase commissioner. He was one of the most influential figures in Māori-Pākehā relations in the mid-1800s and was involved in the dispute over the "Waitara Purchase", which led up to the First Taranaki War.

== Early life ==
He was born on the Hebridean island of Tiree, and came to New Zealand via Australia in 1840. He married Susan Douglas Strang, daughter of the registrar of the Supreme Court in Wellington, Robert Strang, on 28 August 1851. She died after giving birth to their son Douglas in December 1852 and her death deeply affected McLean; he never remarried.

== Political career ==
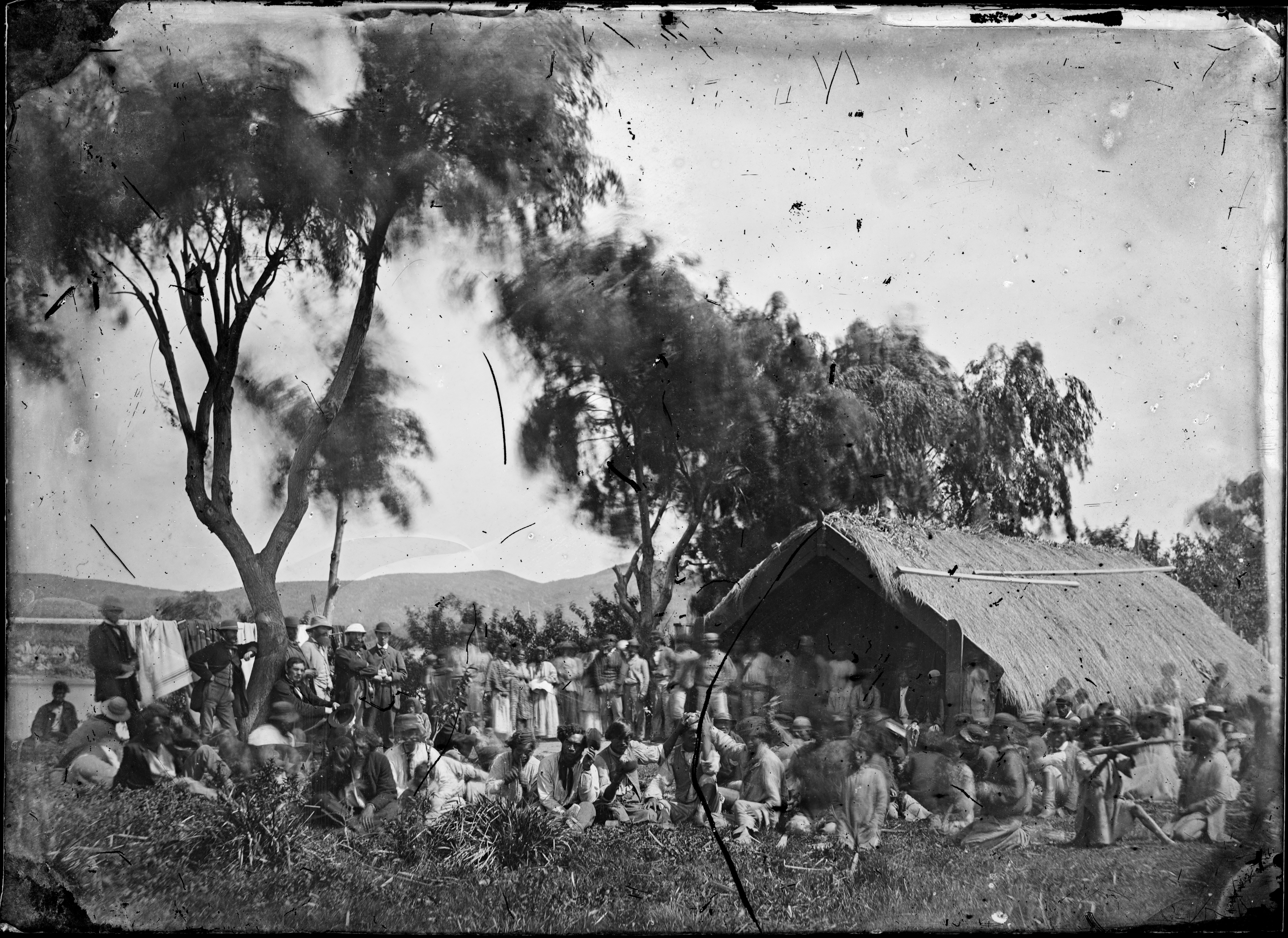
Donald McLean purchasing land at Wairoa, Hawke's Bay

McLean was involved in negotiations between the settler government and Māori from 1844 to 1861, eventually as Native Secretary and Land Purchase commissioner. He was involved in the dispute over the "Waitara Purchase", which led up to the First Taranaki War. He was one of the most influential figures in Māori-Pākehā relations in the mid-1800s.

He was elected Superintendent of Hawke's Bay Province on 26 February 1863 and served until the end of the term on 10 January 1867. He was re-elected on 9 May 1867 and served until his resignation on 3 September 1869. In addition, he was a member of the Hawke's Bay Provincial Council, representing the Napier Country electorate in the 2nd Council (1862–1867) and the Napier Town electorate in the 3rd Council (1867–1871).

New Zealand Parliament
Years	Term	Electorate	Party
1866–1870	4th	Napier	Independent
1871–1875	5th	Napier	Independent
1875–1877	6th	Napier	Independent

He was a Member of Parliament for the Napier electorate in the 4th to 6th Parliament, from 1866 until his death in 1877.

In 1867 he introduced the law providing for four Māori electorates in Parliament from 1868. In the third Fox Ministry, he was Minister of Defence from 1869 to 1872 and Minister of Native Affairs. In the Waterhouse, fourth Fox, first Vogel, Pollen, second Vogel, first Atkinson and second Atkinson Ministries, he remained Minister of Native Affairs until he resigned as a minister on 7 December 1876, shortly before he died. In 1874 he was made a Knight Commander of the Order of St Michael and St George.

The National Library of New Zealand has digitised 100,000 pages of his papers, and the collection is featured on their website. The collection includes over 3,000 letters written to McLean by Māori from throughout New Zealand. It is the largest surviving group of 19th-century letters in Māori.

== Legacy ==
Te Rau-o-te-Huia / Mount Donald McLean in the Waitākere Ranges was named after McLean.

== Notes ==
Political offices
Preceded by John Chilton Lambton Carter	Superintendent of Hawke's Bay Province; 1863–1969	Succeeded by John Davies Ormond
Preceded by Theodore Haultain	Minister of (Native Affairs and) Colonial Defence; 1869–1872	Succeeded by John Ballance
Preceded by James Crowe Richmond	Minister of Native Affairs; 1869–1876	Succeeded by Daniel Pollen
New Zealand Parliament
Preceded by William Colenso	Member of Parliament for Napier; 1866–1877; Served alongside: William Russell	Succeeded by Fred Sutton; William Russell
