= William Fox (New Zealand politician) =

Premier of New Zealand (1812–1893)

The Right Honourable Sir William Fox KCMG
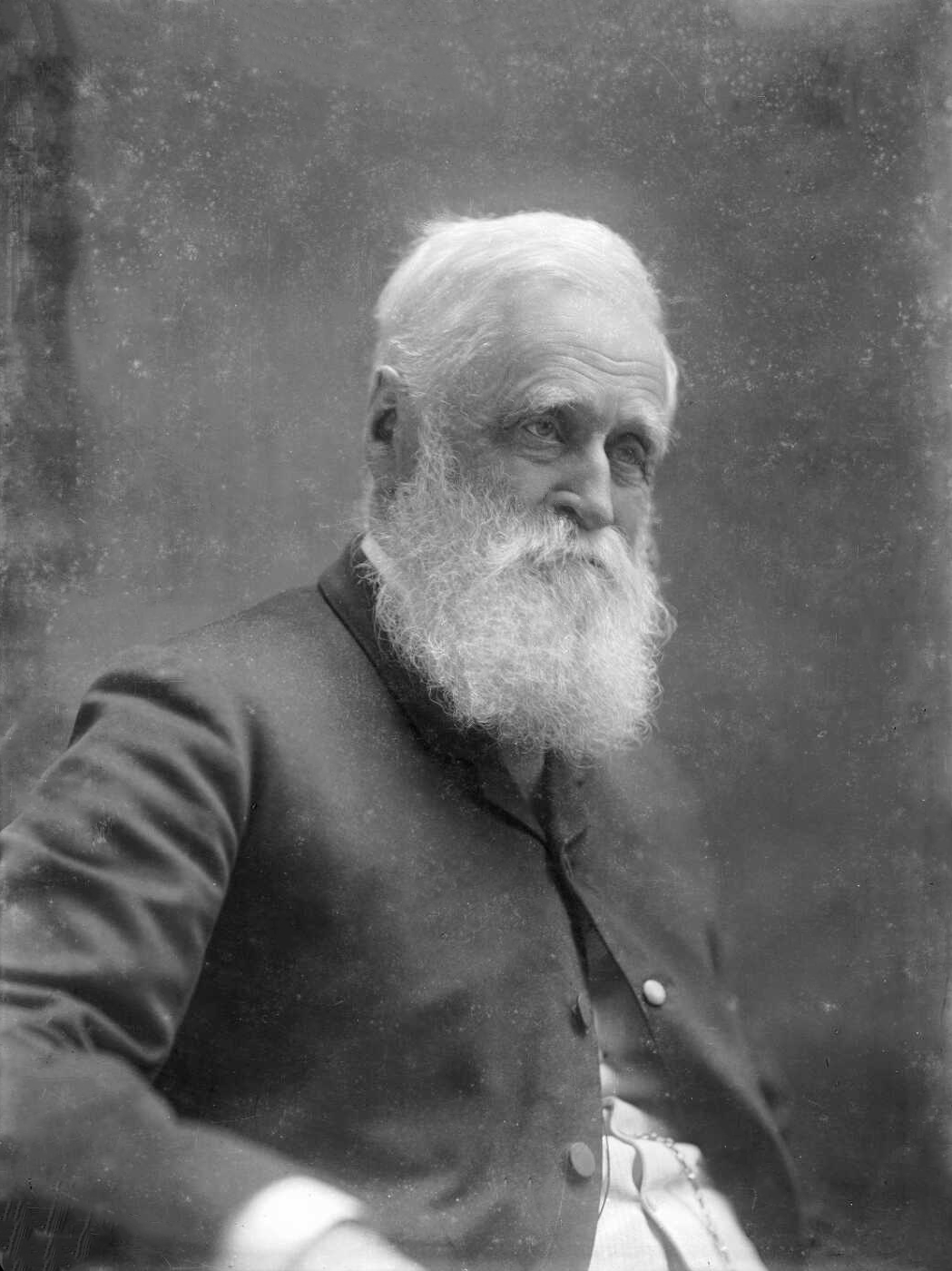
- Fox in 1890

2nd Premier of New Zealand
- In office 3 March 1873 – 8 April 1873
- Monarch: Victoria
- Governor: Sir George Bowen
- Preceded by: George Waterhouse
- Succeeded by: Julius Vogel
- In office 28 June 1869 – 10 September 1872
- Monarch: Victoria
- Governor: Sir George Bowen
- Preceded by: Edward Stafford
- Succeeded by: Edward Stafford
- In office 12 July 1861 – 6 August 1862
- Monarch: Victoria
- Governor: Thomas Gore Browne; Sir George Grey
- Preceded by: Edward Stafford
- Succeeded by: Alfred Domett
- In office 20 May 1856 – 2 June 1856
- Monarch: Victoria
- Governor: Thomas Gore Browne
- Preceded by: Henry Sewell
- Succeeded by: Edward Stafford

Personal details
- Born: 20 January 1812 South Shields, England
- Died: 23 June 1893 (aged 81) Auckland, New Zealand
- Party: None
- Spouse: Sarah Halcomb (m. 1842–1893)
- Children: Ngataua Omahuru, renamed William Fox (Jr.) (adopted)
- Education: Wadham College, Oxford
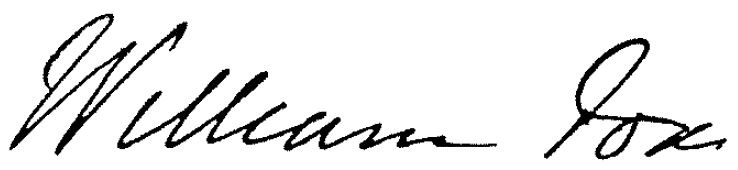
- Signature

Sir William Fox KCMG (20 January 1812 – 23 June 1893) was a New Zealand politician who was the second premier of New Zealand in 1856, from 1861 to 1862, from 1869 to 1872, and in 1873. Serving while New Zealand was still a British colony, he was known for his contributions to the education system (such as establishing the University of New Zealand), his social reform and opposition to alcohol, and his work to increase New Zealand's autonomy from Britain.

== Early life ==
Fox was born on 20 January 1812 at 5 Westoe Village in South Shields, then part of County Durham, in north-east England, and baptised on 2 September of that year; he was the son of the Rev. George Townshend Fox, a deputy lieutenant of co. Durham. He was educated initially at Durham School and matriculated at Wadham College, Oxford, in 1828, graduating B.A. 1832 and M.A. (by seniority) 1839. His activities for several years after graduating are a mystery.

In 1838 he studied law in London. He was called to the bar at the Inner Temple in 1842. Shortly after that he married Sarah Halcomb. The couple decided that they would emigrate to New Zealand.

Upon his arrival in Wellington, Fox's legal qualifications were recognised, but there was little work, and so he supplemented his income by writing for local periodicals. Fox lost the right to practice as a lawyer when, in 1843, he refused to swear an oath that he considered "degrading". This event forced him to focus almost entirely on writing and journalism. That year, following the death of Arthur Wakefield, Fox was appointed local agent for the New Zealand Company at Nelson.

== Early political activity ==
Initially, Fox was opposed to government negotiations with Māori over land, stating that Māori had a right only to land that they used. He also condemned the colonial government's "weak" response to the killing of Arthur Wakefield, a New Zealand Company official who had attempted to expand the settlement at Nelson into Māori-held lands. Fox's criticism of Governor Robert FitzRoy eventually played a part in FitzRoy's removal from office. In 1843 Fox was chosen by the New Zealand Company as Wakefield's replacement in Nelson.

In Nelson, Fox met with mixed success. There was little direct conflict with the Māori, and most of Fox's work was related to economic development. Poor planning and inaccurate land surveying had left colonists with considerably less than had been promised them, and Fox was responsible for resolving the matter. While many modern historians believe that he did a good job, Fox himself found that even his best efforts were not good enough for the angry colonists. Fox increasingly spent his time leading parties into the wilderness near Nelson, an activity which he seems to have enjoyed. Fox was physically active all through his life.

In 1848, William Wakefield died. As the New Zealand Company's senior officer in the colony, he was Fox's superior. Fox quickly travelled to Wellington, and managed to secure himself Wakefield's position. He accomplished this mainly because of the short distance between Nelson and Wellington, which enabled him to win the position before instructions could be received from other cities. He was not the first choice of the Company's board in London, which preferred Dillon Bell, but his quick action managed to gain him enough support to receive the appointment.

The Company was in decline after the deaths of both Edward and Arthur Wakefield. Fox gradually became less active in the Company, taking more of an interest in the colonial government. He was a strong opponent of Governor George Grey, had suspended the New Zealand Constitution Act 1846 to grant self-government to the settlers. He frequently denounced the administration and the judiciary as corrupt and incompetent.

In 1851, Fox travelled to London on behalf of a group of Wellington settlers. There he met Edward Gibbon Wakefield, elder brother of William and Arthur. He discussed his ideas about a constitution for New Zealand, strongly supporting self-rule, provincial autonomy, and two elected houses of parliament. He also attempted to meet Earl Grey, the Secretary of State for the Colonies but was refused. When the New Zealand Constitution Act 1852 was passed by Britain's parliament the following year, it incorporated some of Fox's ideas but was not satisfactory to him.

== Entry to Parliament ==
New Zealand Parliament
Years	Term	Electorate	Party
1855–1860	2nd	Wanganui	Independent
1861–1865	3rd	Rangitikei	Independent
1868–1870	4th	Rangitikei	Independent
1871–1875	5th	Rangitikei	Independent
1876–1879	6th	Wanganui	Independent
1880–1881	7th	Rangitikei	Independent

Before returning to New Zealand, Fox and his wife spent some time travelling in Canada, the United States, and Cuba. When they returned to New Zealand, the new constitution was in effect, and elections had already been held. In 1855 Fox was elected MP for Wanganui. He fought on a strong platform of provincial autonomy, and was particularly opposed to the government formed the following year by Henry Sewell, who took the newly created office of Premier of New Zealand. Fox managed to oust Sewell from the new post in only 13 days, becoming New Zealand's second Premier. Fox, however, lasted only 13 days himself before being ousted by Edward Stafford. Fox spent the first years of Stafford's premiership in semi-retirement, but later returned to be Stafford's primary opponent in parliament.

Fox appears to have changed his views somewhat regarding Māori land rights, as he strongly opposed the government's policy on that issue. He blamed Stafford's administration, along with Governor Thomas Gore Browne, for the wars in Taranaki, which broke out when a Māori chief refused to sell his land. Fox was widely believed to have converted to support of the Māori, although many modern historians claim that his opposition to land seizure was due to a pragmatic wish to avoid war, not a change of philosophy. Lack of evidence makes it difficult to tell which was the case.

== Premierships ==
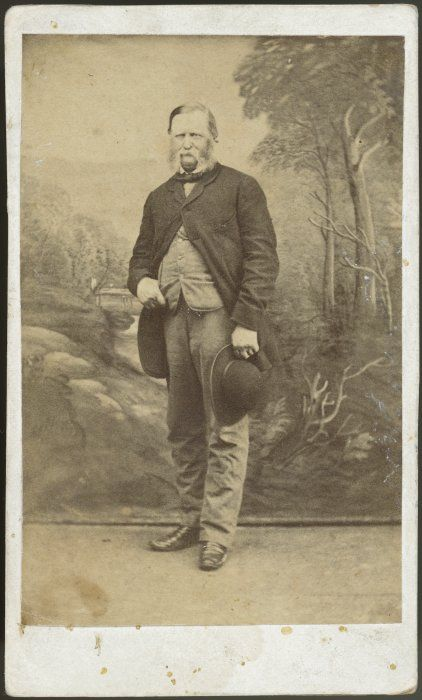
Fox between 1880 and 1893

In 1861, Fox successfully proposed a vote of no confidence in Stafford, and took the premiership again. Among the measures introduced were law changes designed to accommodate Māori political structures, a halt on attempts to acquire Māori land, and a less confrontational attitude in existing conflicts. Again, dispute exists as to whether this was motivated by pragmatism or support of Māori rights. His attempts to reduce conflict with Māori were undermined by Governor Grey, who had returned for another term, and was a strong believer in the need to confront Māori militarily. Grey's construction of military infrastructure and his deployment of troops reduced Māori trust of any initiatives by the government.

In 1862, Fox was a passenger on the SS White Swan together with several other senior members of the New Zealand government. The ship was holed by a rock while steaming from Napier to Wellington and began sinking. Captain Allen Harper deliberately ran the ship aground and thereby saved the lives of all those on board.

After becoming increasingly involved in a dispute with Grey over responsibility for policy towards Māori, Fox lost a vote of confidence in 1862. The following year he returned to government, but only as a minister – the premiership went to Frederick Whitaker. Fox appears to have had little to do with the policies of this government, which involved considerable confiscations of land from the Māori. After his term as a minister ended, Fox and his wife travelled in Australia for several years.

Upon returning to New Zealand, Fox was encouraged by the Opposition to return to politics, which was once again dominated by Fox's rival Edward Stafford. Fox was elected to parliament, and relaunched his attack on Stafford's policies on Māori relations and provincial affairs. Fox defeated Stafford in 1869, taking the premiership for the third time. Fox set about reducing military activities, and ceased any major attempts to engage the Māori with force. Increasingly Fox found himself overshadowed by his treasurer, Julius Vogel. Vogel's extensive plans for the development of New Zealand, involving borrowing money to finance public works, soon became the most prominent feature of Fox's government, but had little to do with Fox himself. Eventually, Fox began to abandon his leadership role within the government, and the resulting disunity allowed Stafford to defeat Fox in 1872.

After this, Fox decided that he would not seek further office. His role in politics, however, was not quite over – when George Waterhouse, Stafford's successor, suddenly resigned, Fox was called upon to assume the premiership as a caretaker until a new leader was found. When Vogel returned to New Zealand from an overseas trip Fox stepped down, and Vogel's premiership began.

He was the Member of Parliament for Wanganui and Rangitikei in the second parliament (1855–1860), Rangitikei in the third, fourth and fifth parliaments (1861–1865, when he resigned; 1868–1870; 1871–1875, when he resigned), Wanganui in the sixth parliament (1876–1879, when he was defeated), and Rangitikei again (1880–81, when he was defeated).

== William Fox Jr. ==
In 1868 at Te Ngutu O Te Manu (Beak of the bird), a battle took place between the forces of the Hah Hau rebel Riwha Tītokowaru and the Colonial army commanded by Thomas McDonnell. The colonial forces were ambushed and retreated. During the retreat, two Māori scouts found two boys who were about six years old. One boy was killed, and the other, Ngātau Omahuru, was given by Māori scout, Pirimona, to Herewini of the Ngāti Te Ūpokoiri iwi.

While in Whanganui the boy came to the attention of the magistrate Walter Buller, who purchased him a set of European clothes and boots. The boy's picture was taken in these clothes. The Buller family looked after the boy.

He was baptised William Fox in the presence of William Fox senior, then an MP. The young William was taken to Wellington by coach, probably on 25 January 1869. He was housed at a hostelry where visiting Māori lodged, lived there for three years, and was educated at a private school called Mowbray's near the hostelry. Three other Māori students, two of them the sons of Chief Wi Tako, attended the same school. The adopted son then moved in with the Fox family. According to Māori sources, William Junior and Mrs Sarah Fox, who was childless, became very close. He lived with the family until he was about 12.

In 1874 he was enrolled in the new Wellington College where he had a photo taken with the other students and staff on Inauguration Day 1874. In 1875 The Fox family took William Junior on a world tour to San Francisco by paddle steamer and then across the United States and on to Great Britain to visit Fox relatives.

At 16, William junior joined a law firm as a clerk with Buller, Lewis and Gully, where he received about five years training. On a trip to the Taranaki area in 1878 he met members of his tribe and a young Māori woman, Hinemoa. He met the Māori leaders Te Whiti and Tohu Kākahi at Parihaka, and decided to live in Taranaki. It appears he was heavily influenced by Te Whiti and Tohu and at some stage had an office in Tohu's meeting house at Parihaka. He set up a Māori school near Parihaka.

Later after the closure of Parihaka he worked as a translator and interpreter in Whanganui and then set up a business in Hawera teaching the Māori language. He never married. He corresponded with old soldiers about the Taranaki War and died in 1918.

== Later life ==
In 1879, Fox was appointed a Knight Commander of the Order of St Michael and St George (KCMG). He was appointed a commissioner to inquire into Native Land Titles.

Fox was involved in the temperance movement against alcohol. He was a founder of the New Zealand Alliance (for the Abolition of the Liquor Traffic), of which he was the first president, from 1887 to 1893.

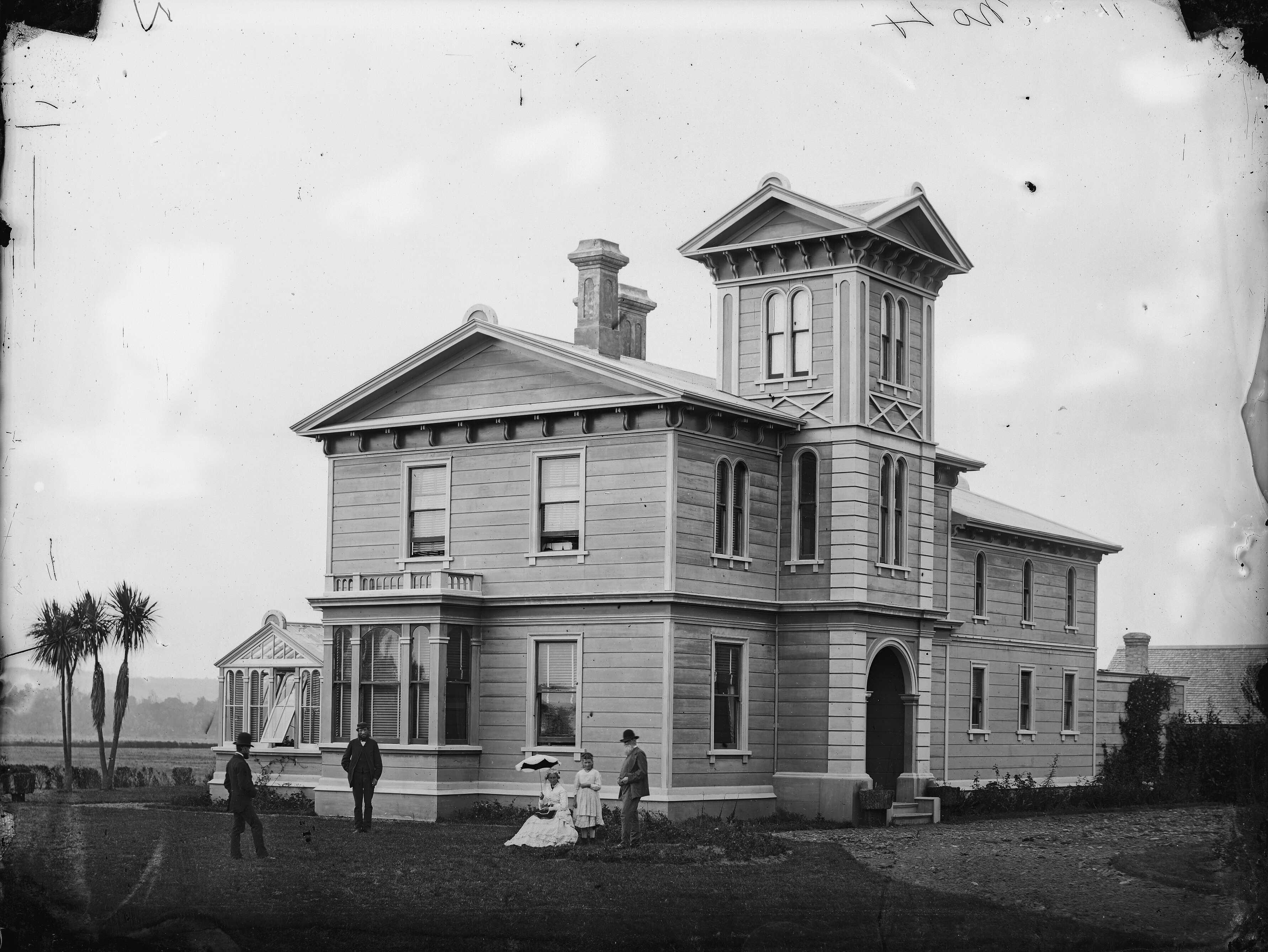
Westoe house was built for William Fox in 1874

He continued to undertake considerable physical exercise and, guided by Harry Peters, climbed Mount Taranaki in 1892, aged 80. He died in Auckland on 23 June 1893 aged 81. He was buried at Purewa Cemetery in the Auckland suburb of Meadowbank.

The town of Foxton, founded in 1885, was named after Sir William.

=== Westoe house ===
Fox bought 5,000 acres (2,000 ha) of the acquired Rangitikei block, near Greatford, about 1849. In 1868 an attempt to subdivide a township of Marsden failed because of a liquor ban. The current Westoe was designed by Charles Tringham and built for Fox in 1874 in Italianate style. It was sold in 1885 and was listed as a Category 1 Historic Place on 29 November 1985. The gardens include a cedar of Lebanon planted by Fox.

== Personality ==
Fox has been described as determined and intelligent, but also as bitter and "too fond" of personal attacks. Different aspects of his personality are emphasised by different accounts.

New Zealand Parliament
New constituency	Member of Parliament for Wanganui; 1855–1860; 1876–1879 (serving alongside John Bryce)	Succeeded by Henry Shafto Harrison
Preceded by Julius Vogel	Member of Parliament for Wanganui; 1855–1860; 1876–1879 (serving alongside John Bryce)	Succeeded by John Ballance
New constituency	Member of Parliament for Rangitikei; 1861–1865; 1868–1875; 1880–1881	Succeeded by Robert Pharazyn
Preceded by William Hogg Watt	Member of Parliament for Rangitikei; 1861–1865; 1868–1875; 1880–1881	Succeeded by John Ballance
Preceded by William Jarvis Willis	Member of Parliament for Rangitikei; 1861–1865; 1868–1875; 1880–1881	Succeeded by John Stevens
Government offices
Preceded by Henry Sewell	Premier of New Zealand; 1856; 1861–1862; 1868–1875; 1880–1881	Succeeded by Edward Stafford
Preceded by Edward Stafford	Premier of New Zealand; 1856; 1861–1862; 1868–1875; 1880–1881	Succeeded by Alfred Domett
Preceded by Edward Stafford	Premier of New Zealand; 1856; 1861–1862; 1868–1875; 1880–1881	Succeeded by Edward Stafford
Preceded by George Waterhouse	Premier of New Zealand; 1856; 1861–1862; 1868–1875; 1880–1881	Succeeded by Julius Vogel
Preceded by Frederick Whitaker	Attorney-General; 1856; 1861	Succeeded by Frederick Whitaker
Preceded by Frederick Whitaker	Attorney-General; 1856; 1861	Succeeded by Henry Sewell
