= 1883–1884 Atkinson ministry =

Former government of New Zealand

The third Atkinson ministry was a responsible government in New Zealand, sometimes referred to as part of the Continuous Ministry. It took office after the retirement of Frederick Whitaker and continued the personnel and policies of the Whitaker and Hall ministries.

== Background ==
Harry Atkinson, who had been Treasurer in the previous two ministries of John Hall and Frederick Whitaker, retained the entire outgoing Cabinet with the exception of the retiring Whitaker. Walter Johnston later left the ministry to return to his own private business and was replaced with Edwin Mitchelson.

This third Atkinson ministry lacked popular support due to its perceived parsimony and the limited number of public works projects it undertook. In June 1884 the government lost a no-confidence motion, but neither of the opposition leaders, William Montgomery and Sir George Grey, was able to put together a majority government in its place. Before calling an election, Atkinson announced a policy of 'closer settlement' of land, Crown pre-emption in purchases of Māori land, and encouragement of local industry through moderately protectionist tariffs.

At the 1884 general election, Sir Julius Vogel returned to New Zealand politics and led a party of followers into the House. As the factional arithmetic was unclear, Atkinson's ministry remained in power until the House met and Vogel was able to put together a coalition with Robert Stout.

== Ministers ==
The following members served in the Hall ministry:

Name	Portrait	Office	Term
Harry Atkinson		Premier	25 September 1883 – 16 August 1884
Harry Atkinson		Colonial Treasurer	8 October 1879 – 16 August 1884
Harry Atkinson		Commissioner of Stamp Duties	29 October 1879 – 16 August 1884
Harry Atkinson		Commissioner of Trade and Customs	21 April 1882 – 16 August 1884
William Rolleston		Minister of Lands	8 October 1879 – 16 August 1884
William Rolleston		Minister of Immigration	8 October 1879 – 16 August 1884
William Rolleston		Minister of Mines	15 December 1880 – 16 August 1884
John Bryce		Minister for Native Affairs	19 October 1881 – 16 August 1884
Thomas Dick		Colonial Secretary	5 March 1880 – 16 August 1884
Thomas Dick		Minister of Education	15 December 1880 – 16 August 1884
Walter Johnston		Minister for Public Works	21 April 1882 – 23 November 1883
Walter Johnston		Member of Executive Council	25 September 1883 – 4 June 1884
Edward Conolly		Minister of Justice	11 October 1882 – 16 August 1884
Edward Conolly		Attorney-General	25 September 1883 – 16 August 1884
Richard Oliver, MLC		Postmaster-General	25 September 1883 – 16 August 1884
Richard Oliver, MLC		Electric Telegraph Commissioner	25 September 1883 – 16 August 1884
Edwin Mitchelson		Minister for Public Works	23 November 1883 – 16 August 1884

== See also ==
- New Zealand Government
