= 1887–1891 Atkinson ministry =

Former government of New Zealand

Scarecrow Ministry
- Ministries of New Zealand
- 1887–1891
- Date formed: 8 October 1887
- Date dissolved: 24 January 1891

People and organisations
- Head of state: Victoria
- Head of government: Harry Atkinson
- Member party: Conservatives
- Opposition party: Liberal Party
- Opposition leader: John Ballance

History
- Election: 1887 general election
- Predecessor: 1884–1887 Stout–Vogel ministry
- Successor: First Liberal

The fifth Atkinson ministry (known as the Scarecrow Ministry) was a responsible government in New Zealand, serving from October 1887 to January 1891. It was the last non-party government of New Zealand. It was also the final component of the "Continuous Ministry", a series of conservative governments between 1876 and 1891.

== Background ==
The House of Representatives was split between several different factions after the 1887 general election. The Opposition to the Stout-Vogel government had been led by John Bryce, but he lost his seat at this election and the leadership of his grouping passed back to ex-Premier Harry Atkinson, who now became Premier. The Atkinson ministry tended to govern with the support of free-trader rural conservatives as a means of keeping John Ballance out of power. Their policy was to retrench public spending and raise taxes to make the budget balance during the long depression of the 1880s, while also promoting growth with a small loan for public works expenditure, along with promotion of local industry and closer settlement of the land. To do this, the Atkinson ministry favoured "modest protectionism" and the legalisation of direct purchase of Māori land without the purchasers going through the Crown as an intermediary.

The free-traders objected to Atkinson's proposed tariff of 1888, which ended up passing with the support of the followers of John Ballance and Sir George Grey, later to sweep the Atkinsonites out of power as the new Liberal Party. Other policies of this government which offended its conservative supporters included bills to establish fair rents, an eight-hour working day and minimum wages for working men, and to abolish plural voting. Only the last of these was passed. This was a time of mounting labour unrest, typified by the international maritime strike of 1890, during which the government paid the rail fares of the union negotiators.

Despite lasting for several years, the government was generally regarded as a weak and disunified one, bringing together ministers like George Fisher, who disagreed with the Premier on education funding – when he resigned, he submitted "a 60-page document outlining his concerns with the Government administration". Another minister, Thomas Hislop, had described Atkinson as "communistic" at an election meeting and was later sacked for using his ministerial position to aid the business affairs of his personal friends. For the 1890 session of Parliament, Atkinson was too ill to speak, and he died in 1892 – he repeatedly offered his resignation to Cabinet, but they rejected it on the grounds that no other leader could hope to command a stable majority.

At the 1890 general election, the government was defeated at the polls by the Liberal Party; however, it was not clear initially whether the Liberals had a majority, so Atkinson remained Premier until the House met in early 1891. Some supporters advised the government to create a batch of Legislative Councillors when they resigned in order to block Liberal policies – however, the Governor only agreed to appoint six, and later made more for the new Liberal Government.

== Ministers ==
The following members served in the fifth Atkinson ministry:

Name	Portrait	Office	Term
Harry Atkinson		Premier	8 October 1887 – 24 January 1891
Harry Atkinson		Colonial Treasurer	8 October 1887 – 24 January 1891
Harry Atkinson		Minister of Marine	8 October 1887 – 24 January 1891
Harry Atkinson		Commissioner of Stamps	8 October 1887 – 24 January 1891
Harry Atkinson		Postmaster-General	8 October 1887 – 17 October 1889
Harry Atkinson		Commissioner of Telegraphs	8 October 1887 – 17 October 1889
Harry Atkinson		Minister of Education	8 April 1889 – 9 July 1889
Harry Atkinson		Commissioner of Trade and Customs	8 April 1889 – 24 January 1891
Thomas William Hislop		Colonial Secretary	8 October 1887 – 10 September 1889
Thomas William Hislop		Minister of Education	9 July 1889 – 10 September 1889
Thomas William Hislop		Minister of Education	17 October 1889 – 24 January 1891
Thomas Fergus		Minister of Justice	8 October 1887 – 17 October 1889
Thomas Fergus		Minister of Defence	8 October 1887 = 17 October 1889
Thomas Fergus		Minister of Public Works	17 October 1889 – 24 January 1891
Thomas Fergus		Minister of Mines	17 October 1889 – 24 January 1891
George Fisher		Minister of Education	8 October 1887 – 8 April 1889
George Fisher		Commissioner of Trade and Customs	8 October 1887 – 8 April 1889
George Richardson		Minister of Lands	8 October 1887 – 24 January 1891
George Richardson		Minister of Immigration	8 October 1887 – 24 January 1891
George Richardson		Minister of Mines	8 October 1887 – 17 October 1889
George Richardson		Minister of Agriculture	17 October 1889 – 24 January 1891
Sir Frederick Whitaker, MLC		Attorney-General	11 October 1887 – 24 January 1891
Edwin Mitchelson		Minister for Public Works	11 October 1887 – 17 October 1889
Edwin Mitchelson		Minister for Native Affairs	11 October 1887 – 24 January 1891
Edwin Mitchelson		Postmaster-General and Commissioner of Telegraphs	17 October 1889 – 24 January 1891
Edward Cephas John Stevens, MLC		Member of Executive Council	11 October 1887 – 24 January 1891
William Russell		Colonial Secretary	17 October 1889 – 24 January 1891
William Russell		Minister of Defence	17 October 1889 – 24 January 1891
William Russell		Minister Justice	17 October 1889 – 24 January 1891

== See also ==
- New Zealand Government
