= 1884–1887 Stout–Vogel ministry =

New Zealand political ministry

Stout–Vogel Ministry
- ministries of New Zealand
- 1884–1887
- Date formed: 3 September 1884
- Date dissolved: 8 October 1887

People and organisations
- Head of state: Victoria
- Head of government: Robert Stout
- Deputy head of government: Julius Vogel
- Member party: Stout–Vogelites
- Opposition party: Conservatives
- Opposition leader: Harry Atkinson

History
- Election: 1884 general election
- Predecessor: 1884 Atkinson Ministry
- Successor: 1887–1891 Atkinson Ministry

The Second Stout–Vogel Ministry was a responsible government in New Zealand that was formed in September 1884 and governed until October 1887. From the outset, Robert Stout served as Prime Minister as well as Attorney-General whilst Julius Vogel held the post of Minister of Finance.

This ministry entered power less than a week after the short-lived First Stout–Vogel Ministry fell. It had lasted only a fortnight, with James William Thomson moving a vote of no confidence against Stout; Harry Atkinson then formed his fourth ministry. However, Atkinson also failed to win the confidence of parliament, and Stout and Vogel supplanted him and remained in power for the next three years.

== Background ==
Vogel had the larger following in the coalition, but his poor health caused him to yield the premiership to Stout. Regardless, many observers still saw Vogel as the more dominant partner in the alliance. Both men were highly active in building consensus between the growing labour movement and middle-class liberalism. Both leaders were likeminded on social policy, however frequently clashed over financial policy.

At the time the ministry was formed, New Zealand was in a prolonged economic recession. As Treasurer, Vogel did what he could to promote recovery, including borrowing, though with little success. The initially hopeful populace lost faith that the government could restore economic prosperity, viewing that retrenchment was the only solution, not expansionism. Atkinson passed another motion of no confidence against the government on 28 May 1887. Stout was granted a dissolution, but the subsequent election went against the Ministry and Stout himself suffered the indignity of losing his own seat.

== Ministers ==
The following members served in the reconstructed Stout–Vogel Ministry:

Name	Image	Office	Term
Sir Robert Stout		Prime Minister	3 September 1884 – 8 October 1887
Sir Robert Stout		Attorney-General	3 September 1884 – 8 October 1887
Sir Robert Stout		Minister of Education	8 January 1885 – 8 October 1887
Sir Julius Vogel		Minister of Finance	3 September 1884 – 8 October 1887
Sir Julius Vogel		Postmaster-General	3 September 1884 – 8 October 1887
Sir Julius Vogel		Commissioner of Trade and Customs	3 September 1884 – 8 October 1887
Sir Julius Vogel		Commissioner of Telegraphs	3 September 1884 – 8 October 1887
Sir Julius Vogel		Commissioner of Stamp Duties	3 September 1884 – 8 October 1887
Edward Richardson, MLC		Minister of Public Works	3 September 1884 – 8 October 1887
John Ballance		Minister of Native Affairs	3 September 1884 – 8 October 1887
John Ballance		Minister of Defence	3 September 1884 – 8 October 1887
John Ballance		Minister of Lands	3 September 1884 – 8 October 1887
John Ballance		Minister of Immigration	3 September 1884 – 8 October 1887
Joseph Tole		Minister of Justice	3 September 1884 – 8 October 1887
Patrick Buckley, MLC		Colonial Secretary	3 September 1884 – 8 October 1887
William Reynolds		Member of Executive Council	3 September 1884 – 3 January 1885
William Reynolds		Member of Executive Council	3 June 1886 – 8 October 1887
William Larnach		Minister of Mines	5 January 1885 – 8 October 1887
William Larnach		Minister of Marine	5 January 1885 – 8 October 1887

== See also ==
- List of New Zealand governments
