= 1879–1882 Hall ministry =

Former government of New Zealand

The Hall ministry was a responsible government in New Zealand, sometimes referred to as part of the Continuous Ministry. It took office after defeating Sir George Grey's supporters (many of whom would subsequently form the Liberal Party) in a confidence motion, and is usually regarded as a conservative ministry, although Hall himself described his followers as "the independent Liberal party".

== Background ==
Sir William Fox acted as leader of the opposition to Grey and moved a no-confidence motion against him which precipitated the 1879 general election; however, Fox lost his seat in that election, leaving Hall in charge by default. Hall moved his own confidence motion when the House met, and won by two votes on account of the government's "extravagance" on the civil service and a new £5 million loan. Almost immediately, the Hall ministry was challenged when James Macandrew and others returned to Grey's party and moved a fresh confidence motion against Hall. However, the new ministry survived by signing a formal deal with the so-called 'Auckland Rats', who shifted to support Hall in return for a promise to maintain public works spending in the North Island. Contemporaries argued that "it was fear of Grey alone" which prevented wavering members from voting down the Hall government.

The ministry's main goal was retrenchment amid the long economic depression of the 1880s: Treasurer Harry Atkinson introduced a property tax and increased customs duties while reducing public spending on elements of the Public Works programme such as government-assisted passages for male immigrants. Rather than continue with big infrastructure projects, Hall's ministry focused on smaller projects spread throughout the country as a means of attracting the support of the widest possible number of members, and then attempted to de-politicise railway construction by creating a separate Board of Public Works. Atkisnon was able to announce a budget surplus in 1881.

Although Hall preferred to govern by means of Cabinet consensus, the ministry was divided on Māori policy. Henare Tomoana, appointed Minister without portfolio representing the Native Race, understood that he was to have greater influence over this, and was disappointed by Native Minister John Bryce's announcement of his own policy. He resigned after being in office for a fortnight. Bryce favoured the forcible confiscation of Taranaki land occupied by Te Whiti, and was forced to resign in William Rolleston's favour when he did not obtain the backing of Cabinet on this aggressive approach. Rolleston, however, was unable to convince Te Whiti to accept his proposed Native Reserves, and Bryce was brought back to lead the armed march on Te Whiti's passive-resister community at Parihaka.

Reforms passed by this ministry included the Triennial Parliaments Act and the introduction of universal manhood suffrage. However, in April 1882 Hall resigned on the advice of his doctors, advising Governor Gordon to call Whitaker to continue the government. However, as Hall was at that moment in conflict with Bryce, Gordon instead attempted to call Sir George Grey back to office and had to be reminded that Hall's supporters still had a parliamentary majority.

== Ministers ==
The following members served in the Hall ministry:

Name	Portrait	Office	Term
John Hall		Premier	8 October 1879 – 21 April 1882
John Hall		Colonial Secretary	8 October 1879 – 5 March 1880
John Hall		Postmaster-General	22 December 1879 – 9 March 1881
John Hall		Commissioner of Telegraphs	22 December 1879 – 9 March 1881
John Hall		Commissioner of Customs	10 March 1881 – 21 April 1882
Frederick Whitaker, MLC		Attorney-General	8 October 1879 – 25 September 1883
Harry Atkinson		Colonial Treasurer	8 October 1879 – 16 August 1884
Harry Atkinson		Commissioner of Customs	8 October 1879 – 10 March 1881
Harry Atkinson		Commissioner of Stamp Duties	8 October 1879 – 16 August 1884
William Rolleston		Minister of Lands and Immigration	8 October 1879 – 16 August 1884
William Rolleston		Minister of Education	8 October 1879 – 15 December 1880
William Rolleston		Minister of Justice	15 December 1880 – 23 April 1881
William Rolleston		Minister of Mines	15 December 1880 – 16 August 1884
William Rolleston		Minister for Native Affairs	4 February 1881 – 19 October 1881
Richard Oliver		Minister for Public Works	8 October 1879 – 31 May 1881
Richard Oliver		Member of Executive Council	8 October 1881 – 21 April 1882
John Bryce		Minister for Native Affairs	8 October 1879 – 21 January 1881
John Bryce		Minister for Native Affairs and Defence Minister	19 October 1881 – 16 August 1884
Henare Tomoana		Member of Executive Council	8 October 1881 – 25 October 1881
Thomas Dick		Colonial Secretary	5 March 1880 – 16 August 1884
Thomas Dick		Minister of Education	15 December 1880 – 16 August 1884
Thomas Dick		Minister of Justice	23 April 1881 – 11 October 1882
Walter Johnston		Postmaster-General	9 March 1881 – 11 October 1882
Walter Johnston		Commissioner of Telegraphs	9 March 1881 – 11 October 1882

== See also ==
- New Zealand Government
