= 1876–1877 Atkinson ministry =

Former government of New Zealand

The first and second Atkinson ministries were responsible governments in a period sometimes known as the Continuous Ministry. Harry Atkinson formed a government on 1 September 1876, but as it included nine salaried ministers rather than the legally mandated eight, the ministry was forced to resign on 13 September and take office again without John Hall. This second Atkinson ministry survived a full year.

== Background ==
Atkinson took over from the government of Julius Vogel, who recommended him to the governor on condition that Atkinson appoint him Agent-General in London. Vogel had already sounded out John Davies Ormond, Edward Stafford and William Fitzherbert. Within a fortnight of the installation of the new ministry (which kept on several figures from the previous administrations), it was forced to resign as the budget only provided for seven ministers plus a premier, and Atkinson had appointed eight. The first Atkinson ministry handed in their resignations on 13 September 1876 and were immediately reappointed with the exception of John Hall, thus becoming officially the second Atkinson ministry.

Vogel's Great Public Works policy had run into criticism of the lack of parliamentary oversight of public works contracts and a public debt which had grown from £8 million to £17 million between 1870 and 1875, while export prices were dropping. The ministry therefore reversed the previous policy and cut back on public works spending except for main trunk lines, which had the impact of losing the votes of land speculators and backblocks members. To deal with the number of unemployed immigrants unable to afford the inflated price of land, the government introduced a Waste Lands Act including the ability to purchase land on deferred payment. This was one of the few new policies brought in by a government whose mission was "political rest combined with financial circumspection".

One of the alienated members of the House of Representatives was William Larnach, who in October 1877 submitted a motion of no confidence based on the ministry's paralysis. It has been argued that he was in fact motivated by a desire for a government which would promote his speculative Waimea Plains Land Company. Larnach's motion succeeded by 42 votes to 38 but Larnach was unable to form a new ministry, instead recommending that ex-governor Sir George Grey be called.

== Ministers ==
The following members served in the Atkinson ministry:

Name	Portrait	Office	Term
Harry Atkinson		Premier	1 September 1876 – 13 October 1877
Harry Atkinson		Colonial Treasurer	1 September 1876 – 13 October 1877
Harry Atkinson		Secretary of Crown Lands	13 September 1876 – 4 January 1877
Harry Atkinson		Minister for Immigration	13 September 1876 – 4 January 1877
Daniel Pollen, MLC		Colonial Secretary	4 July 1873 – 13 October 1877
Daniel Pollen, MLC		Native Minister	18 December 1876 – 13 October 1877
Frederick Whitaker		Attorney-General	1 September 1876 – 13 September 1876
Frederick Whitaker		Attorney-General	4 November 1876 – 13 October 1877
Frederick Whitaker		Postmaster-General	13 September 1876 – 7 December 1876
Frederick Whitaker		Commissioner of Telegraphs	13 September 1876 – 7 December 1876
Sir Donald McLean		Native Minister	11 October 1872 – 7 December 1876
John Hall, MLC		Member of Executive Council	1 September 1876 – 13 September 1876
Edward Richardson		Minister for Public Works	29 October 1872 – 4 January 1877
Charles Bowen		Minister of Justice	16 December 1874 – 13 October 1877
Charles Bowen		Commissioner of Stamp Duties	16 December 1874 – 13 October 1877
George McLean		Commissioner of Customs	4 July 1876 – 13 October 1877
George McLean		Postmaster-General	1 September 1876 – 13 September 1876
George McLean		Postmaster-General	12 January 1877 – 13 October 1877
George McLean		Commissioner of Telegraphs	1 September 1876 – 13 September 1876
George McLean		Commissioner of Telegraphs	12 January 1877 – 13 October 1877
John Davies Ormond		Secretary of Crown Lands	1 September 1876 – 13 September 1876
John Davies Ormond		Minister for Immigration	1 September 1876 – 13 September 1876
John Davies Ormond		Postmaster-General	7 December 1876 – 12 January 1877
John Davies Ormond		Commissioner of Telegraphs	7 December 1876 – 12 January 1877
John Davies Ormond		Minister for Public Works	8 January 1877 – 13 October 1877
Hori Tawhiti		Member of Executive Council	28 November 1876 – 13 October 1877
Donald Reid		Secretary of Crown Lands	4 January 1877 – 13 October 1877
Donald Reid		Minister for Immigration	4 January 1877 – 13 October 1877

== See also ==
- New Zealand Government
