= 1877–1879 Grey ministry =

New Zealand 1877–1879 responsible government

Grey Ministry
- ministries of New Zealand
- 1877–1879
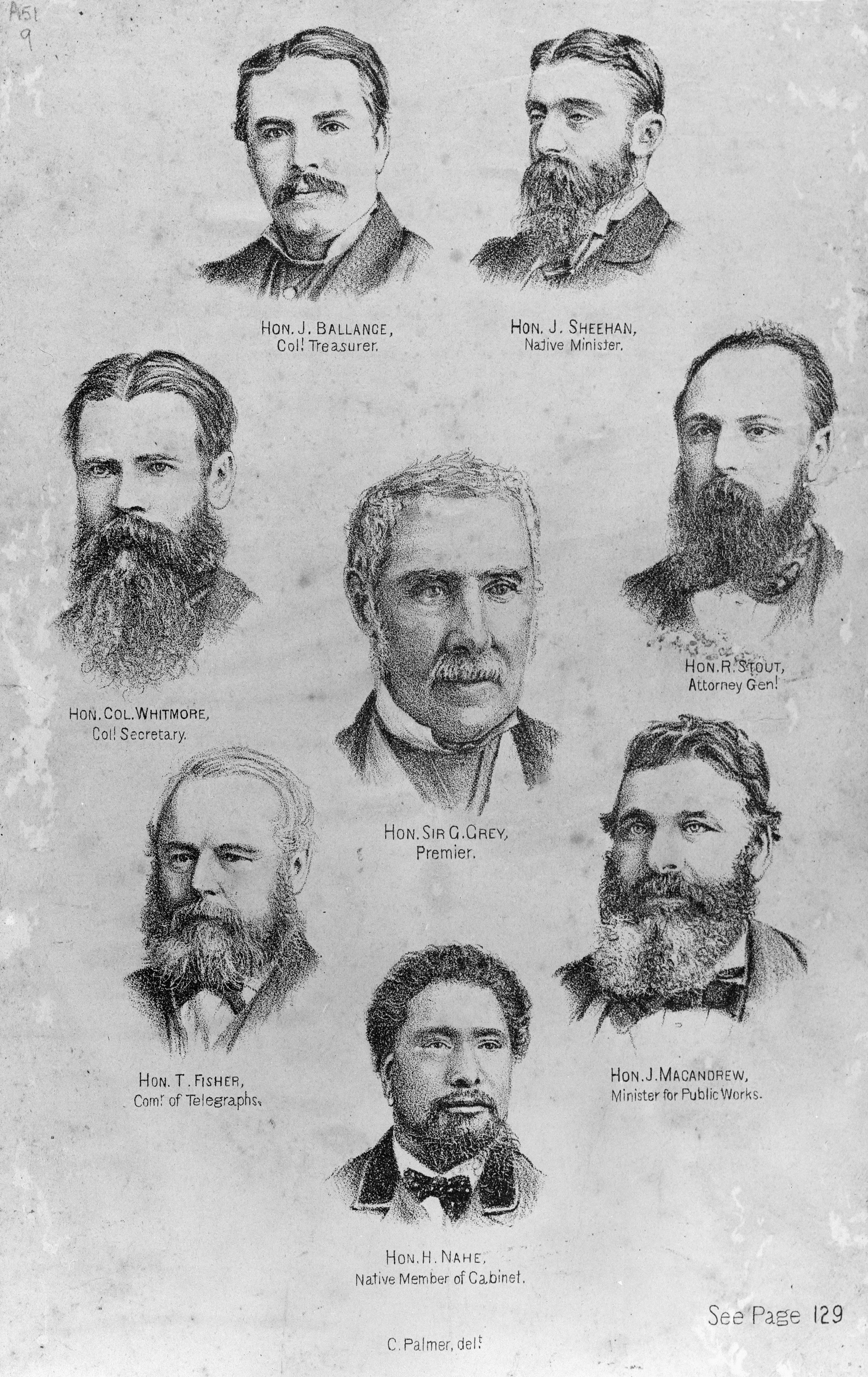
- Date formed: 13 October 1877
- Date dissolved: 8 October 1879

People and organisations
- Head of state: Victoria
- Head of government: George Grey
- Member party: Greyites
- Opposition party: Conservatives
- Opposition leader: Harry Atkinson John Hall

History
- Election: 1875-1876 general election
- Predecessor: Atkinson Ministry, 1876–1877
- Successor: Hall Ministry, 1879–1882

The Grey Ministry was a responsible government that was formed in New Zealand. It formed in October 1877 and governed for two years until October 1879. From the outset, Sir George Grey served as Prime Minister.

== Background ==
As Premier, Grey was highly active in promoting middle-class liberalism to New Zealanders sponsoring ideas such as electoral reform, land taxes, breaking up large estates, regulation of wages and working hours and accessible education. However his ideas were too radical for many of his contemporaries. Grey's administration was perceived as defective and his leadership poor. As he never had a safe majority in Parliament, Grey unsuccessfully asked for a dissolution in 1878. Soon after the economy began to slide into recession, which caused much unemployment and as a result, unpopularity. The next year Grey's government lost a division in the House triggering an election. Grey and his followers failed to win a majority and in October 1879 Grey resigned.

== Ministers ==
The following members served in the Grey Ministry:

Name	Image	Office	Term
Sir George Grey		Prime Minister	15 October 1877 – 8 October 1879
Sir George Grey		Colonial Secretary	15 October 1877 – 18 October 1877
Sir George Grey		Minister of Customs	15 October 1877 – 12 January 1878
Sir George Grey		Minister of Customs	12 July 1878 – 8 October 1879
Sir George Grey		Minister of Marine	9 April 1878 – 8 October 1879
Sir George Grey		Minister of Finance	13 July 1879 – 8 October 1879
William Larnach		Minister of Finance	15 October 1877 – 5 March 1878
William Larnach		Minister of Public Works	15 October 1877 – 5 March 1878
James Macandrew		Minister of Lands	15 October 1877 – 25 July 1878
James Macandrew		Minister of Immigration	15 October 1877 – 25 July 1878
James Macandrew		Minister of Public Works	28 March 1878 – 8 October 1879
John Sheehan		Minister of Native Affairs	13 October 1877 – 8 October 1879
John Sheehan		Minister of Justice	13 October 1877 – 8 October 1879
James Temple Fisher		Postmaster-General	13 October 1877 – 8 October 1879
George Stoddart Whitmore		Colonial Secretary	18 October 1877 – 8 October 1879
John Ballance		Minister of Education	12 January 1878 – 1 July 1879
John Ballance		Minister of Finance	12 January 1878 – 1 July 1879
Robert Stout		Attorney-General	13 March 1878 – 25 June 1879
Robert Stout		Minister of Lands	13 March 1878 – 25 June 1879
Hoani Nahe		Member of Executive Council	17 November 1877 – 8 October 1879
John Nathanial Wilson		Member of Executive Council	2 November 1878 – 8 October 1879
William Swanson		Member of Executive Council	17 April 1879 – 15 July 1879
William Gisborne		Minister of Lands	5 July 1879 – 15 July 1879
William Gisborne		Minister of Mines	5 July 1879 – 8 October 1879
William Gisborne		Minister of Immigration	5 July 1879 – 8 October 1879
James William Thomson		Member of Executive Council	15 July 1879 – 8 October 1879
James William Thomson		Minister of Lands	16 July 1879 – 8 October 1879

== See also ==
List of New Zealand governments
