= Liberal Government of New Zealand =

First responsible government, 1891–1912

The Liberal Government
- Ministry of New Zealand
- 1891–1912
- Date formed: 24 January 1891
- Date dissolved: 10 July 1912

People and organisations
- Monarch: Victoria; Edward VII; George V
- Governor: The Earl of Onslow (1889–1892); The Earl of Glasgow (1892–1897); The Earl of Ranfurly (1897–1904); The Lord Plunket (1904–1910); The Lord Islington (1910–1912)
- Premier Prime Minister (from 1901): John Ballance; Richard Seddon; William Hall-Jones; Joseph Ward; Thomas Mackenzie
- Member party: Liberal Party
- Opposition party: Conservatives (Note: The opposition recast itself numerous times from the Political Reform Association (1887–1891), National Association (1891–1899), and finally as the New Zealand Political Reform League in 1909.); Reform Party
- Opposition leader: John Bryce (1891); William Rolleston (1891–1893); William Russell (1894–1901); Vacant (1901–1903); William Massey (1903–1912)

History
- Elections: 1890 general election; 1893 general election; 1896 general election; 1899 general election; 1902 general election; 1905 general election; 1908 general election; 1911 general election
- Legislature terms: 11th Parliament; 12th Parliament; 13th Parliament; 14th Parliament; 15th Parliament; 16th Parliament; 17th Parliament
- Predecessor: Continuous Ministry
- Successor: Reform Government

The Liberal Government of New Zealand was the first responsible government in New Zealand politics organised along party lines. The government formed following the founding of the Liberal Party and took office on 24 January 1891, and governed New Zealand for over 21 years until 10 July 1912. To date, it is the longest-serving government in New Zealand's history. The government was also historically notable for enacting significant social and economic changes, such as the Old Age Pensions Act and women's suffrage. One historian described the policies of the government as "a revolution in the relationship between the government and the people".

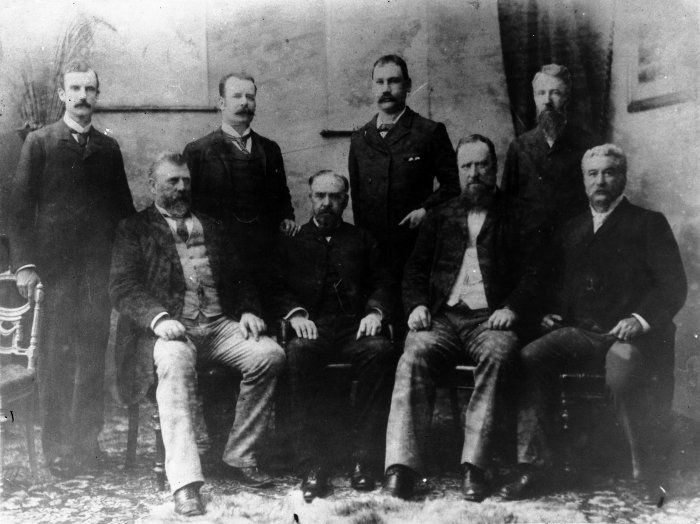
The Ballance Ministry, 1892

== Significant policies ==
=== Economic ===
- The Industrial Conciliation and Arbitration Act 1894 established a conciliation and compulsory arbitration system with the aim of providing the unions with the means of protecting their members. The act encouraged the growth of unions by limiting labour representation at the arbitration court to registered unions. The act also gave the arbitration court the authority to fix conditions of employment which included (as noted by one study) "fixing the minimum rates of wages to be paid in the cases coming before it.”
- Legislation was introduced to protect vulnerable groups, such as the gumdiggers, miners, shop assistants, shearers, and servants.
- The Department of Labour was established in 1891 to ensure that improvements in working conditions took place to inspect shearing sheds, shops, factories, and generally to examine working conditions. The new department helped to reduce unemployment by transporting labourers to jobs, and assisted more than 90,000 men and their dependents find a family income over the course of the next decade.
- Factory hours and working conditions were strictly regulated and children were removed from factories. The Factory Act 1891 gave legal definition to a factory. The Factory Act 1894 required registration and inspection of factories, specified maximum hours of work for women and young persons, and prevented those under the age of fourteen being employed in factories. By 1896, 4,600 factories with 31,000 workers and a further 7,000 shop assistants were registered with the Department of Labour.
- In 1894, an act aimed at preventing sweating was passed.
- The Shop-Assistants Act 1892 dealt with sanitation and inspection. It also introduced a compulsory half-holiday for retail workers.
- The Wages Protection Bill (1898) was designed to protect workers' wage packets from arbitrary deductions by employers.
- The New Zealand Accident Insurance Act 1899 provided the commissioner of life insurance with the powers to insure people against accidents, and could also insure employers from liability for accidents to any of their employees.
- The Shipping and Seamen's Act 1894 specified minimum crews and safety conditions for shipping.
- An act of 1896 provided, as noted by one study, “that no factory work could be carried on in premises where a person resided who suffered from an infectious disease.”
- The public service was significantly expanded between 1891 and 1911. By 1912, more than 40,000 people were on the state's payroll, compared to roughly 10,000 in 1890.
- The Factories Act of 1901 regulated the working hours of men while providing for payment of overtime.
- The Coal Mines Act 1901 established state mines to compete directly with privately owned mines.
- The Fires Brigades Act 1906 increased subsidies for volunteer fire brigades.
- Public works schemes such as road construction were encouraged and helped to reduce unemployment.
- A land and income tax bill was passed which introduced direct taxation as well as a graduated land tax. The bill also repealed the former inequitable property tax.
- A significant industrial expansion took place, such as in the metal trades, in printing, in the clothing and processing industries, and in new industries such as electrical supply, fibrous-plaster works, and wire-marking.
- A state fire insurance office and state coal mines with their own sale depots were established.
- The Truck Act 1891 forced all employers to pay in cash instead of goods.
- The Coal Mines Act (1891) authorised the government to purchase two West Coast mines.
- The Employers' Liability Amendment Act enabled workers to recover damages for injuries received from either faulty equipment or negligence on the part of the employer, and also outlawed any arrangement whereby a worker agreed not to claim for any damages.
- The Contractors' and Workmen's Liens Act of 1892 protected the rights of workers and contractors for payment for work done.
- Forty-eight hours a week was established by law as the normal working time for men in factories (1901).
- The Servants’ Registry Offices Act of 1895 regulated (as noted by one study) “the licensing of registry offices for domestic or farm servants.”
- The Wages Attachment Act of 1895 prevented wages below a certain amount from being attached for debt.
- The Employment of Boys or Girls without Payment Prevention Act of 1899 set minimum rates of pays for boys and girls.
- Women and young people in employment were limited to a 45-hour workweek (1901).
- A law relating to shipping and seamen was passed which improved the safety and protection of those working on ships and provided for specified skilled officers and for the care of seamen taken ill.
- The Workers' Compensation for Accidents Act 1900 extended employers' liability for accidents to workers to cover "all injuries arising out of, and in the course of, employment".
- An accident branch of the Government Insurance Department was established (1901) to provide insurance facilities for employers for risk of injury. Under the act, certain diseases were classified as accidents (such as mercury poisoning, lead poisoning, and anthrax), and thus injury relating to a person's line of work "became recognised as a proper charge on industry".
- The Workmen's Wages Act of 1898 required the wages of manual workers to be paid at least on a weekly basis, while also strengthening the protection of wage payments due under contracts.
- Provision of compensation for work-related injuries was introduced.
- In 1898, an amendment was made authorizing courts of arbitration (as noted by one study) “to prescribe minimum wages in its awards and to make special provision for lower rates to be paid to workers who were unable to earn the minimum.”
- The Shipping and Seamen's Amendment Act stipulated the proportion of trained shipmen on a ship.
- The Shop and Shop-assistants Act enforced weekend holidays.
- A factories act stipulated maximum working hours for women and children, while forbidding the employment of children under the age of fourteen.
- The Factories Act 1894 provided for the registration and inspection of factories and closely regulated the employment of women and children.
- A plan for unemployed workers to clear and then lease landholdings was sponsored.
- A women's employment bureau established (1895).
- The government won the right to repurchase private land for development, with its Land for Settlements Act 1892, which was supported by a graduated land tax under the Land and Income Assessment Act 1891.
- A bureau of industries was established (1891) to help place people in jobs. The bureau provided male New Zealanders with employment on special relief works and also gave free railway passes to unemployed men to enable them to go to areas where jobs were available.
- Labour Day was made a public holiday (1899).
- Legislation was introduced to "facilitate and control insurance against industrial accidents."
- A commercial trusts act (1910) was introduced to suppress monopolies.
- The Scaffolding Inspection Act 1906 required notification of intention to erect any structure or framework over 16 ft in height, or any swinging stage, "for the support of workmen engaged on building work". The legislation also provided for the appointment of inspectors with rights of entry and inspection, and allowed regulations to be made laying down minimum safety requirements.
- In 1911, authority was bestowed upon arbitration courts (as noted by one study) “to convert agreements between the parties into official awards.”

=== Health ===
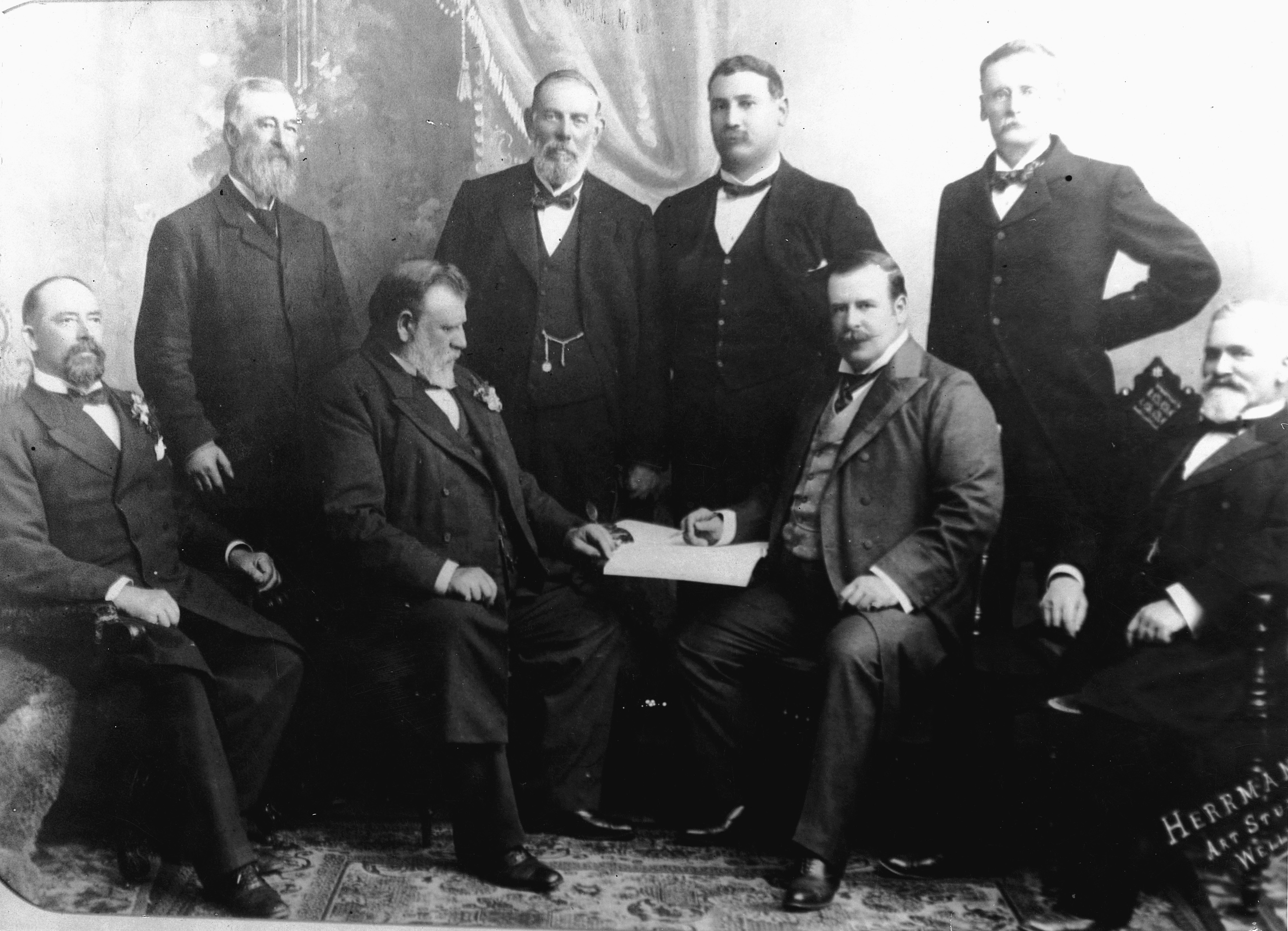
The Seddon Ministry, 1900.

- Public Health Act 1901 founded the Department of Public Health in 1901.
- The Nurses' Registration Act 1901 provided for a course of three years' training and a state examination followed by registration.
- The Midwives' Act 1904 was passed with the aims of regulating midwifery through a midwives' register, providing better training of midwives, and reducing maternal and infant mortality amongst working-class mothers. The legislation also encouraged the construction of state maternity hospitals.
- Steps were taken to teach oral hygiene in schools following a plea by dentists to the government in 1905.
- Subsidies on a pound for pound basis were made available to local authorities for water purification and sanitation.
- A rudimentary district nursing system was set up in areas with a high Maori population.
- Maori medical services came to be co-ordinated under the auspices of the Department of public Health.
- The Hospital and Charitable Institutions Act 1909 established 36 hospital districts, each with an elected hospital board.
- A department of health was set up, which initially concentrated on providing better sanitation, clean water, and sewage disposal, and dealt with quarantine matters.
- Vaccination against several diseases was promoted.
- The Pharmacy Board worked on a set of regulations (in 1911) governing the labelling of food and drugs, and the protection of meat and milk products. They were gazetted in 1913 under the Sale of Food and drugs Act of 1907.
- The Juvenile Suppression Act (1903) introduced penalties for supplying tobacco to youths or for youths who smoked.
- A system of medical inspections of children before they passed out of primary school was initiated.
- The Opium Prohibition Amendment Act 1902 introduced harsher penalties for the import of opium for smoking.
- Hospitals were constructed for working-class mothers (1905).
- A department of tourist and health resorts was established (1901). It was the first government-sponsored tourism organisation in the world.

=== Welfare ===
- The Old-age Pensions Act 1898 established a system of old-age pensions. Pensions were later introduced for widows (1911), Māori War veterans (1912), miners (1915), and the blind (1924).
- An Act of September 1891 established a relief fund for miners and their families.
- The Defence Act of 1909 eliminated (as noted by one observer) “the differential lower rates for Maoris which had previously applied.”
- In 1911, miners suffering from pneumoconiosis began receiving payments from a small relief fund set up by the government the previous year.
- The Military Pensions Act 1911 introduced payments for veterans of the Māori War of the 1860s.
- A variety of superannuation schemes for government workers were introduced. Starting with the Civil Service Insurance Act 1893, special schemes for railway and post office workers were introduced. In 1908, a comprehensive retirement scheme for all remaining state employees was established.
- The National Provident Fund Act 1910 encouraged the provision of annuities in old age. It also made special provision "for the support of dependent children by providing for the payment, on the death of a contributor, of a weekly allowance to the widow so long as any child is under 14 years of age, due after contributing for five years". Referred to as a "government friendly society", provided maternity medical expenses, sickness and death benefits, and a weekly pension at sixty which varied according to the level of contributions.
- In 1900, the New Zealand Forces that served in South Africa were (as one study has noted) “deemed to be Colonial Forces for pension purposes.”
- Child welfare was given greater attention, as demonstrated by the passing of legislation raising the age of consent (1896), better protection for the homeless (1896), the prohibition of children from smoking (1903), and attempts to create effective legal structures for dealing with juveniles (1906).
- Protection for women in inheritance cases was introduced and deserting husbands were made to provide maintenance under the Testators' Family Maintenance Act 1900.
- The Workers Dwellings Act 1905 encouraged the construction of 648 houses by 1919.
- The Shearers' Accommodation Act 1898 improved living conditions for shearers by requiring that all accommodation and other sheds had to be inspected, and that proper sleeping and eating areas had to be provided.
- The money lent under the Advances to Workers Act 1906 led to the construction of 9,675 houses by 1919. By 1913, nearly 9,000 government housing loans had been extended by the government.
- Amendments to the Destitute Persons Laws in 1894, 1908 and 1910 extended rights to maintenance.
- The Testators' Family Maintenance Act 1900 helped to protect the economic rights of wives and children.
- A lease-in-perpetuity (999-year lease) was introduced (1892) to provide security for settlers who could not afford to purchase freehold land.
- Credit for land purchase and improvements was provided.
- Subletting of government contracts for public works was abolished.
- The Lands for Settlements Act opened up crown land for leasing. In 1894, it was amended to force owners of large estates to sell portions of their holdings.
- The Government Advances to Settlers Act 1894 significantly expanded the supply of credit available to farmers. It enabled farmers to borrow from the state upon security at reasonable interest rates.
- A department of agriculture was established.
- The lease-in-perpetuity was abolished to benefit freeholders. In its place, short renewable leases with periodic revaluations were introduced, and tenants were provided with the right to purchase their land outright at its current value.
- The old age pension was increased (1905) to compensate pensioners for an increase in the cost of living.
- Means testing of pensions was liberalised (1910). In 1905, £150 of the value of a property was not counted in the reduction of the pension allowable, an amount that was increased to £340 in 1910.
- The repeal of the property tax exempted more than half of all small farmers from paying tax.
- Cash payments were introduced for a man aged sixty and above and a woman aged fifty-five and above if he or she had two or more children under the age of fourteen (1911).
- The Adoption of Children Act 1895 introduced a process whereby any person in New Zealand could place an adoption order.
- The Destitute Persons Act 1910 made provision for illegitimate children and deserted wives and children. This legislation introduced the concept of attachment orders on wages, and was aimed at relieving destitution rather providing adequate long-term support.
- The Legitimation Act 1904 made provision for the registration of the birth of any child born out of wedlock where the parents had subsequently married. In cases such as these, the father of the child had to register the birth and make a declaration that at the time of the birth there was no legal impediment to his marriage to the mother.
- A national pension scheme for teachers was introduced (1905).
- The Infant Life Protection Act 1893 required that all homes "that received payment for looking after infants under the age of two for more than three consecutive days had to be licensed as foster homes and were subject to police inspection". This legislation was followed by another act in 1896, which extended police powers of inspection and raised the upper age limit to four years.
- The Infant Life Protection Act 1907 required a doctor or midwife in attendance at the birth of an infant to notify the local registrar of the birth and a parent or his or her agent to complete the register entry.

=== Education ===
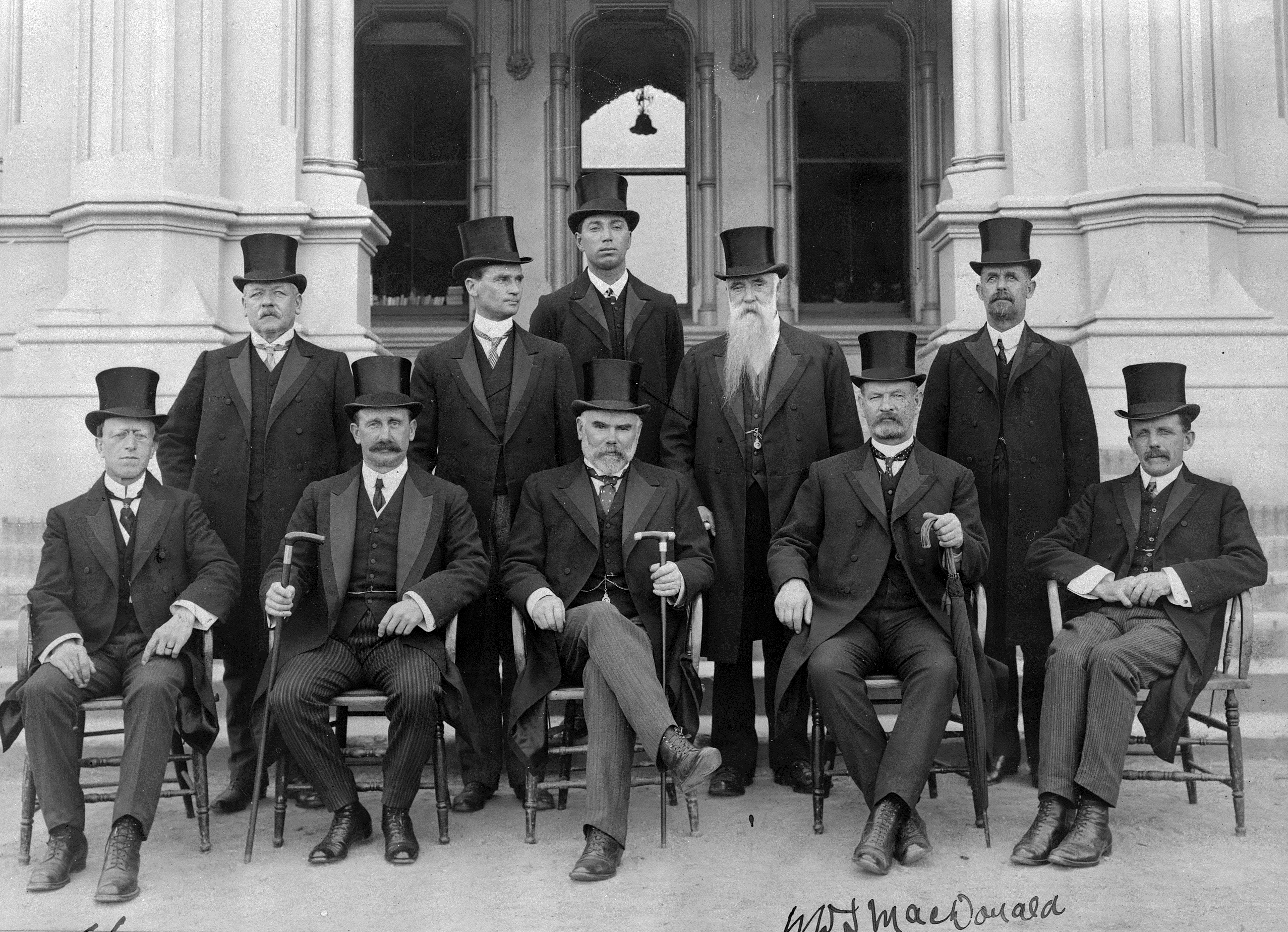
The MacKenzie Ministry, 1912.

- Increased funds were allocated to education.
- Many new schools were built each year, while the number of teachers grew more rapidly than students, enabling class sizes to be reduced.
- The Manual and Technical Instruction acts of 1900 and 1902 provided local authorities with the power to spend money on technical education and make land grants.
- Technical education was expanded, with 13,500 students attending such classes by 1912 at eight institutions.
- After 1895, students could receive assistance with rail transport to and from schools, and over the next few years small boarding allowances were paid as well.
- A free textbook scheme was launched.
- Bursaries were introduced for pupils who passed the matriculation exam with credit (1907). This led to a rise in the number of students who could attend university without having pay any fees.
- The Public-school Teachers' Salaries Act (1901) established a national scale of salaries.
- Higher leaving certificates were instituted to be awarded to secondary school students "who satisfactorily completed one year at approved post-matriculation studies" (1901). This ensured that any student who passed their university entrance examination and stayed another year at a secondary school studying an approved course could (if their work was of a good standard) receive a free university place for four years.
- New regulations for the examination and inspection of schools were introduced, which provided head teachers with greater freedom in the classification of their pupils.
- More secondary schools were brought into the national system (1903).
- By the outbreak of the First World War the national primary school service had been considerably improved.
- Free places in secondary schools were introduced (1902). By the end of the First Liberal Government, fewer than 20% of all secondary students paid any fees.

=== Foreign policy ===
- Declared the Flag of New Zealand as New Zealand's national flag in 1902.
- Committed New Zealand troops to the Boer War.
- Annexed the Cook Islands (1901)

New Zealand's foreign policy at this time expressed a sense of nationhood but also of Britishness: New Zealanders were proud of their young nation and of being part of the British Empire. The annexation of the Cook Islands can be seen as part of a desire to create a miniature empire in the Pacific, which would be part of the wider British Empire. New Zealand's enthusiastic involvement in the Boer War expressed both loyalty to 'mother Britain' and a sense of being a nation which could play its part on the world stage. The war was the first overseas conflict to which New Zealand committed troops. Although the New Zealand blue ensign became the country's national flag, the Union Jack, the flag of Great Britain, continued to be widely used (the medals awarded at the conclusion of the war featured the flag of the United Tribes of New Zealand).

=== Treaty of Waitangi and Maori ===
- Passed the Tohunga Suppression Act in 1907.
- The Māori Councils Act (1900) instituted local councils for Māori; although short-lived, it brought some improvements in health, slowed land sales, and provided Māori with more say in running their local affairs.
- A rudimentary district nursing system was set up in areas with a high Māori population.
- Māori medical services came to be co-ordinated under the auspices of the Department of Public Health.
- Housing conditions for Māori were considerably improved between 1904 and 1909.
- Six-thousand Māori were vaccinated between 1901 and 1905.
- Māori councils were provided with additional powers to enforce standards of hygiene (1901).
- Māori district high schools were developed.

=== Constitutional ===
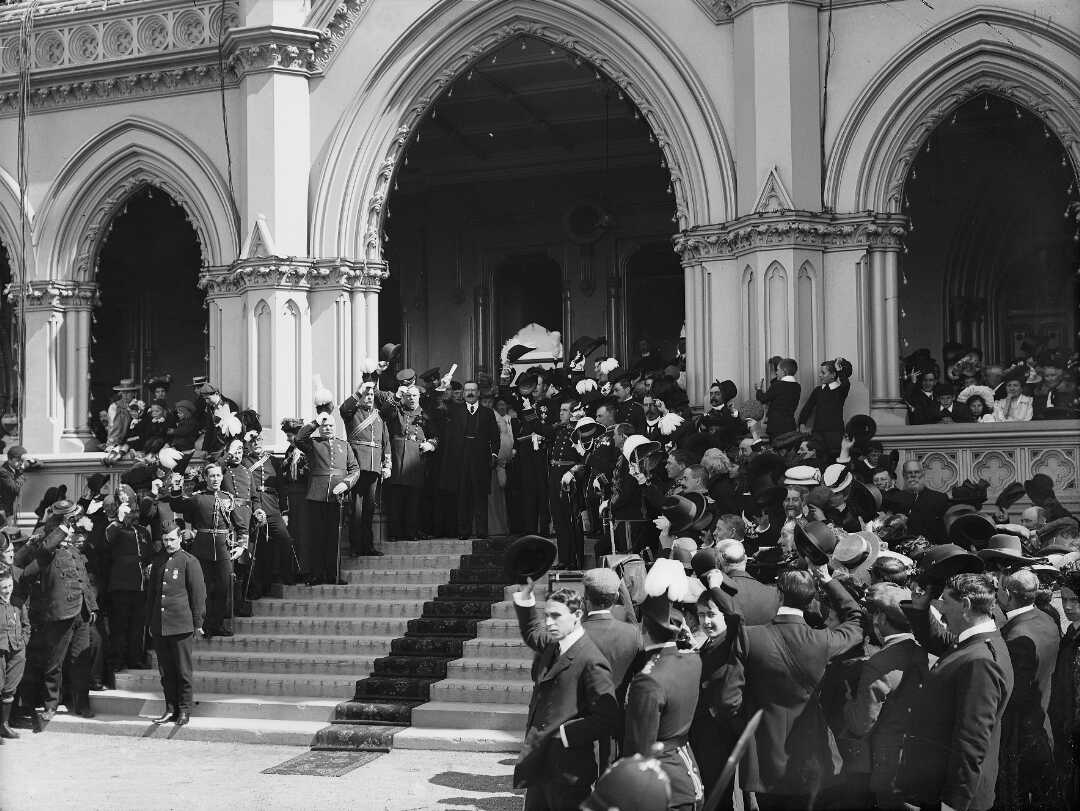
Governor Lord Plunkett declaring New Zealand a dominion on the steps of parliament in 1907

- Passed a resolution declaring New Zealand the Dominion of New Zealand in 1907, formally ending colonial status.
- Granted women's suffrage in 1893 (despite Seddon's efforts to have the Legislative Council stop it).
- Life membership in the upper house was reduced to a seven-year term.
- The stranglehold of the legislative council was broken.
- Women were granted practical equality and divorce rights.
- The Divorce Act (1898), and the repeal (1910) of the Contagious Diseases Act removed various forms of legal discrimination against women.
- A defence act was made law (1910) to introduce compulsory military training.
- The Crimes Act (1910) introduced the "reformative detention" sentence, which ensured that a person could be held for a period long enough for necessary reform training to be undertaken.

== Formation ==
The formation of the Liberal Party came after the victory of liberal-leaning members of parliament, led by John Ballance, at the 1890 general election.

The attempt by Harry Atkinson and other members of the previous government to stack the Legislative Council against the new government backfired on them.

== Defeat ==
The government lost its majority at the 1911 general election, but managed to stay in office with the support of independent MPs until the following year. The government was eventually defeated in a vote of confidence on 10 July 1912, with the defection of some Liberals like John A. Millar.

== Election results ==
Election	Parliament	Seats	Total votes ^{1}	Percentage	Gain (loss)	Seats won	Change	Majority
1890 ²	11th	74	76,548	56.1%	-	38	-	2
1893	12th	74	175,814	57.8%	+1.7%	51	+13	28
1896	13th	74	165,259	46.0%	-11.8%	39	-12	4
1899 ³	14th	74	204,331	52.7%	+6.7%	49	+10	24
1902 ^{4}	15th	80	215,845	51.8%	-0.9%	47	-2	14
1905 ^{5}	16th	80	216,312	53.1%	+1.3%	58	+11	36
1908 ^{6}	17th	80	250,445	58.7%	+5.6%	50	-8	20
1911 ^{7}	18th	80	194,089	40.7%	-18.0%	33	-17	-14

Notes:- 1. The vote totals and percentages, from 1890 to 1902, exclude the four Maori electorates. From 1890 to 1902 additional votes cast in four three-member electorates are included. The comparability over time of the vote totals are also affected by unopposed elections. The electorates where there was no contest numbered six in 1890, three in 1893 and 1899, and one in 1911.
2. There were no organized parties at the time of the 1890 election. The figures given are an approximate indication of the division of political opinion between Liberals and others.
3. The seat figures given are from the Elections New Zealand website. They are the same as those in the International Almanac of Electoral History.

== Prime Ministers ==
Five premiers and prime ministers (the title of premier was changed during the term in office of the government) served during the government's tenure, with two (Ballance and Seddon) dying in office:

Prime Ministers of the First Liberal Government

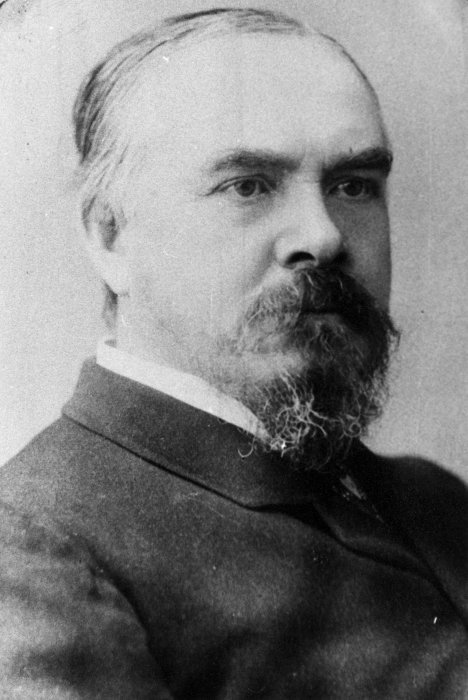
John Ballance
served 1891-1893

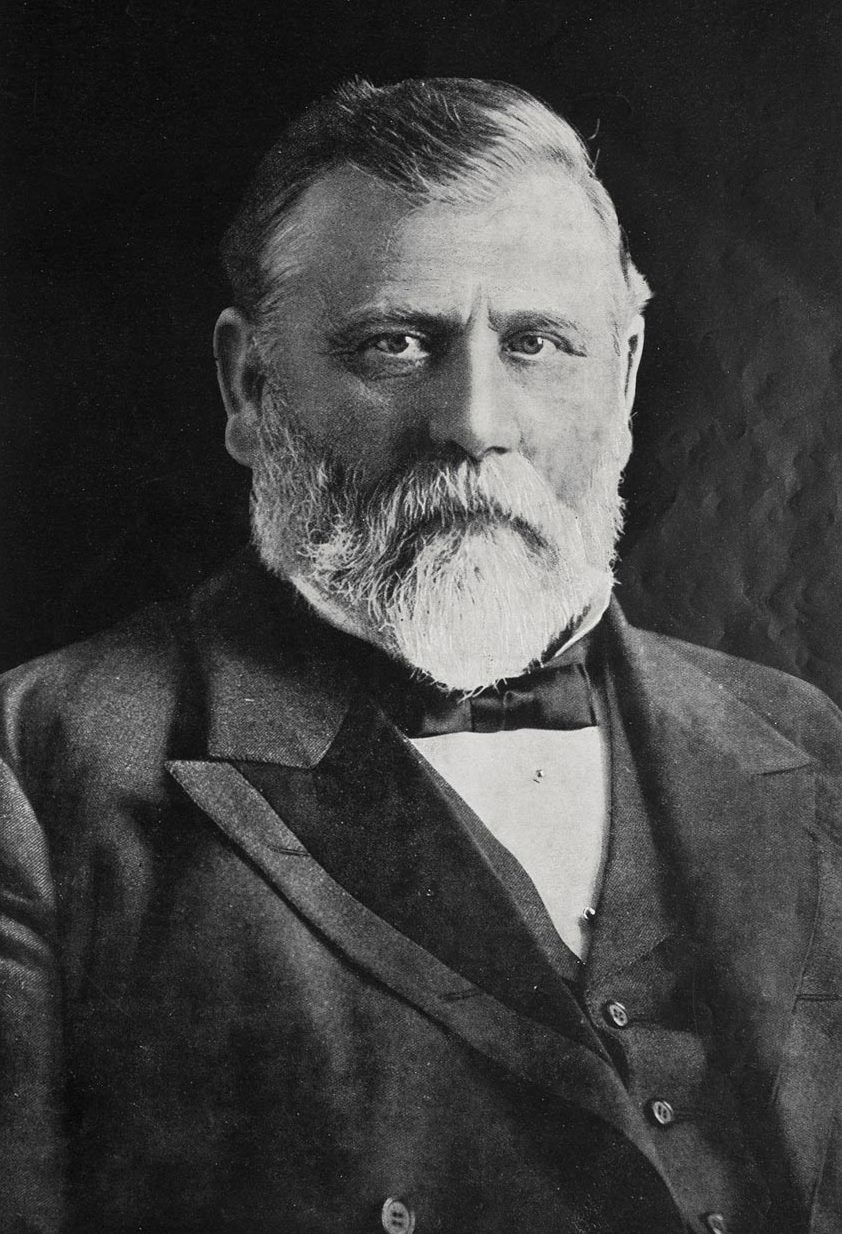
Richard Seddon
served 1893-1906

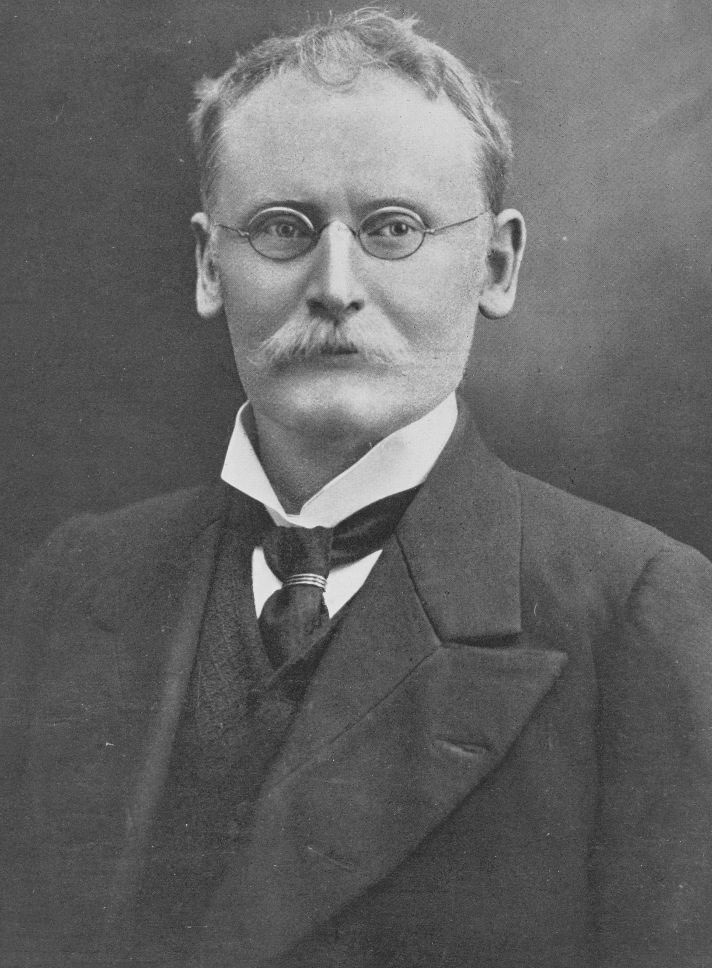
William Hall-Jones
served 1906

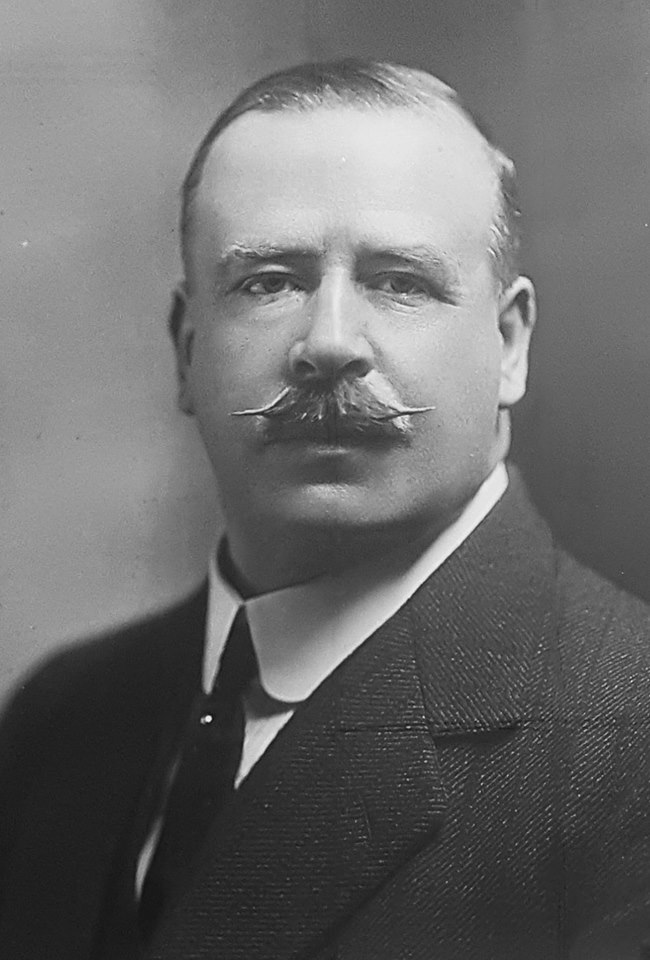
Joseph Ward
served 1906-1912

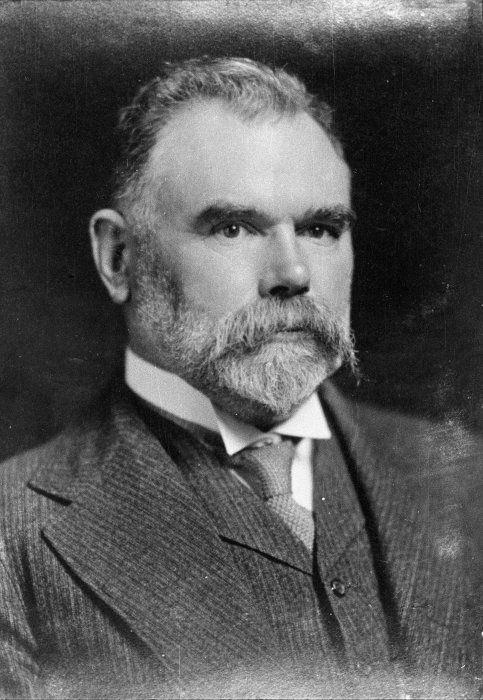
Thomas Mackenzie
served 1912

== Cabinet Ministers ==
Party key	Liberal Party
Party key	Independent Liberal

Portfolio	Minister	Start	End
Prime Minister	John Ballance	24 January 1891	27 April 1893
Prime Minister	Richard Seddon	27 April 1893	10 June 1906
Prime Minister	William Hall-Jones	10 June 1906	6 August 1906
Prime Minister	Joseph Ward	6 August 1906	28 March 1912
Prime Minister	Thomas Mackenzie	28 March 1912	10 July 1912
Minister of Agriculture	John McKenzie	24 January 1891	27 June 1900
Minister of Agriculture	Thomas Young Duncan	27 June 1900	6 August 1906
Minister of Agriculture	Robert McNab	6 August 1906	30 November 1908
Minister of Agriculture	Joseph Ward	30 November 1908	1 May 1909
Minister of Agriculture	Thomas Mackenzie	1 May 1909	10 July 1912
Attorney-General	Patrick Buckley	24 January 1891	20 December 1895
Attorney-General	Albert Pitt	22 June 1903	18 November 1906
Attorney-General	John Findlay	23 November 1906	26 December 1911
Minister of Customs	John Ballance	24 January 1891	27 April 1893
Minister of Customs	Joseph Ward	1 May 1893	16 June 1896
Minister of Customs	Richard Seddon	16 June 1896	29 October 1900
Minister of Customs	Charles H. Mills	29 October 1900	6 August 1906
Minister of Customs	John A. Millar	6 August 1906	6 January 1909
Minister of Customs	Alexander Hogg	6 January 1909	17 June 1909
Minister of Customs	George Fowlds	17 June 1909	4 September 1911
Minister of Customs	Roderick McKenzie	4 September 1911	26 December 1911
Minister of Customs	George Laurenson	28 March 1912	10 July 1912
Minister of Defence	Richard Seddon	24 January 1891	22 June 1896
Minister of Defence	Thomas Thompson	22 June 1898	23 January 1900
Minister of Defence	Richard Seddon	23 January 1900	10 June 1906
Minister of Defence	Albert Pitt	10 June 1906	18 November 1906
Minister of Defence	Joseph Ward	23 November 1906	28 March 1912
Minister of Defence	Arthur Myers	28 March 1912	10 July 1912
Minister of Education	William Pember Reeves	24 January 1891	10 January 1896
Minister of Education	William Campbell Walker	11 March 1896	20 June 1903
Minister of Education	Richard Seddon	22 June 1903	10 June 1906
Minister of Education	William Hall-Jones	21 June 1906	6 August 1906
Minister of Education	George Fowlds	6 August 1906	4 September 1911
Minister of Education	Josiah Hanan	28 March 1912	10 July 1912
Minister of Finance	John Ballance	24 January 1891	27 April 1893
Minister of Finance	Joseph Ward	27 April 1893	16 June 1896
Minister of Finance	Richard Seddon	16 June 1896	10 June 1906
Minister of Finance	William Hall-Jones	10 June 1906	6 August 1906
Minister of Finance	Joseph Ward	6 August 1906	28 March 1912
Minister of Finance	Arthur Myers	28 March 1912	10 July 1912
Commissioner of State Forests	John McKenzie	1 May 1893	27 June 1900
Commissioner of State Forests	Thomas Young Duncan	27 June 1900	21 June 1906
Commissioner of State Forests	Thomas Mackenzie	6 January 1909	10 July 1912
Minister of Health	Joseph Ward	8 November 1900	6 August 1906
Minister of Health	George Fowlds	6 August 1906	6 January 1909
Minister of Health	David Buddo	6 January 1909	28 March 1912
Minister of Health	George Warren Russell	28 March 1912	10 July 1912
Minister of Immigration	John McKenzie	24 January 1891	2 March 1896
Minister of Immigration	William Campbell Walker	2 March 1896	20 June 1903
Minister of Immigration	Richard Seddon	20 June 1903	10 June 1906
Minister of Immigration	Charles H. Mills	10 June 1906	6 August 1906
Minister of Immigration	James McGowan	6 August 1906	6 January 1909
Minister of Immigration	George Fowlds	6 January 1909	4 September 1911
Minister of Immigration	George Warren Russell	28 March 1912	10 July 1912
Minister of Industries and Commerce	Joseph Ward	20 January 1894	2 March 1896
Minister of Industries and Commerce	Thomas Thompson	2 March 1896	21 December 1899
Minister of Industries and Commerce	Joseph Ward	21 December 1899	23 November 1906
Minister of Industries and Commerce	James McGowan	23 November 1906	6 January 1909
Minister of Industries and Commerce	Thomas Mackenzie	6 January 1909	10 July 1912
Minister of Internal Affairs	John Findlay	19 November 1907	6 January 1909
Minister of Internal Affairs	David Buddo	6 January 1909	28 March 1912
Minister of Internal Affairs	George Warren Russell	28 March 1912	10 July 1912
Minister of Justice	William Pember Reeves	24 January 1891	28 May 1892
Minister of Justice	Alfred Cadman	28 May 1892	1 May 1893
Minister of Justice	William Pember Reeves	20 July 1893	6 September 1893
Minister of Justice	Alfred Cadman	6 September 1893	28 March 1895
Minister of Justice	William Pember Reeves	28 March 1895	10 January 1896
Minister of Justice	William Hall-Jones	20 February 1896	2 March 1896
Minister of Justice	Thomas Thompson	2 March 1896	23 January 1900
Minister of Justice	James McGowan	23 January 1900	6 January 1909
Minister of Justice	John Findlay	6 January 1909	26 December 1911
Minister of Justice	Josiah Hanan	28 March 1912	10 July 1912
Minister of Labour	William Pember Reeves	31 May 1892	10 January 1896
Minister of Labour	Richard Seddon	10 January 1896	10 June 1906
Minister of Labour	William Hall-Jones	21 June 1906	6 August 1906
Minister of Labour	John A. Millar	6 August 1906	6 January 1909
Minister of Labour	Alexander Hogg	6 January 1909	17 June 1909
Minister of Labour	John A. Millar	17 June 1909	28 March 1912
Minister of Labour	George Laurenson	28 March 1912	10 July 1912
Minister of Marine	Richard Seddon	3 June 1892	1 May 1893
Minister of Marine	Patrick Buckley	1 May 1893	13 October 1893
Minister of Marine	Joseph Ward	13 October 1893	16 June 1896
Minister of Marine	William Hall-Jones	16 June 1896	6 August 1906
Minister of Marine	John A. Millar	6 August 1906	28 March 1912
Minister of Marine	George Laurenson	28 March 1912	10 July 1912
Minister of Mines	Richard Seddon	24 January 1891	6 September 1893
Minister of Mines	Alfred Cadman	6 September 1893	21 December 1899
Minister of Mines	James McGowan	21 December 1899	6 January 1909
Minister of Mines	Roderick McKenzie	6 January 1909	28 March 1912
Minister of Mines	James Colvin	28 March 1912	10 July 1912
Minister of Native Affairs	John Ballance	24 January 1891	4 February 1891
Minister of Native Affairs	Alfred Cadman	4 February 1891	29 June 1893
Minister of Native Affairs	Richard Seddon	6 September 1893	21 December 1899
Minister of Native Affairs	James Carroll	21 December 1899	28 March 1912
Minister of Native Affairs	William MacDonald	28 March 1912	10 July 1912
Postmaster-General	Patrick Buckley	24 January 1891	4 February 1891
Postmaster-General	Joseph Ward	4 February 1891	16 June 1896
Postmaster-General	Richard Seddon	16 June 1896	21 December 1899
Postmaster-General	Joseph Ward	21 December 1899	28 March 1912
Postmaster-General	Harry Ell	28 March 1912	10 July 1912
Minister of Railways	Alfred Cadman	24 November 1895	28 April 1899
Minister of Railways	Joseph Ward	17 May 1900	13 January 1906
Minister of Railways	William Hall-Jones	13 January 1906	24 May 1908
Minister of Railways	John A. Millar	24 May 1908	28 March 1912
Minister of Railways	Arthur Myers	28 March 1912	10 July 1912
Minister of Revenue	Arthur Myers	28 March 1912	10 July 1912
Minister of Works	Richard Seddon	24 January 1891	2 March 1896
Minister of Works	William Hall-Jones	2 March 1896	30 November 1908
Minister of Works	Roderick McKenzie	30 November 1908	28 March 1912
Minister of Works	William MacDonald	28 March 1912	10 July 1912

== See also ==
- Governments of New Zealand
