= 1884 Stout–Vogel ministry =

Former government of New Zealand

The first Stout-Vogel ministry was a responsible government in New Zealand lasting less than a fortnight, not to be confused with the longer-lasting second Stout-Vogel ministry. It took office after the Continuous Ministry of Harry Atkinson fell to a confidence motion after the 1884 general election.

== Background ==
At the 1884 general election, Sir Julius Vogel returned to New Zealand politics with a manifesto promising more public works spending than the previous government had provided, while also cutting taxes. It was unclear, however, which of the several factions would be able to command a majority, so it was only when the new House met in August that Vogel and the liberal Robert Stout were able to put together a ministry. Stout was Premier, but Vogel was regarded as the real power in Cabinet. In disclaiming the premiership for himself, Vogel suggested that it would be too difficult to lead in the House as well as put together a budget on short notice.

Vogel and Stout were politically very different, leading to suspicions that they had only combined forces in order to save the speculative Waimea Plains Railway Company, with which they were both closely involved. James William Thomson moved a confidence motion alleging that they were “as different from each other as light is from darkness” and attracted votes from North Island members dissatisfied with the large number of South Islanders in the ministry. Despite winning the motion 52–33, Thomson failed to attract supporters and instead advised the governor to call Sir George Grey. Grey then attempted to form a coalition with Atkinson but was rebuffed, with the result that Atkinson returned to office for less than a week.

Stout and Vogel were able to return to power shortly thereafter with a reconstructed and more stable government.

== Ministers ==
The following members served in the first Stout-Vogel ministry:

Name	Portrait	Office	Term
Robert Stout		Premier	16 August 1884 – 28 August 1884
Robert Stout		Attorney-General	16 August 1884 – 28 August 1884
Sir Julius Vogel		Colonial Treasurer	16 August 1884 – 28 August 1884
Sir Julius Vogel		Postmaster-General and Commissioner of Telegraphs	16 August 1884 – 28 August 1884
Sir Julius Vogel		Commissioner of Stamps	16 August 1884 – 28 August 1884
Edward Richardson		Minister for Public Works	16 August 1884 – 28 August 1884
James Macandrew		Minister of Lands and Mines	16 August 1884 – 28 August 1884
James Macandrew		Minister of Immigration	16 August 1884 – 28 August 1884
William Montgomery		Colonial Secretary	16 August 1884 – 28 August 1884
William Montgomery		Minister of Education	16 August 1884 – 28 August 1884
John Ballance		Native Minister	16 August 1884 – 28 August 1884
John Ballance		Minister of Defence	16 August 1884 – 28 August 1884
Sir George Stoddart Whitmore, MLC		Member of Executive Council	18 August 1884 – 28 August 1884
George Morris		Commissioner of Trade and Customs	19 August 1884 – 28 August 1884

== See also ==
- New Zealand Government
