= List of New Zealand governments =

Coat of arms watermark used by the New Zealand Government

The New Zealand Government exercises executive power in New Zealand. This article lists spans of government under a party or coalition, as well as ministries under a prime minister. There have been three distinctly different periods of government in New Zealand—firstly, the period before responsible government; second, from 1856 to 1890, the period of responsible government; and the third period started with the formation of political parties in 1891.

== Guide to list ==
This article lists the successive governments of New Zealand since 1856. The first government which formed along political lines did not appear until 1891, when John Ballance formed the Liberal Party and the Liberal Government. A government is named (by political commentators, as well as self-referentially) for the largest party that leads it – though compare the United–Reform coalition Government of 1931–1935.

The term 'ministry', as used in this article, refers collectively to all the ministers who direct the government. It is described by Oxford Dictionaries as "a period of government under one prime minister". At the same time, a period of government under a particular party might be led by a succession of prime ministers and comprise multiple ministries. The ministry includes all government ministers, inside and outside of cabinet alike (up to the introduction of MMP in 1996, most ministers were in the cabinet). Elections do not cause dissolution of the ministry unless they result in the government's defeat.

Since the introduction of MMP in 1996, most New Zealand governments have comprised coalitions of two or more political parties, whether coalescing before and/or after general elections; thus referring to such governments as "nth National Government" or as "nth Labour Government" simplifies somewhat. An exception to this occurred in 2020, when the incumbent Labour Government, led by Prime Minister Jacinda Ardern, received a 'clear majority' (over 50%). In 2023, the National Party won the most seats and formed a coalition government with two smaller parties—the government is referred to by the media (and prospectively by the National Party itself) as the "sixth National Government".

== List of ministries ==
=== Period without responsible Government (1854–1856) ===
The New Zealand Constitution Act 1852 was an Act of the Parliament of the United Kingdom and was the second enactment to grant the colony of New Zealand self-government. The first elections for a New Zealand House of Representatives were held during 1853, and this lower house met for the first time in 1854 in Auckland. In practice, the country was initially governed by the Governor, George Grey, with the advice of the Civil Secretary and some officials that were appointed back in 1840/41, namely Andrew Sinclair (Colonial Secretary), William Swainson (Attorney-General), and Alexander Shepherd (Colonial Treasurer).

In the first session of the 1st New Zealand Parliament, three elected members took office under the leadership of James FitzGerald, to be later joined by two members of the Legislative Council. Whilst they were the first official Executive Government under the Constitution, the practical administration remained with the Government officials. The second Ministry led by Thomas Forsaith, which briefly formed during the second session of the 1st Parliament, also had no real power.

- Unofficial members: Fitzgerald Ministry, 1854; 14 June 1854 to 2 August 1854
- Unofficial members: Forsaith Ministry, 1854; 31 August 1854 to 2 September 1854

=== Cabinet Government (1856–1890) ===
Responsible government commenced with the third ministry, led by Henry Sewell during the term of the 2nd New Zealand Parliament:

- Sewell Ministry, 1856: 18 April 1856 to 20 May 1856
- Fox Ministry, 1856: 20 May 1856 to 2 June 1856
- Stafford Ministry, 1856–61: 2 June 1856 to 12 July 1861
- Fox Ministry, 1861–62: 12 July 1861 to 6 August 1862
- Domett Ministry, 1862–63: 6 August 1862 to 30 October 1863
- Whitaker-Fox Ministry, 1863–64: 30 October 1863 to 24 November 1864
- Weld Ministry, 1864–65: 24 November 1864 to 16 October 1865
- Stafford Ministry, 1865–69: 16 October 1865 to 28 June 1869

Note that Wilson says: "Ministry was defeated on 15 August 1866 and resigned, but carried on in a caretaker capacity. However 3 Ministers resigned and were replaced. Though this was regarded as a new ministry, it was in fact a reconstruction, and is so regarded here."

- Fox Ministry, 1869–72: 28 June 1869 to 10 September 1872
- Stafford Ministry, 1872: 10 September 1872 to 11 October 1872
- Waterhouse Ministry, 1872–73: 11 October 1872 to 3 March 1873
- Fox Ministry, 1873: 3 March 1873 to 8 April 1873
- Vogel Ministry, 1873–75: 8 April 1873 to 6 July 1875
- Pollen Ministry, 1875–76: 6 July 1875 to 15 February 1876
- Vogel Ministry, 1876: 15 February 1876 to 1 September 1876
- Atkinson Ministry, 1876: 1 September 1876 to 13 September 1876 (Continuous Ministry)
- Atkinson Ministry, 1876–77 (Reconstituted): 13 September 1876 to 13 October 1877 (Continuous Ministry)
- Grey Ministry, 1877–79: 13 October 1877 to 8 October 1879
- Hall Ministry, 1879–82: 8 October 1879 to 21 April 1882 (Continuous Ministry)
- Whitaker Ministry, 1882–83: 21 April 1882 to 25 September 1883 (Continuous Ministry)
- Atkinson Ministry, 1883–84: 25 September 1883 to 16 August 1884 (Continuous Ministry)
- Stout-Vogel Ministry, 1884: 16 August 1884 to 28 August 1884
- Atkinson Ministry, 1884: 28 August 1884 to 3 September 1884 (Continuous Ministry)
- Stout-Vogel Ministry, 1884–87: 3 September 1884 to 8 October 1887
- Atkinson Ministry, 1887–91: 8 October 1887 to 24 January 1891 (known as the Scarecrow Ministry)

Note that the Continuous Ministry is a term for the government of New Zealand from 1876 to 1890 (or 1887), except for 1877–79 and 1884–87. Sir Harry Atkinson was Premier, also Sir John Hall and Sir Frederick Whitaker. The Scarecrow Ministry of 1889–90 is sometimes included in the term.

=== Liberal Government of New Zealand (1891–1912) ===
- Ballance Ministry, 1891–93: 24 January 1891 to 1 May 1893
- Seddon Ministry, 1893–1906: 1 May 1893 to 21 June 1906
- Hall-Jones Ministry, 1906: 21 June 1906 to 6 August 1906
- Ward Ministry, 1906–1912: 6 August 1906 to 28 March 1912
- MacKenzie Ministry, 1912: 28 March 1912 to 10 July 1912

=== Reform Government of New Zealand (1912–1928) ===
- Massey Ministry, 1912–1915: 10 July 1912 to 12 August 1915
- National Ministry, 1915–1919: 12 August 1915 to 3 September 1919 (?)
- Massey Ministry, 1919–1925: 4 September 1919 to 14 May 1925
- Bell Ministry, 1925: 14 May 1925 to 30 May 1925
- Coates Ministry, 1925–1928: 30 May 1925 to 10 December 1928

=== United Government of New Zealand (1928–1931) ===
- Ward Ministry, 1928–1930: 10 December 1928 to 28 May 1930
- Forbes Ministry, 1930–1931: 28 May 1930 to 22 September 1931

=== United–Reform coalition Government of New Zealand (1931–1935) ===
- Forbes (Coalition) Ministry, 1931–1935: 22 September 1931 to 6 December 1935

=== First Labour Government of New Zealand (1935–1949) ===
- Savage Ministry, 1935–1940: 6 December 1935 to 1 April 1940
- Fraser Ministry, 1940–1949: 1 April 1940 to 13 December 1949
- "War Cabinet": 16 July 1940 to 21 August 1945
- "War Administration": 30 June 1942 to 2 October 1945

Note: The War Cabinet was responsible for all decisions related to war matters. The War Administration was charged with the responsibility for all matters connected with the war and with New Zealand's war effort. The War Cabinet acted as its executive body. Both included opposition members.
Note: Wood has three Fraser Ministries: 1 April 1940 to 29 October 1943; 29 October 1943 to 19 December 1946; 19 December 1946 to 13 December 1949.

=== First National Government of New Zealand (1949–1957) ===
- Holland Ministry: 1949–1957: 13 December 1949 to 20 September 1957
- Holyoake (First) Ministry: 1957: 20 September 1957 to 12 December 1957

Note: Wood has two Holland Ministries: 13 December 1949 to 26 November 1954; 26 November 1954 to 20 September 1957

=== Second Labour Government of New Zealand (1957–1960) ===
- Nash Ministry: 1957–1960: 12 December 1957 to 12 December 1960

=== Second National Government of New Zealand (1960–1972) ===
- Holyoake (Second) Ministry: 1960–1972: 12 December 1960 to 7 February 1972
- Marshall Ministry: 1972: 7 February 1972 to 8 December 1972

=== Third Labour Government of New Zealand (1972–1975) ===
- Kirk Ministry: 1972–1974: 8 December 1972 to 10 September 1974
- Rowling Ministry, 1974–1975: 6 September 1974 to 12 December 1975

Note: while Rowling was sworn in on 6 September, his ministers were not sworn in until 10 September

=== Third National Government of New Zealand (1975–1984) ===
- Muldoon Ministry, 1975–1984: 12 December 1975 to 26 July 1984

Note: Wood has three Muldoon Ministries: 12 December 1975 to 13 December 1978; 13 December 1978 to 11 December 1981; 11 December 1981 to 26 July 1984

=== Fourth Labour Government of New Zealand (1984–1990) ===
- Lange Ministry, 1984–1989: from 26 July 1984 to 8 August 1989
- Palmer/Moore Ministry, 1989–1990: from 8 August 1989 to 2 November 1990

Note: Geoffrey Palmer succeeded David Lange as Prime Minister on 8 August 1989; his ministers were appointed on 14 August 1989. Palmer was succeeded by Mike Moore on 4 September 1990. Moore made no separate ministerial appointments from those already appointed by Palmer.

=== Fourth National Government of New Zealand (1990–1999) ===
- Bolger Ministry, 1990–1997: from 2 November 1990 to 8 December 1997
- Shipley Ministry, 1997–1999: from 8 December 1997 to 10 December 1999

=== Fifth Labour Government of New Zealand (1999–2008) ===
- Clark Ministry, 1999–2008: from 10 December 1999 to 19 November 2008.

=== Fifth National Government of New Zealand (2008–2017) ===
- Key Ministry, 2008–2016: from 19 November 2008 to 12 December 2016
- English Ministry, 2016–2017: from 12 December 2016 to 26 October 2017

=== Sixth Labour Government of New Zealand (2017–2023) ===
- Ardern Ministry, 2017–2023: 26 October 2017 to 25 January 2023
- Hipkins Ministry, 2023: 25 January 2023 to 27 November 2023

=== Sixth National Government of New Zealand (2023–present) ===
- Luxon Ministry, 2023–present: 27 November 2023 to present

== Graphical timeline ==
Note: Colours signify the largest party within each government, i.e. the senior partner in a coalition government (with the exception of the United–Reform Coalition).

== See also ==
- Elections in New Zealand
- List of prime ministers of New Zealand
- List of parliaments of New Zealand
- Politics of New Zealand
