= 1884 Atkinson ministry =

Former government of New Zealand

The fourth Atkinson ministry was a responsible government in New Zealand, which lasted less than a week. It formed on 28 August 1884 after the fall of the first attempt at a Stout-Vogel coalition and lasted until Robert Stout and Sir Julius Vogel took back their majority on 3 September.

== Background ==
After the 1884 general election, in which a number of factions were returned to the House, a brief coalition between Sir Julius Vogel and Robert Stout took office, but was immediately ousted in a confidence motion proposed by James William Thomson. Thomson failed to form an alternative majority and advised the governor to call Sir George Grey; Grey attempted to form a coalition with ex-premier Harry Atkinson but was unsuccessful as Atkinson believed their followings would refuse to combine. Atkinson was then appointed Premier and attempted to come to an arrangement with Robert Stout, but failed.

Within a week, the ephemeral fourth Atkinson government was unseated in another no-confidence vote, this time with the Greyites voting them down in revenge for the earlier snub.

Atkinson’s ministry included Edward Wakefield, a nephew of Edward Gibbon Wakefield, who had pledged at the election to oppose Atkinson. After the fall of the government, Wakefield’s constituents presented him with a large dead rat.

== Ministers ==
The following members served in the fourth Atkinson ministry:

Name	Portrait	Office	Term
Harry Atkinson		Premier	28 August 1884 – 3 September 1884
Harry Atkinson		Commissioner of Stamps	28 August 1884 – 3 September 1884
George McLean, MLC		Commissioner of Trade and Customs	28 August 1884 – 3 September 1884
Edwin Mitchelson		Minister for Public Works	28 August 1884 – 3 September 1884
Edward Wakefield		Colonial Secretary	28 August 1884 – 3 September 1884
Richmond Hursthouse		Minister of Lands and Immigration	28 August 1884 – 3 September 1884
William Russell		Postmaster-General and Commissioner of Telegraphs	28 August 1884 – 3 September 1884

== See also ==
- New Zealand Government
