= National Government of New Zealand =

The New Zealand Government is the executive branch of government in New Zealand.

National Government of New Zealand may also refer to:

- First National Government of New Zealand (1949-1957)
- Second National Government of New Zealand (1960-1972)
- Third National Government of New Zealand (1975-1984)
- Fourth National Government of New Zealand (1990-1999)
- Fifth National Government of New Zealand (2008-2017)
- Sixth National Government of New Zealand (2023-since)

For a detailed list of each government, see List of New Zealand governments.
