= Historical liberalism in New Zealand =

This article gives an overview of historical liberalism in New Zealand. It is limited to liberal parties with substantial support, mainly proved by having had representation in parliament.

== Terminology ==
In New Zealand, the term "liberalism" has been used by a large variety of groups and organisations, but usually refers to a support for individual liberties and limited government. The term is generally used only with a reference to a particular policy area, e.g. "market liberalism" or "social liberalism". In its extreme form it can be known as "libertarianism", although this term is used less in New Zealand than in some other countries. Some historians claim that liberalism was a dominant force in New Zealand until around 1936, citing the strong position of the Liberal Party. However, there is (and always was) debate as to whether the Liberal Party was actually liberal—according to some observers, it would be better described as "socialist", although this was a common accusation made against early 20th century liberals, around the world.

Today, there is no party which is universally recognised as "the party of liberalism", although there are parties which attempt to claim this title—ACT New Zealand, for example, has labelled itself as "the Liberal Party". However, both major parties in New Zealand, the Labour Party and the National Party, have incorporated aspects of liberalism into their current agenda, with the former embracing social liberalism and the latter economic liberalism.

== Timeline ==
=== Liberal Party / United Party ===
- 1891: John Ballance, upon ousting the Continuous Ministry, and becoming Prime Minister, founds the Liberal Party. It is later led by Richard Seddon and Joseph Ward, among others, although some historians contend that none of the later leaders had the same ideological commitment to liberalism as Ballance and his allies.
- 1912: The Liberal Era comes to an end, with the ousting of the Mackenzie Ministry by the Reform Party (New Zealand).
- 1914: The outbreak of World War I leads to a wartime coalition between the Reform Party (New Zealand) and the New Zealand Liberal Party.
- 1927: Remnants of the party absorb the United New Zealand Political Organisation, adopting the name "United Party". The new party is led by George Forbes.
- 1936: The party merges with the conservative Reform Party to form the National Party.

=== Democrat Party ===
- 1934: Prominent "anti-socialist" political organiser Albert Davy founds the Democrat Party, with a strong focus on economic liberalism.
- 1935: The Democrats capture eight percent of the vote, but no seats.

=== New Zealand Party ===
- 1983: Bob Jones, a wealthy property tycoon, founds the New Zealand Party to promote both economic and social liberalism. Some consider the party to be mildly libertarian.
- 1984: The New Zealand Party captures twelve percent of the vote, but no seats.

== Liberal leaders ==
- George Grey
- Julius Vogel
- Robert Stout
- John Ballance
- Richard Seddon
- Joseph Ward

== See also ==
- Historical conservatism in New Zealand
- History of New Zealand
- Politics of New Zealand
- List of political parties in New Zealand
