= John Nathaniel Wilson =

New Zealand politician (1822–1895)

The Honourable John Nathaniel Wilson

Member of the New Zealand Legislative Council
- In office 23 November 1877 – 22 June 1893

Personal details
- Born: 1822
- Died: 14 November 1895 (aged 72–73) Weybridge, Surrey, England

John Nathaniel Wilson (1822 – 14 November 1895) was a New Zealand politician.

== Legal career ==
Wilson was active as a barrister and solicitor in England. He came to New Zealand in 1859 and established a legal practice that year in Napier. He was appointed Crown Prosecutor for the Hawke's Bay in late 1859. He resigned as provincial solicitor in June 1869 and was again appointed Crown Prosecutor for the Hawke's Bay in August 1870. In 1874, he took Arthur Cotterill as a partner and the practice was then known as Wilson and Cotterill. Wilson retired from the firm in January 1891.

== Legislative Council ==
Wilson was appointed to the New Zealand Legislative Council on 23 November 1877 by George Grey in order to strengthen the Government in that Chamber. This caused considerable controversy as the appointment happened during a time that a vote of confidence was pending. At first the governor, Lord Normanby, refused to make the appointment (a decision without precedent in New Zealand), but ultimately did so. It was thought that Wilson would replace George Stoddart Whitmore as Colonial Secretary, or replace Robert Stout as Attorney-General, but this did not happen. He was a member of the Grey Ministry as a member of the Executive Council without portfolio from 2 November 1878 to 8 October 1879. He was a supporter of the Liberal party in the Upper House, and took a deep interest in the reforms introduced by that party. He resigned from the Legislative Council on 22 June 1893 and retired to England.

== Death ==
Wilson died at Weybridge, Surrey, on 14 November 1895, from throat cancer.
