= Grey ministry =

Grey ministry may refer to:

- Whig government, 1830–1834, the British government led by Charles Grey, 2nd Earl Grey, from 1830 to 1834
- 1877–1879 Grey ministry, the New Zealand responsible government led by George Grey
