= Continuous ministry (New Zealand) =

Former government of New Zealand in the 1870s and 1880s

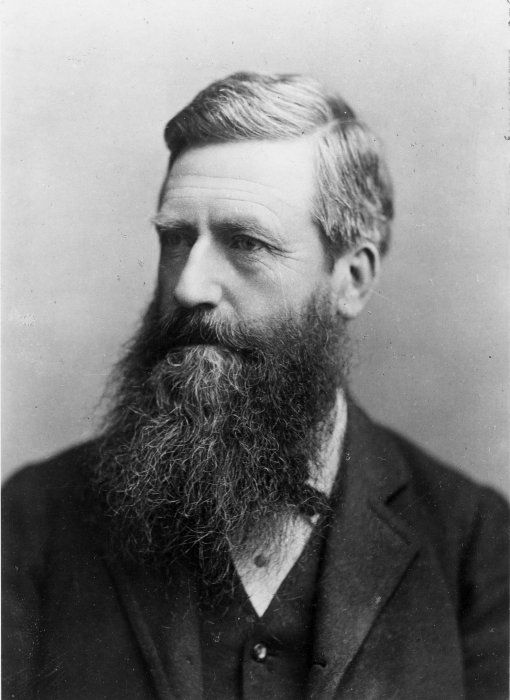
Sir Harry Atkinson, c. 1885

The Continuous Ministry was the government that dominated New Zealand from 1876 to 1891, excluding interludes from 1877 to 1879 and 1884 to 1887. Often led by Sir Harry Atkinson, the Continuous Ministry oversaw the abolition of the provinces, and governed through the period of global economic recession known as the Long Depression.

== History ==
Sir Harry Atkinson was the leading figure, although Sir John Hall and Sir Frederick Whitaker also served as Premiers, and William Rolleston was also part of the ministry. The term derives from William Pember Reeves, who as a Liberal politician emphasised the oligarchical and conservative tendencies of the ministry members, and downplayed as "reformers from above" Atkinson and Rolleston, even though they advocated some reforms similar to those of the Liberals of the 1890s. A later historian, Keith Sinclair, detached the Scarecrow Ministry of 1887–1890 as a new government rather than a continuation of the Continuous Ministry, although this ministry was formed by Atkinson. As formal political parties did not exist at this time, ministries had to be formed by negotiation with individual members, and were liable to be defeated.

The ministries of the Continuous Ministry were:

- 1876–1877 Atkinson ministry: 1 September 1876 to 13 September 1876
- 1876–1877 Atkinson ministry (reconstituted): 13 September 1876 to 13 October 1877
- 1879–1882 Hall ministry: 8 October 1879 to 21 April 1882
- 1882–1883 Whitaker ministry: 21 April 1882 to 25 September 1883
- 1883–1884 Atkinson ministry: 25 September 1883 to 16 August 1884
- 1884 Atkinson ministry: 28 August 1884 to 3 September 1884
- 1887–1891 Atkinson ministry: 8 October 1887 to 24 January 1891 (known as the 'Scarecrow Ministry')

The two (or three) ministries in the period that were not part of the Continuous Ministry were:

- 1877–1879 Grey ministry: 13 October 1877 to 8 October 1879
- 1884 Stout–Vogel ministry: 16 August 1884 to 28 August 1884
- 1884–1887 Stout–Vogel ministry: 3 September 1884 to 8 October 1887

== See also ==
- Historic conservatism in New Zealand
