= Continuous ministry =

Continuous ministry was an informal designation for two nineteenth century colonial governments:

- Continuous ministry (Queensland), 1890–1899
- Continuous ministry (New Zealand), in 1876, 1880–1883, and 1887–1890
