= 1878 City of Dunedin by-election =

New Zealand by-election

The 1878 City of Dunedin by-election was a by-election held on 1 July 1878 in the City of Dunedin electorate in Dunedin during the 6th New Zealand Parliament. At the time the electorate had three members.

The by-election was caused by the resignation of the incumbent, William Larnach. The winner was Richard Oliver.

== Results ==
1878 City of Dunedin by-election
Party	Candidate	Votes	%	±%
Independent	Richard Oliver	769	53.89	
Independent	Charles Stephen Reeves	658	46.11	
Majority		111	7.78	
Turnout		1427		
