= Patrick Buckley (politician) =

New Zealand politician (c. 1841 – 1896)

The Honourable Sir Patrick Buckley (Patrick Ó Buachalla) KCMG
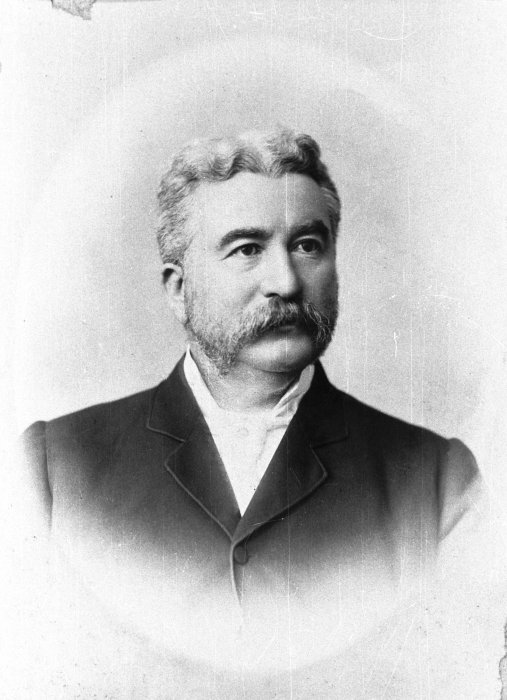

8th Attorney-General of New Zealand
- In office 24 January 1891 – 20 December 1895
- Preceded by: Frederick Whitaker
- Succeeded by: Albert Pitt

Personal details
- Born: c.1841 Castletownsend, County Cork, Ireland
- Died: 18 May 1896 Lower Hutt, New Zealand
- Party: Liberal

Sir Patrick Alphonsus Buckley KCMG (c. 1841 – 18 May 1896) was a New Zealand soldier, lawyer, statesman, and judge who held several high government posts in Wellington in the early 1890s.

== Early life ==
Buckley was probably born in 1840 or 1841, near Castletownshend, County Cork, Ireland. He was educated at the Mansion House School, Cork; St. Colman's College, Paris; the Irish College in Paris; and the Catholic University, Leuven. Buckley was in Leuven when the Piedmontese invaded the Papal States in 1860, and at the request of Count Carlo MacDonnell, Private Chamberlain to Pope Pius IX, he brought the recruits of the Irish Papal Brigade from Ostend to Vienna, where they were placed under representatives of the Holy See. He served under General Lamoricière, and after the war returned to Ireland.

== Australia ==
He emigrated to Queensland in 1862, where he completed his legal studies and was admitted to the bar.

== New Zealand ==
After a short residence in Queensland he settled in New Zealand in 1865, and began his law practice in Wellington. Soon after his arrival, he became a member of the Wellington Provincial Council. He first represented the Karori and Mākara electorate (1872–1873), and then the City of Wellington electorate (1873–1876). He was called to the Legislative Council on 23 July 1878, where he served to 20 December 1895 when he resigned. He was Colonial Secretary (1884–1887) and leader of the Upper House in the second Stout-Vogel Ministry, and Attorney-General (1891-1895) and Colonial Secretary (1891-1895) in the Ballance and Seddon ministries. Under John Ballance, he was also briefly Postmaster-General and Electric Telegraph Commissioner in 1891, but he was soon succeeded by Joseph Ward. Under Richard Seddon, he was also Minister of Marine in 1893. He was leader of an overwhelmingly opposition Upper House under the Liberal Government from 1891 until 1895, when he accepted the position of Judge of the Supreme Court. He was created Knight Commander of St. Michael and St. George in the 1892 Birthday Honours.

On 3 April 1869 he married Alice Jane, the only daughter of Sir William FitzHerbert.

He had land in the Wellington suburb of Melrose. Buckley Road, Melrose is named after him.

Fort Buckley, a defensive fort built on the slopes above Kaiwharawhara overlooking the port of Wellington was also named after him.

He died at Lower Hutt, New Zealand.

== Notes ==
Political offices
Preceded by Frederick Whitaker	Attorney-General; 1891–1895	Succeeded by Albert Pitt
Preceded by Edwin Mitchelson	Postmaster-General; 1891	Succeeded by Joseph Ward
New title	Electric Telegraph Commissioner; 1891	Succeeded by Joseph Ward
