= Richard Oliver (New Zealand politician) =

New Zealand politician

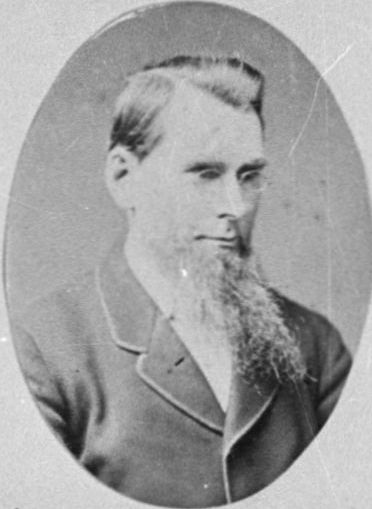
Richard Oliver in 1882

Richard Oliver (21 February 1830 – 27 November 1910) was a 19th-century Member of Parliament in Dunedin, Otago, New Zealand.

Oliver was the son of Robert Oliver, of Penzance, Cornwall, England, and Elizabeth (Fox) his wife, and emigrated to New Zealand.

New Zealand Parliament
Years	Term	Electorate	Party
1878–1879	6th	City of Dunedin	Independent
1879–1881	7th	City of Dunedin	Independent

Oliver represented the City of Dunedin electorate from 1878 to 1881, when he retired (to England). He was Minister of Public Works in charge of the Public Works Department in the John Hall Ministry from October 1879 to May 1881. He was included in the Frederick Whitaker Government as a member of the Executive Council till September 1883, when on a second reconstruction he became Postmaster-General and Commissioner of Electric Telegraphs under Major (later Sir) Harry Atkinson, retiring, with the rest of his colleagues, in August 1884. On 10 November 1881, he was appointed to the Legislative Council. He resigned from that role on 4 April 1901.

Oliver married first at Penzance on 18 June 1858, Ellen, daughter of William Purchase; and secondly, at Penzance, on 19 August 1885, Louise d'Este, daughter of J. S. Courtney, of Alverton House, Penzance, and sister of Right Hon. Leonard Courtney, M.P., Chairman of Committees, House of Commons.

== Death ==
Oliver had retired from public life in 1899 and retired to London, England. He was recovering from a road accident twelve months age, but died early on the morning of Sunday 27 November; although the news took several days to reach New Zealand by telegraph.

He left an estate of £78,975.

Political offices
Preceded by Thomas Dick	Postmaster-General; 1883–1884	Succeeded by Julius Vogel
Preceded by Thomas Dick	Electric Telegraph Commissioner; 1883–1884	Position abolished
