= Historical conservatism in New Zealand =

Conservatism in New Zealand, though related to that in other Western countries, developed uniquely over time. Advocates followed a political ideology that emphasised the preservation of traditional European beliefs, institutions and practices.

== History ==
=== Origins ===
Initially conservatism was a philosophy used by the "men in possession" of a new country, but most of all it espoused the spirits of individualism akin to Herbert Spencer's theories. Prior to the mid-1870s, New Zealand's political factions were based less on ideologies and more on provincial allegiances. This was to change however, with members of parliament becoming more identifiable as one of two groups—"Conservative" or "Liberal"—akin to Britain. The labels often walked hand in hand with each MP's stance on land policy. Nearly all those calling themselves conservatives supported freehold policy, while those labelled as liberals advocated for leasehold legislature.

From 1876 to 1890 the conservative factions dominated the House of Representatives. The so-called "Continuous Ministry" governed almost this whole period, with two breaks from October 1877 to October 1879 and August 1884 to October 1887, when "Liberal" ministries were formed under George Grey and Robert Stout, respectively. The Continuous Ministry was governing once again in 1887–88, the worst years of the Long Depression, when Premier Harry Atkinson became very unpopular, even with the wealthy his erstwhile supporters. The ensuing election in 1890 was a disaster. An ailing Atkinson resigned and a new ministry was formed under John Ballance, leader of the progressive New Zealand Liberal Party, the first organised political party in the country

=== Opposition to the Liberals ===
The beginning of party politics in New Zealand was a setback for conservative-oriented politicians, worsened by the accession of the immensely popular Richard Seddon to the premiership backed by a well-organised Liberal machine. His opponents struggled to set up an equivalent full-scale organisation in competition to the Liberal Party. Conservative politicians operated under various banners in this period such as the Political Reform Association (1887–91), the National Association (1891–99) and the Political Reform League (1905), with Leader of the Opposition William Massey accepting endorsement from the latter in the 1905 and 1908 elections. The conservatives struggled to contrast with appeal against Seddon and his Liberal political vehicle. William Pember Reeves, when asked of what differentiated the Conservatives from the Liberals in parliament, phrased them as "parties of resistance and progress" respectively.

Atkinson had some respite, stacking the Legislative Council with fellow conservatives, to control the Liberals from the upper house (often compared to the period 1906–11 in Britain where the Liberal government was blocked by peers in the House of Lords). Ballance eventually got his way with the Governor General by limiting the term of a MLC from life to seven years. However, the Liberals were not able to fully claim the upper house from the Conservatives until 1899. The beginning of the 1900s was the weakest point in New Zealand conservatism. Helped by jingoism in the Second Boer War, Seddon was at the height of his power, reigning supreme over parliament. By contrast, the Conservatives were disorganised, demoralised and, by 1901, leaderless. In 1902 a Sydney newspaper said of the Conservatives:

They have hardly [in 12 years] carried even a snatch division on a question about a culvert on a back country road. They could hardly remember how to draft a bill now, and they have forgotten what success looks like.

The Conservatives began to improve, with many initial supporters of the Liberals now defecting upon having now received the reforms they wanted in the 1890s. In the election of 1908 election, the Conservatives improved remarkably, gaining ten seats. Of further aid to the Conservative cause was the emergence of independent Labour parties who were leeching away supporters from the Liberals, particularly in cities.

=== Reform Party ===
In February 1909 Massey announced the formation of the Reform Party, New Zealand's first true right-wing political party, in his attempts to establish a credible vision to there being a possible alternative government to challenge the long established Liberal dominance. The name "Reform" was not new, but it served its purpose to efface the "Conservative" branding and party-image with which Massey's supporters were viewed.

The plan worked and following the 1911 election, the Liberals were ousted from power in a no-confidence motion, 41 votes to 33 on 5 July 1912. Massey became Prime Minister and formed the first non-Liberal government in 21 years.

In government, the Reform Party adopted several conservative policies on private land ownership and overseas borrowing, advocated low taxes and small government, and represented the interests of farming and business communities. The Reform Party remained in government between 1912 and 1928 and governed in coalition with the United Party, a remnant of the former New Zealand Liberal Party, between 1931 and 1935. The Reform Party also received some conservative urban support from the Protestant Political Association. During the Great Depression, the United-Reform coalition faced competition from other conservative groups including the New Zealand Legion andsupporters of C.H. Douglas' social credit theory. During the 1935 New Zealand general election, the United and Reform parties campaigned as the National Political Federation, but were defeated by the New Zealand Labour Party which would govern New Zealand for the next 14 years. The Reform-United coalition was reduced to 19 Members of Parliament (MPs) including two pro-National Māori MPs.

=== National Party ===
The New Zealand National Party was formed in May 1936 through the merger of the Reform and United parties following a conference at the Dominion Farmers Institute Building Conference Hall in Wellington. The formation of the National Party marked the beginning of an era of largely two-party Parliaments which lasted until the 1990s. Former United leader and Prime Minister George Forbes served as the first leader of the National Party until 1936, when he was succeeded by Adam Hamilton. Hamilton was succeeded by Sidney Holland, who served as party leader until 1957 and as Prime Minister between 1949 and 1957. As a conservative Baptist and British Empire loyalist, Holland advocated individualism, economic liberalism and opposed socialism.

During the 20th and early 21st centuries, the National Party built a reputation for advocating free enterprise, self reliance, individual freedom and small government. According to Colin James, the party's principles, policies and membership have embodied four broad tendencies: conservatism, liberalism, populism and libertarianism. National's conservative tendency has focused on preserving the status quo, centering the individual and family as the foundations of a cohesive society and favouring moderation over reactionary policies. The party's liberal tendency has focused on individual liberty, free markets, private enterprise and small government while acknowledging the need for a welfare state and public education system. National's populist tendency has focused on majoritarian opposition to socio-economic pressures while its libertarian tendency has advocated individualism, lower taxation, minimal government and greater choice in education and health services. According to James, the conservative and liberal tendencies have been the dominant forces within the parties while the populist and libertarian tendencies have been outliers; with their adherents often leaving National for alternative parties such as the populist New Zealand First and libertarian ACT New Zealand.

According to James, notable self-described conservative leaders in the National Party have included Deputy Prime Minister and Prime Minister Bill English and MP Simon Upton, who emphasised preserving the best elements of society including social order, personal and community responsibility, and conserving natural resources for future generations. James has described Prime Minister John Marshall and party leader Jim McLay as self-described liberal figures who advocated classical liberal positions such as liberty, individual rights, property ownership and capitalism. James has argued that several National Prime Ministers including Sidney Holland, Keith Holyoake and John Marshall practiced a mixture of liberal and conservative policies including preserving the welfare state while promoting individual rights, responsibility, property ownership and the free market. James has described Prime Minister Robert Muldoon as a populist due to his adoption of utilitarian programmes designed to appeal to the needs, fears and prejudices of "ordinary blokes" and his aggressive treatment of opponents and critics, which many alienated liberals and some conservatives within the party. Muldoon's disciple Winston Peters became the party's next populist standard bearer before leaving in 1992 to form the New Zealand First party, which absorbed much of National's populist tendency. James has also described National MP and Finance Minister Ruth Richardson as a radical libertarian due to her adherence to the free market theories of Adam Smith, Friedrich Hayek, Milton Friedman, the Chicago and Virginian schools of economic thought. As Finance Minister, Richardson implemented the controversial economic reforms of the Bolger National Government. After leaving Parliament in 1994, Richardson joined the libertarian ACT party.

== Leaders ==
Below is a list of the leading figures among the right wing members of parliament from the forming of the Continuous Ministry until the establishment of the Reform Party.

Key

Conservatives Liberals Liberal Party

No.	Name	Portrait	Term of Office		Prime Minister
1	Harry Atkinson		1 September 1876	29 July 1878	Atkinson 1876–77
1	Harry Atkinson		1 September 1876	29 July 1878	Grey 1877–79
2	William Fox		29 July 1878	6 September 1879	Grey 1877–79
3	John Hall		6 September 1879	21 April 1882	
3	John Hall		6 September 1879	21 April 1882	Hall 1879–82
4	Frederick Whitaker		21 April 1882	25 September 1883	Whitaker 1882–83
(1)	Harry Atkinson		25 September 1883	24 January 1891	Atkinson 1883–84
(1)	Harry Atkinson		25 September 1883	24 January 1891	Stout 1884–87
(1)	Harry Atkinson		25 September 1883	24 January 1891	Atkinson 1887–91
5	John Bryce		23 January 1891	31 August 1891	Ballance 1891–93
6	William Rolleston		31 August 1891	8 November 1893	Ballance 1891–93
6	William Rolleston		31 August 1891	8 November 1893	Seddon 1893–1906
7	William Russell		26 June 1894	3 July 1901	Seddon 1893–1906
8	William Massey		11 September 1903	11 February 1909	Seddon 1893–1906
8	William Massey		11 September 1903	11 February 1909	Hall-Jones 1906
8	William Massey		11 September 1903	11 February 1909	Ward 1906–12

== See also ==
- Historical liberalism in New Zealand
- History of New Zealand
- Politics of New Zealand
- List of political parties in New Zealand
