= Minister of Works (New Zealand) =

New Zealand minister of the Crown

The Minister of Works was a former ministerial position in the New Zealand Government appointed by the Prime Minister to be in charge of the Ministry of Works and Development.

== List of ministers ==
The following ministers held the office of Minister of Works.

Key

Independent Liberal Reform United Labour National

No.	Name	Portrait	Term of Office		Prime Minister
1	William Gisborne		27 September 1870	2 December 1871	Fox
2	John Davies Ormond		2 December 1871	10 September 1872	Fox
3	Thomas Gillies		10 September 1872	11 October 1872	Stafford
(2)	John Davies Ormond		11 October 1872	29 October 1872	Waterhouse
4	Edward Richardson		29 October 1872	4 January 1877	Waterhouse
4	Edward Richardson		29 October 1872	4 January 1877	Fox
4	Edward Richardson		29 October 1872	4 January 1877	Vogel
4	Edward Richardson		29 October 1872	4 January 1877	Pollen
4	Edward Richardson		29 October 1872	4 January 1877	Vogel
4	Edward Richardson		29 October 1872	4 January 1877	Atkinson
(2)	John Davies Ormond		4 January 1877	13 October 1877	Atkinson
5	William Larnach		13 October 1877	5 March 1878	Grey
6	James Macandrew		5 March 1878	8 October 1879	Grey
7	Richard Oliver		8 October 1879	31 May 1880	Hall
8	Walter Johnston		21 April 1882	23 November 1883	Whitaker
9	Edwin Mitchelson		23 November 1883	16 August 1884	Whitaker
9	Edwin Mitchelson		23 November 1883	16 August 1884	Atkinson
(4)	Edward Richardson		16 August 1884	28 August 1884	Stout
(9)	Edwin Mitchelson		28 August 1884	3 September 1884	Atkinson
(4)	Edward Richardson		3 September 1884	8 October 1887	Stout
(9)	Edwin Mitchelson		11 October 1887	17 October 1889	Atkinson
10	Thomas Fergus		17 October 1889	24 January 1891	Atkinson
11	Richard Seddon		24 January 1891	2 March 1896	Ballance
11	Richard Seddon		24 January 1891	2 March 1896	Seddon
12	William Hall-Jones		2 March 1896	30 November 1908	Seddon
12	William Hall-Jones		2 March 1896	30 November 1908	Hall-Jones
12	William Hall-Jones		2 March 1896	30 November 1908	Ward
13	Roderick McKenzie		6 January 1909	28 March 1912	Ward
14	William MacDonald		28 March 1912	10 July 1912	Mackenzie
15	William Fraser		10 July 1912	3 April 1920	Massey
16	Gordon Coates		3 April 1920	12 June 1926	Massey
16	Gordon Coates		3 April 1920	12 June 1926	Bell
16	Gordon Coates		3 April 1920	12 June 1926	Coates
17	Kenneth Williams		12 June 1926	10 December 1928	Coates
18	Alfred Ransom		10 December 1928	28 May 1930	Ward
19	William Taverner		28 May 1930	22 September 1931	Forbes
(16)	Gordon Coates		22 September 1931	10 April 1933	Forbes
20	John Bitchener		10 April 1933	6 December 1935	Forbes
21	Bob Semple		6 December 1935	21 January 1941	Savage
21	Bob Semple		6 December 1935	21 January 1941	Fraser
22	Tim Armstrong		21 January 1941	8 November 1942	Fraser
(21)	Bob Semple		8 November 1942	13 December 1949	Fraser
23	Stan Goosman		13 December 1949	12 December 1957	Holland
23	Stan Goosman		13 December 1949	12 December 1957	Holyoake
24	Hugh Watt		12 December 1957	12 December 1960	Nash
(23)	Stan Goosman		12 December 1960	20 December 1963	Holyoake
25	Percy Allen		20 December 1963	8 December 1972	Holyoake
25	Percy Allen		20 December 1963	8 December 1972	Marshall
(24)	Hugh Watt		8 December 1972	29 August 1974	Kirk
26	Arthur Faulkner		29 August 1974	10 September 1974	Kirk
(24)	Hugh Watt		10 September 1974	13 March 1975	Rowling
27	Mick Connelly		13 March 1975	12 December 1975	Rowling
28	Bill Young		12 December 1975	11 December 1981	Muldoon
29	Derek Quigley		11 December 1981	15 June 1982	Muldoon
30	Tony Friedlander		15 June 1982	26 July 1984	Muldoon
31	Fraser Colman		26 July 1984	15 August 1987	Lange
32	Richard Prebble		15 August 1987	8 November 1988	Lange
33	Bill Jeffries		8 November 1988	9 February 1990	Lange
33	Bill Jeffries		8 November 1988	9 February 1990	Palmer
34	Peter Neilson		9 February 1990	2 November 1990	Palmer
34	Peter Neilson		9 February 1990	2 November 1990	Moore
35	Doug Kidd		2 November 1990	3 October 1991	Bolger
36	Maurice McTigue		3 October 1991	1 July 1993	Bolger
37	Wyatt Creech		1 July 1993	21 December 1993	Bolger
