= Frederick Whitaker =

Premier of New Zealand (1863–1864, 1882–1883)

The Honourable Sir Frederick Whitaker KCMG
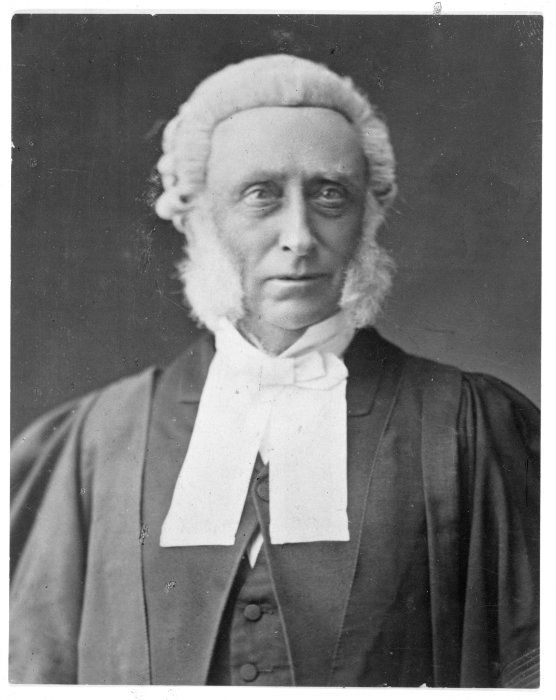
- Frederick Whitaker, c. 1870s

5th Premier of New Zealand
- In office 30 October 1863 – 24 November 1864; 21 April 1882 – 25 September 1883
- Monarch: Victoria
- Governor: George Grey; Arthur Hamilton-Gordon; William Jervois
- Preceded by: Alfred Domett (1863); John Hall (1882)
- Succeeded by: Frederick Weld (1864); Harry Atkinson (1883)
- Constituency: Legislative Council

Member of the New Zealand Parliament for Parnell
- In office 1866–1867

Member of the New Zealand Parliament for Waikato
- In office 1876–1879

2nd Speaker of the Legislative Council
- In office 1855–1856
- Preceded by: William Swainson
- Succeeded by: Thomas Bartley

1st Attorney-General
- In office 7 May 1856 – 20 May 1856
- In office 2 June 1856 – 12 July 1861

Personal details
- Born: 23 April 1812 Bampton, Oxfordshire, England
- Died: 4 December 1891 (aged 79) Auckland, New Zealand
- Resting place: St Stephen's Cemetery, Parnell, New Zealand
- Party: Independent
- Spouse: Augusta Griffith (m. 1843; died 1884)
- Children: 8, including: Frederick Alexander Whitaker
- Parent(s): Frederick Whitaker; Susanna Humfrey

Sir Frederick Whitaker KCMG (23 April 1812 – 4 December 1891) was an English-born New Zealand politician who served twice as the premier of New Zealand and six times as Attorney-General.

== Early life ==
Whitaker was born at the Deanery Manor House, Bampton, Oxfordshire, England, on 23 April 1812, the son of Frederick Whitaker and Susanna Whitaker (née Humfrey). Frederick junior undertook a legal education and became a solicitor and attorney at the age of 27. A year later he sailed to Australia and then New Zealand. He married Jane Augusta Griffith, stepdaughter of Alexander Shepherd (Colonial Treasurer) at St. Paul's Church in Auckland on 4 March 1843.

Whitaker lived in Auckland and was appointed a County Court judge until this position was abolished in 1844, at which time he returned to work as a lawyer. He was appointed to the General Legislative Council on 3 March 1845 until 22 December of that year. He was then appointed to the Legislative Council of New Ulster Province, but that Council had not met when the new Constitution arrived. He transferred to the new Legislative Council on 26 May 1853 and remained a member until his resignation on 19 December 1864. He was again appointed on 8 October 1879 and remained a member until his death 12 years later. He also served as a major in the militia.

He was elected onto the Auckland Provincial Council on 19 October 1854 for the Suburbs of Auckland electorate, and he served until 25 September 1855. He was appointed to the Auckland Executive Council from 14 March 1854 to 22 January 1855 and was the provincial law officer.

== Attorney-General ==
Whitaker became the first Attorney-General of New Zealand in the Sewell Ministry led by Henry Sewell in 1856. He did not serve as Attorney-General in the subsequent Fox Ministry that was in power for a fortnight, but was again appointed to this position in the Stafford Ministry from 2 June 1856 onwards. He served as Attorney-General until the defeat of the Stafford Ministry on 12 July 1861 and went back to the law. In October 1863 Whitaker was called upon to form a government to replace Premier Domett following his defeat at a vote of no-confidence.

== First Premiership ==
Whitaker's term as Premier lasted just over a year until November 1864. His term ended due to differences between himself and Governor Grey over the conduct of the New Zealand Wars. Whitaker also resigned as a member of the Legislative Council. He served briefly as the member of Parliament for Parnell from 1866 to 1867.

In October 1865, he was elected Superintendent of Auckland Province, which office he held until 1867. Then for nine years he stayed away from public office.

== Second Premiership ==
New Zealand Parliament
Years	Term	Electorate	Party
1866–1867	4th	Parnell	Independent
1876–1879	6th	Waikato	Independent

In 1876 he became MP for Waikato and later Attorney-General again in Atkinson's government; the Atkinson Ministry lasted until October 1877. Whitaker lost his seat in the House in 1879, when he was defeated for Eden. However, when Premier Hall wanted him to serve as Attorney-General again, he was appointed once more to the Legislative Council in 1879. When Hall resigned in April 1882, Whitaker became Premier for the second time, serving until September 1883.

Whitaker was appointed a Knight Commander of the Order of St Michael and St George in 1884 and served again as Attorney-General, and as leader of the Legislative Council from 1887 to 1890. By then his health was failing, and he died in Auckland on 4 December 1891. He was buried at St Stephen's Cemetery in Parnell.

== Notes ==
Government offices
Preceded by Alfred Domett	Premier of New Zealand; 1863–1864	Succeeded by Frederick Weld
Political offices
Preceded by William Swainson	Speaker of the New Zealand Legislative Council; 1855–1856	Succeeded by Thomas Bartley
New office	Attorney-General; 1856; 1856–1861; 1863–1864; 1876–1877; 1882–1883; 1887–1891	Succeeded by William Fox
Preceded by William Fox	Attorney-General; 1856; 1856–1861; 1863–1864; 1876–1877; 1882–1883; 1887–1891	Succeeded by William Fox
Preceded by Henry Sewell	Attorney-General; 1856; 1856–1861; 1863–1864; 1876–1877; 1882–1883; 1887–1891	Succeeded by Henry Sewell
Preceded by James Prendergast	Attorney-General; 1856; 1856–1861; 1863–1864; 1876–1877; 1882–1883; 1887–1891	Succeeded by Robert Stout
Preceded by Robert Stout	Attorney-General; 1856; 1856–1861; 1863–1864; 1876–1877; 1882–1883; 1887–1891	Succeeded by Henry Sewell
Preceded by Edward Conolly	Attorney-General; 1856; 1856–1861; 1863–1864; 1876–1877; 1882–1883; 1887–1891	Succeeded by Patrick Buckley
Preceded by Robert Graham	Superintendent of Auckland Province; 1865–1867	Succeeded by John Williamson
Preceded by George McLean	Postmaster-General and Commissioner of Telegraphs; 1876	Succeeded by John Davies Ormond
New Zealand Parliament
Preceded by Robert Creighton	Member of Parliament for Parnell; 1866–1867	Succeeded by Charles Heaphy
Preceded by William Jackson	Member of Parliament for Waikato; 1876–1879	Succeeded by John Blair Whyte
