= Postmaster-General (New Zealand) =

New Zealand political office

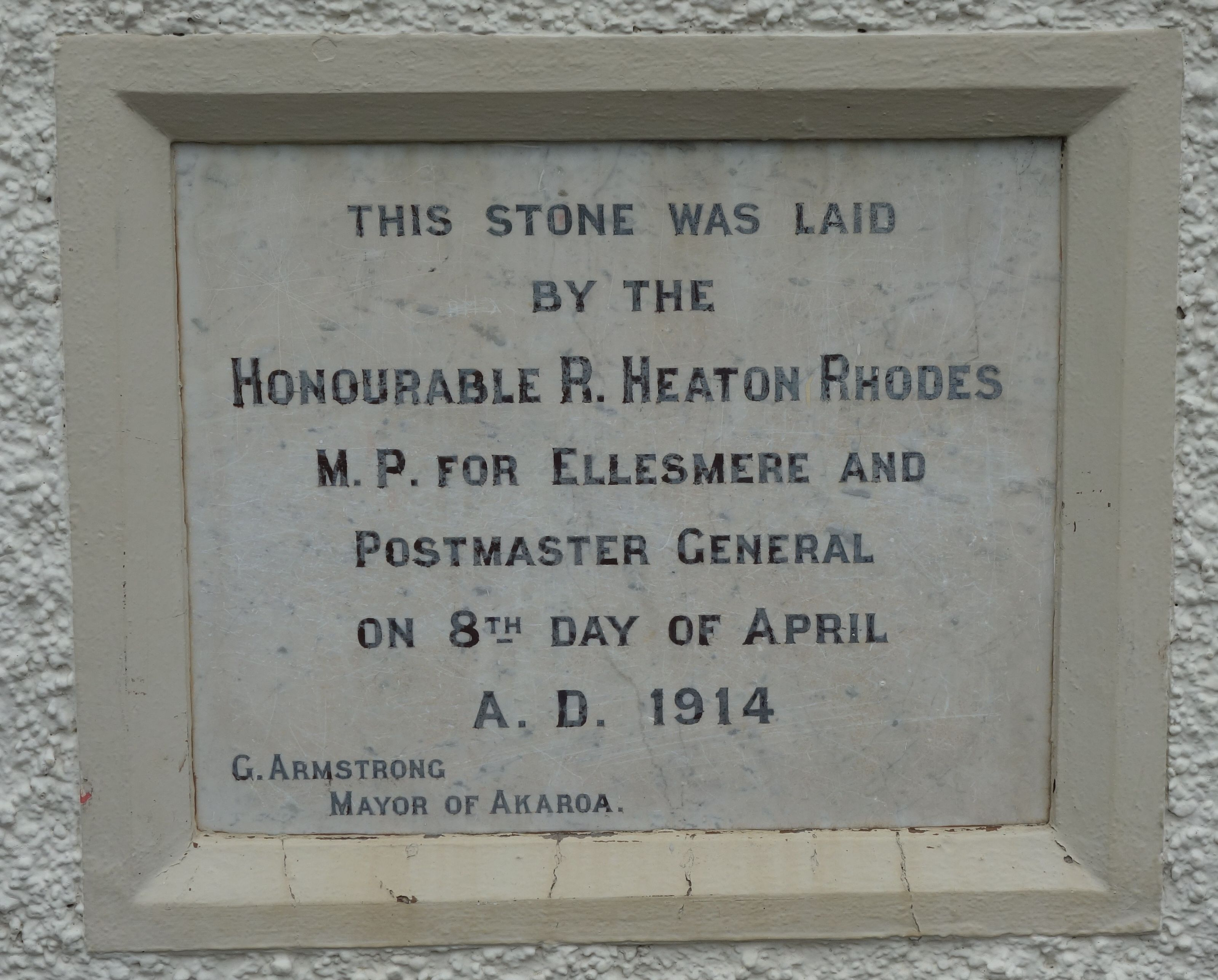
Foundation stone on the former Akaroa Post Office, commemorating Heaton Rhodes as Postmaster-General

The Postmaster-General in New Zealand was the government minister responsible for the New Zealand Post Office (NZPO) from 1858 to 1989, when the NZPO (formerly the Post and Telegraph Department) was split into three State Owned Enterprises, responsible to the Minister of State Owned Enterprises: New Zealand Post Limited, Telecom New Zealand Limited, and Post Office Bank Limited.

== History ==
From 1841 to 1853 the Postmaster-General was a civil servant, responsible to the Postmaster-General of New South Wales (1841–42) then the Postmaster-General of Great Britain (1842–53).

Governor Sir George Grey appointed Henry William Petre to be Postmaster-General on 13 August 1853, but his appointment was not accepted by the First Parliament that met in 1854, and he left for England early in the new year.

== Office holders ==
The following MPs have held the office of Postmaster-General:

Key

Independent Liberal Reform United Labour National

No.	Name	Portrait	Term of Office		Prime Minister
1	Henry Tancred		3 November 1858	12 July 1861	Stafford
2	Crosbie Ward		2 August 1861	6 August 1862	Fox
3	Walter Mantell		6 August 1862	21 August 1862	Domett
(2)	Crosbie Ward		21 August 1862	30 October 1863	Domett
4	Thomas Gillies		30 October 1863	24 November 1864	Whitaker
5	John Richardson		24 November 1864	16 October 1865	Weld
6	Edward Stafford		31 October 1865	8 May 1866	Stafford
7	James Paterson		8 May 1866	24 August 1866	Stafford
8	John Hall		24 August 1866	5 February 1869	Stafford
(6)	Edward Stafford		6 February 1869	28 June 1869	Stafford
9	Julius Vogel		6 February 1869	10 September 1872	Fox
10	Oswald Curtis		10 September 1872	11 October 1872	Stafford
(9)	Julius Vogel		11 October 1872	1 September 1876	Waterhouse
(9)	Julius Vogel		11 October 1872	1 September 1876	Fox
(9)	Julius Vogel		11 October 1872	1 September 1876	Vogel
(9)	Julius Vogel		11 October 1872	1 September 1876	Pollen
(9)	Julius Vogel		11 October 1872	1 September 1876	Vogel
11	George McLean		1 September 1876	13 September 1876	Atkinson
12	Frederick Whitaker		13 September 1876	7 December 1876	Atkinson
13	John Davies Ormond		7 December 1876	12 January 1877	Atkinson
(11)	George McLean		12 January 1877	13 October 1877	Atkinson
14	James Temple Fisher		15 October 1877	8 October 1879	Grey
(8)	John Hall		8 October 1879	9 March 1881	Hall
15	Walter Johnston		9 March 1881	11 October 1882	Hall
15	Walter Johnston		9 March 1881	11 October 1882	Whitaker
16	Thomas Dick		11 October 1882	25 September 1883	Whitaker
17	Richard Oliver		25 September 1883	16 August 1884	Atkinson
(9)	Julius Vogel		16 August 1884	28 August 1884	Stout
18	William Russell		28 August 1884	3 September 1884	Atkinson
(9)	Julius Vogel		3 September 1884	8 October 1887	Stout
19	Harry Atkinson		8 October 1887	17 October 1889	Atkinson
20	Edwin Mitchelson		17 October 1889	24 January 1891	Atkinson
21	Patrick Buckley		24 January 1891	4 February 1891	Ballance
21	Patrick Buckley		24 January 1891	4 February 1891	Seddon
22	Joseph Ward		4 February 1891	16 June 1896	Seddon
23	Richard Seddon		16 June 1896	21 December 1899	Seddon
(22)	Joseph Ward		21 December 1899	28 March 1912	Seddon
(22)	Joseph Ward		21 December 1899	28 March 1912	Hall-Jones
(22)	Joseph Ward		21 December 1899	28 March 1912	Ward
24	Harry Ell		28 March 1912	10 July 1912	MacKenzie
25	Heaton Rhodes		10 July 1912	12 August 1915	Massey
(22)	Joseph Ward		12 August 1915	4 September 1919	Massey
26	Gordon Coates		4 September 1919	30 May 1925	Massey
26	Gordon Coates		4 September 1919	30 May 1925	Bell
27	James Parr		30 May 1925	24 May 1926	Coates
28	William Nosworthy		24 May 1926	10 December 1928	Coates
29	James Donald		10 December 1928	18 December 1929	Ward
(22)	Joseph Ward		18 December 1929	28 May 1930	Ward
(29)	James Donald		28 May 1930	22 September 1931	Forbes
30	Adam Hamilton		22 September 1931	6 December 1935	Forbes
31	Fred Jones		6 December 1935	1 April 1940	Savage
31	Fred Jones		6 December 1935	1 April 1940	Fraser
32	Paddy Webb		1 April 1940	19 December 1946	Fraser
33	Fred Hackett		19 December 1946	13 December 1949	Fraser
34	Walter Broadfoot		13 December 1949	26 November 1954	Holland
35	Tom Shand		26 November 1954	12 December 1957	Holland
35	Tom Shand		26 November 1954	12 December 1957	Holyoake
36	Mick Moohan		12 December 1957	12 December 1960	Nash
37	Thomas Hayman		12 December 1960	2 May 1961	Holyoake
38	Arthur Kinsella		2 May 1961	20 December 1963	Holyoake
39	Jack Scott		20 December 1963	22 December 1969	Holyoake
40	Allan McCready		22 December 1969	9 February 1972	Holyoake
41	Bert Walker		9 February 1972	8 December 1972	Marshall
42	Roger Douglas		8 December 1972	10 September 1974	Kirk
43	Fraser Colman		10 September 1974	12 December 1975	Rowling
44	Hugh Templeton		12 December 1975	8 March 1977	Muldoon
45	Peter Wilkinson		8 March 1977	13 December 1978	Muldoon
46	Ben Couch		13 December 1978	22 August 1980	Muldoon
47	Warren Cooper		22 August 1980	11 December 1981	Muldoon
48	John Falloon		11 December 1981	19 February 1982	Muldoon
49	Rob Talbot		19 February 1982	26 July 1984	Muldoon
50	Jonathan Hunt		26 July 1984	24 August 1987	Lange
51	Richard Prebble		24 August 1987	5 November 1988	Lange
52	David Butcher		5 November 1988	14 August 1989	Lange
52	David Butcher		5 November 1988	14 August 1989	Palmer
