= Attorney-General (New Zealand) =

New Zealand minister of the Crown

Attorney-General of New Zealand
- Te Rōia Matua o Aotearoa (Māori)
- Coat of arms of New Zealand

- Flag of New Zealand

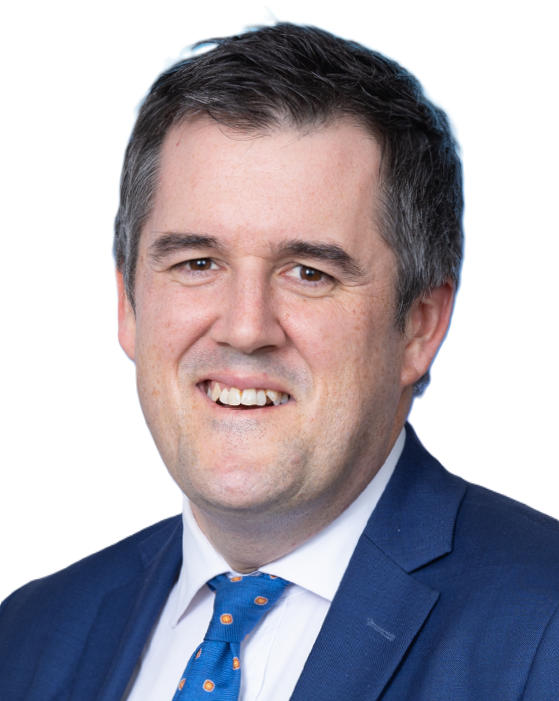
- Incumbent; Chris Bishop since 7 April 2026
- Crown Law Office; Parliamentary Counsel Office; Serious Fraud Office
- Style: The Honourable
- Member of: Cabinet of New Zealand; Executive Council
- Reports to: Prime Minister of New Zealand
- Seat: Wellington
- Nominator: Prime Minister
- Appointer: Governor-General of New Zealand; on the advice of the prime minister
- Term length: At His Majesty's pleasure
- Formation: 7 May 1856
- First holder: Frederick Whitaker
- Salary: $288,900
- Website: www.beehive.govt.nz

The Attorney-General (Māori: Rōia Matua) is a political and legal officer in New Zealand. The Attorney-General is simultaneously a ministerial position and the chief law officer of the Crown, and has responsibility for supervising New Zealand law and advising the government on legal matters. The Attorney-General serves both a political and apolitical function.

The current Attorney-General is Chris Bishop. As Bishop was unsuccessful in the 2026 New Zealand general election, he remains in office until at most 28 days after the 8 November election date.

== Responsibilities and powers ==
The Attorney-General has two main areas of official responsibility. One, the Attorney-General has ministerial jurisdiction over the Crown Law Office and the Parliamentary Counsel Office. They also had responsibility for the Serious Fraud Office from its founding in 1990 until 2008, when it was transferred to the Minister of Police. Two, the Attorney-General is the principal law officer of the Crown, responsible for supervising the state's administration of the law and for providing legal advice to the government. This includes upholding the rule of law and advising on compliance with domestic and international obligations. In the latter role (but strictly not in the former), the Attorney-General is assisted by the Solicitor-General, a non-partisan official. This reduces the extent to which the Attorney-General's actions on behalf of the state (as opposed to the government) can be influenced by their political allegiance.

A more complete description of the Attorney-General's powers can be found in the briefings to the incoming Attorney-General prepared by the Crown Law Office (most recently in July 2026).

At present, there is no statutory basis which establishes the office of Attorney-General, although the position is referenced by a number of other legal documents, such as the Constitution Act 1986 which allows the Solicitor-General to exercise the functions of the Attorney-General. The functions of the Attorney-General are also described in the Cabinet Manual.

There is no constitutional duty on the government to follow the advice of the law officers. The Cabinet Manual outlines the process by which the legal advice provided by the Attorney-General (and others) may be disclosed.

The Attorney-General is also responsible for advising the Governor-General on who should be appointed judges of the courts of New Zealand.

== History ==
The post of Attorney-General has existed since the separation of New Zealand as a distinct Crown Colony from New South Wales. It is a distinct position from that of Minister of Justice, although the two posts are sometimes held by the same person, for example, Martyn Finlay held both positions from 1972 to 1975.

Historically, the post could be held either by a politician or by a senior jurist, but today, it is invariably held by a member of Parliament. The Attorney-General is a member of the Executive Council and is usually appointed as a member of the Cabinet. (An exception is when David Lange was appointed Attorney-General outside Cabinet from 1989 to 1990.)

By tradition, persons appointed Attorney-General have been lawyers. Only two attorneys-general have not been lawyers, Prime Minister George Forbes who held the post from 1933 until 1935 and most recently Michael Cullen who held the post in 2005 and again from 2006 to 2008. In November 1906, when Albert Pitt died, there was no lawyer in the governing Liberal Party who was free take up the position. Hence Joseph Ward appointed John Findlay to the Legislative Council on 23 November 1906 and appointed him Attorney-General and Colonial Secretary on the same day.

The table below is an incomplete listing of New Zealand politicians who have held political appointment as Attorney-General since 1856. It does not show non-political attorneys-general. There were two previous attorneys-general before responsible government was introduced in New Zealand in 1856: Francis Fisher who held office for less than one year in 1841, and William Swainson who held office until 7 May 1856. Peter Wilkinson was the half-brother of his successor, Jim McLay.

== List of attorneys-general ==
Key

Independent Liberal Reform United Labour National

No.	Name	Portrait	Term of office		Prime Minister		
1	Frederick Whitaker		7 May 1856	20 May 1856		Sewell	
2	William Fox		20 May 1856	2 June 1856		Fox	
(1)	Frederick Whitaker		2 June 1856	12 July 1861		Stafford	
(2)	William Fox		12 July 1861	2 August 1861		Fox	
3	Henry Sewell		2 August 1861	6 August 1862		Fox	
4	Thomas Gillies		6 August 1862	23 August 1862		Domett	
(3)	Henry Sewell		23 August 1862	1 January 1863		Domett	
(1)	Frederick Whitaker		1 January 1863	24 November 1864		Domett	
(1)	Frederick Whitaker		1 January 1863	24 November 1864		Whitaker	
(3)	Henry Sewell		24 November 1864	16 October 1865		Weld	
5	James Prendergast		16 October 1865	1 September 1876		Stafford	
(1)	Frederick Whitaker		1 September 1876	13 October 1877		Atkinson	
6	Robert Stout		13 October 1877	8 October 1879		Grey	
(1)	Frederick Whitaker		21 April 1882	25 September 1883		Whitaker	
7	Edward Conolly		25 September 1883	16 August 1884		Atkinson	
(6)	Robert Stout		16 August 1884	8 October 1887		Stout	
(1)	Frederick Whitaker		11 October 1887	24 January 1891		Atkinson	
8	Patrick Buckley		24 January 1891	20 December 1895		Ballance	
8	Patrick Buckley		24 January 1891	20 December 1895		Seddon	
9	Albert Pitt		22 June 1903	18 November 1906		Seddon	
9	Albert Pitt		22 June 1903	18 November 1906		Hall-Jones	
9	Albert Pitt		22 June 1903	18 November 1906		Ward	
10	John Findlay		18 November 1906	26 December 1911		Ward	
-	Josiah Hanan acting		28 March 1912	10 July 1912		Mackenzie	
11	Alexander Herdman		10 July 1912	4 February 1918		Massey	
12	Francis Bell		4 February 1918	18 January 1926		Massey	
12	Francis Bell		4 February 1918	18 January 1926		Bell	
12	Francis Bell		4 February 1918	18 January 1926		Coates	
13	William Downie Stewart Jr		18 January 1926	24 May 1926		Coates	
14	Frank Rolleston		24 May 1926	10 December 1928		Coates	
15	Thomas Sidey		10 December 1928	22 September 1931		Ward	
15	Thomas Sidey		10 December 1928	22 September 1931		Forbes	
(13)	William Downie Stewart Jr		22 September 1931	28 January 1933		Forbes	
16	George Forbes		28 January 1933	6 December 1935		Forbes	
17	Rex Mason		6 December 1935	13 December 1949		Savage	
17	Rex Mason		6 December 1935	13 December 1949		Fraser	
18	Clifton Webb		13 December 1949	26 November 1954		Holland	
19	Jack Marshall		26 November 1954	12 December 1957		Holland	
19	Jack Marshall		26 November 1954	12 December 1957		Holyoake	
(17)	Rex Mason		12 December 1957	12 December 1960		Nash	
20	Ralph Hanan		12 December 1960	22 December 1969		Holyoake	
(19)	Jack Marshall		22 December 1969	2 February 1971		Holyoake	
21	Dan Riddiford		2 February 1971	9 February 1972		Holyoake	
22	Roy Jack		9 February 1972	8 December 1972		Marshall	
23	Martyn Finlay		8 December 1972	12 December 1975		Kirk	
23	Martyn Finlay		8 December 1972	12 December 1975		Rowling	
24	Peter Wilkinson		12 December 1975	13 December 1978		Muldoon	
25	Jim McLay		13 December 1978	26 July 1984		Muldoon	
26	Geoffrey Palmer		26 July 1984	4 August 1989		Lange	
27	David Lange		4 August 1989	2 November 1990		Palmer	
27	David Lange		4 August 1989	2 November 1990		Moore	
28	Paul East		2 November 1990	5 December 1997		Bolger	
29	Doug Graham		5 December 1997	10 December 1999		Bolger	
29	Doug Graham		5 December 1997	10 December 1999		Shipley	
30	Margaret Wilson		10 December 1999	28 February 2005		Clark	
31	Michael Cullen		28 February 2005	19 October 2005		Clark	
32	David Parker		19 October 2005	21 March 2006		Clark	
(31)	Michael Cullen		21 March 2006	19 November 2008		Clark	
33	Chris Finlayson		19 November 2008	26 October 2017		Key	
33	Chris Finlayson		19 November 2008	26 October 2017		English	
(32)	David Parker		26 October 2017	27 November 2023		Ardern	
(32)	David Parker		26 October 2017	27 November 2023		Hipkins	
34	Judith Collins		27 November 2023	7 April 2026		Luxon	
35	Chris Bishop		7 April 2026	5 December 2026	Incumbent		Luxon
