= Waterhouse (surname) =

Waterhouse From old German / Dutch, meaning a house by water. Most common in the Derbyshire, Lancashire and Yorkshire regions Old English locational surname.

== Notable people with this surname include ==
=== A ===
- Agnes Waterhouse (c. 1503 – 1566), first woman executed for witchcraft in England
- Alfred Waterhouse (1830–1905), English architect
- Andrew Waterhouse (1958–2001), British poet and musician
- Annie Waterhouse (c. 1814 – 1896), English illustrator, engraver, woodcutter and teacher

=== B ===
- Benjamin Waterhouse (1754–1846), American physician
- Benjamin Waterhouse Hawkins (1807–1894), English sculptor and natural history artist
- Bertrand James Waterhouse (1876–1965), Australian architect
- Bill Waterhouse (1922–2019), Australian barrister and bookmaker

=== C ===
- Charles Waterhouse (disambiguation), several names

- Charles Owen Waterhouse (1843–1917), English entomologist
- Charles Waterhouse (artist) (1924–2013), American painter, illustrator and sculptor
- Charles Waterhouse (British politician) (1893–1975), Conservative MP
- Charles Waterhouse, founder of Deerhurst Resort

- Clive Waterhouse (born 1974), Australian rules footballer

=== D ===
- Daniel Waterhouse, fictional character from Neal Stephenson's The Baroque Cycle novels
- David Waterhouse (disambiguation), several people

- David Waterhouse (Canadian football), see 1987 CFL draft
- David Waterhouse (1564–after 1638), MP for Aldborough (UK Parliament constituency) and Berwick-upon-Tweed

- Doug Waterhouse (1916–2000), Australian entomologist, inventor of the active ingredient in Aerogard

=== E ===
- Eben Gowrie Waterhouse (1881–1977), Australian academic and horticulturist
- Sir Edward Waterhouse (1535-1591), English administrator in Ireland
- Edward Waterhouse (FRS) (1619–1670)
- Edwin Waterhouse (1841–1917), English accountant, co-founder of "Price Waterhouse"
- Elisabeth Waterhouse (born 1933), English pianist and music teacher
- Ellis Waterhouse (1905–1985), English art historian
- Esther Kenworthy Waterhouse (1857–1944), British artist

=== F ===
- Frederick George Waterhouse (1815–1898), English naturalist, first curator of the South Australian Museum

=== G ===
- Gai Waterhouse (born 1954), Scottish-born Australian horse trainer
- George Waterhouse (disambiguation), multiple people, including

- George Robert Waterhouse (1810–1888), British naturalist
- George Waterhouse (politician) (1824–1906), Premier of South Australia and Premier of New Zealand
- George Waterhouse (footballer) (1899–1931), Australian rules footballer

- Gilbert Waterhouse (1883–1916), English architect and war poet
- Graham Waterhouse (born 1962), English composer and cellist, son of William Waterhouse
- Gustavus Athol Waterhouse (1877–1950), Australian entomologist

=== H ===
- Helen Thomas Waterhouse (1913–1999), archaeologist of ancient Greece
- Henry Waterhouse (1770–1812), British naval officer associated with European settlement of Australia
- Herbert Furnivall Waterhouse, (1864–1931), British surgeon and lecturer in anatomy

=== J ===
- Jabez Waterhouse (1821–1891), Australian Methodist minister
- Joey Waterhouse (born 1988), English footballer
- Rev. John Waterhouse, missionary father of George Waterhouse (politician) (1824–1906)
- John Waterhouse (astronomer) (1806–1879), inventor of Waterhouse stops in photography
- John Waterhouse (headmaster) (1852–1940), Australian educator, son of Jabez Waterhouse
- John Waterhouse Daniel (1845–1933), Canadian physician and Conservative politician
- John William Waterhouse (1849–1917), British Pre-Raphaelite painter
- Joseph Waterhouse (minister) (1828–1881), Australian Methodist minister and missionary in Fiji

=== K ===
- Kate Waterhouse (born 1983), Australian model
- Keith Waterhouse (1929–2009), English writer
- Kevin Waterhouse, American politician

=== M ===
- Matthew Waterhouse (born 1961), British actor
- Michael Waterhouse (1888–1968), British architect

=== N ===
- Nick Waterhouse (born 1986), American singer-songwriter and record producer

=== P ===
- Paul Waterhouse (1861–1924), English architect
- Peter Waterhouse (disambiguation), multiple people, including:

- Peter Waterhouse (writer) (born 1956), Austrian writer and translator
- Peter Waterhouse (scientist), Australian plant scientist
- Peter Waterhouse (military officer) (1779–1823), British military officer

=== R ===
- Rachel Waterhouse (1923–2020), English historian
- Richard Green Waterhouse, bishop of the Methodist Episcopal Church, South (Southern USA)
- Robbie Waterhouse, Australian bookmaker involved in the Fine Cotton scandal
- Ronald Waterhouse (judge) (1926–2011), Welsh High Court judge
- Rupert Waterhouse (1873–1958), English physician, see Waterhouse-Friderichsen syndrome

=== S ===
- Stephen Waterhouse, author of Passion for Skiing
- Steven Waterhouse (born 1956), American pastor and author
- Suki Waterhouse (born 1992), English singer, actress, and model

=== T ===
- Tom Waterhouse (born 1982), Australian bookmaker
- Trent Waterhouse (born 1981), Australian professional rugby league player

=== W ===
- Walter Lawry Waterhouse (1887–1969), Australian agricultural scientist
- William Waterhouse (disambiguation), several names, including:

- William Waterhouse (bassoonist) (1931–2007), English bassoonist, father of Graham Waterhouse
- William Waterhouse (violinist) (1917–2003), Canadian violinist
- William C. Waterhouse (1941–2016), American mathematician
- William Glenn Waterhouse (1893–1973), American Olympic sailor

== See also ==
- Waterhouse Island (disambiguation)
