= Waterhouse =

Waterhouse may refer to:

== Places ==
- Waterhouse, Tasmania, a locality in Australia
- Waterhouse Island (disambiguation)
- Waterhouse district of Kingston, Jamaica
  - Waterhouse F.C., a football club based in the Waterhouse district of Kingston, Jamaica
- Waterhouse Museum in New Jersey

== Other uses ==
- Waterhouse (surname), including a list of people with such name
- Waterhouse Company, a coachbuilder located in Webster, Massachusetts
- Waterhouse Natural History Art Prize, an annual prize awarded by the South Australian Museum

== See also ==
- Little Waterhouse Lake, Tasmania, Australia
- PricewaterhouseCoopers, an international professional services firm
- TD Waterhouse, a Canadian financial services corporation
- Waterhouse's swamp rat, a rodent species from South America
- Waterhouse's leaf-nosed bat, a species of bat from Central America
- Waterhouses (disambiguation)
- William H. Waterhouse House, a historic home in Maitland, Florida
