= Joseph Waterhouse =

Joseph Waterhouse may refer to:

- Joey Waterhouse (born 1987), English footballer
- Joseph Waterhouse (minister) (1828–1881), Australian Methodist minister and missionary in Fiji
