= Kingswood School =

Independent school in Bath, England

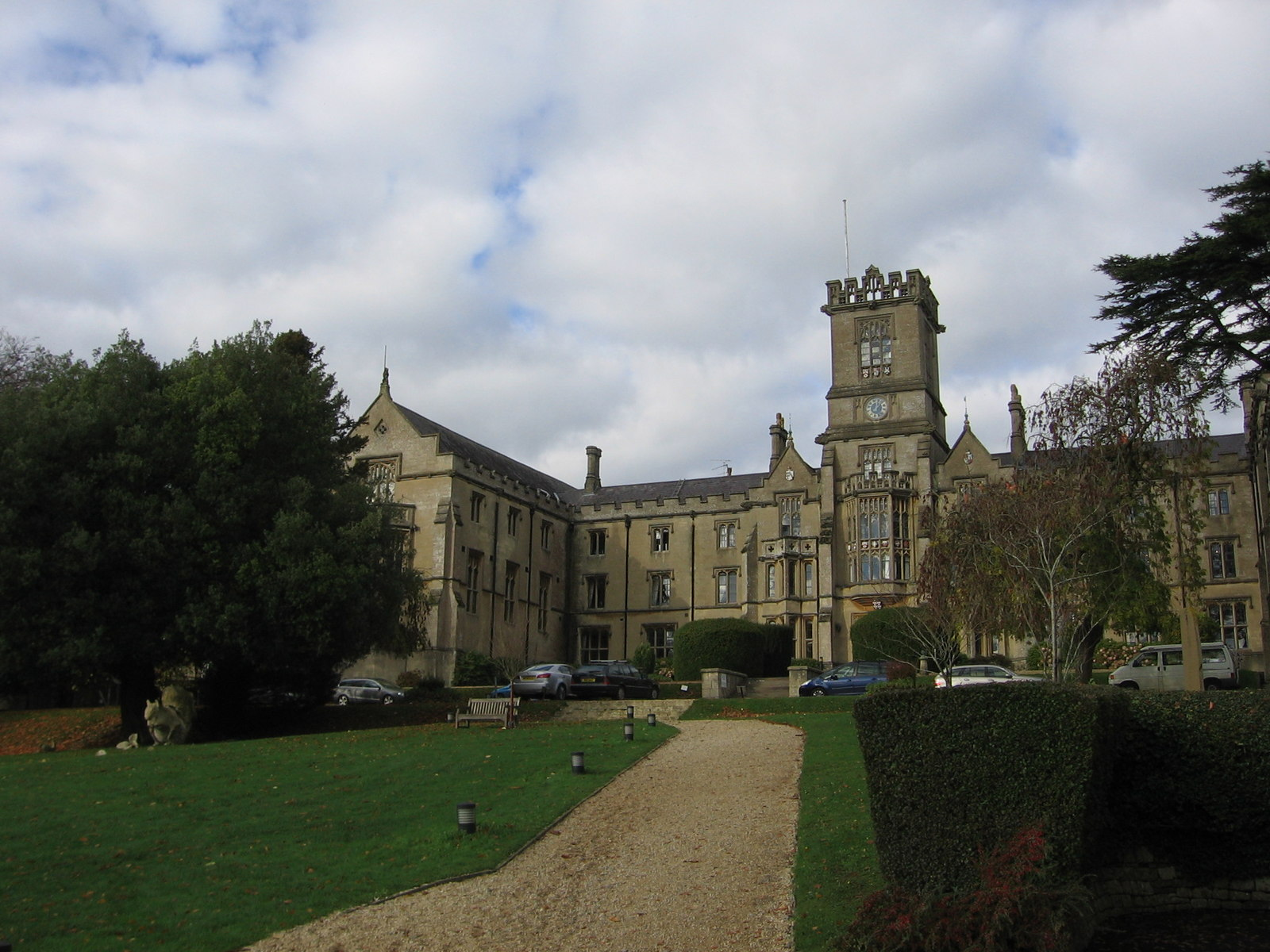

Location
- Lansdown Road, Fonthill Road and College Road; Bath, Somerset, BA1 5RG; England; 51.399°N 2.370°W

Information
- Type: Private
- Motto: Latin: In Via Recta Celeriter (In The Right Way Quickly)
- Religious affiliation: Methodist
- Established: 1748; 278 years ago
- Founder: John Wesley
- Chairman of Governors: Paul Baines
- Headmaster: Andrew Gordon-Brown
- Gender: Mixed (boys-only before 1972)
- Age: 9 months to 18
- Enrolment: 1,102
- Houses: 7
- Colours: Red, black and white
- Former pupils: Old Kingswoodians
- Member of: Headmasters' and Headmistresses' Conference
- Mascot: Wyvern
- Website: www.kingswood.bath.sch.uk

Kingswood School is a private day and boarding school in Bath, Somerset, England. The school is coeducational and educates over 1,000 pupils aged 9 months to 18 years. It was founded by John Wesley, the founder of Methodism, in 1748, and is the world's oldest Methodist educational institution. The school was established to provide an education for the sons of colliers and Methodist ministers. It owns the Kingswood Preparatory School, the Upper and Middle Playing Fields and a number of other buildings.

== History ==
Kingswood School was founded by John Wesley in 1748 in Kingswood (then known as King's Wood) near Bristol as a school for the children of the local colliers. The ministers in the early Methodist Church were itinerant and the school started to accept their children as boarders. Eventually the ministers' sons became the whole establishment, along with a few non-boarding local girls. After Wesley's death, Rev Joseph Bradford was appointed as the first governor in 1795. Woodhouse Grove School was founded in 1812 and was linked with Kingswood as a prep school for much of the nineteenth century. Created in 1995, Kingswood Prep School had 300 pupils in 2010. In 2010, the number of students attending the Kingswood School campus between the ages of 9 months and 18 was 960.

The 1862 book How it was done at Stow School written by Theophilus Woolmer seems to have been based upon the author's own experiences at Kingswood (rather than Stowe School which was not yet established) under the notorious headmaster Crowther, who enforced harsh discipline in the school in the 1820s.

The school moved to its present site on the northern slopes of Bath in 1851. It is in the midst of 218 acres (0.88 km^{2}) of the former Lansdown estate of the nineteenth-century millionaire eccentric, William Thomas Beckford. The Upper Playing Fields, comprising some 57 acres, are to the north of the senior school and include an athletics track and tennis and netball courts.

Sons of lay people were first admitted to the school in 1922.

1939 This stone 1946
from the buildings of
Uppingham School
records thanksgiving
for friendship and
preservation in exile

This stone
from the buildings of
Kingswood School
records enduring
gratitude for friendship
and preservation 1939–1946

During World War II the Kingswood buildings were requisitioned by the government and used by the Admiralty for military planning purposes. The school was evacuated to Uppingham School in the East Midlands and continued to function there. The Mulberry harbours used on D-day for the landing on the Normandy beaches were designed at the school and for many years it was thought that they were named after the Mulberry tree that still stands at the front of the school, whereas Mulberry was simply the next code word on a list.

The Moulton Hall was named after ex-pupil Lord Moulton but was remodelled as a library/learning resources area in 2006, and is now called the J O Heap library following a generous bequest from another ex-pupil.

During World War II the younger boys were moved to Prior's Court, an estate owned by Colonel Gerald Palmer, MP for Winchester. After the war the estate was purchased from Colonel Palmer and run as a Preparatory School until it was sold in 1997. A small number of boys (around six) started in the Junior house (Westwood) before the war, moved to Prior's Court on the outbreak of war, on to Uppingham and finally back to Kingswood at the war's end. In memory of the event a stone was taken from the Kingswood library, engraved and set in the Uppingham buildings. An Uppingham stone was likewise sent to Kingswood and incorporated in the library wall. The inscriptions on the stones are shown in the accompanying boxes.

Some girls were admitted to the Bristol site in the early days before the school became boarding-only. Girls were admitted to the school in its current form from 1972.

== Organisation ==
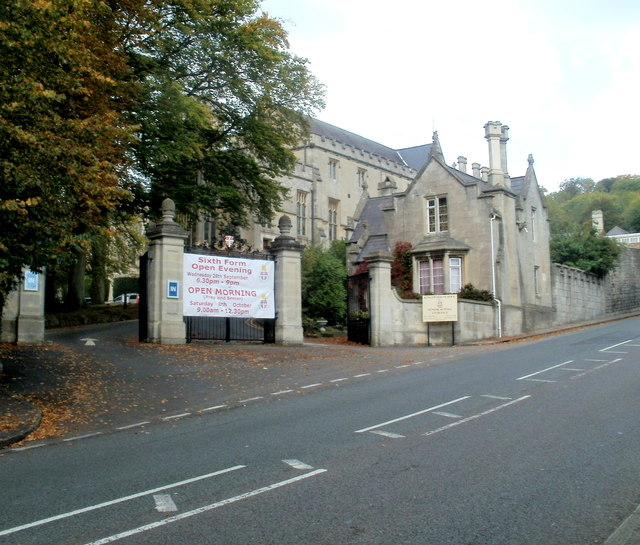
Senior School entrance

Kingswood pupils are divided into boarding houses for both living convenience and sporting competitiveness. Each boys' house is paired with a girls' house (Upper with School, Hall with Fonthill and Middle with Summerhill). This is mainly for social events and unisex sports fixtures (e.g. sports day).

Pupils enter one of six houses in Year 9:

Boys

- Upper (now day boys)
- Middle (day and boarding boys)
- Hall (day and boarding boys)

Girls

- School (day girls, no longer sixth form boarding)
- Summerhill (day and boarding girls)
- Fonthill (day and boarding girls)

Junior House

- Westwood (day and boarding for boys & girls in years 7 and 8), the largest house with approximately 170-day children and 30 boarders. Westwood is split into two houses for sports and other events, Mulberry and Phoenix.

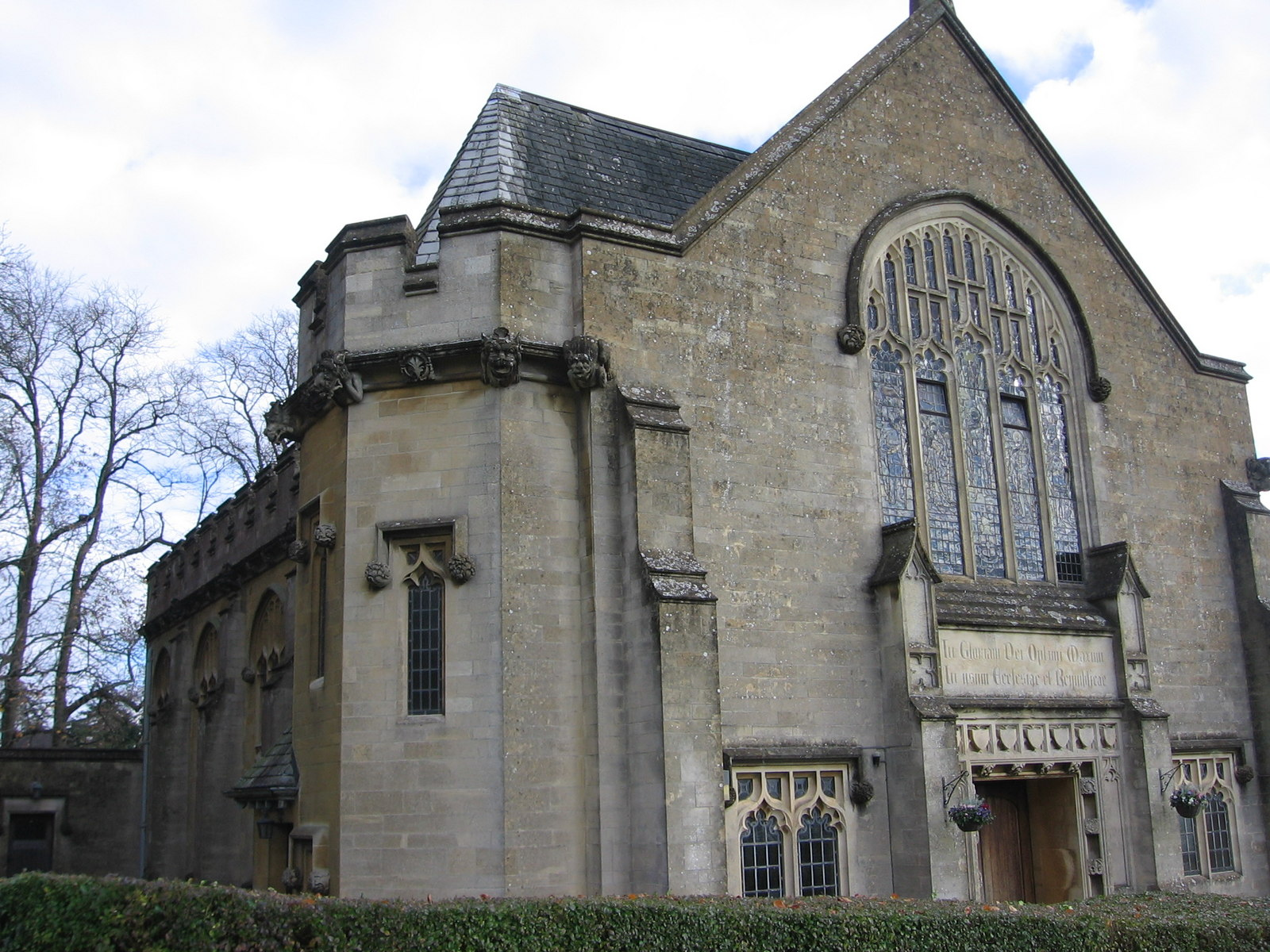
The chapel

Chapel attendance is compulsory at least once a week.

== Music ==
Kingswood School also has a Music Department, providing students with the opportunity to be part of numerous choirs, orchestras, bands and ensembles, including Westwood Voices, Westwood Orchestra, Senior Choir, Chamber Choir, Westwood Orchestra, Brass Ensemble, String Group and Clarinet Group. The school Jazz Band, "KJO" (Kingswood Jazz Orchestra), performs on the first night of Bath International Music Festival in Bath's Green Park Station. Visiting music teachers offer tuition in a range of instruments, and the school provides opportunities for pupils to perform individually in regular informal lunchtime and teatime concerts, as well as in ensembles in the larger Christmas and Spring Concerts. The school also has 15–20 music scholars who contribute to the musical life of the school and perform in an annual concert in January.

The composer John Sykes was a teacher at the school from 1936, and was Director of Music from 1952 until his death ten years later. The school holds his manuscripts in the John Sykes Archive.

== Kingswood Theatre ==
Used by the school during term time and available for hire during school holidays, Kingswood Theatre is on the site of the senior school. The theatre was officially opened in 1994 by Sir Edward Heath and completed partial refurbishments in 2010 and was refurbished again in 2024. The theatre has 366 seats with a capacity of 450. The theatre has been used by BBC Question Time on a number of occasions.

== Academic Results ==
GCSE Results (2023):

  - 62% achieved grades 9-7.

A Level Results (2023):

  - 53% achieved grades A/A*.
  - 83% achieved grades A-B*.

GCSE Results (2019 – Pre-Pandemic):

  - 62% achieved grades 9-7.

A Level Results (2019 – Pre-Pandemic):

  - 34% achieved grades A/A*.
  - 67% achieved grades A-B*.

== Model United Nations ==
Kingswood hosts an annual international Model United Nations conference, known as the Bath International Schools Model United Nations (BISMUN). Delegates attend from schools worldwide to engage in debates around a range of pressing international issues.

== Eco-schools ==
The School has implemented a number of projects to promote the importance of the environment and reduce waste at the school. The School is currently in the process of planting of many new trees and are planning a new energy system using solar and wind power. Kingswood was one of the first schools in the area to adopt the Eco-schools project and be awarded its Green Flag. It has since begun outreach work with other local schools, including Batheaston Junior School. The school was awarded its third Green Flag in 2010.

== Kingswood-Oxford School ==
George Nicholson, an alumnus of Kingswood School, Bath, established a school for boys of the same name in West Hartford, Connecticut in 1916. This new institution inherited some of the traditions of its counterpart in Bath, including the School's crest, motto, colours and distinctive symbol, the Wyvern. In 1969 the school merged with the Oxford School for girls into the new Kingswood-Oxford School.

== Kingswood College, Kandy ==
Kingswood College in Kandy, Sri Lanka, established in 1891 by Sir Louis Edmund Blaze, also draws inspiration from Kingswood School in Bath, embracing the Methodist tradition and fostering a long-standing legacy of faith, discipline, and education.

== Kingswood College, Grahamstown ==
Kingswood College in Grahamstown, South Africa, was founded in 1894 and derives its name and ideals from Kingswood school in Bath. They also use the same distinctive Wyvern crest and abide by the same Methodist ethos.

== Notable staff ==
- Thomas Hennell (artist and writer)

== Notable alumni ==
Former students of Kingswood School are known as old Kingswoodians. Notable former students include:

- Kenneth Beard (organist)
- David Beetham (political theorist and human rights campaigner)
- David Blow (biophysicist)
- Jeremy Bray (Labour politician, former Government Minister and Member of Parliament)
- Archie Bronson Outfit (rock band)
- Sir Ralph Kilner Brown (High Court judge 1970–1985, Brigadier)
- William Maclardie Bunting (hymn composer)
- Sir John Burnett (Principal and Vice-Chancellor of the University of Edinburgh)
- Roger Butlin (theatre set designer)
- Laurie Canter (Golfer)
- Howard Clark (Chair of War Resisters' International)
- Professor Hugh Clegg (industrial relations scholar)
- Richard Cork (art historian and broadcaster)
- John Colley (epidemiologist and professor of public health)
- Sir Kenneth Cross (Air Chief Marshal, Air Officer Commander-in-Chief Bomber Command)
- R.N. Currey (poet)
- Tim Curry (actor, singer and composer)
- Hugh Sykes Davies (poet, novelist, communist)
- Arthur Lee Dixon (mathematician and academic)
- Nicholas Maxted Fenn (diplomat)
- Alan Fitch (Labour politician)
- Rev Joseph Horner Fletcher (founding Principal Wesley College, Auckland and President, Newington College)
- Antony Flew (philosopher)
- Sir Richard Foster (museum director)
- William Ralph Boyce Gibson (Australian philosopher)
- Vice Admiral Sir Paul Haddacks (Lieutenant Governor of the Isle of Man)
- Daisy Head (actress)
- Emily Head (actress)
- Sir John Holford (Royal Navy Medical Officer)
- Jesse Honey (BBC Mastermind Champion 2010, World Quiz Champion 2012)
- William George Horner (mathematician, headmaster)
- Lynton Lamb (Illustrator)
- Nicholas Le Prevost, actor
- David Lomax, television Journalist
- Arthur Lucas (headmaster Newington College and Sydney Grammar School, and Professor of Mathematics University of Tasmania)
- Francis Sowerby Macaulay (mathematician)
- Alexander McAulay (mathematician and physicist)
- Rev James Egan Moulton (founding headmaster Newington College and Tupou College, and President, Newington College)
- John Fletcher Moulton (politician, weapon designer, Lord Justice)
- Sir Robert William Perks, 1st Baronet, Liberal Member of Parliament
- George Perry-Smith (restaurateur)
- Rev Dr Charles Prescott (founding headmaster Wesleyan Ladies College, and headmaster and President, Newington College)
- Roger Saul (founder of the fashion brand Mulberry)
- Gilbert Granville Sharp, Justice of the Supreme Court of Ghana (1960–1962)
- Johann Wilhelm Ernst Sommer (German Methodist bishop)
- E.P. Thompson (Marxist historian and peace activist, author of The Making of the English Working Class (1963), co-founder of the scholarly journals Past and Present and New Left Review)
- Anthony Thwaite (poet, critic, and editor of Philip Larkin)
- Jane Tranter (former Head of Drama, Comedy and Film at the BBC)
- J.O. Urmson (philosopher and classicist)
- Phil Wang (comedian)
- Jabez Waterhouse (Methodist legislator in Australia)
- George Waterhouse (Premier of New Zealand 1872–1873, Premier of South Australia 1861–1863)
- Joseph Waterhouse (Methodist minister and missionary in Fiji)
- Arthur Way (scholar, translator, headmaster of Wesley College Melbourne)
- Thomas Ebenezer Webb (author, translator, fellow of Trinity College Dublin)
- David M. Wilson (director of the British Museum from 1977 to 1992)
- Peter Wollen (film theorist and filmmaker)
- Hugh Wright (schoolmaster and educationalist)

=== Victoria Cross holders ===
Two Old Kingswoodians have been awarded the Victoria Cross:

- William Job Maillard (1863–1903), Staff Surgeon, Royal Navy
- Hardy Falconer Parsons (1897–1917), Second Lieutenant, The Gloucestershire Regiment

== See also ==
- Robson Fisher, a master at the school who went on to be headmaster of Bryanston School
- Thomas Ferens, politician, philanthropist and industrialist who donated £30,000 to the school in 1924 (now worth almost £2.3 million) towards the construction of the Ferens building at the school
- Katherine Jenkins, a Welsh singer and songwriter, undertook a music course at Kingswood as a child and said that the experience was "one of the things which made me decide to become a singer"

== Literature ==
- Hastling, A.H.L.; W. Addington Willis; W.P. Workman, The History of Kingswood School (1898)
- A. G. Ives, Kingswood School in Wesley's Day and Since (1970)
- John Walsh (ed.), A.B. Sackett: A Memoir (1979)
- Gary Best, Continuity and Change, Kingswood School through the Ages (1998)
