= Diana Golden =

Diana Golden may refer to:

- Diana Golden (skier)
- Diana Golden (actress)
