= Robert Waterhouse =

Robert Waterhouse may refer to:

- Robert Brian Waterhouse, American convicted murderer
- Robert Waterhouse (MP) for Aldborough in 1584
- Robert Waterhouse (bookmaker)
