= George Waterhouse (politician) =

British colonial politician (1824–1906)

The Right Honourable George Waterhouse
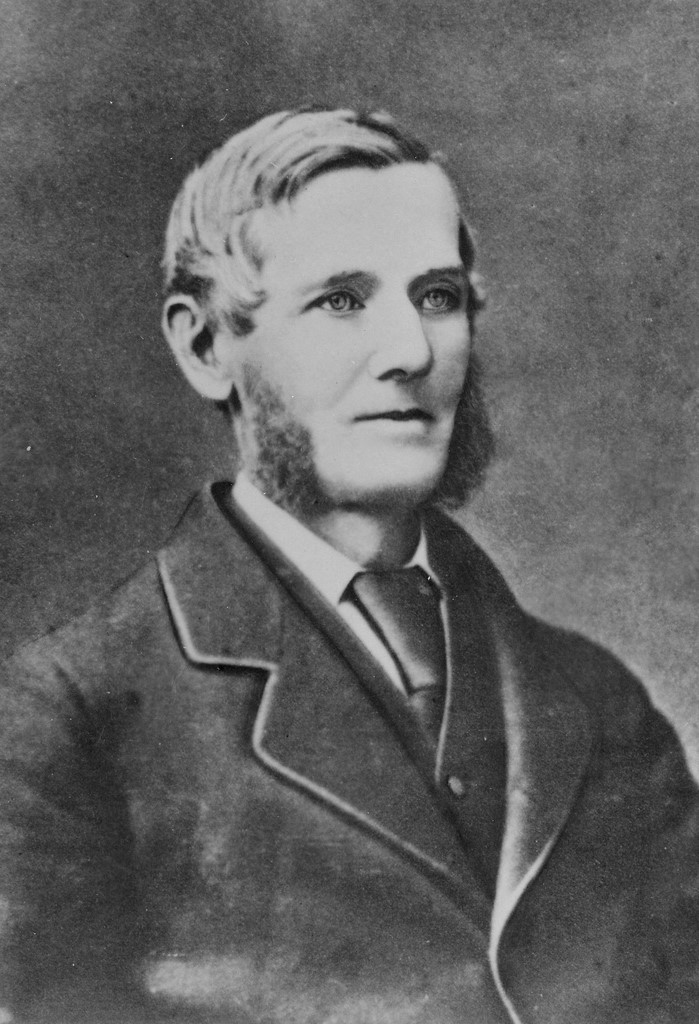

7th Premier of New Zealand
- In office 11 October 1872 – 3 March 1873
- Monarch: Victoria
- Governor: George Grey; George Bowen
- Preceded by: Edward Stafford
- Succeeded by: William Fox

Speaker of the New Zealand Legislative Council
- In office 22 April 1887 – 21 September 1887
- Preceded by: William Fitzherbert
- Succeeded by: William Fitzherbert

Member of the Legislative Council of New Zealand
- In office 13 May 1870 – 30 June 1890

Premier of South Australia
- In office 8 October 1861 – 3 July 1863
- Monarch: Victoria
- Governor: Sir Richard MacDonnell; Sir Dominick Daly
- Preceded by: Thomas Reynolds
- Succeeded by: Francis Dutton

Member of the Parliament of South Australia
- In office 3 April 1860 – 7 December 1864
- Constituency: State-at-large
- In office 26 February 1857 – 8 September 1857
- Preceded by: seat established
- Succeeded by: Lavington Glyde
- Constituency: East Torrens
- In office 3 July 1851 – 3 June 1854
- Constituency: East Torrens

Personal details
- Born: 6 April 1824 Penzance, Cornwall, United Kingdom
- Died: 6 August 1906 (aged 82) Torquay, Devon, England
- Party: None
- Spouse: Lydia Giles
- Children: 2 (adopted)
- Parent(s): John Waterhouse; Jane Beadnell Skipsey
- Relatives: Jabez Waterhouse (brother); Joseph Waterhouse (brother); John Waterhouse (nephew); Walter Waterhouse (great nephew)
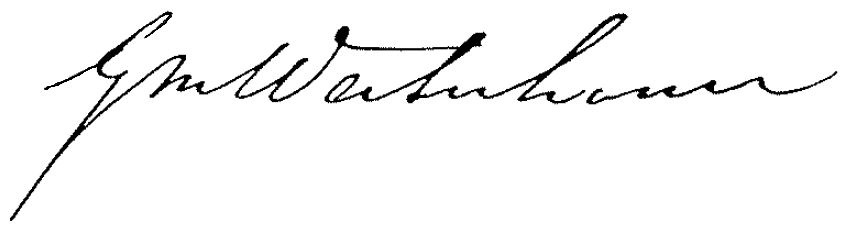
- Signature

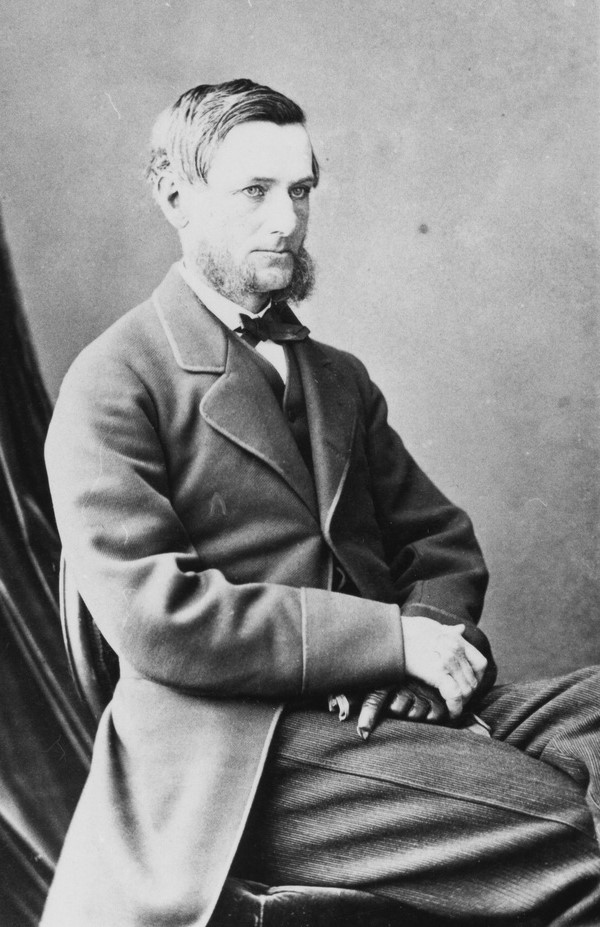

George Marsden Waterhouse (6 April 1824 – 6 August 1906) was a Premier of South Australia from 8 October 1861 until 3 July 1863 and the seventh premier of New Zealand from 11 October 1872 to 3 March 1873.

== Early life ==
George Waterhouse's father, Rev John Waterhouse, was general superintendent of the Wesleyan Missions in Australia and Polynesia.

== Australia ==
Waterhouse was aged 15 when his family migrated in 1839, initially to Hobart. Four years later he moved to Adelaide and set up business as a merchant.

Waterhouse was first elected to parliament in the electoral district of East Torrens in the colony of South Australia in August 1851. He resigned 3 years later, was elected again in 1857 but resigned again soon after.

Waterhouse supported economic development of the colony through free trade and was elected to the South Australian Legislative Council again in 1860, where he advocated uniform tariffs for Australia. He was chief secretary in the First Reynolds Ministry from May 1860 to February 1861. After Reynolds ended his term as Premier in 1861, Waterhouse formed a government with the intention of finalising a motion in relation to Justice Benjamin Boothby, a judge in the Supreme Court of South Australia who was causing difficulties by objecting to the legitimacy of the Appeals Court under the new Constitution. Waterhouse resigned his ministry after this task was completed, but was persuaded to reform another government, which lasted until July 1863 before collapsing in the face of accusations of financial irregularities and alleged misappropriation of funds.

== New Zealand ==
Waterhouse migrated to New Zealand in 1869 and on 13 May 1870 was appointed to the New Zealand Legislative Council. He remained a Legislative Council member until his resignation on 30 June 1890.

== Retirement in England ==
Waterhouse fell into ill-health and retired to England in 1889, and died at Torquay, Devon on 6 August 1906.

Despite this, Waterhouse never received a knighthood or a peerage for his services in governing two colonies.

== Personal ==
He married Lydia Giles (1827 – 25 January 1910), a daughter of William Giles, on 5 July 1848. Fanny, one of their two adopted daughters, married William Fitzherbert in 1875.

Parliament of South Australia
New district	Member of Parliament for East Torrens; 1857; Served alongside: Charles Bonney	Succeeded by Lavington Glyde
Political offices
Preceded by William Younghusband	Chief Secretary of South Australia; 1860–1861	Succeeded by John Morphett
Preceded by Thomas Reynolds	Premier of South Australia; 1861–1863	Succeeded by Francis Dutton
Preceded by John Morphett	Chief Secretary of South Australia; 1861–1863	Succeeded by John Hart
New Zealand Parliament
Appointed	Member of the New Zealand Legislative Council; 1870–1890; Served alongside: Multiple Members	Appointed
Political offices
Preceded by Edward Stafford	Premier of New Zealand; 1872–1873	Succeeded by William Fox
Preceded by William Fitzherbert	Speaker of the New Zealand Legislative Council; 1887	Succeeded by William Fitzherbert
