= Wilfred Eade Agar =

Anglo-Australian zoologist

Agar in May 1935.

Wilfred Eade Agar (27 April 1882 – 14 July 1951) was an Anglo-Australian zoologist and eugenicist.

Agar was born in Wimbledon, England. He was educated at Sedbergh School, Yorkshire, and at King's College, Cambridge, where he read zoology. He served at Gallipoli in World War I.

In 1919, he accepted the chair of zoology at the University of Melbourne; his notable projects concerned marsupial chromosomes and inheritance in cattle. He successfully challenged the Lamarckian findings of William McDougall relating to the inheritance of the effects of training in rats.

In 1938 Agar was elected president of the Eugenics Society of Victoria. He said "it was a disastrous state of affairs that size of families was usually in inverse ratio to intelligence."

Agar was awarded the Clarke Medal by the Royal Society of New South Wales in 1944 and elected a Foreign Member of the Royal Society.

Agar Street in the Canberra suburb of Bruce was dedicated in his name. The Agar lecture theatre at the University of Melbourne is named after him.

Agar was the author of the book A Contribution to the Theory of the Living Organism (1943). The book was based on the system of Whitehead's philosophy of the organism and argued for a form panpsychism.

== Publications ==
- Experiments on Inheritance in Parthenogenesis (1914)
- Cytology: With Special Reference to the Metazoan Nucleus (1920)
- Agar, W.E. (1932), "A Review of some Experiments Currently Quoted as Evidence of the Inheritance of Acquired Characters", The Australian Journal of Experimental Biology and Medical Science, Vol.9, No.1, (January 1932), pp. 179-190.
- Science and Human Welfare (1943)
- A Contribution to the Theory of the Living Organism (1943, 1951)

Awards
Preceded by Walter Lawry Waterhouse	Clarke Medal; 1944	Succeeded by Noel Benson
