= Waterhouses =

Waterhouses may refer to:

- Waterhouses, County Durham
  - Waterhouses (County Durham) railway station
- Waterhouses, Staffordshire
  - Waterhouses (Staffordshire) railway station

== See also ==
- Waterhouse (disambiguation)
