= Johann Wilhelm Ernst Sommer =

Johann Wilhelm Ernst Sommer (31 March 1881 – 15 October 1952) was a bishop of the Methodist Church, elected in 1946 for service in Germany.

== Birth and family ==
Johann was born 31 March 1881 in Stuttgart, Germany, of German and English ancestry. He was the eldest son of The Reverend Johann Jakob Sommer (1850-1925), a Methodist preacher who was arrested and reprimanded for persistent preaching in public places, and Zillah Elizabeth Barratt (1848-1935).

He was educated in Germany, at Kingswood School, Bath, and Caius College, Cambridge, in England, and in Switzerland. From 1906 until 1912 he was a Methodist missionary in the Ottoman Empire. He also attended Methodist Conferences in Lausanne (1927) and in Edinburgh (1937). He was a member of the Executive Committee of the Free Church Council of Germany. During World War II, his family lived in the basement of their looted home, and eight times he was called before the Gestapo for questioning.

== Episcopal ministry ==
Johann was elected to the episcopacy by the Germany Central Conference of the Methodist Church, and consecrated by Bishop R.J. Wade, assisted by Bishops P.N. Garber and Theodor Arvidson. Bishop Sommer was assigned to the Frankfort-on-Main Episcopal Area (which included the Central, Northeast, Northwest, South and Southwest Germany Annual Conferences).

Bishop Sommer died 15 October 1952 in Zurich, Switzerland. Bishop Sommer's son, Ernst, was elected to the episcopacy in 1968.

== See also ==
- List of bishops of the United Methodist Church
