= Steven R. Kidd =

Steven R. Kidd (1911, Chicago, Illinois – 1987), known to friends and students as Joe Kidd, was an American illustrator. He illustrated for various books and magazines and for many years was an illustrator for the New York Daily News. He taught fine art illustration at the Art Students League of New York. Kidd's illustrations also appeared in the Sunday Coloroto magazine.

== Career highlights ==
He left Chicago at 17 to begin work for the New York Daily News and other well-known publications. Christmas and the festive season was almost a motif of Kidd's. His works reflect the fascination he had for Christmas scenes. His illustrations of Christmas scenes are usually his best works, which he drew with utmost care and reverence. Kidd's special gift was in capturing ordinary scenes. He also drew a series of behind-the-scenes illustrations of Canadian lumberjacks in the forests and lumberyards. Memorable pieces include, "Night Before Christmas", "Gift of the Magi", and "Casey At The Bat", which he donated to the Baseball Hall of Fame. His work is also in the permanent collections of the Smithsonian Institution, the Illustrators Club, and the Harvey Dunn Museum.

His work is featured in "The Illustrator in America" and Charles Waterhouse's "Illustrations in Black, White and Gray" STEVEN R. KIDD: A Note About The Artist

== Awards ==
Kidd won many awards and prizes, was a war artist in Korea and had his work hung in the White House, and taught at the Art Students League in New York.

== Personal life ==
Known for his fun-loving, easy going spirit, artist Kidd was often seen walking his dogs around the Hudson River Valley hills. Sporting his trademark bow tie, hat, and walking stick (usually a tree branch), Mr. Kidd would sit on a rock and sketch into the blue hours. The evening shadows in this area have been known to play tricks, leading men astray from the path home - and Mr. Kidd got good and lost, many times!

Moving to the Hudson River Valley area in 1948, he was a deacon of the Union Church of Pocantico Hills, where many of his works are displayed among the famous Chagall windows and Henri Matisse's Rosette. He is buried alongside Maurine, his wife of more than 40 years, on a sloping hill in Sleepy Hollow Cemetery which overlooks the bridge where Ichabod met his fate.
