= Flo Hyman Award =

The Flo Hyman Memorial Award was conferred annually between 1987 and 2004 by the Women's Sports Foundation in Washington, D.C., United States, on the organization's National Girls and Women in Sports Day to the female sportsperson, irrespective of nationality or sport contested, adjudged to have capture[d] [best]...the dignity, spirit, and commitment to excellence of American indoor volleyballer Flo Hyman, an advocate for gender equality in sport and for the passage of Civil Rights Restoration Act of 1988 who died suddenly and unexpectedly in January 1986. The award was given with respect both to athletic performance and to charitable activism, especially in the context of [increasing] sports opportunities for all girls and women.

== List of winners ==
| Year | Recipient | Nationality | Sport contested | Ref |
|---|---|---|---|---|
| 1987 | Martina Navratilova | United States | Tennis | |
| 1988 | Jackie Joyner-Kersee | United States | Athletics | |
| 1989 | Evelyn Ashford | United States | Athletics | |
| 1990 | Chris Evert | United States | Tennis | |
| 1991 | Diana Golden-Brosnihan | United States | Paralympic alpine skiing | |
| 1992 | Nancy Lopez | United States | Golf | |
| 1993 | Lynette Woodard | United States | Basketball | |
| 1994 | Patty Sheehan | United States | Golf | |
| 1995 | Mary Lou Retton | United States | Artistic gymnastics | |
| 1996 | Donna de Varona | United States | Swimming | |
| 1997 | Billie Jean King | United States | Tennis | |
| 1998 | Nadia Comăneci | Romania | Artistic gymnastics | |
| 1999 | Bonnie Blair | United States | Speedskating | |
| 2000 | Monica Seles | United States | Tennis | |
| 2001 | Lisa Leslie | United States | Basketball | |
| 2002 | Dot Richardson | United States | Softball | |
| 2003 | Nawal El Moutawakel | Morocco | Athletics | |
| 2004 | Kristi Yamaguchi | United States | Figure skating | |

== See also ==
- List of sports awards honoring women
- Arthur Ashe for Courage Award
- Laureus World Sports Awards
