= Edward Waterhouse =

English Chancellor of the Exchequer in Ireland

Sir Edward Waterhouse (1535–1591) was an English-born administrator in Ireland during the reign of Queen Elizabeth I. He was the first to hold the office of Chief Secretary for Ireland (from 1566 to 1567 and from 1568 to 1569), and served as Chancellor of the Exchequer of Ireland from 1586 to 1589. He represented and shared fully in the Protestant complexion of the English government in Ireland, and himself bore arms against the risings in Munster and elsewhere driven by the rivalries of the Butler and FitzGerald families and other factions. He contributed significantly to the successes of the English army in Ireland through his administration, and made important contributions to policy regarding the future of Ireland and its English plantations. A loyal servant of Sir Henry Sidney and friend of his son Sir Philip Sidney, he was on close and trusted terms with Sir Francis Walsingham as friend, agent and intelligencer, and with Walter Devereux, and managed the affairs of Robert Devereux in childhood after his father's death. In later years he worked closely with Sir John Perrot, and brought to near-completion his Treatise of Irelande as a template for that realm's reorganization and further plantation under English governance. His career may be traced through very numerous entries in the Calendar of State Papers for Ireland, in the context of the Elizabethan military campaigns.

== Family details ==
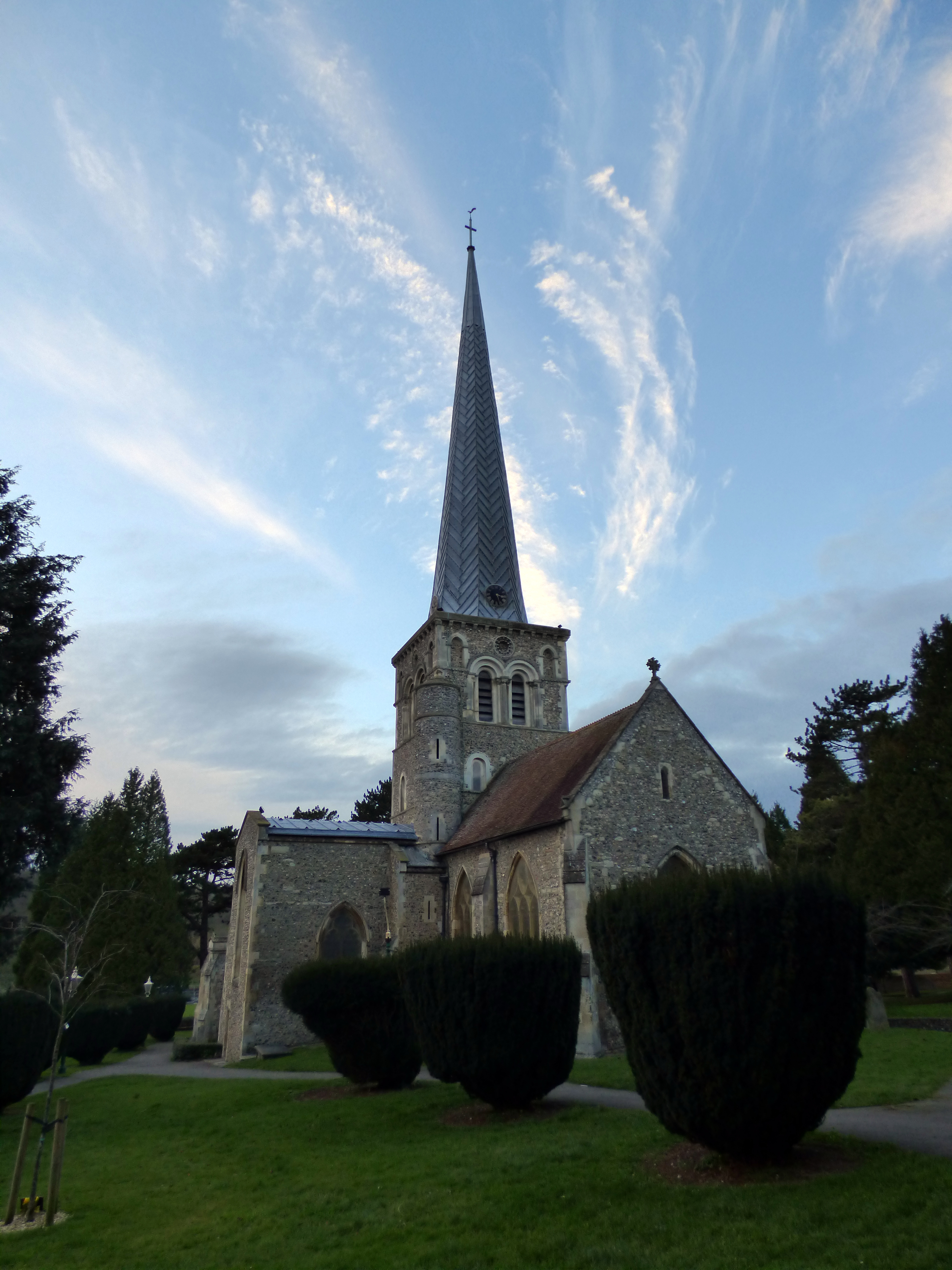
St Mary's, Hemel Hempstead

Edward Waterhouse was the fourth-born, but third surviving, of six sons of John Waterhouse (died 1558), of Hemel Hempstead, Hertfordshire, Auditor to King Henry VIII, and his wife Margaret Turner (died 1558/59), daughter of Henry Turner of Blunt's Hall, Little Wratting, Suffolk. John's brother Thomas Waterhouse (died 1557), "Gentleman-Priest" to King Henry, had been the rector of Ashridge Priory (the collegiate religious house of Boni Homines) elected 1529, and of Quainton in Buckinghamshire. After the Dissolution, the former Ashridge Priory became the residence of Princess Elizabeth until her arrest in 1554. Thomas the priest asked to be buried near his mother at St Mary's Church, Hemel Hempstead: his brass is lost, but was figured by Sylvanus Morgan. John entertained King Henry at Hemel, who at his request incorporated the Vill under a Bailiff, granting its seal, weekly markets and annual fair, etc.

The family home at that time was The Bury, the capital manorial seat, of Helmstedbury, a former monastic possession of Ashridge Priory's: a long lease having been granted in 1535 by Thomas Waterhouse, as rector, to his brother John and to his nephew Richard Combes, with right to occupy, a subsequent royal grant was made to Combes in 1540. Some footings can be seen in Gadebridge Park at Hemel Hempstead, between the Norman church and the brick mansion of 1790 now called "The Bury". The stated association of John with the manor of Whitchurch, Buckinghamshire near Quainton (as shown in a Harleian pedigree), appertains correctly to his son John Waterhouse (died 1583), Edward's eldest brother, who purchased that manor in 1581 from Edward de Vere, 17th Earl of Oxford, and settled it upon his son Thomas.

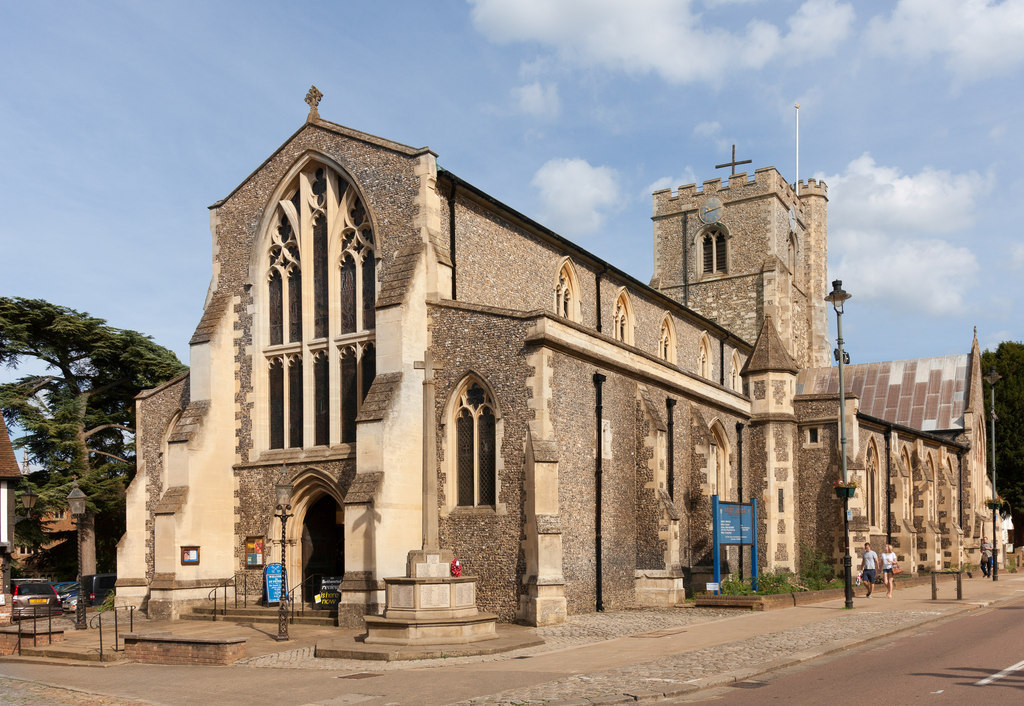
St Peter's, Berkhamsted

According to Edward's grand-nephew (Fuller's informant), the King met Edward in his boyhood and foretold that "he would be the crown of them all, and a man of great honour and wisdom, fit for the service of princes". He was educated at the University of Oxford, to which he was admitted at the age of twelve: there he shone in the arts of oratory and poetry, before his entry into the Court where he devoted himself to politics and statecraft.

Following his parents' deaths in 1558-1559, although it is clear from his mother's will that his father was buried at Watford, beside whom she wished to lie, their memorial was set up in St Peter's church, Berkhamsted. (Soon afterwards the old mediaeval mansion at The Bury was demolished and a new Bury House was built by the kindred Combe family, which stood until 1790.) A corner of Berkhamsted church became the family chapel: Edward's brothers Thomas (died 1600) (and his wife Mary née Kirkby), who lived in that town, and John (of Whitchurch), and others of the Waterhouse family, were buried there.

== Career ==
=== Chief Secretary for Ireland ===
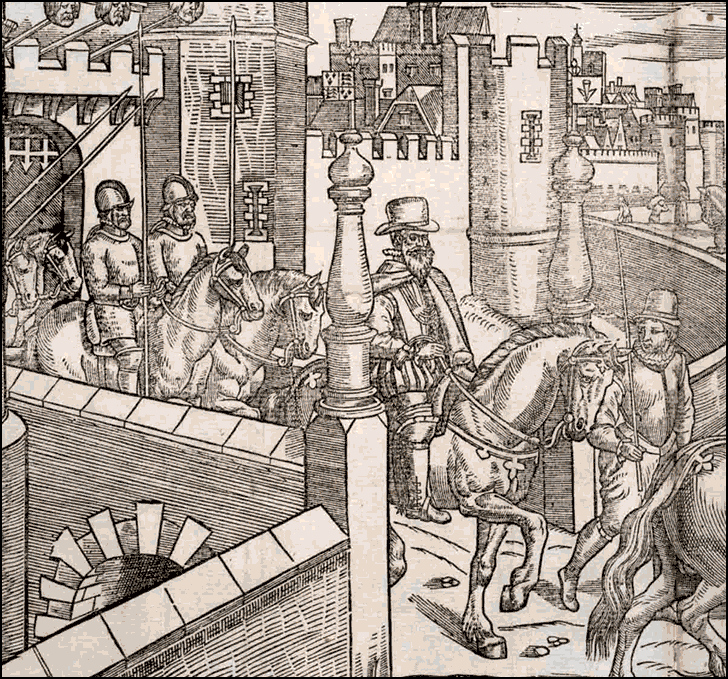
Sir Henry Sidney at Dublin (woodcut 1581). The first patron.

Spending several years in sworn service in the household of Princess Elizabeth, Edward Waterhouse became attached to the sphere of Sir Henry Sidney (1529-1586). In 1565 he accompanied Sidney to Ireland as private secretary on his first term as Lord Deputy of Ireland, 1565-1571, developing a loyal friendship with him and being employed in many confidential transactions. He was immediately appointed clerk of the Castle Chamber at Dublin (held from 1566 to 1569), and was granted a lease of land in Monasterevin in County Kildare. In 1570 he was instrumental in obtaining a charter for the town of Carrickfergus, of which he was made a freeman.

=== Service to Walter Devereux ===
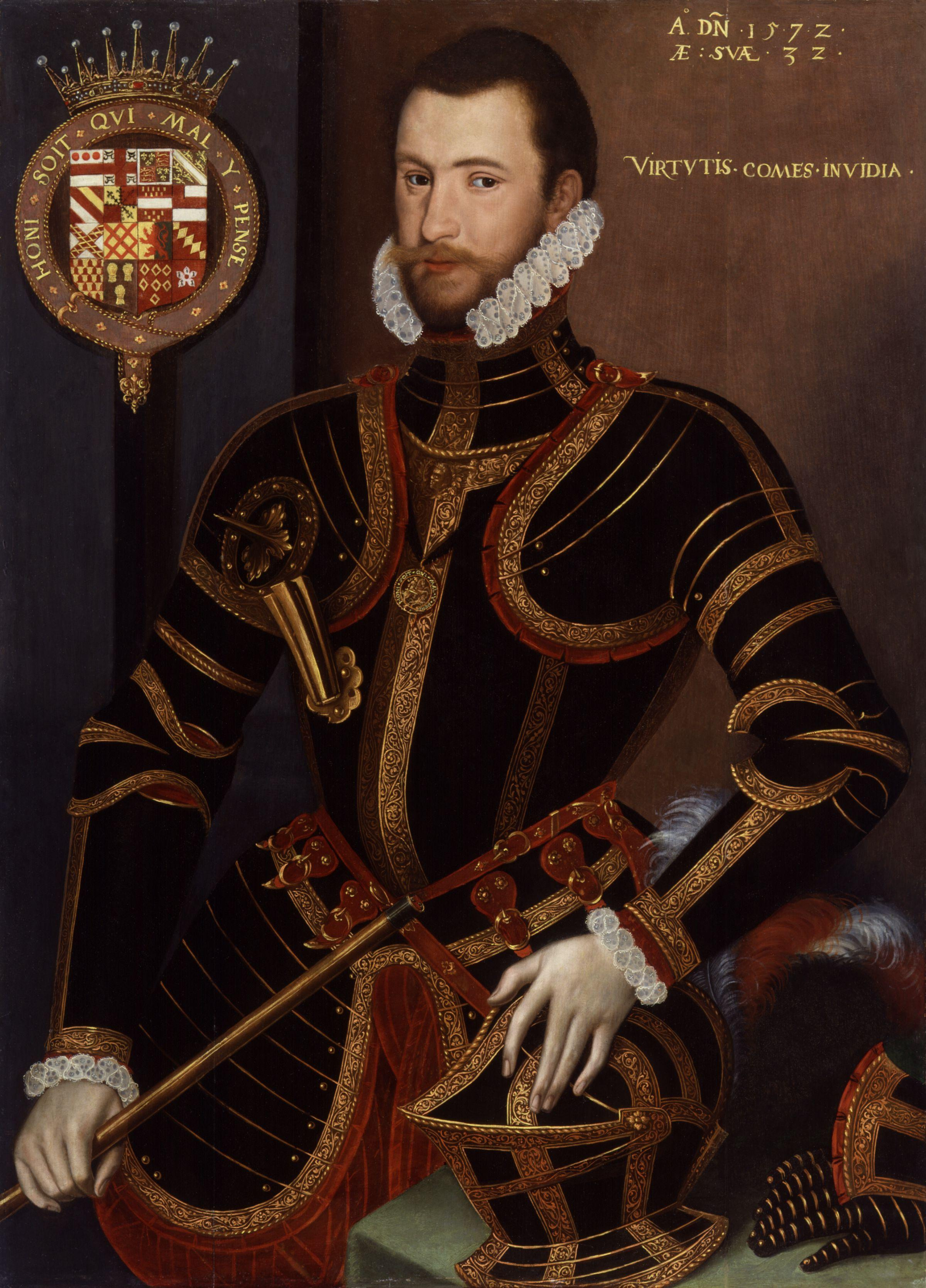
Walter Devereux, 1st Earl of Essex. The second patron.

Having left Ireland in 1570, during the First Desmond Rebellion against the further extension of English government, Waterhouse remained absent at the 1571 succession of Sir William FitzWilliam as Lord Deputy, until in 1573 he assisted Walter Devereux, 1st Earl of Essex in his prepensed attempt to establish plantation in County Antrim. He urged the reappointment of Sidney, and strongly advocated to Francis Walsingham, the English Secretary of State, that Essex, untainted by the native factional interests, was the right man (given adequate military resources) to complete the conquest of Ireland out of Ulster. This venture, disliked by FitzWilliam, kept Waterhouse busy in Dublin in 1574 arranging army provisions. In that year he advocated that even the most senior ecclesastical appointments should be given to military men, "for here is scarce any sign of religion, nor no room for justice, till the sword hath made a way for the law."

To this period belongs Waterhouse's manuscript policy document on Means to quiet the northern part of Ulster, in which he proposed the development of a close economic interdependence between north-western England, through trade in minerals and coals out of Newcastle, and the reciprocal development of Irish fisheries, as a means to counteract the unsettling incursions of the Scots upon northern Ulster. One of the early drafts of the Treatise of Irelande (on which he is thought to have worked over the following ten years) survives in his handwriting.

With Sidney's reappointment in 1575, he returned to his position as Secretary and, despite being accused of corruption, was awarded a daily pension of ten shillings in June 1576. He had won the trust of the Earl of Essex, often representing him at Court, and attended the earl's deathbed in September 1576. In his moving account of those events, he tells how the dying earl wept as he said "My good Nedd, thou arte [the] faiethfullest that ever I knewe, and the frendliest and honestest". Waterhouse had some charge of the affairs of Robert Devereux (then aged 10), the future 2nd Earl, and he wrote to Sidney describing the support of the queen and nobles towards the boy. The sermon preached at the earl's funeral, published together with various epitaphs, was prefixed by an Epistle by Waterhouse addressed to Robert Devereux holding up to him the example of his father, which epistle was reprinted in full by Raphael Holinshed in the 1577 edition of his Chronicle. The second son of Sir Nicholas White also came into his care.

=== Missions ===
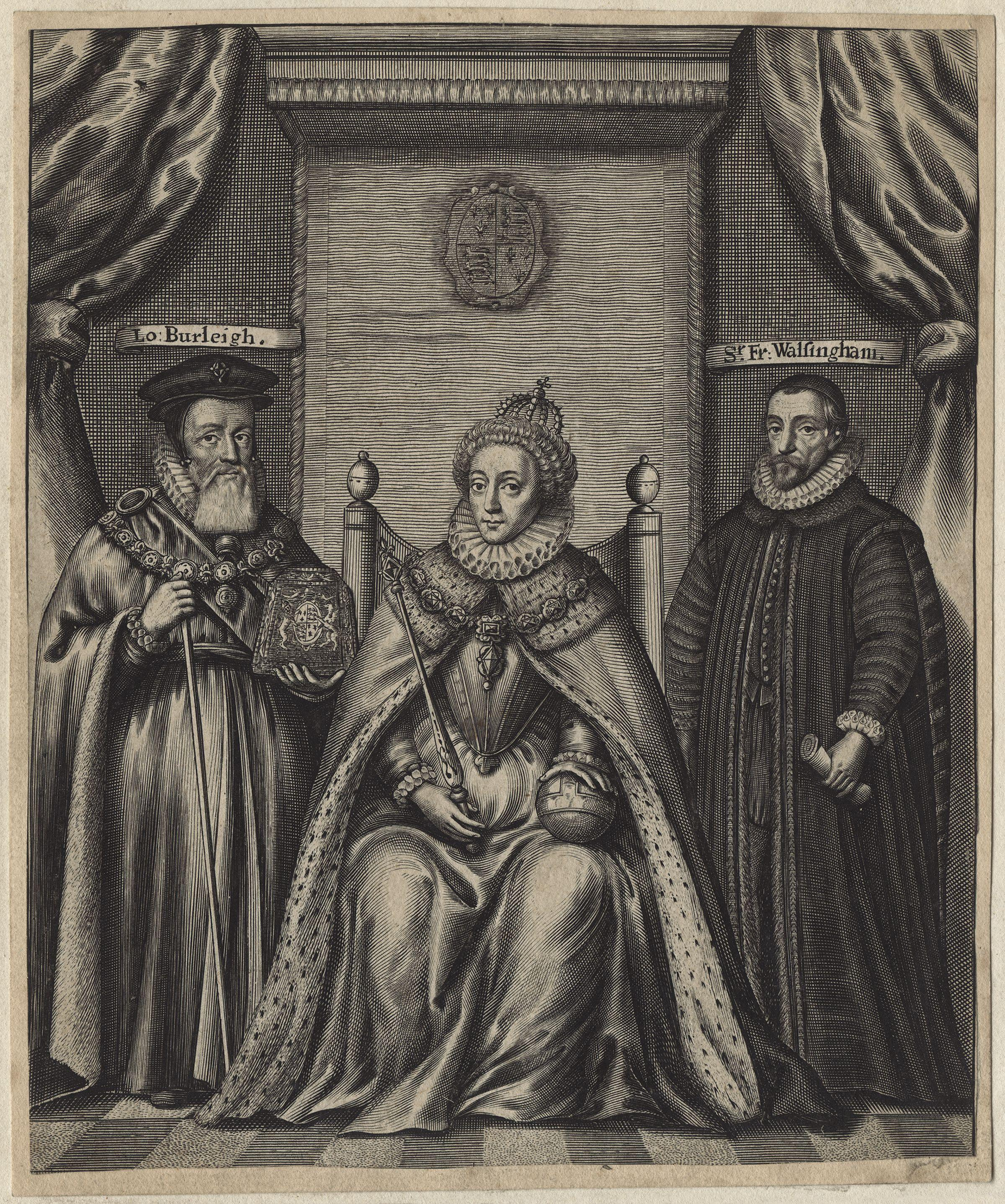
The Queen, with Burghley and Walsingham

Waterhouse continued work on Sidney's behalf, often representing causes in London. In 1576-77 he made great efforts to justify the much-resented tax (the "cess") for the upkeep of royal army garrisons within the Pale, but was strongly opposed by envoys of the Anglo-Irish gentry. Through the summer of 1577 in London he followed Sidney's detailed instructions, working with Walsingham over Irish matters. Following his divorce (by her own consent) from his first wife, Elizabeth Villiers, in March 1577/78, he was sent to England again on official business with further instructions in May 1578, before Sidney's removal as Lord Deputy later in the year. Waterhouse continued as secretary and commissioner for the government in Ireland under Sir William Drury. Over the next two years he accumulated further official appointments, notably as Customs officer for wines in Irish ports in February 1579, and as Receiver of casual profits for the Crown, and Exchequer Commissioner of the army, in June 1579: at the same time his pension was re-granted for life.

Having such an official and active role in the military response to the Second Desmond Rebellion, at the time of Drury's death in October 1579 he was appointed to the Privy Council of Ireland. These appointments coincided with the interim administration of Sir William Pelham, Lord Justice of Ireland, whose ruthless operations held in check the risings in Munster and Meath. Fuller effused, "when many of the Privy Council, terrified with the greatness of the Earl of Desmond, durst not subscribe the instrument [of 1579] wherein he was proclaimed Traitor; Sir Edward among some others boldly signed the same (disavowing his, and all treasons against his Prince and Country)..." In their wake, having served in Munster, Waterhouse was appointed (in perpetuity) Water Bailiff of the River Shannon (from Leitrim down to Limerick) in June 1580 - to be overseen from the Connaught Tower, a stronghold in the outer defences of Athlone Castle - and for other headquarters he had the lease of lands of Pierston and elsewhere in co. Meath, in 1580, and a grant of the manor and castle of Downasse (near Limerick) in summer 1582.

=== Under Wallop and Loftus ===
Following the recall of Lord Arthur Grey (Lord Deputy, 1580-1582), while Sir Henry Wallop and Archbishop Adam Loftus had administration as Lords Justices of Ireland, intrigues raised the Queen's suspicions over the favours received by Waterhouse. Summoned to London in 1582 to give an account of himself, Elizabeth was soon won over by his influential friends and personal charm. His office of bailiff of the Shannon was however surrendered and regranted for term of life only, not in perpetuity. Irish Catholics have remembered Waterhouse (with Geoffrey Fenton) as the man who tortured Dermot O'Hurley, the elective Archbishop of Cashel, by roasting his feet in the fire, and brought about his martyrdom in attempting to make him renounce the Roman Catholic faith. The English narrative refers rather to O'Hurley's interrogation under suspicion not of recusancy for itself, but of complicity in the contemplation of high treason against the English monarch. On 20 June 1584, O'Hurley, the flesh already stripped from his legs and feet, was hanged: this revolting exhibition was memorialized in 1992 by Pope John Paul II in the beatification of the Blessed Dermot O'Hurley.

=== Service to Sir John Perrot ===
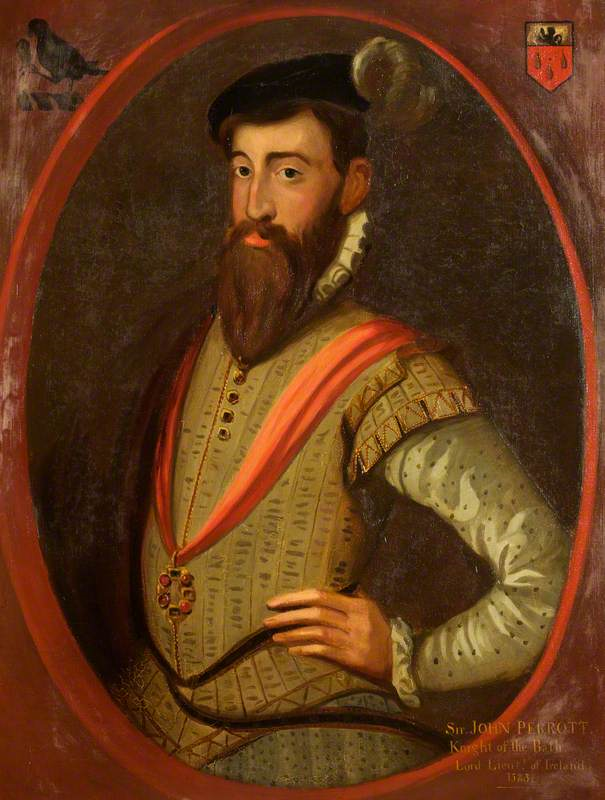
Sir John Perrot, Lord Deputy 1584-1588. The third patron.

On the very day of O'Hurley's execution, Waterhouse was knighted by Sir John Perrot inside Christ Church Cathedral, Dublin, ostensibly because Waterhouse "dispended yearly more than a thousand marks." It was in Sir John Perrot, as Lord Deputy 1584-1588, that Waterhouse found his new patron: Fuller remarked that Sir John "so valued his counsel, that in state affairs he would do nothing without him."

He represented Carrickfergus constituency in the Irish Parliament in 1585. In the summer of that year his titles and lands in Thomond and the Castle of Downasseye were confirmed in Perrot's tripartite indenture concerning the divisions of the Thomond country. At this time Waterhouse is thought to have worked up the latest and most detailed extant form of The Treatise of Irelande (1586), an evolved manuscript tract of some 25,000 words never fully completed, drawing upon, or listing, all the many known treatises discussing Tudor policy for the governance and re-formation of Ireland. "He was highly instrumental in modelling the Kingdome of Ireland into shires as they now are", commented Fuller. His long acquaintance with the condition of Ulster gives that part of his study particular interest, while his subdivisions and analyses of the provinces and counties are, by comparison with predecessors, considered "strikingly modern" in recent scholarship. While Waterhouse was supportive of, and instrumental in, the militarized expansion of Tudor government, plantation and religious policy in Ireland which advanced strongly during the 1570s, he advocated considered and approved courses in a field open to disparate ambitions.

=== Chancellor of the Irish Exchequer ===
In 1586 Waterhouse was appointed Chancellor of the Exchequer of Ireland, handing over to Sir George Clive in October 1589. Thomas Molyneux, who later succeeded to the same office, had formerly been servant to Sir Edward. Waterhouse was among the mourners at the funeral procession for Sir Philip Sidney in February 1586/1587, and is figured among the fifteen "Knights of the kyndred and frends" in Thomas Lant's contemporary depiction of the mourner procession. In April 1587 he suggested that the Earl of Essex might be offered command of a garrison in Ireland, with the incentive of renewing his father's celebrated example there: however, under a similar ambition the earl turned his attention away to the Continent, and to the defence of Sluis in Flanders.

Having long complained of his "weak body", he retired to his estate at Woodchurch in Kent, which he had acquired through his last marriage. He returned briefly and somewhat unwillingly to Ireland in 1590, but came back again to Kent as new factions hostile to Sir John Perrot took power and prepared his downfall. Waterhouse died at Woodchurch aged 55, in 1591, and was buried in the church there with an inscribed altar-tomb for his own memorial.

== Marriages ==
Waterhouse, who had no children of his own, was married three times:

- First, he married Elizabeth (daughter of George Villiers of Brooksby Hall, Leicestershire and Joan Harrington), from whom he was divorced in 1578. According to Lipscomb, she had been very young at the time of her marriage, and consented to the divorce, which was confirmed on March 29 1578 by a Royal Commission appointed to consider an Appeal made against it.
- Secondly, he married Margaret Spilman (c. 1549-1587), daughter of Thomas Spilman of Great Chart, Kent. who died in 1587. Margaret was buried in St Peter's church in Berkhamsted, where Edward left to his brother Thomas ("whoe hath bounde me from my youthe with contynewall kyndenes") money and instructions for a memorial "to her Christian and faithfull end in the Lord, her good Desertes in the world and her dutifull Love to me". The wall monument included an alabaster figure of a kneeling lady, and showed the Waterhouse and Spilman arms impaled. There is an inscription to the "worthie ladie Dame Margaret Waterhouse", "in memory of whose virtues and his dearest love" Sir Edward has caused it to be erected, showing not only that she died on 5 July 1587 aged 39, but also that he died on 13 October [1591, year omitted], "and lieth buried with his last wife Dame Debora at the Mannor of Woodechurch in Kent". The inscription, at least, ought therefore to be no older than 1611, more than a decade after the death of Thomas Waterhouse.
- His third and last wife was Debora (daughter of Thomas Whetenhall, and widow of Martin Harlakinden (died 1584) of Woodchurch), who survived him: she died in 1611. Debora had a daughter, also Debora, by her previous husband, and both are mentioned in the brass memorial to Martin (1584) at Woodchurch, which also names her father Whetenhall. Waterhouse, in his will, gives some armorial plate cups to his step-daughter, and mentions his father-in-law Thomas Whetenhall as yet living. Sir Edward Waterhouse was buried at Woodchurch, among the Harlakenden memorials, where he had an altar-tomb with a restored brass shield and a marginal stone-cut inscription, 1591: according to the Berkhamsted inscription, Dame Debora Waterhouse "lieth buried" with him. The Harlakinden brasses were removed from their stone settings at Woodchurch, but some, including Martin's inscription of 1584, are still preserved separately.

=== Legacies ===
By his will, in the first place Waterhouse made over to his widow, for her lifetime, all the lands and livings settled upon her at their marriage, except for those in Thomond, which he had since sold to Sir Thomas Norreys. But she was to have the profit and use arising from a lease of St Sepulchre, Dublin, which he had bought from Messrs. Molyneux and another. Then after her death, lands and tenements granted to him by the late Archbishop of Armagh, at Baltray and (tithes at) Athboy, in County Meath, were to go, while the lease subsisted, to his brother Charles and to his eldest son Charles, as assured by the Earl of Huntingdon: in the same way the lease in the Manor of St Sepulchre was to come to his brother Thomas of Berkhamsted, and to his son, as similarly assured. To his nephews John and Thomas, sons of his late brother John Waterhouse of Whitchurch, were to pass his lands, woods and reservations in County Roscommon: and to Katherine Norton, whom Dame Margaret Waterhouse had brought up adoptively, and to whom he was godfather, should pass his house and land in Athlone near the castle, called Connaught Tower, and all the grounds he bought on the other side of the Shannon, in Westmeath, from the Earl of Clanricarde and from his late brother Lord Burcke of Leitrim. Waterhouse also mentions his lands in Leicestershire and his house in London.

- His brother Thomas Waterhouse of Berkhamsted (c. 1532-1600) was apparently a cloth merchant. He is mentioned several times as beneficiary and witness in the will of Dame Joan Laxton (née Kirkeby, c. 1498-1574), who (bearing the same arms) was presumably a near relation of his wife Marie Kirkeby (daughter of John of Nottinghamshire), and who stipulated that all the black cloth for her funeral should be bought from Thomas Waterhouse. He was also beneficiary and witness in the will (1579) of her daughter Dame Anne Lodge (née Luddington), wife of Sir Thomas Lodge, who appointed him ward to her son Henry Lodge during his minority.
- Edward Waterhouse, author of A Declaration of the State and Affaires of the Colony of Virginia (London 1622), was a son of the brother Thomas Waterhouse of Berkhamsted.
- Edward Waterhouse (FRS) (1619-1670), the heraldic author, was a grandson of the brother Thomas Waterhouse of Berkhamsted.

Political offices
First None recognised before	Chief Secretary for Ireland; 1566 – 1568/9	Succeeded by Edmund Tremayne
