= Peter Waterhouse =

Peter Waterhouse may refer to:

- Peter Waterhouse (writer) (born 1956), Austrian writer and translator
- Peter Waterhouse (scientist), Australian plant scientist
- Peter Waterhouse (military officer) (1779-1823), British military officer
