= George Waterhouse =

George Waterhouse may refer to:

- George Robert Waterhouse (1810–1888), British naturalist
- George Waterhouse (politician) (1824–1906), Premier of South Australia and Premier of New Zealand
- George Waterhouse (footballer) (1899–1931), Australian rules footballer
