= Charles Waterhouse =

Charles Waterhouse is the name of:

- Charles Owen Waterhouse (1843–1917), English entomologist
- Charles Waterhouse (artist) (1924–2013), American painter, illustrator and sculptor
- Charles Waterhouse (politician) (1893–1975), British Conservative member of parliament 1924–1945 and 1950–1957
- Charles Waterhouse (hotelier), founder of Deerhurst Resort
