= David Lomax (journalist) =

British journalist

David Richard Lomax (18 May 1938 – 5 September 2014) was a British television reporter and interviewer. He was best known for his contributions as a reporter to the BBC's Panorama current affairs series.

== Early life ==
He was born in Normanby, North Riding of Yorkshire and attended Kingswood School, Bath, Somerset. He was then called up for National Service in the Royal Air Force and served as a jet pilot achieving the rank of Pilot Officer. He graduated from Brasenose College, Oxford with a history degree.

== Career ==
Lomax obtained a BBC traineeship as a presenter and was a reporter on Nationwide from the late 1960s and also reported for other BBC current affairs programmes and election night broadcasts. His notable interviewees on Panorama included Idi Amin, Robert Mugabe and Steve Jobs of Apple Inc. who walked out of his interview. He also made a critical report for Newsnight about the Eurofighter Typhoon project. He was named journalist of the year in 1986 and retired to Dartmoor, Devon. He had previously lived for many years near Theale, in Berkshire, where among other activities he kept bees. For most of his life he was an avid sailor, and completed many cruises in Arctic waters, as well as an Atlantic crossing. He died aged 76 on 5 September 2014.
