= David Waterhouse =

David Waterhouse may refer to:

- David Waterhouse (Canadian football), see 1987 CFL draft
- David Waterhouse (MP) for Aldborough (UK Parliament constituency) and Berwick-upon-Tweed
