= George Perry-Smith =

George Perry-Smith (10 October 1922 – 1 October 2003) was a chef and restaurateur, who opened the Hole in the Wall restaurant in Bath and ran it for 20 years. He introduced into British restaurant culture menus that were radically different from the norm in the 1950s, in terms of both the nature of the food and the range of dishes available.

== Early life ==
George Perry Smith (he adopted the style Perry-Smith in adulthood) was born in Widnes, Lancashire, the son of a Methodist minister, whose changes of local appointments necessitated an unsettled life. Additionally, by the time he was 12 both his parents had died. He was brought up by an aunt who sent him to Kingswood School in Bath. He went up to St John's College, Cambridge, to read Modern Languages, but his studies were interrupted by World War II. As a conscientious objector, he joined the Friends Ambulance Unit. He was introduced to cooking by Eric Green, a fellow member of the FAU, during a week working in the nurses' kitchen of Middlesex Hospital.

He returned to college after the war, and then spent two years in Paris teaching at the Sorbonne, where his interest in French cuisine blossomed.

=== The Hole in the Wall Restaurant ===
Returning from France, Perry-Smith headed for Bath, and was employed teaching French at Kingswood School, but he did not enjoy it. When a cafe in Bath known as The Cellar, the entrance to which was through an old coal store, came on the market, Perry-Smith and his partner, Kit Hammond-Spencer, bought it and opened a restaurant. US military clientele had nicknamed it The Hole in the Wall, and the name stuck.

He had no formal culinary training, but did have a natural talent for cooking. Taking inspiration from domestic cookery books, he developed many of his own recipes, but was also keen to follow the suggestions of the influential food writer Elizabeth David. Perry-Smith developed a drive for uncompromising excellence and was always anxious to buy fresh ingredients from local suppliers. He became widely acknowledged as the father of the best of post-war English cooking.

== Later life ==
Perry-Smith sold the Hole in the Wall in 1972, tired of the attention it attracted. After the sale of The Hole he spent a short period in Bristol running the restaurant at The Bristol Guild.

Perry-Smith then spent some time travelling around Europe before settling in Helford, Cornwall, where he opened Riverside, a restaurant with rooms. Joyce Molyneux from the Hole in the Wall opened The Carved Angel at Dartmouth at about the same time. They continued to collaborate and share ideas. In retirement Perry-Smith remained in Helford, although he continued to travel extensively. Despite his influence on other cooks, he wrote not a single cookery book.
