= Noel Benson =

Australian-New Zealand research geologist and academic (1885–1957)

Noel Benson FRS FRGS
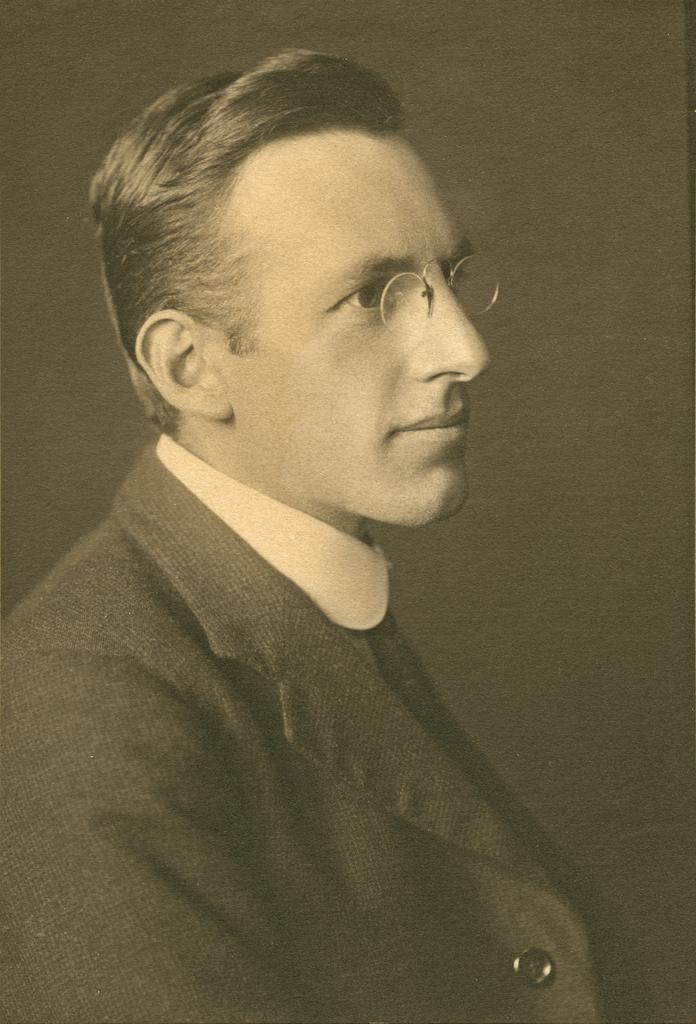
- Born: William Noel Benson; 26 December 1885; Anerley, London, England
- Died: 20 August 1957 (aged 71); Dunedin, New Zealand
- Education: University of Sydney; University of Cambridge; University of Tasmania
- Known for: expanding the study of geology in Australasia
- Awards: Lyell Medal (1939); Fellow of the Royal Society (1949); Mueller Medal (1951); Clarke Medal (1954)
- Scientific career
- Fields: Geology and mineralogy
- Workplaces: University of Sydney; University of Adelaide; University of Cambridge; University of Otago

William Noel Benson FRS FRGS (26 December 1885 – 20 August 1957) was an English-born research geologist and academic active first in Australia and then New Zealand. After studying geology at the University of Sydney, Benson worked temporarily at the University of Adelaide before returning to Sydney as a demonstrator. After winning an 1851 Exhibition Science Scholarship in 1910 he left Sydney to study at the University of Cambridge, where he worked until 1913. He returned to Sydney in 1914 as the Macleay Fellow in Geology, leaving in 1917 to become Chair of the Geology Department at the University of Otago, where for many years he was the only lecturer. During his lifetime he published over 100 papers and won several awards, including the Clarke Medal and the Lyell Medal. He died on 20 August 1957 following his retirement from academia in 1951.

== Early life and education ==
Benson was born on 26 December 1885 in Anerley, London, England, to William Benson, a Quaker shipping manager, and his wife Emma Elizabeth Benson, who was also descended from another branch of the Benson family. Soon after his birth the family moved to Tasmania, where he studied at the Friends' School, Hobart between 1897 and 1902. After scientific training at the University of Tasmania he started studying Geology and Mineralogy at the University of Sydney in 1905, where he was taught by Sir Edgeworth David. His first paper, on the contact aureola of a granitic body, was published before he even finished his degree, and after graduating in 1907 with First Class Honours he temporarily worked as a lecturer at the University of Adelaide. During this period he published three more papers, two on the petrology of Pre-Cambrian and Cambrian rocks in the Barossa Range and one on the geomorphology of the Mount Lofty Ranges.

== Lecturer ==
In 1909 he returned to the University of Sydney and became a demonstrator in the Geology Department. After winning an 1851 Exhibition Science Scholarship in 1910 he left Sydney in 1911 to work at the University of Cambridge, where he worked with John Edward Marr, Alfred Harker and Thomas George Bonney at the Sedgwick Museum of Earth Sciences. In 1913 he was granted the BA (Research) degree by Cambridge and left, spending most of the year travelling Europe with his parents and sisters. He returned to the University of Sydney in 1914 to take up the Macleay Fellowship in Geology. In 1915 he became a lecturer at the Geology Department, and in 1917 he became Chair of Geology and Mineralogy at the University of Otago, where he stayed until 1951.

Despite spending the first nine years at Otago as the only lecturer in the Department of Geology, Benson still published several papers, most notably a work on the Cenozoic petrographic part of East Otago. During his lifetime he published over 100 papers. In 1921 he was made President of the geology section of the Australasian Association for the Advancement of Science, and from 1945 to 1947 was president of the Royal Society of New Zealand. He was awarded the Lyell Fund and Lyell Medal in 1937 and 1939 respectively by the Geological Society of London, the Hector and Hutton medals of the Royal Society of New Zealand in 1933 and 1944, the Clarke Medal of the Royal Society of New South Wales in 1945 and the Mueller Medal of the Australasian Association for the Advancement of Science in 1951. In 1949 he became a Fellow of the Royal Society, and in 1951 an honorary member of the Mineralogical Society of London.

After retiring from the University of Otago in 1951 he continued to write papers, and at his death on 20 August 1957 was working on a revision to his paper on the Cenozoic Petrographic part of East Otago. The detailed geological map of the Dunedin area he produced was a significant work, his broader influence, however, was in expanding the study of geology in Australasia.

Awards
Preceded by Wilfred Eade Agar	Clarke Medal; 1945	Succeeded by John McConnell Black
