= Passion for Skiing =

Book that celebrates Hanover, Dartmouth's skiing history

- Author: Stephen L. Waterhouse
- Language: English
- Genre: Non-fiction
- Publication date: 2010
- Publication place: United States

Passion for Skiing is a book that was published in 2010 about the contributions of people from Hanover, New Hampshire and Dartmouth College to winter activities, particularly the sport of downhill skiing. The book highlights the history of skiing from 1910 to the current era. It was written by Dartmouth alumnus Stephen L. Waterhouse (Dartmouth College Class of 1965, Tuck Business School Class of 1967), a native of Sanford, Maine and part-time Vail, Colorado resident, with the help of other alumni and ski historians. The entire 426-page book, with its more than 50 contributing authors scattered across the US and abroad, was edited solely via email by Nick Stevens (Class of 1958), a former Dartmouth ski instructor, on his home computer in Maryland, and printed by Whitman Communications of Lebanon, New Hampshire.

The Dartmouth College impact on skiing continues. The college maintains its own ski area, the Dartmouth Skiway, a 100-acre (0.40 km2) skiing facility located over two mountains near the Hanover campus in Lyme Center, New Hampshire, that serves as the winter practice grounds for the nationally dominant Dartmouth Ski Team. Along with the Middlebury College Snow Bowl, the Dartmouth Skiway is one of two remaining college-owned ski areas in the eastern United States. Dartmouth and Hanover have been home to numerous members of the National Ski and Snowboard Hall of Fame.

Dartmouth and Hanover-connected Winter Olympians won five medals in the 2014 Winter Olympics in Sochi, Russia, the equivalent of 18th place on the country list. 12 Dartmouth alumni competed in Sochi. Three won medals: Gillian Apps (Dartmouth Class of 2006) won gold in women's hockey; Andrew Weibrecht (Dartmouth Class of 2009) won silver in men's super G alpine skiing; and Hannah Kearney (Dartmouth Class of 2015) won bronze in freestyle moguls skiing. All three had won medals in prior Olympics. Two other athletes with Dartmouth/Hanover connections won medals: Mikaela Shiffrin, a former Hanover, New Hampshire resident and daughter of Dartmouth alumnus Jeff Shiffrin (Dartmouth Class of 1976), won gold in the women's Olympic slalom; and Gus Kenworthy, son of Dartmouth alumnus Peter Kenworthy (Dartmouth Class of 1977), won silver in the inaugural slopestyle skiing event.

Waterhouse was assisted in writing the book by many contemporary historians of skiing such as Morten Lund, John Fry, Elisabeth Hussey and John Allen. The 440-page book covers founders of ski areas; founders of ski retail shops and the developers of ski resort residential and commercial buildings; initiators of extreme skiing like Bill Briggs (Dartmouth Class of 1954); creators of ski clothing, equipment and grooming technology; and some of the greatest ski racers at college, national and Olympic levels. It also discusses the nurses, doctors and ski patrollers who operate the medical facilities in ski communities. It also includes makers of ski movies and the founders of ski magazines.

The book has a foreword by two members of the National Ski Hall of Fame: Warren Miller, the legendary maker of ski movies, and Chick Igaya (Dartmouth Class of 1957), a three-time Olympic skier for Japan (a silver medalist in 1956 and the holder of the most NCAA championships). The appendix of the book has lists of people from Dartmouth who were ski racing champions, National Ski and Snowboard Hall of Fame members and those who made significant contributions to the sport like Dick Durrance (Dartmouth Class of 1939) and John Litchfield (Dartmouth Class of 1939).

Stephen Waterhouse and the book were given an Ullr Award in 2011 by the International Ski History Association at its annual conference with the National Ski and Snowboard Hall of Fame, held in Sun Valley, April 2011 in honor of its 75th anniversary.

The book was made into the 2013 documentary film Passion for Snow.

== Passion for Snow ==
Passion for Snow is a 62-minute documentary covering more than 100 years of skiing history at Dartmouth from the initial Dartmouth Winter Carnival to current times, as well as the college's influences and connections to developments in the ski industry. Executive producer Stephen Waterhouse said it depicts "champion skiers in action, but also people like Dr. Seuss (aka Theodor Seuss Geisel, Dartmouth Class of 1925), the late Surgeon General Dr. C. Everett Koop (Dartmouth Class of 1937) and noted poet Robert Frost (Dartmouth Class of 1896), who were influenced in their careers after spending winters in Hanover."

The film premiered in February 2013 at Dartmouth's Loew Auditorium at the Black Family Visual Arts Center during the 103rd Dartmouth Winter Carnival.

The film depicts Dartmouth skiers' involvement in World War II as part of the 10th Mountain Division, and the school's role in adaptive ski technology for the disabled. Paralympian Diana Golden, class of 1984, was Dartmouth's first disabled World Champion, won ten World Championships and a gold medal in the 1988 Paralympic. Dr. Sarah Billmeier, Dartmouth Class of 1999, was a six-time World Champion and winner of 13 medals in four Paralympics. The film includes footage of Diana Golden, 1988 Olympic gold medalist, doing a giant slalom descent in Calgary on a single leg, in the adaptive ski competition.

Waterhouse wrote the script with producer Lisa Densmore, Dartmouth class of 1983. Filmmaker Buck Henry, Class of 1952, narrates the film.

=== Awards and recognition ===
The International Ski History Association (ISHA) gave Passion for Snow a 2013 Film Award at its annual conference with the National Ski and Snowboard Hall of Fame held in Vail, Colorado in honor of its 50th anniversary.

The film, its Executive Producer Waterhouse, and other key production team members (Lisa Densmore, Producer; Rick Moulton, Associate Producer; Scott Esmond, Principal Editor; Joe Egan, Sound Editor) were nominated for the Emmy Award as the Documentary of the Year - 2014 by the National Academy of Television Arts & Sciences - New England; and highlighted at an awards ceremony on June 7, 2014 in Boston. The film also received an Award of 1st Place for Excellence in Craft - Television/Video (Outdoor Fun & Adventure Category) at the Outdoor Writer's Association of America annual conference, May 23–25, 2014 in McAllen, Texas. Both awards are based on the film's television premiere December 19, 2013 on Maine PBS, where it was designated their PBS Film of the Month.

== Additional sources ==
- Jay Webster (February 8, 2013). "Alumnus' movie showcases College's skiing culture". The Dartmouth
- Waterhouse (Winter 2011). "Passion for Skiing". Ski Patrol Magazine, p. 67
- Lisa Densmore (Fall 2012). "Film: Passion for Snow". Here in Hanover, pp. 97, 98
- Skiing Heritage Magazine, June 2010. Morten Lund, the most prolific writer on the history of skiing, says that "the book turns a magnifying glass on the college's major influence on skiing in America; much of the information is new..... under the leadership of the Dartmouth Outing Club the sport spread... in 1915, McGill sent its best skiers to compete at the [Dartmouth Winter] Carnival—and intercollegiate ski competition was born. Other forceful Dartmouth innovations included ski classes for novices... professional coaches for ski teams... the nation's first overhead cable lift... the top winners of the first US Alpine combined Olympic trials at Mt. Rainier in 1936... and the largest contingent in the US National Ski Hall of Fame".
- Jan Stearns (April 5, 2013). "'Passion for Snow' highlights Dartmouth's link to skiing history". Jan's Blog, Waterville Valley Realty
- Press release (April 14, 2013). "Passion for Snow Receives 'Ski History Film of the Year' Award". Dartmouth Class of 1961 Presidents Page
