= Edward Waterhouse (FRS) =

English heraldic writer and cleric

Edward Waterhouse (1619–1670) was an English heraldic writer and cleric.

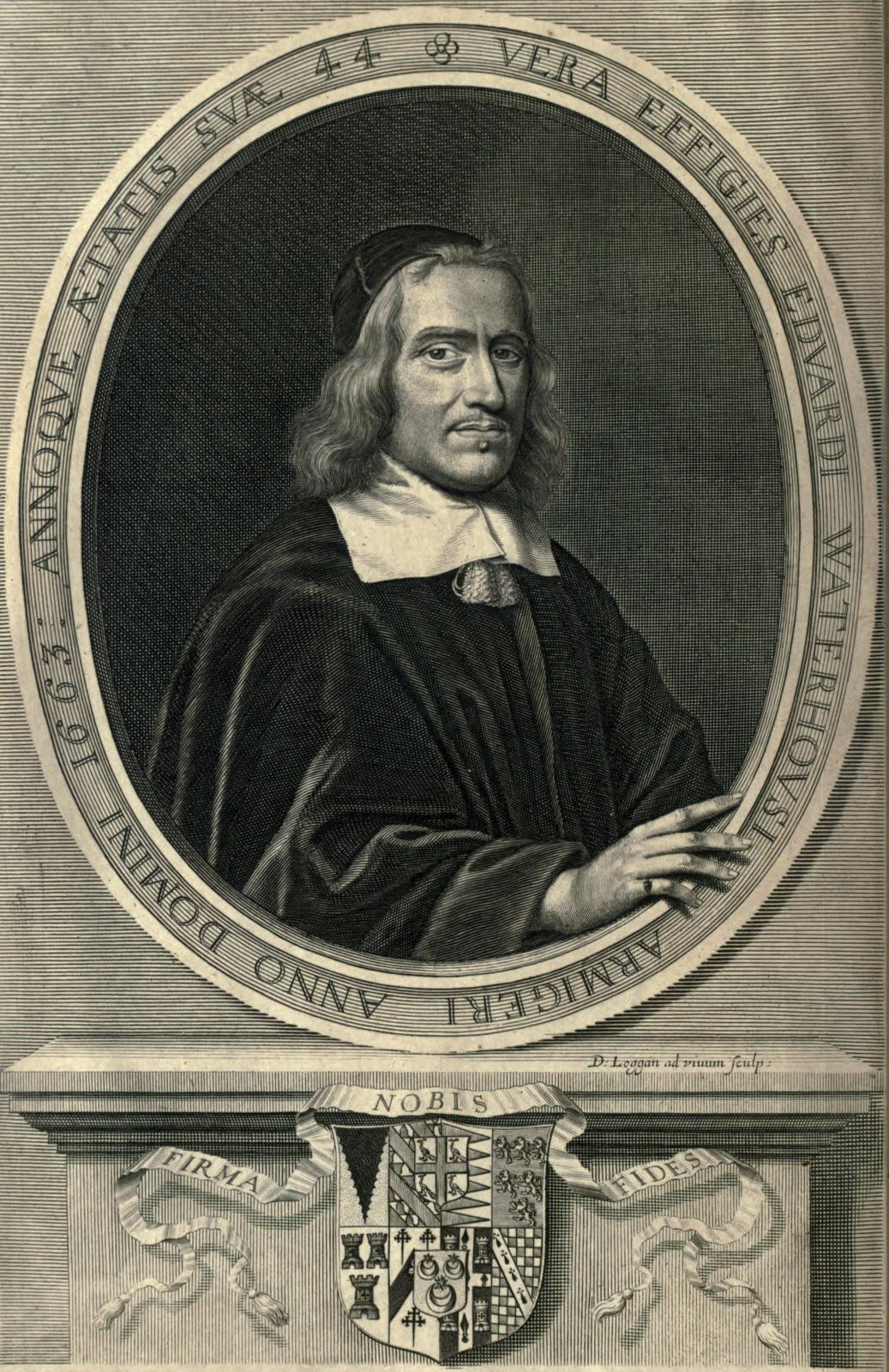
Edward Waterhouse, portrait from Fortescutus Illustratus (1663)

== Life ==
Born at Greenford, Middlesex, he was son of Francis Waterhouse of that place, by his wife Bridget, daughter of Morgan Powell; Sir Edward Waterhouse was his great-uncle. He was admitted in 1635 to Emmanuel College, Cambridge, where he graduated Legum Doctor (LLD) per literas regias in 1668. In the time of the Commonwealth he lived for some years at Oxford in order to pursue studies in the Bodleian Library. In 1660 he was lodging in Sion College, London.

In 1663 Waterhouse became a fellow of the Royal Society. Through Gilbert Sheldon, archbishop of Canterbury, he took holy orders in 1668, and became a preacher. He died on 30 May 1670 at his house at Mile End Green, and was interred on 2 June at Greenford, where he had an estate.

== Works ==
Waterhouse's works were:

- A humble Apologie for Learning and Learned Men, London, 1653.
- Two Brief Meditations: i. Of Magnanimitie under Crosses; ii. Of Acquaintance with God. By E. W., London (5 December), 1653.
- A modest Discourse of the Piety, Charity, and Policy of Elder Times and Christians. Together with those their vertues paralleled by Christians, members of the Church of England, London, 1655.
- A Discours and Defense of Arms and Armory, Shewing the Nature and Uses of Arms and Honour in England, from the Camp, the Court, the City, under the two latter of which are contained Universities and Inns of Court, London, 1660
- The Sphere of Gentry: deduced from the Principles of Nature. An Historical and Genealogical Work of Arms and Blazon, in four Books, London, 1661. William Dugdale's information, via Anthony Wood, was that this work was by Waterhouse, though it was published under the name of Sylvanus Morgan.
- Fortescutus Illustratus; or, a Commentary on Sir John Fortescue, lord chancellor to Henry VI, his book De Laudibus legum Angliæ, London, 1663.
- The Gentlemans Monitor: or a Sober Inspection into the Virtues, Vices, and ordinary means of the rise and decay of Men and Families. With the authors apology and application to the Nobles and Gentry of England, seasonable for these times, London, 1665.
- A Short Narrative of the Late Dreadful Fire in London: Together with Certain Considerations Remarkable therein, and Deducible therefrom, London, written 20 October 1666, published 1667.

He also contributed "Observations on the Life of Sir Edward Waterhouse" to David Lloyd's State Worthies, 1670.

== Family ==
Waterhouse married, first, Mary, daughter and heiress of Robert Smith, alias Carrington, by Magdalen, his wife, daughter of Robert Harvey, comptroller of the custom house to James I; and, secondly, Elizabeth, daughter and coheiress of Richard Bateman of Hartington, Derbyshire, and London, by Christiana, daughter of William Stone of London. Waterhouse survived his second wife, who left him one son, Edward, and two daughters, Elizabeth and Bridget; the daughters alone survived him.

== Notes ==
Attribution

This article incorporates text from a publication now in the public domain: Lee, Sidney, ed. (1899). "Waterhouse, Edward (1619-1670)". Dictionary of National Biography. Vol. 59. London: Smith, Elder & Co.
