= Sylvanus Morgan =

English painter

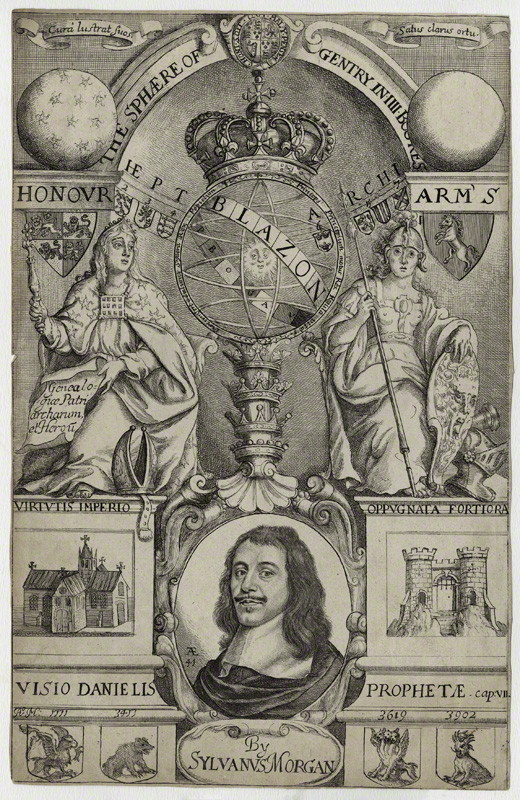
1661 etching by Richard Gaywood of Sylvanus Morgan from The Sphere of Gentry

Sylvanus Morgan (March 1620 – 27 March 1693) was an English arms-painter and author.

== Biography ==
Morgan was born in London in March 1620, was brought up to and practised the profession of an arms-painter.

In 1642, he wrote "A Treatise of Honor and Honorable Men", which remained in manuscript.

In 1648, he printed a poem entitled "London, King Charles his Augusta, or City Royal of the Founders"; and in 1652 "Horologiographia Optica, Dialling universal and particular".

In 1661, he published a work on heraldry, entitled The Sphere of Gentry, deduced from the Principles of Nature: an Historical and Genealogical Work of Arms and Blazon, in Four Books. Morgan says that this book had taken him years to compile and had been originally intended for dedication to Charles I, and that he had neglected his trade as arms-painter, suffered much illness, and had had his house burnt down. It contains a title-page with a portrait of Morgan, etched by Richard Gaywood. The work was pedantic, and was discredited by Sir William Dugdale and other heralds; and it was alleged that it was really the work of Edward Waterhouse.

In 1666, he published a supplement, entitled Armilogia, sive Ars Chromocritica: the Language of Arms by the Colours and Metals.

Morgan lived near the Royal Exchange in London. He died on 27 March 1693, and was buried in the church of St Bartholomew, behind the Exchange. He left a large collection of manuscripts, which came by marriage to Josiah Jones, heraldic painter and painter to Drury Lane Theatre, by whom they were sold by auction in 1759.
