= David Waterhouse (MP) =

English Member of Parliament

David Waterhouse (c. 1564-after 1638), of Ognel Hall, Birstal, Yorkshire and the Inner Temple, London, was an English Member of Parliament (MP). His brother was MP, Robert Waterhouse.

He was a Member of the Parliament of England for Aldborough in 1589 and for Berwick-upon-Tweed in 1601.
