= Diana Golden (skier) =

American para-alpine skier (1963–2001)

Personal information
- Full name: Diana Golden Brosnihan
- Born: March 20, 1963 Lincoln, Massachusetts, U.S.
- Died: August 25, 2001 (aged 38) Providence, Rhode Island, U.S.

Skiing career
- Sport: Alpine skiing
- Retired: 1990
- Disciplines: Giant Slalom, Slalom, Downhill and Combined

Olympics
- Teams: 1988
- Medals: (Disabled Giant Slalom gold)

Diana Golden Brosnihan (née Diana Golden, March 20, 1963 – August 25, 2001) was an American disabled ski racer. After losing a leg to cancer at age 12, she went on to win 10 world and 19 United States championships between 1986, and 1990 as a three-tracker, or one-legged skier. Golden also won an Olympic gold medal in giant slalom at the 1988 Calgary Games, where disabled skiing was a demonstration sport. She participated in alpine skiing at two Winter Paralympic Games, in 1980, and 1988, winning two gold medals in the latter year. After retiring from skiing, cancer returned in 1992, and 1996, with her last bout of cancer resulting in her death in 2001.

== Early life ==
Diana Golden grew up in Lincoln, Massachusetts, and began skiing at the age of five, making regular trips to Cannon Mountain Ski Area with her parents. However, in 1975, at the age of 12, her right leg collapsed while she was walking home from skiing and doctors diagnosed bone cancer. As a result, the doctors had to amputate her leg above the knee to stop the cancer from spreading.

Following the surgery, the first question Golden asked was whether she would be able to ski again and was relieved to discover that she would be able to. After being fitted with a prosthetic device she learned to walk and then ski again within six or seven months with the help of the New England Handicapped Sportsmen's Association. In her junior year at Lincoln-Sudbury Regional High School she became a member of the ski team and by the age of 17 had joined the United States Disabled Ski Team (USDST).

After high school, Golden went to Dartmouth College and gained a degree in English Literature in 1984. While there in 1982, she competed at the World Handicapped Championships in Norway, winning a gold medal in the downhill and a silver in the giant slalom. However, she then became disillusioned with competitive skiing and joined a group of born again Christians. After college, she went to work for a local firm selling computer software before a friend reintroduced her to skiing and she rediscovered her love of it. In 1985, she rejoined the USDST and gained sponsorships and a scholarship to be able to pursue it full-time.

== Skiing career ==
Within a year of taking up skiing again, Golden had won four gold medals internationally, including three in the 1986 World Disabled Championships. She was dominant in the United States Disabled Alpine Championships winning all four of the giant slalom, slalom, downhill and combined disciplines in both 1987, and 1988. Also in 1988, Golden won two golds at the World Disabled Championships and most famously won a gold in the giant slalom at the Winter Olympics in Calgary, where the event was a demonstration sport. Golden retired in 1990, but before this would win three gold medals at her last World Disabled Championships in 1990 at Winter Park Resort in Colorado. In total throughout her career Golden won 19 national, 10 World and one Olympic disabled gold medals.

Golden at first used outriggers when skiing, but would abandon these in favour of the standard ski poles, so being able to reach greater speeds but requiring more strength and stamina. In 1990, using the normal ski poles and one ski, Golden was recorded as travelling at 65 miles per hour during a downhill race. As well as competing in disabled events, Golden took part in able-bodied events and she got the United States Ski and Snowboard Association (USSA) to pass the "Golden Rule" in 1985. Under this rule, the top disabled skiers were able to race after only the top 15 skiers had taken part, thus enabling the disabled skiers to compete before the course becomes rutted from heavy usage. In 1987, competing against able-bodied competitors, Golden finished 10th in a USSA competition.

Golden received a number of awards during her career, including the USSA's Beck Award in 1986 honouring the best female skier in international competition. It was in 1988, however that Golden received the most recognition, when both Ski Racing Magazine and the United States Olympic Committee named her female skier of the year, choosing her ahead of able-bodied skiers.

== Later life ==
Golden became a motivational speaker following her skiing career, and also took up rock climbing and mountaineering leading to a successful climb of Mount Rainier. However, in 1992, at the age of 29, she was diagnosed with breast cancer, for which she had to be treated with bilateral mastectomies. While operating on her, doctors also found a pre-malignant growth and as a result had to remove her uterus. After this, realising she could never have children, Golden became depressed and in 1993, attempted suicide, something which she would consider again.

Golden recovered and resumed motivational speaking but would give this up for good in 1996 when she was again diagnosed with breast cancer, which was treatable but now incurable. She returned to New England from Colorado and it was here that she once more met Steve Brosnihan, a freelance cartoonist she had known at Dartmouth College. Brosnihan and Golden fell in love and were married in August 1997.

After her retirement from skiing Golden continued to be honoured by various organisations. In 1991, the Women's Sports Foundation gave her the Flo Hyman Memorial Award, while in 1997 she was inducted into the US National Ski Hall of Fame and the International Women's Sports Foundation Hall of Fame. The citation on her entry into the International Hall of Fame read "She persuaded the ski world to treat all athletes the same, regardless of ability or, in her case, disability."

Golden died from her cancer in August 2001, at the age of 38. Following her death, Golden would inspire a race series called the "Diana Golden Race Series", hosted by Disabled Sports USA, at mountains which offer programs that teach the physically disabled how to ski. The Diana Golden Opportunities Fund is the endowment that supports and encourages junior athletes with disabilities in their pursuit of excellence in skiing by providing scholarships for purchasing equipment or participating in an adaptive race or development camp.

== See also ==
- Passion for Snow

Preceded by Chris Evert	Flo Hyman Memorial Award; 1991	Succeeded by Nancy Lopez
