= Jabez Waterhouse =

Methodist minister (1821–1891)

Jabez Bunting Waterhouse (19 April 1821 – 18 January 1891) was an English-born Australian Methodist minister and a leading legislator within Methodist conferences.

== Early life ==
Waterhouse was the fifth child of the Rev. John Waterhouse, a Yorkshire Methodist, and was born in London. He attended Kingswood School in Bath from 1832 until 1835 when he was apprenticed to a printer. The Waterhouse family migrated to Australia in 1839 when John Waterhouse became general superintendent of the Wesleyan Methodist Mission in Australia. When the family settled in Hobart a printing company was bought and Jabez managed it. The following year Jabez became a local preacher ministering to convicts. He became a probationer in 1842 and, after studying at Richmond Theological College, he was ordained in the Methodist chapel, Spitalfields. On 13 August 1847 Waterhouse married Maria Augusta, née Bode, at Windsor, Berkshire.

== Australian ministry ==
In 1847, Waterhouse returned to Van Diemen's Land and during the following eight years was appointed to the Hobart, Westbury, Campbell Town and Longford circuits. He was appointed to South Australia in 1855 serving in Kapunda, Willunga and Adelaide. In 1862, he was secretary of the Australasian Conference of the Wesleyan Church held in Adelaide. After transferring to New South Wales in 1864, Waterhouse served in Maitland, Goulburn, Orange, Waverley, Parramatta, Newcastle and Glebe. He was elected secretary of the New South Wales and Queensland Annual Conference in 1874 and 1875, president in 1876 and secretary of the first three general conferences of the Australasian Wesleyan Methodist Church (Melbourne 1875, Sydney 1878 and Adelaide 1881).

== Legacy ==
Waterhouse's ministry was supported by his sound financial expertise and he was noted as a gifted preacher within his church. He supported the Wesleyan Church in Tonga during the formation of the new national church and published on this dispute. He died at Randwick, survived by his wife and seven sons.

== Publication ==
- Waterhouse, J. B. The Secession and the Persecution in Tonga (Sydney, 1886)

== Bibliography ==
- J. Colwell (ed), A Century in the Pacific (Sydney, 1914)
- S. Dunn, The Missionary of Australasia and Polynesia (London, 1842)
- G. J. Waterhouse (ed), A Brief Account of the Life and Activities of Rev. John Waterhouse (Sydney, 1937)

== See also ==
- John Waterhouse—son
- Walter Waterhouse—grandson
- George Waterhouse—brother
- Joseph Waterhouse—brother
