= William Waterhouse =

William Waterhouse may refer to:

- William Waterhouse (bassoonist) (1931–2007), English bassoonist, musicologist and academic
- William Waterhouse (violinist) (1917–2003), Canadian violinist
- William C. Waterhouse (1941–2016), American mathematician
- Bill Waterhouse (1922–2019), Australian bookmaker, businessman and former barrister
- William Glenn Waterhouse, American Olympic sailor

== See also ==
- John William Waterhouse (1849–1917), English painter
- William H. Waterhouse House, Florida
