= Waterhouse Museum =

Art museum

Coordinates: 39.9532°N 74.1975°W

- Established: January 06, 2000
- Location: 17 Washington Street; Toms River, New Jersey; United States
- Type: Art
- Director: Edward C. Sere
- Website: Waterhouse Museum

The Waterhouse Museum was located in Toms River, New Jersey. The museum exhibited art by Colonel Charles Waterhouse, a U. S. Marine veteran of the Battle of Iwo Jima during World War II. The works at the museum depicted military scenes from the American Revolutionary War to the present with a focus on the Marine Corps. When the museum closed, the majority of Waterhouse's body of work was gifted to the United States Marine Corps.

The Museum included:

- Colonel's Studio
- Conference Gallery
- Foyer Gallery
- Illustration Gallery
- Main Gallery
- Studio Gallery

== See also ==
- Marine Corps Museums
- United States Marine Corps History Division
