= Walter Lawry Waterhouse =

Australian agricultural scientist (1887-1969)

- Born: 31 August 1887
- Died: 9 December 1969 (aged 82)
- Parents: John Waterhouse (father); Hephzibah, née Lawry (mother)
- Scientific career
- Fields: Agriculture

Walter Lawry Waterhouse, MC (31 August 1887 – 9 December 1969) was an Australian agricultural scientist, a fellow of the Australian Academy of Science and Clarke Medallist.

== Early life ==
Walter Waterhouse was born in West Maitland, New South Wales, the son of educator John Waterhouse and Hephezibah, née Lawry. Walter was the grandson of Wesleyan minister Jabez Waterhouse. In 1924, he married Dorothy Blair Hazlewood, granddaughter of Rev. David Hazlewood, a Wesleyan Methodist missionary who is renowned for translating the Old Testament into Fijian. Walter was educated at Sydney Boys' High School, where his father was headmaster, and later at Hawkesbury Agricultural College where he gained a diploma in 1907. Sometime during the period of 1906–10 Walter was headmaster at the Methodist Mission Boys High School at Davuilevu in Fiji. There is a photograph of him from this time at Australian Museum image "M. Whan, J.H.L. and W.L. Waterhouse, Davuilevu, Fiji" He enlisted in World War I, and was awarded the Military Cross.

== Scientific career ==
In 1918 Waterhouse studied at the Imperial College of Science and Technology, London, and obtained its diploma in 1921. He developed varieties of wheat which resisted rust. He was awarded the Clarke Medal by the Royal Society of New South Wales in 1943. A full biography of W.L.W. can be found at AAS Biographical Memoirs. Further biographical particulars are available at Encyclopedia of Australian Science.

Awards
Preceded by William Rowan Browne	Clarke Medal; 1943	Succeeded by Wilfred Eade Agar
