= John Waterhouse (headmaster) =

Australian headmaster (1852–1940)

John Waterhouse (3 March 1852 – 19 March 1940) was an Australian principal who was headmaster of two of New South Wales first public boys high schools.

== Early life ==
Waterhouse was born in Campbell Town, Tasmania, the second son of the Wesleyan minister Jabez Bunting Waterhouse. With his father's ministry taking the family around Australia, his early education was varied. Waterhouse started school in a small country town in South Australia before attending St Peter's College, Adelaide in 1860. When the family moved to Maitland, New South Wales he attended Dr Frazer's Grammar School for a short period before being enrolled as a boarding student at Newington College in 1865. At Newington he later became a pupil-teacher, before graduating MA from the University of Sydney in 1876. In July 1880 when Newington moved from Silverwater to Stanmore Waterhouse was the one assistant master supporting President Joseph Horner Fletcher and Headmaster Joseph Coates. The John Waterhouse Society at Newington College, is a co-curricular activity in which a group of students meet to discuss philosophical ideas and issues and is named in honour of Waterhouse.

== Educationalist ==
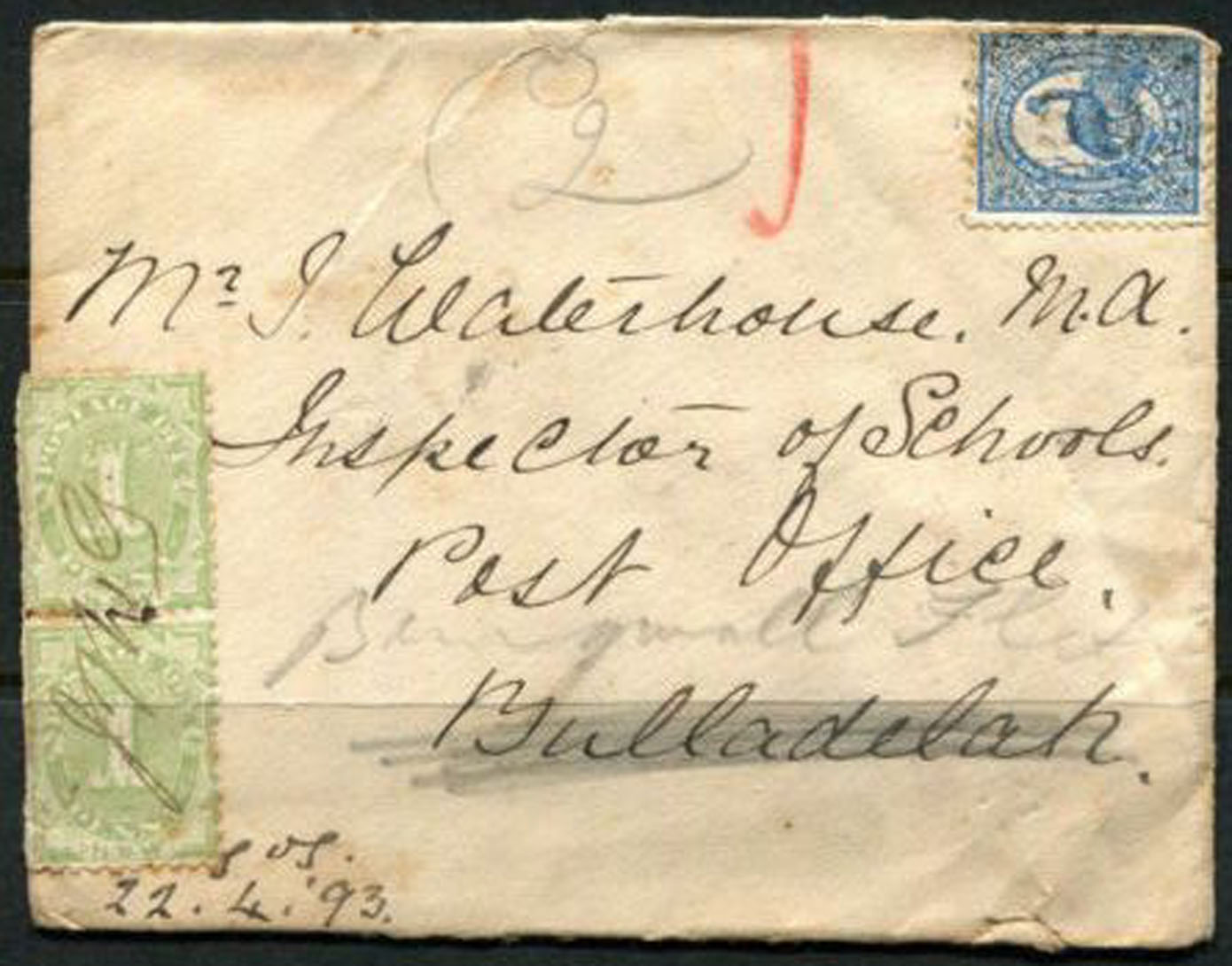
Letter from Dungog to Waterhouse at Bungwall Flat on his rounds in 1893

In September 1883 Joseph Coates successfully applied for the headmastership of the soon to be established Sydney Boys' High School and Waterhouse as head of Maitland High School. Sydney High opened in October 1883 and as Coates could not leave Newington until the end of the year, John Waterhouse was appointed to open the school. His letter of appointment clearly names him "Headmaster" and so he is rightly regarded as the founder of Sydney High. At the beginning of 1884 he opened Maitland. In 1889, he was appointed Inspector of Schools in the Dungog region. While in Dungog tragedy struck on 29 October 1894 when Waterhouse's wife Hephezibah Waterhouse (née Lawry) and daughter drowned in the wreck of SS Wairarapa on Great Barrier Island, New Zealand. He was left as a widower with five children under 11 years of age. (He married his sister in law in 1901.) In January 1896, Waterhouse transferred to the Lithgow district, but this position was to be short-lived. In July 1896, he was appointed headmaster of Sydney Boys' High School and became a resident of Chatswood. He took on a school that had suffered as a result of the 1890s economic crisis and the degenerative illness of its first Headmaster, Joseph Coates. Over the next nineteen years, Waterhouse was to lead the revitalisation of Sydney High School. The enrolment increased from just over 100 in 1896 to 350 in 1906 and 422 in 1915. Academic results at the public examinations during his term were outstanding and the school was admitted to the GPS in 1906. Waterhouse retired as Headmaster of Sydney High in 1915 on medical advice. His doctors had given him only two years to live. He lived to spend 25 years in retirement. He died aged 88 in Chatswood.

== Scientific interests ==
One of his retirement hobbies was fossils and his name is perpetuated in the Nuculana Waterhousei which he discovered. Waterhouse was also interested in geology and ornithology. During his appointment in Maitland he was associated with Professor Sir Edgeworth David and his work on the Greta coal seam.

== See also ==
- Jabez Waterhouse – his father
- Walter Waterhouse – his son
- Joseph Waterhouse – his uncle
