= Waterhouse Island =

Waterhouse Island may refer to:

- Little Waterhouse Island, Australia
- Waterhouse Island (Tasmania), Australia
- Waterhouse Island (Antarctica), a small island near Davis Station named for Medical Officer Dr Robbin Waterhouse in 1971.
