= Robert Waterhouse (MP) =

English Member of Parliament

Robert Waterhouse (1544-1598), of Shibden Hall, Halifax, Yorkshire, was an English Member of Parliament (MP). He was a Member of the Parliament of England for Aldborough in 1584.
