= Charles Waterhouse (artist) =

American painter, illustrator and sculptor (1924–2013)

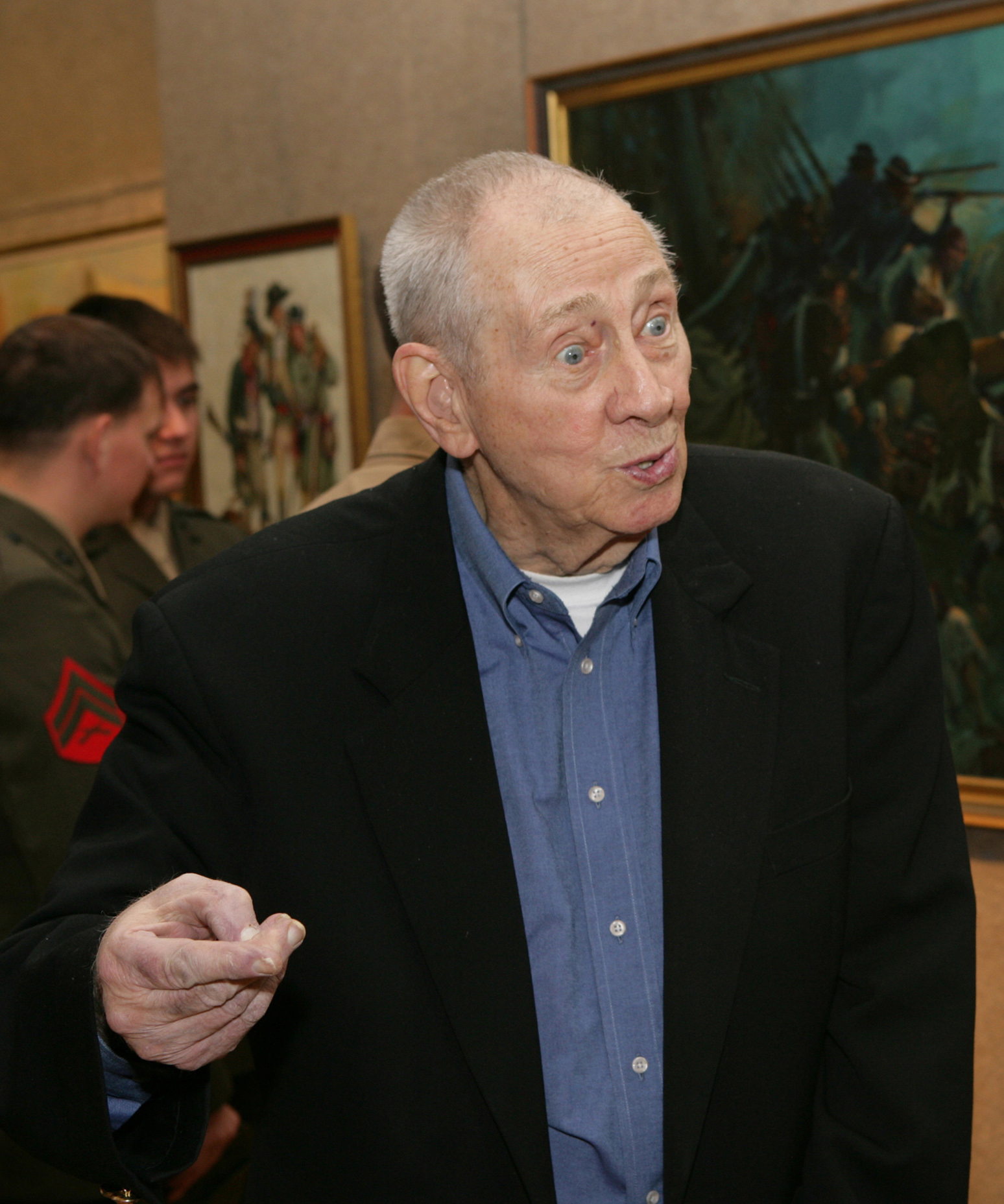
- Waterhouse at the Salmagundi Club in 2008
- Born: September 22, 1924; Columbus, Georgia, U.S.
- Died: November 16, 2013 (aged 89); Toms River, New Jersey, U.S.
- Education: Newark School of Fine & Industrial Art
- Known for: Painting, illustrating & sculpting
- Awards: Marine Corps Artist in Residence; Legion of Merit; Purple Heart Medal
- Patrons: U. S. Marine Corps

Charles H. Waterhouse (September 22, 1924 – November 16, 2013) was an American painter, illustrator and sculptor renowned for using United States Marine Corps historical themes as the motif for his works. His art spans subjects from Tun Tavern, the birthplace of the U. S. Marines to present day topics. Throughout his career, he created over 500 pieces for the Marine Corps art collection.

== Life ==
Waterhouse enlisted in the Marine Corps in August 1943. He served with the 5th Marine Division during the Pacific campaign of World War II, landing with the first wave assault on Iwo Jima on February 19, 1945. During the battle, he was severely wounded as a result of enemy action, suffering permanent nerve damage to his left hand. He received the Purple Heart medal. After the war, Waterhouse formally studied art at the Newark School of Fine and Industrial Art in Newark, New Jersey where, under the guidance of Steven R. Kidd and W. T. Aylward, he was trained in the Brandywine tradition of romantic realism as practiced by Howard Pyle, N.C. Wyeth, Harvey Dunn and others. Upon graduating in 1950 Waterhouse became a sought-after illustrator, with his work appearing in hundreds of books, magazines and publications. During the Vietnam War, he served three tours in Vietnam as a civilian combat artist. In 1971 Waterhouse received a commission as a major from the Marine Corps History Division to create 14 salon-size paintings depicting the Marines in the Revolution for the U.S. Bicentennial. The paintings were such a success the Marines awarded Waterhouse with the title "USMC Artist in Residence", thus becoming the first and only person to earn such recognition. At the same time, the Marines promoted him to colonel and he retired at that rank on February 19, 1991. Throughout his retirement, he continued to paint the history of the Corps. At the age of 81, Waterhouse set out to create a comprehensive series of paintings showing Marines and navy corpsmen in the acts for which they were recognized with the Medal of Honor. At the time of his death he had completed 225 canvases and 107 portraits of USMC and USN corpsman recipients from the Civil War through Afghanistan. In 2012, Waterhouse donated the entire Medal of Honor series and additional paintings to the National Museum of the Marine Corps. Waterhouse's work can be seen in museums, federal buildings and historical sites around the country. His illustrated design of the USMC emblem, emblazoned on a t-shirt, was worn by an astronaut in space. Waterhouse was the author and illustrator of Vietnam Sketchbook, Delta to the DMZ Sketchbook and Marines and Others, and the author of Illustrations in Black, White and Gray by Steven R. Kidd and The Blue Book Illustrations of Herbert Morton Stoops. During his lifetime, Colonel Waterhouse was honored with many awards, including the Legion of Merit.

== Death ==
Waterhouse died on November 16, 2013, at the home of his daughter in Tom's River, New Jersey. He was interred at Arlington National Cemetery along with his wife Barbara Andersen Waterhouse (August 26, 1927 – December 28, 2009) on February 19, 2014.

== See also ==
- National Museum of the Marine Corps (works on display at this museum)
- Waterhouse Museum
