= Peter Waterhouse (military officer) =

British military officer

Lieutenant-Colonel Peter Waterhouse
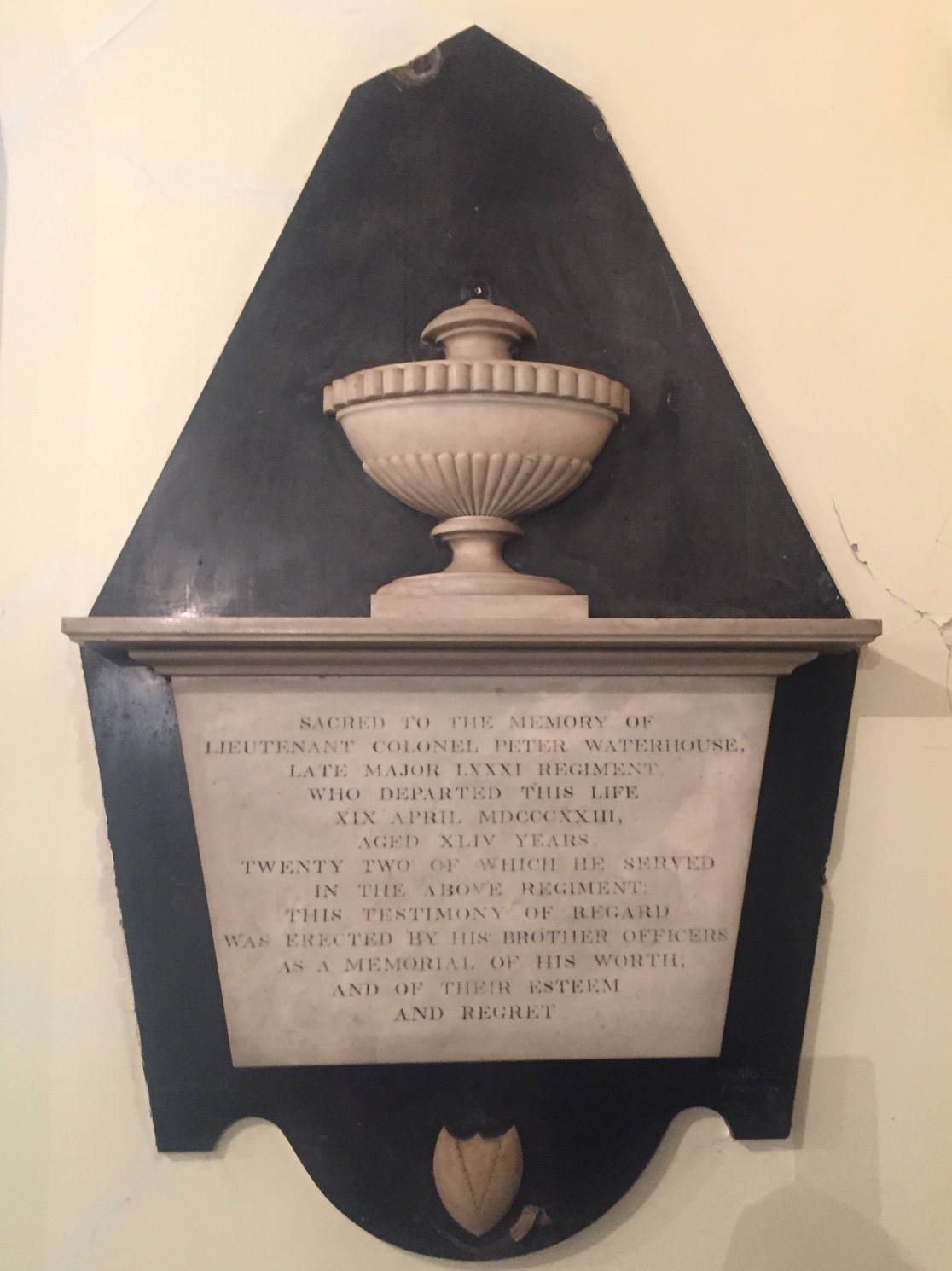
- Memorial to Lt-Colonel Peter Waterhouse, St. Paul's Church, Halifax
- Born: 5 September 1779; Edinburgh, Scotland
- Died: 19 May 1823 (aged 43); Halifax, Nova Scotia
- Burial place: Old Burying Ground (Halifax, Nova Scotia)
- Military career
- Allegiance: Kingdom of Great Britain
- Branch: British Army
- Service years: 1799–1823
- Rank: Lieutenant-Colonel
- Unit: 81st Foot
- Conflicts: War of the Third Coalition; Maida; Peninsular War; Castalla Ordal; Waterloo campaign

Lieutenant-Colonel Peter Waterhouse (5 September 1779 – 19 May 1823) was a British officer in the 81st Regiment during the Napoleonic Wars. After the 1815 Waterloo campaign, the regiment served in Halifax, Nova Scotia, where he died on 19 May 1823; his burial was led by General Sir James Kempt.

== Career ==
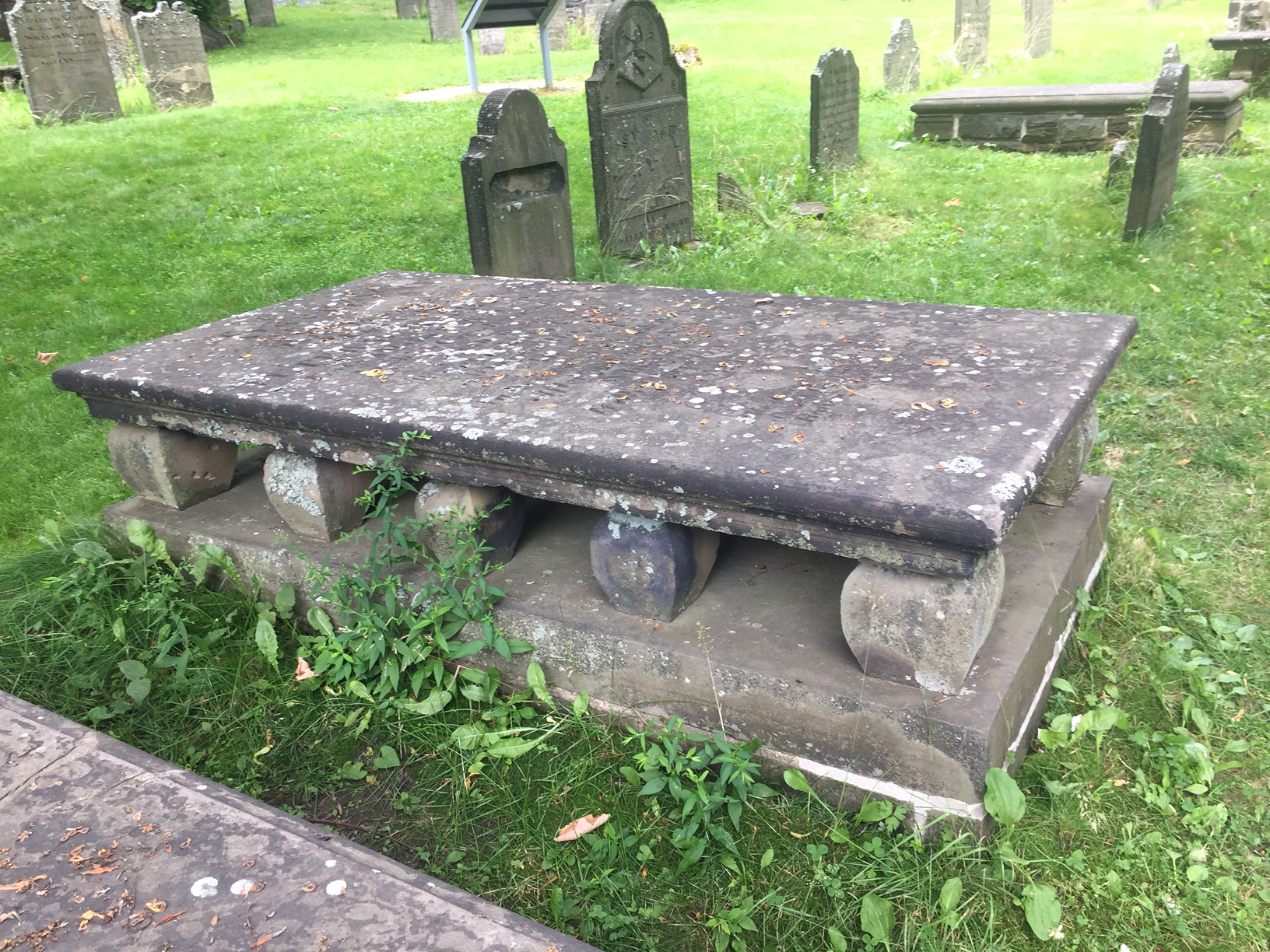
Tomb of Peter Waterhouse, Old Burying Ground (Halifax, Nova Scotia)

Waterhouse was commissioned as a lieutenant in the 81st Foot in June 1799. Shortly after this, the regiment was posted to Cape Colony in South Africa, captured from the Dutch in 1795 and remained there until the colony was returned under the 1802 Treaty of Amiens. During the War of the Third Coalition, the first battalion of the 81st joined the British expeditionary force in Southern Italy; by now a captain, Waterhouse was wounded at the Battle of Maida in 1806.

He was promoted major in November 1811, and after six years in Sicily, the 81st was assigned to the Catalonia expedition, a feint to help with the main Allied thrust in 1812. The battalion landed in Alicante in August 1812 and was involved in the failed seaborne attack on Dénia in October 1812. He was mentioned in dispatches by Major General Rufane Shaw Donkin, who wrote: "I am much indebted to Major Waterhouse of the 81st Regiment for his assistance during the whole day but particularly at the moment of embarkation, which he covered in a manner that did him the highest credit.

Waterhouse and the 81st remained on the east coast of Spain, taking part in the battles of Castalla Ordal, until the war ended in April 1814. He was with the second battalion during the 1815 Waterloo Campaign, which was assigned to guard duties in Brussels and missed the Battle of Waterloo.

After Waterloo, the second battalion was disbanded and Waterhouse returned to the first battalion, which was based in Ireland; he was promoted Lieutenant Colonel on 12 August 1819. In 1822, the battalion was posted to Halifax, Nova Scotia, where Waterhouse died on 19 May 1823 and buried in the Old Burying Ground.

== Sources ==
- Knowles, Sir Lees (1918). The British in Capri, 1806-1808 (2009 ed.). Cornell University Library. ISBN 978-1112111785.
- Rogers, s (1872). Historical Record of The Eighty-First Regiment or Loyal Lincoln Volunteers Containing An Account Of The Regiment In 1793 And Of Its Subsequent Services To 1872. The Twenty-Eighth Regimental Press.
