= Joseph Waterhouse (minister) =

English missionary (1828–1881)

- Born: February 1828; Halifax, Yorkshire
- Died: 29 April 1881 (aged 53); Near Dunedin
- Occupations: Minister and missionary
- Parents: John Waterhouse (father); Jane Beadnell, née Skipsey (mother)
- Relatives: Jabez Waterhouse (brother), John Waterhouse (nephew)

Joseph Waterhouse (February 1828 – 29 April 1881) was an English-born Australian Methodist minister and missionary in Fiji. He is credited with having converted Seru Epenisa Cakobau, the chief of Bau and King of Fiji, to Christianity.

== Early life ==
Waterhouse was born in Halifax, Yorkshire, the ninth child of the Methodist minister John Waterhouse and his wife Jane Beadnell, née Skipsey. He attended Kingswood School, Bath from 1832 until 1836. The Waterhouse family migrated to Australia in 1839 where John Waterhouse became general superintendent of the Wesleyan Methodist Mission in Australia and Joseph attended St Andrew's Presbyterian school, Hobart. Waterhouse married Elizabeth (née Watson) on 26 March 1850.

== Church career ==
Waterhouse joined the Methodist society at 14 and in 1849 joined the ministry as a missionary to Fiji where he served until 1857. After two years in Australia he returned to Fiji in 1859 as chairman of the district and while touring the islands campaigned against cession to Britain. After a period of ill health, Waterhouse left Fiji in 1864 and worked in Tasmania and Victoria. Following the annexation of Fiji to Britain, Waterhouse returned to the islands and led the Training Institution until 1878 when he returned to Australia. Waterhouse was drowned when the SS Tararua was wrecked off the coast of Dunedin and was survived by his wife and ten children.

== Legacy ==
Waterhouse was a supporter of local teachers in Fiji and is said to have converted fierce cannibal Seru Epenisa Cakobau, who as Vunivalu of Bau (Paramount Chief of Bau) became King of Fiji when he formed the first unified Fijian state in 1871.

== Publication ==
- Vah-tah-ah - The Feejeean Princess (London, 1857)
- The Native Minister (London, 1858)
- The King and People of Fiji (London, 1866)
- The Ocean Child - Memoir of Mrs Anna M. Rooney (London, 1868)

== See also ==
- Thomas Baker (missionary)
- Jabez Waterhouse - Brother
- John Waterhouse - Nephew
