= Electoral history of William Hall-Jones =

List of elections featuring William Hall-Jones as a candidate

This is a summary of the electoral history of William Hall-Jones, Prime Minister of New Zealand, (1906).

== Parliamentary elections ==
=== 1890 by-election ===
1890 Timaru by-election
Party	Candidate	Votes	%	±%
Independent Liberal	William Hall-Jones	422	48.61	
Independent	Edward G. Kerr	344	39.63	−0.58
Independent Labour	W F Alpin	88	10.13	
Informal votes		14	1.61	
Majority		78	8.98	
Turnout		868	67.28	−0.27

=== 1890 election ===
1890 general election: Timaru
Party	Candidate	Votes	%	±%
Independent Liberal	William Hall-Jones	472	31.78	−16.83
Independent	Edward G. Kerr	420	28.28	−11.35
Liberal	Jeremiah Twomey	366	24.65	
Conservative	Samuel Frederick Smithson	218	14.68	
Liberal	Philip E. Thoreau	9	0.61	
Majority		52	3.50	−5.48
Turnout		1,485	60.44	−6.84
Registered electors		2,457		

=== 1893 election ===
1893 general election: Timaru
Party	Candidate	Votes	%	±%
Independent Liberal	William Hall-Jones	1,914	55.94	+24.16
Liberal	Edward G. Kerr	1,507	44.05	+15.77
Majority		407	11.89	+8.39
Turnout		3,421	81.22	+20.78
Registered electors		4,212		

=== 1896 election ===
1896 general election: Timaru
Party	Candidate	Votes	%	±%
Liberal	William Hall-Jones	2,180	57.36	+1.42
Conservative	Frank Smith	1,539	40.50	
Informal votes		81	2.14	
Majority		641	16.86	+4.97
Turnout		3,800		

James Stephen Keith (independent) withdrew before election day.

=== 1899 election ===
1899 general election: Timaru
Party	Candidate	Votes	%	±%
Liberal	William Hall-Jones	3,091	77.68	+20.32
Independent Liberal	James Stephen Keith (Note: Note that in many newspapers, Keith is labelled as standing for the opposition)	816	20.51	
Independent Labour	Joseph Mahoney (Note: Labour candidates at the time were counted as part of the Liberal Party)	72	1.81	
Majority		2,275	57.18	+40.32
Turnout		3,979	79.29	
Registered electors		5,018		

=== 1902 election ===
1902 general election: Timaru
Party	Candidate	Votes	%	±%
Liberal	William Hall-Jones	3,046	63.60	−14.08
Conservative	Frank Smith	1,395	29.13	
Independent	Frank Isitt	348	7.27	
Majority		1,651	34.47	−22.71
Turnout		4,789	81.76	+2.47
Registered electors		5,857		

=== 1905 election ===
1905 general election: Timaru
Party	Candidate	Votes	%	±%
Liberal	William Hall-Jones	3,541	58.50	−5.10
Conservative	Frank Rolleston	2,478	40.94	
Informal votes		33	0.54	
Majority		1,063	17.56	−16.91
Turnout		6,052	84.92	+3.16
Registered electors		7,126		

== Bibliography ==
- McRobie, Alan (1989). Electoral Atlas of New Zealand. Wellington: GP Books. ISBN 0-477-01384-8.
- Wilson, James Oakley (1985) [First ed. published 1913]. New Zealand Parliamentary Record, 1840–1984 (4th ed.). Wellington: V.R. Ward, Govt. Printer. OCLC 154283103.
