= List of New Zealand electorates represented by sitting prime ministers =

This is a chronological list of parliamentary electorates in the New Zealand which were represented by sitting prime ministers.

Four prime ministers were members of the now abolished New Zealand Legislative Council and one has been a List MP. No prime minister has represented a Māori electorate.

== List ==
The following is a list of all electorates represented by sitting prime ministers:

Electorate	Prime Minister	Start	End	Notes
Christchurch	Henry Sewell	7 May 1856	20 May 1856	
Wanganui	William Fox	20 May 1856	2 June 1856	
Nelson	Edward Stafford	2 June 1856	12 July 1861	
Rangitikei	William Fox	12 July 1861	6 August 1862	
Nelson	Alfred Domett	6 August 1862	30 October 1863	
none	Frederick Whitaker	30 October 1863	24 November 1864	Member of the Legislative Council
Cheviot	Frederick Weld	24 November 1864	16 October 1865	
Nelson	Edward Stafford	16 October 1865	20 November 1868	
Timaru	Edward Stafford	20 November 1868	28 June 1869	
Rangitikei	William Fox	28 June 1869	10 September 1872	
Timaru	Edward Stafford	10 September 1872	11 October 1872	
none	George Waterhouse	11 October 1872	3 March 1873	Member of the Legislative Council
Rangitikei	William Fox	3 March 1873	8 April 1873	
Auckland East	Julius Vogel	8 April 1873	6 July 1875	
none	Daniel Pollen	6 July 1875	15 February 1876	Member of the Legislative Council
Wanganui	Julius Vogel	15 February 1876	1 September 1876	
Egmont	Harry Atkinson	1 September 1876	13 October 1877	
Thames	George Grey	13 October 1877	8 October 1879	
Selwyn	John Hall	8 October 1879	21 April 1882	
none	Frederick Whitaker	21 April 1882	25 September 1883	Member of the Legislative Council
Egmont	Harry Atkinson	25 September 1883	16 August 1884	
Dunedin East	Robert Stout	16 August 1884	28 August 1884	
Egmont	Harry Atkinson	28 August 1884	3 September 1884	
Dunedin East	Robert Stout	3 September 1884	8 October 1887	
Egmont	Harry Atkinson	8 October 1887	24 January 1891	
Wanganui	John Ballance	24 January 1891	27 April 1893	
Westland	Richard Seddon	27 April 1893	10 June 1906	
Timaru	William Hall-Jones	10 June 1906	6 August 1906	
Awarua	Joseph Ward	6 August 1906	12 March 1912	
Egmont	Thomas Mackenzie	12 March 1912	10 July 1912	
Franklin	William Massey	10 July 1912	10 May 1925	
none	Francis Bell	10 May 1925	30 May 1925	Member of the Legislative Council
Kaipara	Gordon Coates	30 May 1925	10 December 1928	
Invercargill	Joseph Ward	10 December 1928	28 May 1930	
Hurunui	George Forbes	28 May 1930	6 December 1935	
Auckland West	Michael Joseph Savage	6 December 1935	27 March 1940	
Wellington Central	Peter Fraser	27 March 1940	27 November 1946	
Brooklyn	Peter Fraser	27 November 1946	13 December 1949	
Fendalton	Sidney Holland	13 December 1949	20 September 1957	
Pahiatua	Keith Holyoake	20 September 1957	12 December 1957	
Hutt	Walter Nash	12 December 1957	12 December 1960	
Pahiatua	Keith Holyoake	12 December 1960	7 February 1972	
Karori	Jack Marshall	7 February 1972	8 December 1972	
Sydenham	Norman Kirk	8 December 1972	31 August 1974	
Onehunga	Hugh Watt	31 August 1974	6 September 1974	Acting Prime Minister
Tasman	Bill Rowling	6 September 1974	12 December 1975	
Tamaki	Robert Muldoon	12 December 1975	26 July 1984	
Mangere	David Lange	26 July 1984	8 August 1989	
Christchurch Central	Geoffrey Palmer	8 August 1989	4 September 1990	
Christchurch North	Mike Moore	4 September 1990	2 November 1990	
King Country	Jim Bolger	2 November 1990	12 October 1996	
Taranaki-King Country	Jim Bolger	12 October 1996	8 December 1997	
Rakaia	Jenny Shipley	8 December 1997	5 December 1999	
Mount Albert	Helen Clark	5 December 1999	19 November 2008	
Helensville	John Key	19 November 2008	12 December 2016	
none	Bill English	12 December 2016	26 October 2017	List MP
Mount Albert	Jacinda Ardern	26 October 2017	25 January 2023	
Remutaka	Chris Hipkins	25 January 2023	27 November 2023	
Botany	Christopher Luxon	27 November 2023	Incumbent	

== See also ==
- List of prime ministers of Canada by constituency
- List of United Kingdom Parliament constituencies represented by sitting prime ministers
