= 1890 Timaru by-election =

New Zealand by-election

- 18 August 1890
- Turnout: 868 (67.28%)
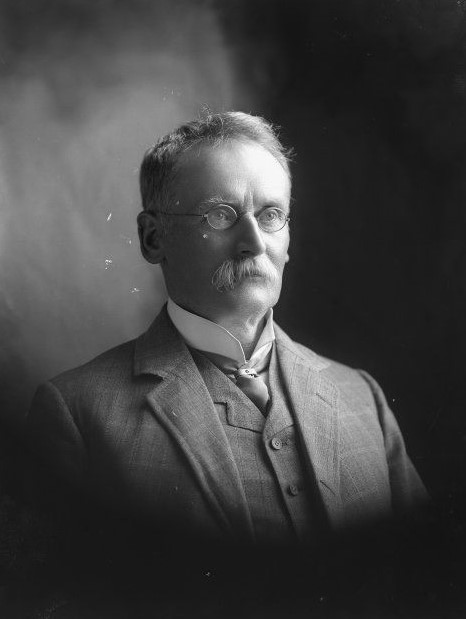

| Candidate | William Hall-Jones | Edward G. Kerr |
| Party | Independent Liberal | Independent |
| Popular vote | 422 | 344 |
| Percentage | 48.61 | 39.63 |
Member before election
Richard Turnbull
Independent
Elected Member
William Hall-Jones
Independent Liberal

The 1890 Timaru by-election was a by-election held on 18 August 1890 during the 10th New Zealand Parliament in the seat of Timaru, a partly urban seat in Canterbury on the East Coast of the South Island.

== Background ==
The by-election was triggered because of the death of sitting member of parliament Richard Turnbull. The election saw William Hall-Jones win the seat over his main opponent, Edward George Kerr.

Kerr had contested the 1887 election against Turnbull, and was the proprietor of The Timaru Herald. Former Prime Minister Sir Robert Stout was invited to contest the seat, but he declined. William Hall-Jones had initially refused nomination citing crucial upcoming business interests. However, several locals persisted and Hall-Jones eventually accepted. Jeremiah Twomey, a newspaper proprietor and owner of the Temuka Leader and Geraldine Guardian also announced his candidacy, but later retired from the race before nominations closed.

Hall-Jones, Kerr and W F Alpin were nominated, and after a show of hands went in favour of Hall-Jones a poll was demanded by the supporters of Kerr and Alpin.

== Results ==
The following table gives the election results:

1890 Timaru by-election
| Party | Candidate | Votes | % | ±% |
|---|---|---|---|---|
| Independent Liberal | William Hall-Jones | 422 | 48.61 | |
| Independent | Edward G. Kerr | 344 | 39.63 | −0.58 |
| Independent Labour | W F Alpin | 88 | 10.13 | |
| Informal votes | | 14 | 1.61 | |
| Majority | | 78 | 8.98 | |
| Turnout | | 868 | 67.28 | −0.27 |

== Bibliography ==
- Hall-Jones, Frederick G. (1969), Sir William Hall-Jones, the Last of the Old Liberals, Invercargill: Hall-Jones and Sons
