= 1878 Timaru by-election =

New Zealand by-election

The 1878 Timaru by-election was a by-election held on 8 April in the Timaru electorate during the 6th New Zealand Parliament.

The by-election was caused by the resignation of the incumbent, Edward Stafford, who was retiring from politics. He was replaced by Richard Turnbull. As he was the only candidate nominated, he was declared elected. He did not support universal manhood suffrage as proposed by Sir George Grey.
