= Francis Henry Smith =

New Zealand politician

New Zealand Parliament
| Years | Term | Electorate | Party |
|---|---|---|---|
| 1911–1914 | 18th | Waitaki | Reform |

Francis Henry Smith (1868 – 17 August 1936) was a Reform Party Member of Parliament in New Zealand.

Smith was born in 1868 at Long Bay near Strahan, Tasmania. He came to New Zealand with his parents and obtained his education at schools in Burkes Pass and Timaru.

He contested the Timaru electorate in the 1896 election, but was beaten by the incumbent, William Hall-Jones.

He was elected to the Waitaki electorate in the 1911 general election, but was defeated in 1914 for Timaru.

He died on 17 August 1936.

New Zealand Parliament
| Preceded by William Steward | Member of Parliament for Waitaki; 1911–1914 | Succeeded by John Anstey |
