= List of United Kingdom Parliament constituencies represented by sitting prime ministers =

This is a chronological list of parliamentary constituencies in the Kingdom of Great Britain and its successor state the United Kingdom which were represented by sitting prime ministers.

A majority of constituencies are or were (in the case of those abolished) in England, apart from three in Wales and six in Scotland. No prime minister has represented a constituency in Ireland or Northern Ireland.

| Constituency | County | Prime Minister | Portrait | Start | End | Notes |
|---|---|---|---|---|---|---|
| King's Lynn | (England) Norfolk | Sir Robert Walpole | | 3 April 1721 | 6 February 1742 | Regarded as the first prime minister in the modern sense. Created Earl of Orford on 6 February 1742 |
| Earl of Orford | House of Lords | The Earl of Orford | | 6 February 1742 | 11 February 1742 | See previous entry. |
| Earl of Wilmington | House of Lords | The Earl of Wilmington | | 16 February 1742 | 2 July 1743 | |
| Sussex | (England) Sussex | Henry Pelham | | 27 August 1743 | 6 March 1754 | |
| Duke of Newcastle-upon-Tyne | House of Lords | The Duke of Newcastle | | 16 March 1754 | 11 November 1756 | |
| Duke of Devonshire | House of Lords | The Duke of Devonshire | | 16 November 1756 | 29 June 1757 | |
| Duke of Newcastle-upon-Tyne | House of Lords | The Duke of Newcastle | | 29 June 1757 | 26 May 1762 | |
| Representative Peer | House of Lords | The Earl of Bute | | 26 May 1762 | 8 April 1763 | (Note: Members of the Peerage of Scotland were not automatically permitted to sit in the House of Lords until the passing of the Peerage Act 1963. Up to that point, Scottish peers could only sit in the House of Lords if they were elected as one of the sixteen Representative Peers, or if they held, in addition to their Scottish peerage, an additional title in either the Peerage of Great Britain or the Peerage of the United Kingdom. Following the passing of the Peerage Act, all Scottish peers were given the right to a seat in the House of Lords. This right lasted until the passing of the House of Lords Act 1999.) |
| Buckingham | (England) Buckinghamshire | George Grenville | | 16 April 1763 | 10 July 1765 | |
| Marquess of Rockingham | House of Lords | The Marquess of Rockingham | | 13 July 1765 | 30 July 1766 | |
| Bath | (England) Somerset | William Pitt the Elder | | 30 July 1766 | 4 August 1766 | Pitt "kissed hands" as a commoner on 30 July 1766. He chose to become Lord Privy Seal, and was created Earl of Chatham on 4 August 1766. |
| Earl of Chatham | House of Lords | The Earl of Chatham | | 4 August 1766 | 14 October 1768 | See previous entry. |
| Duke of Grafton | House of Lords | The Duke of Grafton | | 14 October 1768 | 28 January 1770 | |
| Banbury | (England) Oxfordshire | Lord North | | 28 January 1770 | 27 March 1782 | |
| Marquess of Rockingham | House of Lords | The Marquess of Rockingham | | 27 March 1782 | 1 July 1782 | |
| Baron Wycombe | House of Lords | The Earl of Shelburne | | 4 July 1782 | 26 March 1783 | (Note: Members of the Peerage of Ireland were not automatically permitted to sit in the House of Lords. Only Irish peers that had been elected as one of 28 Representative Peers (from 1801 to 1921), or those that held, in addition to their Irish peerage, an additional title in either the Peerage of Great Britain or the Peerage of the United Kingdom. This lasted until the passage of the House of Lords Act 1999. However, those Irish peers that were not entitled to a seat in the House of Lords were entitled to stand for election to the House of Commons.) |
| Duke of Portland | House of Lords | The Duke of Portland | | 2 April 1783 | 18 December 1783 | |
| Appleby | (England) Westmorland | William Pitt the Younger | | 19 December 1783 | 3 April 1784 | |
| Cambridge University | (England) Cambridgeshire | William Pitt the Younger | | 3 April 1784 | 14 March 1801 | Chose to stand for different constituency |
| Devizes | (England) Wiltshire | Henry Addington | | 17 March 1801 | 10 May 1804 | |
| Cambridge University | (England) Cambridgeshire | William Pitt the Younger | | 10 May 1804 | 23 January 1806 | |
| Baron Grenville | House of Lords | The Lord Grenville | | 11 February 1806 | 25 March 1807 | |
| Duke of Portland | House of Lords | The Duke of Portland | | 31 March 1807 | 4 October 1809 | |
| Northampton | (England) Northamptonshire | Spencer Perceval | | 4 October 1809 | 11 May 1812 | Perceval was shot and killed in the lobby of the House of Commons. He is the only British prime minister to have been assassinated. |
| Earl of Liverpool | House of Lords | The Earl of Liverpool | | 8 June 1812 | 9 April 1827 | |
| Seaford | (England) Sussex | George Canning | | 20 April 1827 | 8 August 1827 | Chose to stand for different constituency |
| Viscount Goderich | House of Lords | The Viscount Goderich | | 31 August 1827 | 8 January 1828 | |
| Duke of Wellington | House of Lords | The Duke of Wellington | | 22 January 1828 | 16 November 1830 | |
| Earl Grey | House of Lords | The Earl Grey | | 22 November 1830 | 9 July 1834 | |
| Baron Melbourne | House of Lords | The Viscount Melbourne | | 16 July 1834 | 14 November 1834 | |
| Duke of Wellington | House of Lords | The Duke of Wellington | | 17 November 1834 | 9 December 1834 | |
| Tamworth | (England) Staffordshire | Sir Robert Peel, Bt. | | 10 December 1834 | 8 April 1835 | |
| Baron Melbourne | House of Lords | The Viscount Melbourne | | 18 April 1835 | 30 August 1841 | |
| Tamworth | (England) Staffordshire | Sir Robert Peel, Bt. | | 30 August 1841 | 29 June 1846 | |
| City of London | (England) City of London | Lord John Russell | | 30 June 1846 | 21 February 1852 | Later created Earl Russell on 27 July 1861 |
| Earl of Derby | House of Lords | The Earl of Derby | | 23 February 1852 | 17 December 1852 | |
| Viscount Gordon | House of Lords | The Earl of Aberdeen | | 19 December 1852 | 30 January 1855 | |
| Tiverton | (England) Devon | The Viscount Palmerston | | 6 February 1855 | 19 February 1858 | |
| Earl of Derby | House of Lords | The Earl of Derby | | 20 February 1858 | 11 June 1859 | |
| Tiverton | (England) Devon | The Viscount Palmerston | | 12 June 1859 | 18 October 1865 | |
| Earl Russell | House of Lords | The Earl Russell | | 29 October 1865 | 26 June 1866 | Previously Lord John Russell. |
| Earl of Derby | House of Lords | The Earl of Derby | | 28 June 1866 | 25 February 1868 | |
| Buckinghamshire | (England) Buckinghamshire | Benjamin Disraeli | | 27 February 1868 | 1 December 1868 | |
| Greenwich | (England) Kent | William Ewart Gladstone | | 3 December 1868 | 17 February 1874 | |
| Buckinghamshire | (England) Buckinghamshire | Benjamin Disraeli | | 20 February 1874 | 21 August 1876 | Created Earl of Beaconsfield on 21 August 1876 |
| Earl of Beaconsfield | House of Lords | The Earl of Beaconsfield | | 21 August 1876 | 21 April 1880 | See previous entry. |
| Midlothian | (Scotland) Edinburgh | William Ewart Gladstone | | 23 April 1880 | 9 June 1885 | |
| Marquess of Salisbury | House of Lords | The Marquess of Salisbury | | 23 June 1885 | 28 January 1886 | |
| Midlothian | (Scotland) Edinburgh | William Ewart Gladstone | | 1 February 1886 | 20 July 1886 | |
| Marquess of Salisbury | House of Lords | The Marquess of Salisbury | | 25 July 1886 | 11 August 1892 | |
| Midlothian | (Scotland) Edinburgh | William Ewart Gladstone | | 15 August 1892 | 2 March 1894 | |
| Baron Rosebery | House of Lords | The Earl of Rosebery | | 5 March 1894 | 22 June 1895 | |
| Marquess of Salisbury | House of Lords | The Marquess of Salisbury | | 25 June 1895 | 11 July 1902 | |
| Manchester East | (England) Lancashire | Arthur Balfour | | 12 July 1902 | 4 December 1905 | |
| Stirling Burghs | (Scotland) Stirlingshire | Sir Henry Campbell-Bannerman | | 5 December 1905 | 5 April 1908 | |
| Stirling Burghs | (Scotland) Perthshire | Sir Henry Campbell-Bannerman | | 5 December 1905 | 5 April 1908 | |
| Stirling Burghs | (Scotland) Fife | Sir Henry Campbell-Bannerman | | 5 December 1905 | 5 April 1908 | |
| Stirling Burghs | (Scotland) Linlithgowshire | Sir Henry Campbell-Bannerman | | 5 December 1905 | 5 April 1908 | |
| Fife East | (Scotland) Fife | H. H. Asquith | | 5 April 1908 | 5 December 1916 | |
| Caernarvon Boroughs | (Wales) Caernarfon | David Lloyd George | | 6 December 1916 | 19 October 1922 | |
| Glasgow Central | (Scotland) Glasgow | Bonar Law | | 23 October 1922 | 20 May 1923 | |
| Bewdley | (England) Worcestershire | Stanley Baldwin | | 22 May 1923 | 22 January 1924 | |
| Aberavon | (Wales) Glamorgan | Ramsay MacDonald | | 22 January 1924 | 4 November 1924 | |
| Bewdley | (England) Worcestershire | Stanley Baldwin | | 4 November 1924 | 4 June 1929 | |
| Seaham | (England) County Durham | Ramsay MacDonald | | 5 June 1929 | 7 June 1935 | |
| Bewdley | (England) Worcestershire | Stanley Baldwin | | 7 June 1935 | 28 May 1937 | |
| Birmingham Edgbaston | (England) Warwickshire | Neville Chamberlain | | 28 May 1937 | 10 May 1940 | |
| Epping | (England) Essex | Winston Churchill | | 10 May 1940 | 5 July 1945 | Constituency abolished effective with 1945 general election |
| Woodford | (England) Essex | Winston Churchill | | 5 July 1945 | 26 July 1945 | |
| Limehouse | (England) County of London | Clement Attlee | | 26 July 1945 | 23 February 1950 | Constituency abolished effective with 1950 general election |
| Walthamstow West | (England) Essex | Clement Attlee | | 23 February 1950 | 26 October 1951 | |
| Woodford | (England) Essex | Winston Churchill | | 26 October 1951 | 5 April 1955 | |
| Warwick and Leamington | (England) Warwickshire | Anthony Eden | | 6 April 1955 | 9 January 1957 | |
| Bromley | (England) Kent | Harold Macmillan | | 10 January 1957 | 18 October 1963 | |
| Earl of Home | House of Lords | The Earl of Home | | 19 October 1963 | 22 October 1963 | Douglas-Home was the Earl of Home when he became prime minister and renounced his peerage four days later to stand for the House of Commons. |
| Prime minister outside Parliament | | Alec Douglas-Home | | 23 October 1963 | 7 November 1963 | Douglas-Home was in neither House of Parliament and during an active parliament, briefly for twenty days. He was elected in by-election on 8 November 1963, but did not take his seat until 12 November. |
| Kinross and Western Perthshire | (Scotland) Kinross-shire | Alec Douglas-Home | | 8 November 1963 | 16 October 1964 | |
| Kinross and Western Perthshire | (Scotland) Perthshire | Alec Douglas-Home | | 8 November 1963 | 16 October 1964 | |
| Huyton | (England) Lancashire | Harold Wilson | | 16 October 1964 | 19 June 1970 | |
| Bexley | (England) Greater London | Edward Heath | | 19 June 1970 | 28 February 1974 | Constituency abolished effective with February 1974 general election |
| Sidcup | (England) Greater London | Edward Heath | | 28 February 1974 | 4 March 1974 | Heath was elected for Sidcup and did not resign as prime minister for several days while he attempted to form a coalition. |
| Huyton | (England) Merseyside | Harold Wilson | | 4 March 1974 | 5 April 1976 | |
| Cardiff South East | (Wales) South Glamorgan | James Callaghan | | 5 April 1976 | 4 May 1979 | |
| Finchley | (England) Greater London | Margaret Thatcher | | 4 May 1979 | 28 November 1990 | |
| Huntingdon | (England) Cambridgeshire | John Major | | 28 November 1990 | 2 May 1997 | |
| Sedgefield | (England) County Durham | Tony Blair | | 2 May 1997 | 27 June 2007 | |
| Kirkcaldy and Cowdenbeath | (Scotland) Fife | Gordon Brown | | 27 June 2007 | 11 May 2010 | |
| Witney | (England) Oxfordshire | David Cameron | | 11 May 2010 | 13 July 2016 | |
| Maidenhead | (England) Berkshire | Theresa May | Theresa May (2016) (cropped) | 13 July 2016 | 24 July 2019 | |
| Uxbridge and South Ruislip | (England) Greater London | Boris Johnson | Boris Johnson official portrait (cropped) | 24 July 2019 | 6 September 2022 | Had previously served as MP for Henley |
| South West Norfolk | (England) Norfolk | Liz Truss | Liz Truss official portrait (cropped)2 | 6 September 2022 | 25 October 2022 | |
| Richmond (Yorks) | (England) North Yorkshire | Rishi Sunak | Portrait of Prime Minister Rishi Sunak (cropped) | 25 October 2022 | 4 July 2024 | Constituency abolished effective with 2024 general election |
| Richmond and Northallerton | (England) North Yorkshire | Rishi Sunak | Portrait of Prime Minister Rishi Sunak (cropped) | 4 July 2024 | 5 July 2024 | Sunak was elected for Richmond and Northallerton and resigned as prime minister the next day. |
| Holborn and St Pancras | (England) Greater London | Sir Keir Starmer | | 5 July 2024 | 20 July 2026 | |
| Makerfield | (England) Greater Manchester | Andy Burnham | | 20 July 2026 | Incumbent | Had previously served as MP for Leigh |

== See also ==
- List of prime ministers of Canada by constituency
- List of New Zealand electorates represented by sitting prime ministers
