= 1868 Timaru by-election =

New Zealand by-election

The 1868 Timaru by-election was a by-election held on 20 November in the Timaru electorate during the 4th New Zealand Parliament.

The by-election was caused by the resignation of the incumbent, Alfred Cox through ill-health. He was replaced by Edward Stafford. As Stafford was the only candidate, he was declared elected unopposed.
