= Timaru (electorate) =

Timaru was a parliamentary electorate, in New Zealand's South Island. It existed continuously from 1861 to 1996 and was represented by eleven Members of Parliament.

== Population centres ==
In the 1860 electoral redistribution, the House of Representatives increased the number of representatives by 12, reflecting the immense population growth since the original electorates were established in 1853. The redistribution created 15 additional electorates with between one and three members, and Timaru was one of the single-member electorates. The electorates were distributed to provinces so that every province had at least two members. Within each province, the number of registered electors by electorate varied greatly. The Timaru electorate had 121 registered electors for the 1861 election.

The electorate is partly urban, and is based on the South Canterbury city of Timaru.

== History ==
The electorate was formed in 1861 for the 3rd Parliament and existed continuously until the 1996 election.

Francis Jollie was the first representative. In the 1866 election, he successfully stood for Gladstone. Alfred Cox was the next representative. At the nomination meeting, Nathan Fisher was put forward as a candidate but he declined to stand, and Cox was declared elected unopposed. Cox resigned in 1868 partway through the term. Edward Stafford won the resulting 1868 by-election. He represented the electorate for a decade and resigned in 1878.

Richard Turnbull won the 1878 by-election and represented Timaru until 1890, when he died on 17 July. He had contested the 1887 election against Edward George Kerr, the proprietor of The Timaru Herald, and had won with a comfortable majority.

William Hall-Jones won the 1890 by-election. He became Prime Minister during his term, and retired in 1908.

James Craigie was the next representative, from the 1908 election. He retired in 1922. Craigie was succeeded by Frank Rolleston, who was defeated at the 1928 election.

From 1928 to 1985, the seat was held by two Labour MPs: Rev Clyde Carr a Christian minister who was a supporter of John A. Lee and remained a backbencher; and then Sir Basil Arthur a hereditary baronet and later Speaker of the House.

David Lange recalled in My Life (2005) the death of Sir Basil, and also that Labour lost the subsequent 1985 by-election when "the Labour Party organisation insisted on the selection of a candidate who could hardly be less suited to the place" and "was a good lawyer but she did not live in Timaru, and her opinions, and even her appearance, were at odds with the conservative character of the electorate." Jim Sutton won the seat back for Labour in 1993.

=== Members of Parliament ===
Key

Independent Independent Liberal Liberal Reform Labour National

| Election | Winner |
| 1861 election | Francis Jollie |
| 1866 election | Alfred Cox |
| 1868 by-election | Edward Stafford |
| 1871 election | Edward Stafford |
| 1875 election | Edward Stafford |
| 1878 by-election | Richard Turnbull |
| 1879 election | Richard Turnbull |
| 1881 election | Richard Turnbull |
| 1884 election | Richard Turnbull |
| 1887 election | Richard Turnbull |
| 1890 by-election | William Hall-Jones |
| 1890 election | William Hall-Jones |
| 1893 election | William Hall-Jones |
| 1896 election | William Hall-Jones |
| 1899 election | William Hall-Jones |
| 1902 election | William Hall-Jones |
| 1905 election | William Hall-Jones |
| 1908 election | James Craigie |
| 1911 election | James Craigie |
| 1914 election | James Craigie |
| 1919 election | James Craigie |
| 1922 election | Frank Rolleston |
| 1925 election | Frank Rolleston |
| 1928 election | Clyde Carr |
| 1931 election | Clyde Carr |
| 1935 election | Clyde Carr |
| 1938 election | Clyde Carr |
| 1943 election | Clyde Carr |
| 1946 election | Clyde Carr |
| 1949 election | Clyde Carr |
| 1951 election | Clyde Carr |
| 1954 election | Clyde Carr |
| 1957 election | Clyde Carr |
| 1960 election | Clyde Carr |
| 1962 by-election | Sir Basil Arthur |
| 1963 election | Sir Basil Arthur |
| 1966 election | Sir Basil Arthur |
| 1969 election | Sir Basil Arthur |
| 1972 election | Sir Basil Arthur |
| 1975 election | Sir Basil Arthur |
| 1978 election | Sir Basil Arthur |
| 1981 election | Sir Basil Arthur |
| 1984 election | Sir Basil Arthur |
| 1985 by-election | Maurice McTigue |
| 1987 election | Maurice McTigue |
| 1990 election | Maurice McTigue |
| 1993 election | Jim Sutton |
(Electorate abolished in 1996; see Aoraki)

== Election results ==
=== 1993 election ===
1993 general election: Timaru
| Party | Candidate | Votes | % | ±% |
|---|---|---|---|---|
| Labour | Jim Sutton | 10,153 | 46.96 | |
| National | Maurice McTigue | 7,213 | 33.36 | −18.02 |
| Alliance | Peter Binns | 2,533 | 11.71 | +3.18 |
| NZ First | Jenny Bloxham | 1,459 | 6.74 | |
| Christian Heritage | S Brodie | 200 | 0.92 | |
| Natural Law | S Sole | 59 | 0.27 | |
| Majority | | 2,940 | 13.60 | |
| Turnout | | 21,617 | 86.80 | +0.19 |
| Registered electors | | 24,902 | | |

=== 1990 election ===
1990 general election: Timaru
| Party | Candidate | Votes | % | ±% |
|---|---|---|---|---|
| National | Maurice McTigue | 10,471 | 51.38 | +0.77 |
| Labour | Gary Clarke | 7,279 | 35.72 | −10.90 |
| Green | Peter Binns | 1,739 | 8.53 | |
| NewLabour | Eveline Glanville | 674 | 3.30 | |
| Democrats | David Wood | 213 | 1.04 | |
| Majority | | 3,192 | 15.66 | +11.67 |
| Turnout | | 20,376 | 86.61 | −4.47 |
| Registered electors | | 23,526 | | |

=== 1987 election ===
1987 general election: Timaru
| Party | Candidate | Votes | % | ±% |
|---|---|---|---|---|
| National | Maurice McTigue | 10,870 | 50.61 | +7.94 |
| Labour | Gary Clarke | 10,013 | 46.62 | |
| Democrats | Lynley Simmons | 488 | 2.27 | −5.14 |
| Independent | Stanley Lusby | 53 | 0.24 | |
| NZ Party | McGregor Simpson | 53 | 0.24 | |
| Majority | | 857 | 3.99 | −2.80 |
| Turnout | | 21,477 | 91.08 | +1.09 |
| Registered electors | | 23,580 | | |

=== 1985 by-election ===
1985 Timaru by-election
| Party | Candidate | Votes | % | ±% |
|---|---|---|---|---|
| National | Maurice McTigue | 9,371 | 42.67 | +4.22 |
| Labour | Jan Walker | 7,879 | 35.88 | |
| NZ Party | Bill Greenslade | 2,998 | 13.65 | |
| Social Credit | Lynley Simmons | 1,628 | 7.41 | +2.10 |
| Values | Jamie Luck | 54 | 0.25 | |
| Independent Labour | Alan Falloon | 31 | 0.14 | |
| Majority | | 1,492 | 6.79 | |
| Informal votes | | 66 | 0.29 | |
| Turnout | | 22,027 | 89.99 | −3.19 |
| Registered electors | | 24,476 | | |
| National gain from Labour | | Swing | | |

=== 1984 election ===
1984 general election: Timaru
| Party | Candidate | Votes | % | ±% |
|---|---|---|---|---|
| Labour | Sir Basil Arthur | 11,033 | 48.13 | +3.96 |
| National | Maurice McTigue | 8,814 | 38.45 | |
| NZ Party | Christine Musgrave | 1,855 | 8.09 | |
| Social Credit | Lynley Simmons | 1,217 | 5.31 | −14.06 |
| Majority | | 2,224 | 9.70 | +0.78 |
| Turnout | | 22,919 | 93.18 | +3.16 |
| Registered electors | | 24,594 | | |

=== 1981 election ===
1981 general election: Timaru
| Party | Candidate | Votes | % | ±% |
|---|---|---|---|---|
| Labour | Sir Basil Arthur | 9,281 | 44.77 | −3.98 |
| National | Jane Coughlan | 7,431 | 35.85 | |
| Social Credit | Lynley Simmons | 4,015 | 19.37 | |
| Majority | | 1,850 | 8.92 | −1.74 |
| Turnout | | 20,727 | 90.02 | +11.73 |
| Registered electors | | 23,024 | | |

=== 1978 election ===
1978 general election: Timaru
| Party | Candidate | Votes | % | ±% |
|---|---|---|---|---|
| Labour | Sir Basil Arthur | 9,977 | 48.75 | +1.27 |
| National | Bill Penno | 7,794 | 38.08 | |
| Social Credit | Ted Rapsey | 2,180 | 10.65 | |
| Values | Laurie Durand | 512 | 2.50 | |
| Majority | | 2,183 | 10.66 | +5.22 |
| Turnout | | 20,463 | 78.29 | −5.80 |
| Registered electors | | 26,135 | | |

=== 1975 election ===
1975 general election: Timaru
| Party | Candidate | Votes | % | ±% |
|---|---|---|---|---|
| Labour | Sir Basil Arthur | 8,815 | 47.48 | −10.77 |
| National | Dave Walker | 7,804 | 42.04 | +7.39 |
| Social Credit | Ted Rapsey | 1,140 | 6.14 | |
| Values | Mary Mold | 803 | 4.32 | |
| Majority | | 1,011 | 5.44 | −18.16 |
| Turnout | | 18,562 | 84.09 | −6.10 |
| Registered electors | | 22,072 | | |

=== 1972 election ===
1972 general election: Timaru
| Party | Candidate | Votes | % | ±% |
|---|---|---|---|---|
| Labour | Sir Basil Arthur | 9,760 | 58.25 | +2.24 |
| National | Dave Walker | 5,806 | 34.65 | +2.90 |
| Social Credit | Jenny Body | 599 | 3.57 | |
| Values | Philip Lister | 403 | 2.40 | |
| New Democratic | David Armstrong | 186 | 1.11 | |
| Majority | | 3,954 | 23.60 | +5.15 |
| Turnout | | 16,754 | 90.19 | +0.01 |
| Registered electors | | 18,575 | | |

=== 1969 election ===
1969 general election: Timaru
| Party | Candidate | Votes | % | ±% |
|---|---|---|---|---|
| Labour | Sir Basil Arthur | 9,412 | 56.01 | +0.95 |
| National | Dave Walker | 6,311 | 37.55 | |
| Social Credit | Maurice Hayes | 1,084 | 6.44 | −2.58 |
| Majority | | 3,101 | 18.45 | −0.71 |
| Turnout | | 16,807 | 90.18 | +1.46 |
| Registered electors | | 18,636 | | |

=== 1966 election ===
1966 general election: Timaru
| Party | Candidate | Votes | % | ±% |
|---|---|---|---|---|
| Labour | Sir Basil Arthur | 8,929 | 55.06 | −1.28 |
| National | Norman Stanley Brown | 5,821 | 35.90 | |
| Social Credit | Maurice Hayes | 1,464 | 9.02 | +4.62 |
| Majority | | 3,108 | 19.16 | +2.08 |
| Turnout | | 16,214 | 88.72 | −2.83 |
| Registered electors | | 18,274 | | |

=== 1963 election ===
1963 general election: Timaru
| Party | Candidate | Votes | % | ±% |
|---|---|---|---|---|
| Labour | Sir Basil Arthur | 9,334 | 56.34 | +3.79 |
| National | Maurice John O'Reilly | 6,503 | 39.25 | |
| Social Credit | Maurice Hayes | 729 | 4.40 | +0.43 |
| Majority | | 2,831 | 17.08 | +8.02 |
| Turnout | | 16,566 | 91.55 | +7.76 |
| Registered electors | | 18,094 | | |

=== 1962 by-election ===
1962 Timaru by-election
| Party | Candidate | Votes | % | ±% |
|---|---|---|---|---|
| Labour | Sir Basil Arthur | 7,578 | 52.55 | |
| National | Derek Quigley | 6,271 | 43.49 | |
| Social Credit | Maurice Hayes | 572 | 3.97 | |
| Majority | | 1,307 | 9.06 | |
| Informal votes | | 34 | 0.24 | |
| Turnout | | 14,455 | 83.79 | −7.62 |
| Registered electors | | 17,252 | | |
| Labour hold | | Swing | | |

=== 1960 election ===
1960 general election: Timaru
| Party | Candidate | Votes | % | ±% |
|---|---|---|---|---|
| Labour | Clyde Carr | 7,617 | 49.11 | −4.60 |
| National | Ronald Erle White | 7,260 | 46.81 | |
| Social Credit | Francis C. Isitt | 542 | 3.49 | −0.11 |
| Independent | J R Rae | 90 | 0.58 | |
| Majority | | 357 | 2.30 | −16.63 |
| Turnout | | 15,509 | 91.41 | −2.94 |
| Registered electors | | 16,966 | | |

=== 1957 election ===
1957 general election: Timaru
| Party | Candidate | Votes | % | ±% |
|---|---|---|---|---|
| Labour | Clyde Carr | 8,379 | 53.71 | +8.85 |
| National | Alfred Davey | 6,657 | 42.67 | |
| Social Credit | Francis C. Isitt | 562 | 3.60 | |
| Majority | | 2,954 | 18.93 | +8.71 |
| Turnout | | 15,598 | 94.35 | +0.89 |
| Registered electors | | 16,532 | | |

=== 1954 election ===
1954 general election: Timaru
| Party | Candidate | Votes | % | ±% |
|---|---|---|---|---|
| Labour | Clyde Carr | 6,241 | 44.86 | −7.16 |
| National | Vic Wilson | 4,818 | 34.63 | |
| Social Credit | George Edmonds | 2,853 | 20.50 | |
| Majority | | 1,423 | 10.22 | +6.19 |
| Turnout | | 13,912 | 93.46 | +1.78 |
| Registered electors | | 14,884 | | |

=== 1951 election ===
1951 general election: Timaru
| Party | Candidate | Votes | % | ±% |
|---|---|---|---|---|
| Labour | Clyde Carr | 7,265 | 52.02 | −0.97 |
| National | William Leslie Richards | 6,701 | 47.98 | |
| Majority | | 564 | 4.03 | −1.95 |
| Turnout | | 13,966 | 91.68 | −3.31 |
| Registered electors | | 15,233 | | |

=== 1949 election ===
1949 general election: Timaru
| Party | Candidate | Votes | % | ±% |
|---|---|---|---|---|
| Labour | Clyde Carr | 7,364 | 52.99 | +1.07 |
| National | Jack Lockington | 6,532 | 47.01 | |
| Majority | | 832 | 5.98 | +2.13 |
| Turnout | | 13,896 | 94.99 | −0.01 |
| Registered electors | | 14,628 | | |

=== 1946 election ===
1946 general election: Timaru
| Party | Candidate | Votes | % | ±% |
|---|---|---|---|---|
| Labour | Clyde Carr | 7,005 | 51.92 | +1.49 |
| National | Jack Acland | 6,485 | 48.07 | |
| Majority | | 520 | 3.85 | −9.59 |
| Turnout | | 13,490 | 95.00 | −0.90 |
| Registered electors | | 14,200 | | |

=== 1943 election ===
1943 general election: Timaru
| Party | Candidate | Votes | % | ±% |
|---|---|---|---|---|
| Labour | Clyde Carr | 6,383 | 50.43 | −8.05 |
| National | Jack Satterthwaite | 4,682 | 36.99 | |
| Democratic Labour | Douglas Cresswell | 1,504 | 11.88 | |
| Informal votes | | 86 | 0.67 | +0.05 |
| Majority | | 1,701 | 13.44 | −4.16 |
| Turnout | | 12,655 | 95.90 | +0.72 |
| Registered electors | | 13,195 | | |

=== 1938 election ===
1938 general election: Timaru
| Party | Candidate | Votes | % | ±% |
|---|---|---|---|---|
| Labour | Clyde Carr | 7,296 | 58.48 | +4.07 |
| National | Bill Hall | 5,100 | 40.88 | |
| Informal votes | | 78 | 0.62 | +0.01 |
| Majority | | 2,196 | 17.60 | +8.77 |
| Turnout | | 12,474 | 95.18 | +2.81 |
| Registered electors | | 13,105 | | |

=== 1935 election ===
1935 general election: Timaru
| Party | Candidate | Votes | % | ±% |
|---|---|---|---|---|
| Labour | Clyde Carr | 6,524 | 54.41 | +5.96 |
| Independent | William Thomas (Note: Thomas ran as an independent, but was aligned to the United–Reform Coalition.) | 5,465 | 45.58 | |
| Informal votes | | 74 | 0.61 | +0.30 |
| Majority | | 1,059 | 8.83 | +1.48 |
| Turnout | | 11,989 | 92.37 | +2.06 |
| Registered electors | | 12,978 | | |

William Angland (independent) withdrew before election day.

Table footnotes:

=== 1931 election ===
1931 general election: Timaru (Note: The Reform and United parties could not agree on an official coalition candidate for the Timaru electorate, so neither Armstrong nor Hall were official candidates, and many sources show them as independents)
| Party | Candidate | Votes | % | ±% |
|---|---|---|---|---|
| Labour | Clyde Carr | 5,407 | 48.45 | −3.74 |
| Reform | Herbert N. Armstrong | 4,587 | 41.11 | |
| United | Herbert Hall | 1,165 | 10.44 | |
| Informal votes | | 35 | 0.31 | −1.68 |
| Majority | | 820 | 7.35 | +2.95 |
| Turnout | | 11,194 | 90.31 | −1.45 |
| Registered electors | | 12,395 | | |

Table footnotes:

=== 1928 election ===
1928 general election: Timaru
| Party | Candidate | Votes | % | ±% |
|---|---|---|---|---|
| Labour | Clyde Carr | 5,547 | 52.20 | |
| Reform | Frank Rolleston | 5,080 | 47.80 | −14.37 |
| Informal votes | | 216 | 1.99 | +1.17 |
| Majority | | 467 | 4.39 | |
| Turnout | | 10,843 | 91.76 | −0.76 |
| Registered electors | | 11,817 | | |

=== 1925 election ===
1925 general election: Timaru
| Party | Candidate | Votes | % | ±% |
|---|---|---|---|---|
| Reform | Frank Rolleston | 6,140 | 62.17 | +11.12 |
| Labour | Percy Vinnell | 3,654 | 37.00 | −10.93 |
| Informal votes | | 81 | 0.82 | −0.18 |
| Majority | | 2,486 | 25.17 | +22.05 |
| Turnout | | 9,875 | 92.52 | +0.91 |
| Registered electors | | 10,673 | | |

=== 1922 election ===
1922 general election: Timaru
| Party | Candidate | Votes | % | ±% |
|---|---|---|---|---|
| Reform | Frank Rolleston | 4,709 | 51.05 | |
| Labour | Percy Vinnell | 4,421 | 47.93 | +8.34 |
| Informal votes | | 93 | 1.00 | −1.01 |
| Majority | | 288 | 3.12 | |
| Turnout | | 9,223 | 91.61 | +12.75 |
| Registered electors | | 10,067 | | |

=== 1919 election ===
1919 general election: Timaru
| Party | Candidate | Votes | % | ±% |
|---|---|---|---|---|
| Independent Liberal | James Craigie | 4,717 | 58.39 | +1.65 |
| Labour | Percy Vinnell | 3,198 | 39.59 | |
| Informal votes | | 163 | 2.01 | +0.88 |
| Majority | | 1,519 | 18.80 | +4.18 |
| Turnout | | 8,078 | 78.86 | −4.79 |
| Registered electors | | 10,243 | | |

=== 1914 election ===
1914 general election: Timaru
| Party | Candidate | Votes | % | ±% |
|---|---|---|---|---|
| Liberal | James Craigie | 4,308 | 56.74 | −2.34 |
| Reform | Frank Smith | 3,198 | 42.12 | |
| Informal votes | | 86 | 1.13 | +0.76 |
| Majority | | 1,110 | 14.62 | −3.92 |
| Turnout | | 7,592 | 83.65 | +6.71 |
| Registered electors | | 9,075 | | |

=== 1911 election ===
1911 general election: Timaru, first ballot
| Party | Candidate | Votes | % | ±% |
|---|---|---|---|---|
| Liberal | James Craigie | 3,152 | 43.04 | −9.75 |
| Reform | Joseph Moore | 1,923 | 26.25 | |
| Labour | Jesse Reader | 1,636 | 22.34 | |
| Independent | William Angland | 497 | 6.78 | |
| Informal votes | | 115 | 1.57 | −1.20 |
| Turnout | | 7,323 | 85.23 | +5.60 |
| Registered electors | | 8,592 | | |
Second ballot result
| Liberal | James Craigie | 3,906 | 59.08 | +16.04 |
| Reform | Joseph Moore | 2,680 | 40.53 | +14.28 |
| Informal votes | | 25 | 0.37 | |
| Majority | | 1,226 | 18.54 | +12.56 |
| Turnout | | 6,611 | 76.94 | −8.29 |

=== 1908 election ===
1908 general election: Timaru, first ballot
| Party | Candidate | Votes | % | ±% |
|---|---|---|---|---|
| Liberal | James Craigie | 2,610 | 39.63 | |
| Conservative | William David Campbell | 2,478 | 37.63 | |
| Ind. Labour League | George Koller | 1,259 | 19.11 | |
| Independent | Joseph Mahoney | 133 | 2.01 | |
| Informal votes | | 105 | 1.59 | +1.05 |
| Turnout | | 6,585 | 82.66 | −2.26 |
| Registered electors | | 7,966 | | |
Second ballot result
| Liberal | James Craigie | 3,349 | 52.79 | +13.16 |
| Conservative | William David Campbell | 2,969 | 46.80 | +9.17 |
| Informal votes | | 26 | 0.40 | −1.19 |
| Majority | | 380 | 5.98 | |
| Turnout | | 6,344 | 79.63 | −3.03 |

=== 1905 election ===
1905 general election: Timaru
| Party | Candidate | Votes | % | ±% |
|---|---|---|---|---|
| Liberal | William Hall-Jones | 3,541 | 58.50 | −5.10 |
| Conservative | Frank Rolleston | 2,478 | 40.94 | |
| Informal votes | | 33 | 0.54 | |
| Majority | | 1,063 | 17.56 | −16.91 |
| Turnout | | 6,052 | 84.92 | +3.16 |
| Registered electors | | 7,126 | | |

=== 1902 election ===
1902 general election: Timaru
| Party | Candidate | Votes | % | ±% |
|---|---|---|---|---|
| Liberal | William Hall-Jones | 3,046 | 63.60 | −14.08 |
| Conservative | Frank Smith | 1,395 | 29.13 | |
| Independent | Frank Isitt | 348 | 7.27 | |
| Majority | | 1,651 | 34.47 | −22.71 |
| Turnout | | 4,789 | 81.76 | +2.47 |
| Registered electors | | 5,857 | | |

=== 1899 election ===
1899 general election: Timaru
| Party | Candidate | Votes | % | ±% |
|---|---|---|---|---|
| Liberal | William Hall-Jones | 3,091 | 77.68 | +20.32 |
| Independent Liberal | James Stephen Keith (Note: Note that in many newspapers, Keith is labelled as standing for the opposition) | 816 | 20.51 | |
| Independent Labour | Joseph Mahoney (Note: Labour candidates at the time were counted as part of the Liberal Party) | 72 | 1.81 | |
| Majority | | 2,275 | 57.18 | +40.32 |
| Turnout | | 3,979 | 79.29 | |
| Registered electors | | 5,018 | | |

Table footnotes:

=== 1896 election ===
1896 general election: Timaru
| Party | Candidate | Votes | % | ±% |
|---|---|---|---|---|
| Liberal | William Hall-Jones | 2,180 | 57.36 | +1.42 |
| Conservative | Frank Smith | 1,539 | 40.50 | |
| Informal votes | | 81 | 2.14 | |
| Majority | | 641 | 16.86 | +4.97 |
| Turnout | | 3,800 | | |

James Stephen Keith (independent) withdrew before election day.

=== 1893 election ===
1893 general election: Timaru
| Party | Candidate | Votes | % | ±% |
|---|---|---|---|---|
| Independent Liberal | William Hall-Jones | 1,914 | 55.94 | +24.16 |
| Liberal | Edward G. Kerr | 1,507 | 44.05 | +15.77 |
| Majority | | 407 | 11.89 | +8.39 |
| Turnout | | 3,421 | 81.22 | +20.78 |
| Registered electors | | 4,212 | | |

=== 1890 election ===
1890 general election: Timaru
| Party | Candidate | Votes | % | ±% |
|---|---|---|---|---|
| Independent Liberal | William Hall-Jones | 472 | 31.78 | −16.83 |
| Independent | Edward G. Kerr | 420 | 28.28 | −11.35 |
| Liberal | Jeremiah Twomey | 366 | 24.65 | |
| Conservative | Samuel Frederick Smithson | 218 | 14.68 | |
| Liberal | Philip E. Thoreau | 9 | 0.61 | |
| Majority | | 52 | 3.50 | −5.48 |
| Turnout | | 1,485 | 60.44 | −6.84 |
| Registered electors | | 2,457 | | |

=== 1890 by-election ===
1890 Timaru by-election
| Party | Candidate | Votes | % | ±% |
|---|---|---|---|---|
| Independent Liberal | William Hall-Jones | 422 | 48.61 | |
| Independent | Edward G. Kerr | 344 | 39.63 | −0.58 |
| Independent Labour | W F Alpin | 88 | 10.13 | |
| Informal votes | | 14 | 1.61 | |
| Majority | | 78 | 8.98 | |
| Turnout | | 868 | 67.28 | −0.27 |
