= List of prime ministers of Canada by constituency =

The following is a list of electoral districts represented by the Prime Minister of Canada during their term(s) of office. Some prime ministers represented more than one constituency during their term(s), hence the tallied numbers exceed the number of prime ministers. Moreover, two prime ministers—John Abbott and Sir Mackenzie Bowell—served their terms while a member of the Senate. Charles Tupper and John Turner were members of neither the House of Commons or the Senate during their entire terms as prime minister.

Three provinces—New Brunswick, Newfoundland and Labrador, and Prince Edward Island—have never been represented by a sitting prime minister. Mackenzie King briefly represented the Prince Edward Island riding of Prince, and Jean Chrétien even more briefly represented the New Brunswick riding of Beauséjour prior to their premierships, however. None of the three territories has been represented by a person who served as prime minister.

Two ridings have been represented by two sitting prime ministers. Both King and John Diefenbaker served Prince Albert; and both Wilfrid Laurier and Louis St. Laurent represented Quebec East. R. B. Bennett represented Calgary West during his premiership, as did Stephen Harper prior to his. Similarly, John A. Macdonald served his fourth term as MP for Carleton, a riding represented by Robert Borden as Opposition Leader in the 10th Parliament.

Electoral District	Province	Prime Minister	Portrait	Start	End	Notes
provisional		John A. Macdonald		1 July 1867	3 September 1867 (Note: The return date of election writ reporting Macdonald's election was dated September 3, 1867"Return of the Name of the Members chosen to serve in the House of Commons". Journals of the House of Commons of Canada. 1. Parliament of Canada: xii. 1867–68.)	Macdonald was appointed as the first prime minister on the date that Canada came into existence, but before the first parliamentary election was held
Kingston	Ontario	John A. Macdonald		3 September 1867	5 November 1873	Macdonald was appointed as the first prime minister on the date that Canada came into existence, but before the first parliamentary election was held
Lambton	Ontario	Alexander Mackenzie		7 November 1873	8 October 1878	
Marquette	Manitoba	John A. Macdonald		October 17, 1878	c. Nov 1878 (Note: The subsequent MP for Marquette was acclaimed on November 30, 1878.)	Defeated in his long-held Kingston in the 1878 election, but was acclaimed in Marquette and elected in Victoria; in opting to sit as MP for Victoria, bypassed requirement for ministerial by-election as balloting in BC took place later on October 21, after the formation of his ministry.
Victoria	British Columbia	John A. Macdonald		21 October 1878	20 June 1882	Defeated in his long-held Kingston in the 1878 election, but was acclaimed in Marquette and elected in Victoria; in opting to sit as MP for Victoria, bypassed requirement for ministerial by-election as balloting in BC took place later on October 21, after the formation of his ministry.
Carleton	Ontario	John A. Macdonald		20 June 1882	21 February 1887	Also elected in Lennox
Kingston	Ontario	John A. Macdonald		22 February 1887	6 June 1891	Also re-elected in Carleton
Senator for Quebec (Inkerman)		John Abbott		16 June 1891	24 November 1892	First person to serve as prime minister from the Senate
Antigonish	Nova Scotia	John Thompson		5 December 1892	12 December 1894	
Senator for Ontario		Mackenzie Bowell		21 December 1894	27 April 1896	
Cape Breton	Nova Scotia	Charles Tupper		1 May 1896	8 July 1896	Tupper was appointed as prime minister following the dissolution of the 7th Canadian Parliament but before the 1896 federal election in which his party lost. Although he was the member of Parliament for Cape Breton, he never sat in the House as prime minister as it was not in session.
Quebec East	Quebec	Wilfrid Laurier		11 July 1896	6 October 1911	also elected in Saskatchewan (Provisional District) in 1896 general election resigned the seat prior to formation of his ministry.
Wright	Quebec	Wilfrid Laurier		November 3, 1904	January 20, 1905	Elected in and held these seats at various time concurrently with Quebec East, a seat he has held continuously 1877–1919.
Ottawa	Ontario	Wilfrid Laurier		October 26, 1908	December 17, 1909	Elected in and held these seats at various time concurrently with Quebec East, a seat he has held continuously 1877–1919.
Soulanges	Quebec	Wilfrid Laurier		September 21, 1911	October 6, 1911	Elected in and held these seats at various time concurrently with Quebec East, a seat he has held continuously 1877–1919.
Halifax	Nova Scotia	Robert Borden		10 October 1911	16 December 1917	
Kings	Nova Scotia	Robert Borden		17 December 1917	10 July 1920	
Portage la Prairie	Manitoba	Arthur Meighen		10 July 1920	6 December 1921	Defeated locally while leading his party to defeat in the 1921 federal election.
extra-parliamentary while exiting as PM		Arthur Meighen		6 December 1921	29 December 1921	Defeated locally while leading his party to defeat in the 1921 federal election.
York North	Ontario	William Mackenzie King		29 December 1921	29 October 1925	Defeated locally in the 1925 federal election; held premiership while extra-parliamentary until elected MP for Prince Albert via a by-election.
extra-parliamentary		William Mackenzie King		29 October 1925	15 February 1926	Defeated locally in the 1925 federal election; held premiership while extra-parliamentary until elected MP for Prince Albert via a by-election.
Prince Albert	Saskatchewan	William Mackenzie King		15 February 1926	28 June 1926	Defeated locally in the 1925 federal election; held premiership while extra-parliamentary until elected MP for Prince Albert via a by-election.
Portage la Prairie	Manitoba	Arthur Meighen		29 June 1926	14 September 1926	Defeated locally while leading his party to defeat in the 1926 federal election.
extra-parliamentary while exiting as PM		Arthur Meighen		14 September 1926	25 September 1926	Defeated locally while leading his party to defeat in the 1926 federal election.
Prince Albert	Saskatchewan	William Mackenzie King		25 September 1926	6 August 1930	
Calgary West	Alberta	R.B. Bennett		7 August 1930	22 October 1935	
Prince Albert	Saskatchewan	William Mackenzie King		23 October 1935	11 June 1945	Defeated locally in the 1945 general election; held premiership while extra-parliamentary until elected MP for Glengarry via a by-election.
extra-parliamentary		William Mackenzie King		11 June 1945	6 August 1945	Defeated locally in the 1945 general election; held premiership while extra-parliamentary until elected MP for Glengarry via a by-election.
Glengarry	Ontario	William Mackenzie King		6 August 1945	15 November 1948	Defeated locally in the 1945 general election; held premiership while extra-parliamentary until elected MP for Glengarry via a by-election.
Quebec East	Quebec	Louis St. Laurent		15 November 1948	20 June 1957	
Prince Albert	Saskatchewan	John Diefenbaker		21 June 1957	21 April 1963	
Algoma East	Ontario	Lester B. Pearson		22 April 1963	20 April 1968	
Mount Royal	Quebec	Pierre Trudeau		20 April 1968	3 June 1979	
Yellowhead	Alberta	Joe Clark		4 June 1979	2 March 1980	
Mount Royal	Quebec	Pierre Trudeau		3 March 1980	30 June 1984	
extra-parliamentary		John Turner		30 June 1984	4 September 1984	Not a member of the Senate or the House of Commons when elected Liberal leader/appointed prime minister.
Vancouver Quadra while exiting as PM	British Columbia	John Turner		4 September 1984	17 September 1984	Elected in Vancouver Quadra in the 1984 election, ceased being prime minister prior to the opening of the 33rd Parliament.
Manicouagan	Quebec	Brian Mulroney		17 September 1984	21 November 1988	
Charlevoix	Quebec	Brian Mulroney		21 November 1988	25 June 1993	
Vancouver Centre	British Columbia	Kim Campbell		25 June 1993	25 October 1993	
extra-parliamentary while exiting as PM		Kim Campbell		25 October 1993	3 November 1993	Defeated locally while leading her party to defeat in the 1993 federal election.
Saint-Maurice	Quebec	Jean Chrétien		4 November 1993	12 December 2003	
LaSalle—Émard	Quebec	Paul Martin		12 December 2003	5 February 2006	
Calgary Southwest	Alberta	Stephen Harper		6 February 2006	19 October 2015	
Calgary Heritage	Alberta	Stephen Harper		19 October 2015	3 November 2015	while exiting as PM, left office as PM before taking seat.
Papineau	Quebec	Justin Trudeau		4 November 2015	14 March 2025	
extra-parliamentary		Mark Carney		14 March 2025	28 April 2025	Not a member of the Senate or the House of Commons when elected Liberal leader/appointed prime minister. Elected in Nepean in the 2025 election.
Nepean	Ontario	Mark Carney		28 April 2025	incumbent	Not a member of the Senate or the House of Commons when elected Liberal leader/appointed prime minister. Elected in Nepean in the 2025 election.

== Electoral Districts represented by future or former prime ministers ==
Electoral District	Province	Prime Minister	Pre/Post	Start	End	Notes
York East	Ontario	Alexander Mackenzie	Post	1882	1892	
Argenteuil	Quebec	John Abbott	Pre	1867	1874	
Argenteuil	Quebec	John Abbott	Pre	1880	1887	
Hastings North	Ontario	Sir Mackenzie Bowell	Pre	1867	1892	while member of Macdonald (II), Abbott ministries
Cumberland	Nova Scotia	Sir Charles Tupper	Pre	1867	1884	while member of Macdonald (I) & II)
Cumberland	Nova Scotia	Sir Charles Tupper	Pre	1887	1888	while member of Macdonald (I) & II)
Drummond—Arthabaska	Quebec	Sir Wilfrid Laurier	Pre	1874	1877	held until defeat in ministerial by-election
Halifax	Nova Scotia	Sir Robert Borden	Pre	1896	1904	while Leader of Opposition (from 1901)
Carleton	Ontario	Sir Robert Borden	Pre	1905	1909	while Leader of Opposition
Grenville	Ontario	Arthur Meighen	Post & Pre	1922	1925	while Leader of Opposition
Waterloo North	Ontario	W. L. Mackenzie King	Pre	1908	1911	while member of Laurier ministry
Prince	Prince Edward Island	W. L. Mackenzie King	Post & Pre	1919	1921	while Leader of Opposition
Calgary	Alberta	R. B. Bennett	Pre	1911	1917	
Lake Centre	Saskatchewan	John Diefenbaker	Pre	1940	1953	
Rocky Mountain	Alberta	Joe Clark	Pre	1972	1979	while Leader of Opposition
Kings—Hants	Nova Scotia	Joe Clark	Post	2000	2000	
Calgary Centre	Alberta	Joe Clark	Post	2000	2004	
St. Lawrence—St. George	Quebec	John Turner	Pre	1962	1968	while member of Pearson, Trudeau (I) ministries
Ottawa-Carleton	Ontario	John Turner	Pre	1968	1976	while member of Trudeau (I) ministry
Vancouver Quadra	British Columbia	John Turner	Post	1984	1993	while Leader of Opposition
Central Nova	Nova Scotia	Brian Mulroney	Pre	1983	1984	while Leader of Opposition
Saint-Maurice—Laflèche	Quebec	Jean Chrétien	Pre	1963	1968	while member of Pearson, Trudeau (I) ministries
Saint-Maurice	Quebec	Jean Chrétien	Pre	1968	1986	while member of Trudeau (I) & II) , Turner ministries
Beauséjour	New Brunswick	Jean Chrétien	Pre	1990	1993	while Leader of Opposition
Calgary West	Alberta	Stephen Harper	Pre	1993	1997	

== See also ==
- List of United Kingdom Parliament constituencies represented by sitting prime ministers
- List of New Zealand electorates represented by sitting prime ministers
