= James Craigie =

New Zealand politician (1851–1935)

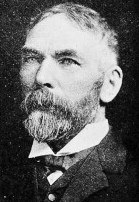

Member of the New Zealand Parliament for Timaru
- In office 1908–1922
- Preceded by: William Hall-Jones
- Succeeded by: Frank Rolleston

Personal details
- Born: 7 September 1851 Coupar Angus, Perthshire, Scotland
- Died: 17 August 1935 (aged 83) Kingsdown, South Canterbury, Timaru, New Zealand
- Party: Liberal

James Craigie (7 September 1851 – 17 August 1935) was Member of Parliament for the Timaru electorate in the South Island of New Zealand and a member of the New Zealand Legislative Council. He was also Chairman of the South Canterbury Health Board, Chairman of the Timaru Harbour Board, a Timaru Borough Councillor and Mayor of Timaru.

== Early life ==
James Craigie was born in Coupar Angus, Perthshire, Scotland, on 7 September 1851.

He came to New Zealand in 1867 with his parents, James and Agnes Craigie (née McFarlane).

Craigie and his family landed in Dunedin, where he remained for several years after completing an apprenticeship as a painter and decorator.

Craigie married Catherine Orr from County Donegal, Ireland and they had six daughters and one son.

== Move to Timaru ==
Craigie moved to Timaru in 1873 where he started a glass and house decoration business. He also opened a large home decoration shop in Cains Terrace, Timaru. He subsequently merged his business with a Dunedin firm and it became known as Smith & Craigie. The merged business would ultimately become part of Smith & Smith, a company which continues to operate throughout New Zealand.

As his business success grew, Craigie purchased a large farm in Kingsdown, about 5 km south of Timaru, where he built a substantial house, Craigielea. Craigielea was subsequently destroyed by fire.

Craigie served on the South Canterbury Health Board for nine years, serving the last several years as Chairman.

He also served as Chairman of the Timaru Harbour Board for four years during which time significant progress was made in the development of the Port of Timaru.

== Election to the Timaru Borough Council ==
Craigie was elected to the Timaru Borough Council in 1901.

== Mayor of Timaru ==
Craigie was Mayor of Timaru for ten years from 1902 to 1913.

== Member of Parliament ==
New Zealand Parliament
Years	Term	Electorate	Party
1908–1911	17th	Timaru	Liberal
1911–1914	18th	Timaru	Liberal
1914–1919	19th	Timaru	Liberal
1919–1922	20th	Timaru	Independent Liberal

James Craigie represented the Timaru electorate in the New Zealand House of Representatives for 14 years from 1908 to 1922.

=== Independent Liberal ===
In the 1919 election, Craigie broke from the Liberal Party and stood as an Independent Liberal or Progressive Liberal.

After retiring as a Member of Parliament Craigie was appointed to the Legislative Council on 1 June 1923. He served for one term until 31 May 1930 and was not re-appointed.

In 1935, Craigie was awarded the King George V Silver Jubilee Medal.

== Admirer of Robert Burns ==
Craigie was an enthusiastic admirer of Robert Burns and was at one-time regarded as New Zealand's leading authority on Burns.

Craigie was an Overseas Vice President of the Robert Burns World Federation.

In 1931, Craigie delivered a lecture to the Wellington Burns Club entitled "The Humanity of Robert Burns".

Craigie provided funds for the erection in the Timaru Botanic Gardens of a statute of Robert Burns. The statue was unveiled by Craigie before a huge crowd on 28 May 1913.

== Death ==
James Craigie died at his home Craigilea in Kingsdown, South Canterbury on 17 August 1935 due to “heart weakness”. He is buried in the Craigie Family Plot in Timaru Cemetery.

== Legacy ==
Craigie was a generous benefactor to his adopted hometown of Timaru.

He provided the chimes for the Timaru Town Clock in 1913. This was initially hung in the Chief Post Office but in 1933 it was moved to the Timaru Council Building, which had been constructed during Craigie's tenure as Mayor.

Craigie provided the money for the oak trees planted in (what was to become known as) Craigie Avenue, Timaru now part of New Zealand State Highway 1. The double row of trees were planted on 12 October 1905. He also donated ten pounds for the building of the Catholic Sacred Heart Basilica, also located in Craigie Avenue, on 8 February 1910, the day the foundation stone for the church was laid.

In 1914 Craigie presented the renowned painting “The Mother” by Thomas Kennington to the South Canterbury Art Society. After his death, the Craigie family donated a C.F. Goldie painting "Memories. The Last of her Tribe” (painted in 1913) to the people of Timaru. Both paintings can be seen at the Aigantighe Art Gallery in Wai-iti Road, Timaru.

His descendants planted a tree in his honour in Craigie Avenue at Easter, 1994.

== Notes ==
Political offices
Preceded by Charles Macintosh	Mayor of Timaru; 1902–1912	Succeeded by Tom Hawkey
New Zealand Parliament
Preceded by William Hall-Jones	Member of Parliament for Timaru; 1908–1922	Succeeded by Frank Rolleston
