= John Hall-Jones =

New Zealand historian (1927–2015)

John Hall-Jones OBE
- Born: 14 September 1927
- Died: 19 November 2015 (aged 88)
- Education: University of Otago
- Spouse: Pamela Grace Middleton Simpson
- Relatives: Fred Hall-Jones (father); William Hall-Jones (grandfather); John Turnbull Thomson (great-grandfather)

John Hall-Jones OBE (14 September 1927 – 19 November 2015) was a New Zealand historian, otolaryngologist and outdoorsman. Jones concentrated on the history of Southland and Otago, New Zealand's southernmost regions, as well as the New Zealand Subantarctic Islands.

Born in 1927, Hall-Jones was the great–grandson of John Turnbull Thomson (1821–1884), a British architect and civil engineer who was the original surveyor of the city of Invercargill, the grandson of New Zealand prime minister Sir William Hall-Jones, and the son of Fred Hall-Jones, a community leader and historian. He studied medicine at the University of Otago, graduating MB ChB in 1953, and then undertook postgraduate training in London. Until his retirement at the age of 60, Hall-Jones was a practising otolaryngologist, and made a significant contribution to postgraduate medical education in Southland.

An avid outdoorsman, much of Hall–Jones's writing focused on the natural history and wilderness areas of southern New Zealand. He also published works on the history of Antarctica, the Himalayas, Patagonia, and the Rocky Mountains. Hall-Jones would often begin research for his books by exploring the wilderness of an area by flying, kayaking, trekking or camping in a region. He would write during the winters when the weather was colder. In all he published 34 historical books.

In the 1995 New Year Honours, Hall-Jones was appointed an Officer of the Order of the British Empire, for services to medicine and local history. In 2007, he was awarded an honorary Doctor of Laws degree by the University of Otago. He won the J.M. Sherrard Award for regional histories for two of his books, Fiordland Explored and Bluff Harbour. His The Fjords of Fiordland was a finalist in the 2003 Montana Book Awards, while Goldfields of the South was a Sir James Wattie Book award finalist.

In 2015, he published his autobiography, A Life of Adventures, just a few months before his death. He died on 19 November 2015, at the age of 88.
