= Richard Turnbull (politician) =

New Zealand politician (1826–1890)

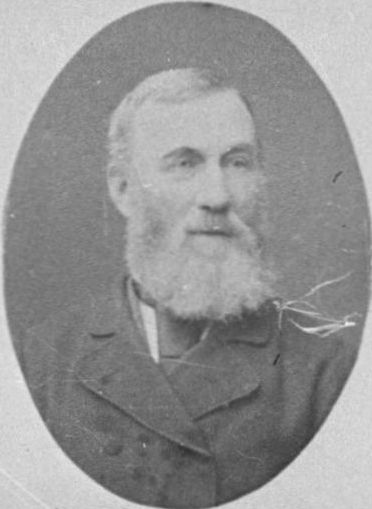
- Richard Turnbull in 1882

Member of the New Zealand House of Representatives
- In office 8 April 1878 – 17 July 1890
- Preceded by: Edward Stafford
- Succeeded by: William Hall-Jones

Personal details
- Born: 1826 Oxford, England
- Died: 17 July 1890 (aged 63–64)

Richard Turnbull (1826 – 17 July 1890) was a 19th-century member of parliament in Canterbury, New Zealand. Born in Oxford, England, he moved to New Zealand in 1851, initially taking up farming near Christchurch. In 1864, he moved to Timaru and established a series of businesses in the town, using his influence to advocate for the construction of a port.

He represented the Timaru electorate from 1878 to his death from Bright's disease in July 1890.

New Zealand Parliament
Years	Term	Electorate	Party
1878–1879	6th	Timaru	Independent
1879–1881	7th	Timaru	Independent
1881–1884	8th	Timaru	Independent
1884–1887	9th	Timaru	Independent
1887–1890	10th	Timaru	Independent

New Zealand Parliament
Preceded by Edward Stafford	Member of Parliament for Timaru; 1878–1890	Succeeded by William Hall-Jones
