= Jeremiah Twomey =

New Zealand politician and journalist (1847–1921)

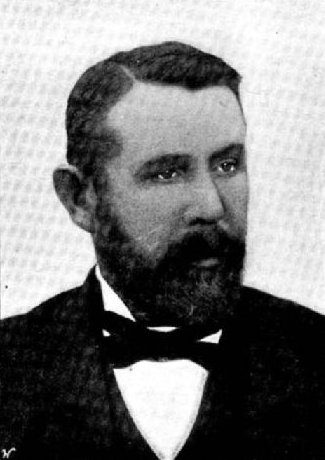
Jeremiah Twomey

Jeremiah Matthew Twomey (15 August 1847 – 1 November 1921) was a Member of the New Zealand Legislative Council. He was widely known in New Zealand as a journalist.

== Early life ==
Twomey was born in 1847 at Inchee Farm, County Kerry, Ireland. He worked at General Post Office in Cork from age 18 until he resigned for emigration to New Zealand in 1874. Before leaving Ireland, Twomey was an occasional contributor to the press and magazines.

== Life in New Zealand ==
Soon after his arrival in the colony, Twomey joined the staff of the Wellington Tribune, owned and edited by W. Hutchison. Subsequently, he was employed on the Wellington Chronicle, The Evening Post, The Wanganui Herald, The Timaru Herald, and The Press in Christchurch. He purchased the Temuka Leader in 1881 and founded the Geraldine Guardian in 1883. He retired as a newspaper proprietor in 1914, but continued with occasional contributions to The Press.

He married Mary Teresa, eldest daughter of Christopher Hughos, of Melbourne, in 1882, and they had four sons and four daughters.

== Political career ==
In the 1884 general election, he contested the Gladstone electorate, but was defeated by the incumbent, James Sutter. He advocated a state bank, cheap money for farmers, protection of local industries, the acquisition of large estates for close settlement, working men's homes, etc. In the 1887 general election, he again contested the same constituency with Arthur Rhodes, but was defeated by 63 votes. His address on the development of the industries of the colony attracted a great deal of attention, more especially in Otago, where it was reprinted and distributed in tens of thousands for electioneering purposes. It was also published in several weekly papers and largely quoted by some of the daily papers. In the 1890 general election, he contested the Timaru electorate; five candidates stood, the incumbent William Hall-Jones got re-elected, and Twomey came third.

Twomey was a firm believer in party government, and had a great objection to more than one candidate of a party standing for a seat. For this reason he has stood aside for others on various occasions. In 1896 a section of the Liberal Party in Christchurch invited him to stand for the city, but owing to the way in which the party was split up, he declined the invitation.

Twomey was appointed to the Legislative Council on 18 June 1898, in recognition of his services to the Liberal Party. He served for one term of seven years until 18 June 1905.

Twomey died on 1 November 1921 at his home in Temuka. He had been in poor health for the last three years.
