= Fred Hall-Jones =

New Zealand lawyer, historian and community leader

Fred Hall-Jones OBE
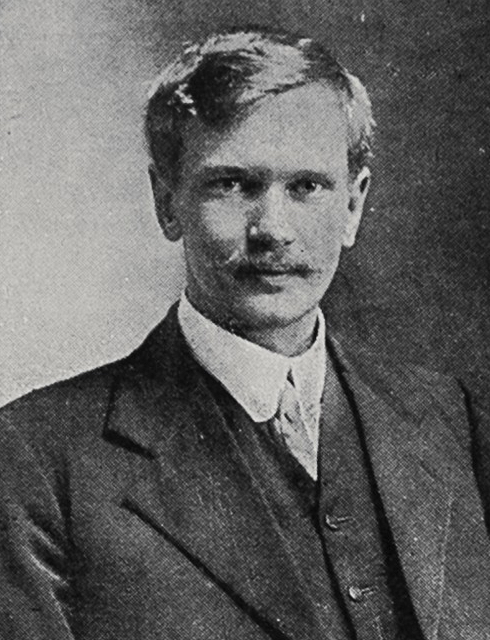
- Hall-Jones, c. 1911
- Born: Frederick George Hall-Jones; 4 July 1891; Scarborough, New Zealand
- Died: 28 January 1982 (aged 90)
- Occupations: Lawyer, historian and community leader
- Parents: William Hall-Jones (father); Rosalind Lucy Purss (mother)
- Relatives: John Hall-Jones (son)

Frederick George Hall-Jones OBE (4 July 1891 – 28 January 1982) was a New Zealand lawyer, historian and community leader.

== Biography ==
Hall-Jones was born in Scarborough just south of Timaru, South Canterbury, New Zealand, on 4 July 1891, the son of William Hall-Jones and Rosalind Lucy Hall-Jones (née Purss).

He took over the legal practice of R. H. Rattray at Invercargill in 1917, it later being known as Hall-Jones & Sons. At the 1938 general election he stood as the National Party candidate for the seat of Invercargill, but lost to Labour's William Denham.

In 1953, Hall-Jones was awarded the Queen Elizabeth II Coronation Medal. He was appointed an Officer of the Order of the British Empire in the 1957 Queen's Birthday Honours, for services in community affairs and as an historian in Southland. His son, John Hall-Jones, was an otolaryngologist (i.e. a doctor who specialised in the ear, nose, and throat or ENT region), author and historian of southern New Zealand.

== Selected works ==
- Hall-Jones, F.G. (1943). King of the Bluff. Invercargill: Southland Historical Committee.
- Hall-Jones, F.G. (1944). Kelly of Inverkelly. Invercargill: Southland Historical Committee.
- Hall-Jones, F.G. (1945). Historical Southland. Invercargill: H. & J. Smith.
- Hall-Jones, F.G. (1946). Invercargill Pioneers. Invercargill: Southland Historical Committee.
