= Prime Minister of New Zealand =

Head of government

- Te Pirimia o Aotearoa
- Coat of arms of New Zealand

- Flag of New Zealand

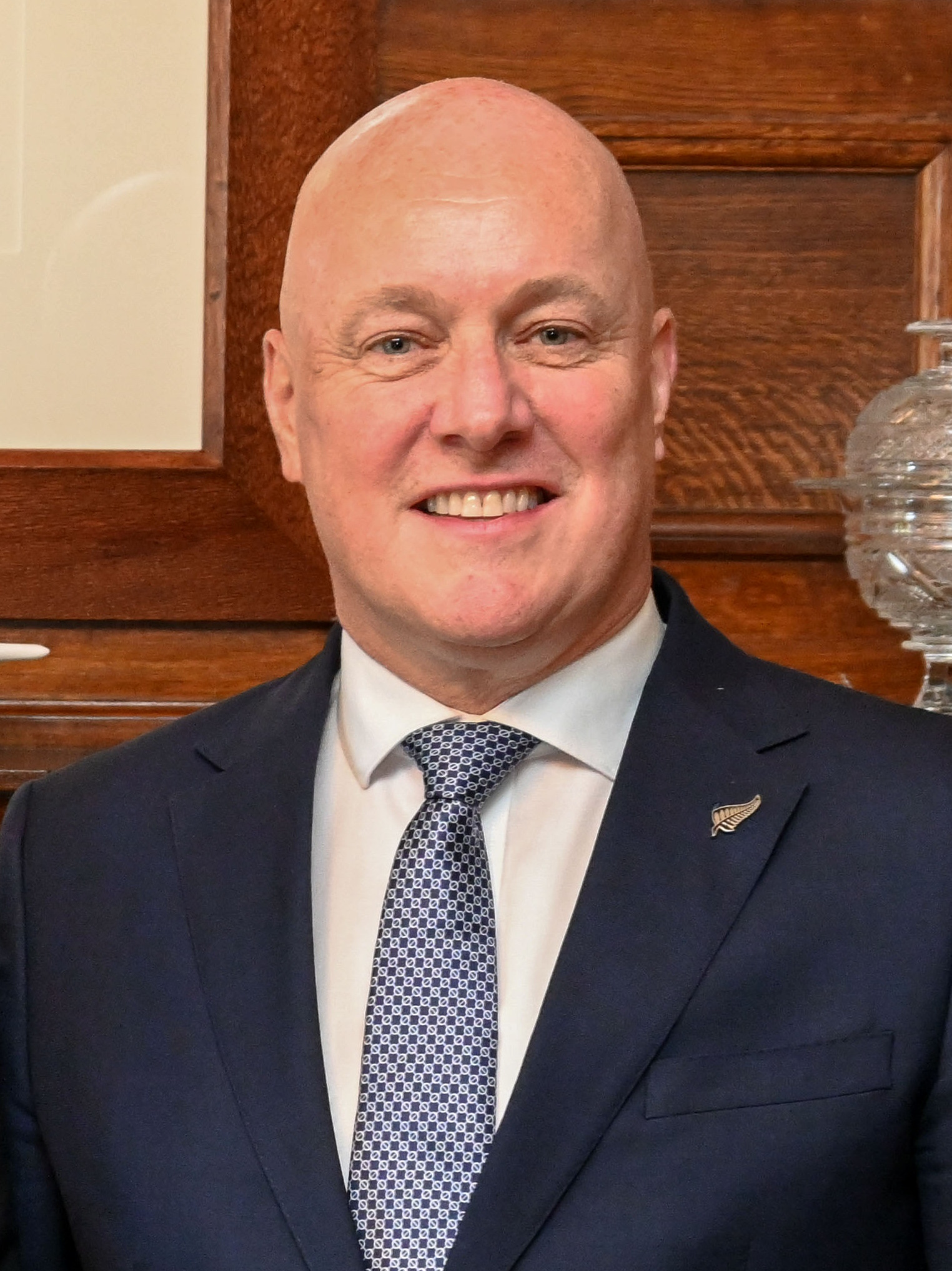
- Incumbent; Christopher Luxon since 27 November 2023
- Department of the Prime Minister and Cabinet
- Style: Prime Minister (informal); The Right Honourable (formal); His Excellency (diplomatic)
- Status: Head of government
- Abbreviation: PM
- Member of: Parliament; Cabinet; Executive Council
- Reports to: House of Representatives
- Residence: Premier House, Wellington
- Seat: The Beehive, Wellington
- Appointer: Governor-General
- Term length: At the Governor-General's pleasure
- Formation: 7 May 1856; 170 years ago
- First holder: Henry Sewell
- Deputy: Deputy Prime Minister of New Zealand
- Salary: NZ$510,300

The prime minister of New Zealand (Māori: Te pirimia o Aotearoa) is the head of government of New Zealand. The incumbent prime minister, Christopher Luxon, leader of the New Zealand National Party, took office on 27 November 2023.

The prime minister (informally abbreviated to PM) ranks as the most senior government minister. They are responsible for chairing meetings of Cabinet; allocating posts to ministers within the government; acting as the spokesperson for the government; and providing advice to the sovereign or the sovereign's representative, the governor-general. They also have ministerial responsibility for the Department of the Prime Minister and Cabinet, which is based in the Beehive in Wellington.

The office exists by a long-established convention, which originated in New Zealand's former colonial power, the then United Kingdom of Great Britain and Ireland. The convention stipulates that when the office becomes vacant, the governor-general must select as prime minister the person most likely to command the support, or confidence, of the House of Representatives. This individual is typically the parliamentary leader of the political party that holds the largest number of seats in that house. (Note: Convention merely requires that the prime minister's government can survive a motion of no-confidence. In practice, the head of government is usually the leader of the party with a plurality of seats in the House of Representatives. However, on rare occasions, the prime minister may lead a coalition government that collectively holds more seats than the single largest party.) The prime minister and Cabinet are collectively accountable for their actions to the governor-general, to the House of Representatives, to their political party, and ultimately to the national electorate.

Originally the head of government was titled "colonial secretary" or "first minister". This was changed in 1869 to "premier". That title remained in use for more than 30 years, until Richard Seddon changed it to "prime minister" in 1900 during his tenure in the office. Following the declaration of New Zealand as a Dominion in 1907, the term prime minister was formally adopted. The Māori title for the office is pirimia, and is derived from the English premier. New Zealand prime ministers are styled as "The Right Honourable", a privilege they retain for life.

Forty-two people (thirty-nine men and three women) have served as prime minister, the first being Henry Sewell, who took office on 7 May 1856 as premier. The longest-serving prime minister was Richard Seddon, who served over 13 years, and the shortest-serving was Sewell, who served two weeks.

== Appointment and tenure ==
The governor-general appoints a prime minister, like other ministerial positions, on behalf of the monarch. By the conventions of responsible government, the governor-general will call to form a government the individual most likely to receive the support, or confidence, of a majority of the elected members of parliament (MPs). In making this appointment, convention requires the governor-general to act on the outcome of the electoral process and subsequent discussions between political parties by which the person who will lead the government as prime minister is identified. In practice, the position typically falls to an MP who is the parliamentary leader of the largest political party among those forming the government. (Note: The aftermath of the 1931 New Zealand general election proved an exception.) The prime minister may lead a coalition government and/or a minority government dependent on support from smaller parties during confidence and supply votes.

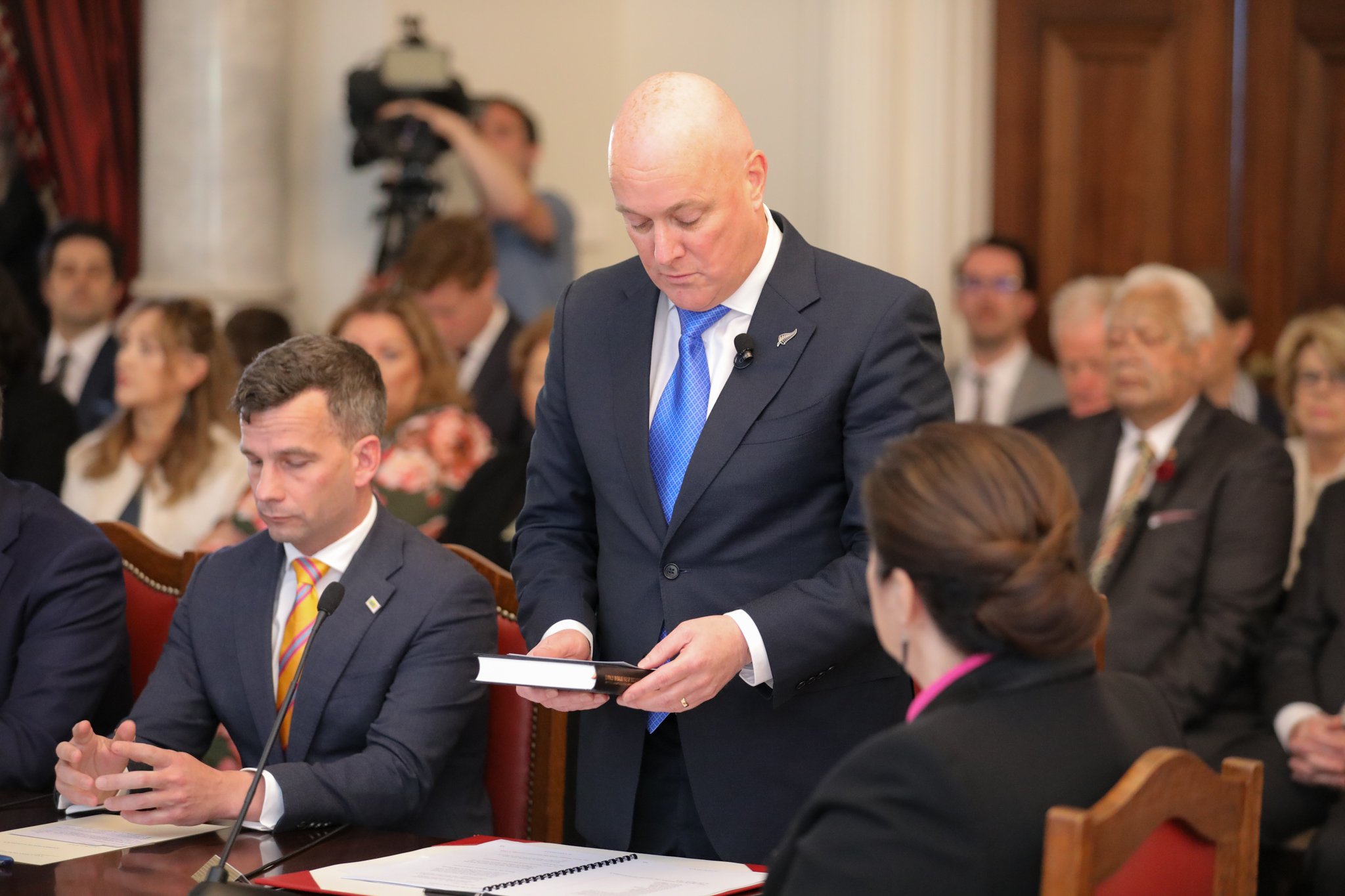
Christopher Luxon reads the oath of allegiance, 27 November 2023

Once appointed and sworn in by the governor-general, the prime minister remains in the post until dismissal, resignation, or death in office. (Note: Five premiers and prime ministers have died in office: John Ballance (1893), Richard Seddon (1906), William Massey (1925), Michael Joseph Savage (1940), and Norman Kirk (1974). All died of natural causes. See: List of members of the New Zealand Parliament who died in office.) They, like all ministers, hold office "during the pleasure of the Governor-General", so theoretically, the governor-general can dismiss a prime minister at any time; however, convention heavily circumscribes the power to do so. The governor-general retains reserve powers to dismiss a prime minister in certain circumstances, such as those pertaining to a no-confidence motion against the government in the House of Representatives.

Where a prime minister, and by extension, the government, can no longer command the confidence of the house, either by losing a confidence vote or as the result of an election, convention dictates that they should tender their resignation to the governor-general. Under the Constitution Act 1986, general elections are required every three years, setting the maximum period a prime minister can serve without their mandate being renewed.

== Responsibilities and powers ==
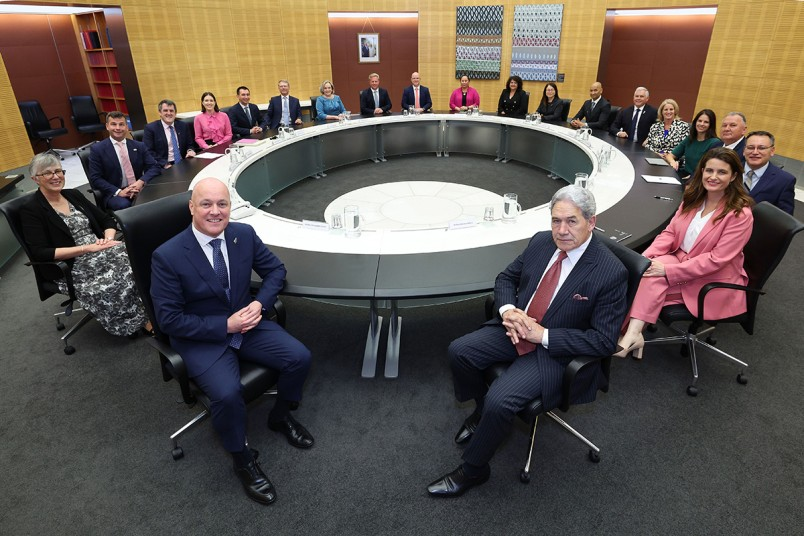
Prime Minister Christopher Luxon (foreground, left of centre) chairs his first meeting of Cabinet, November 2023

The office of prime minister is not defined by codified laws but by unwritten customs known as constitutional conventions which developed in Britain and which New Zealand replicated. These conventions depend for the most part on the underlying principle that the prime minister and fellow ministers must not lose the confidence of the democratically elected component of parliament, the House of Representatives. The prime minister is the leader of the Cabinet (itself a body existing by convention) and takes a coordinating role.

The Cabinet Manual provides an outline of the prime minister's powers and responsibilities.

=== Principal adviser to the sovereign ===
By constitutional convention, the prime minister holds formal power to advise the sovereign. This means that as long as the prime minister has the confidence of parliament, they alone may advise the monarch on:

- appointment or recall of the governor-general (Note: No prime minister in New Zealand has ever exercised the power of recall. Three governors were recalled during the colonial period, but on the advice of British ministers.)
- amendments to the Letters Patent Constituting the Office of Governor-General, which most recently occurred in 2006
- the conferment of New Zealand honours (except for honours in the personal gift of the monarch)

=== Principal adviser to the governor-general ===
As head of government, the prime minister alone has the right to advise the governor-general to:

- appoint, dismiss, or accept the resignation of ministers
- dissolve parliament and issue a writ for an election to be held. (Note: The prime minister is legally obligated to do so within three years of the previous election.) The governor-general may reject the advice to dissolve parliament if the prime minister has recently lost a vote of confidence (that is, the governor-general would be using their reserve powers), but as of 2023 none has done so.

=== Head of government ===
Convention regards the prime minister as "first among equals". A prime minister does hold the most senior post in government, but must also adhere to any decisions taken by Cabinet, as per the convention of collective ministerial responsibility. The actual ability of a prime minister to give direct orders is largely limited; most of the position's power comes about through other means, such as:

- the ability to set the Cabinet agenda, thereby controlling items for discussion (Note: Some political scientists have gone so far as to describe the Cabinet as the prime minister's "focus group".)
- The ability to appoint and dismiss ministers, and to allocate portfolios (Note: The extent to which this power can be exercised varies between parties; the Labour Party, for example, places most of this responsibility in the hands of its parliamentary caucus, leaving the prime minister only with the power to choose which portfolios a minister is given. Furthermore, the MMP electoral system has complicated this, as a prime minister may have to consult with the leaders of other parties in government.)
- the influence a prime minister is likely/assumed to have as leader of the dominant political party, which may afford more direct control over subordinates than is attached to the prime ministerial role
- The power gained simply from being central to most significant decision-making, and from being able (as of right) to comment on and criticise any decisions taken by other ministers

Since the 1996 implementation of the MMP electoral system, the role of the prime minister in negotiating and maintaining relationships with support parties has increased, placing some constraints on prime ministerial abilities.

=== Other roles and functions ===
External videos
- 'New Zealand's darkest day'. Prime Minister John Key addresses the country live on television following the earthquake that devastated Christchurch on 22 February 2011. Providing reassurance and leadership at times of national crisis is a traditional responsibility of the prime minister.

Prime ministers also take on additional portfolios (to prioritise policy areas). Historically, 19th-century premiers looked after the colonial-secretary and finance portfolios. As New Zealand developed, the role of minister of finance became too big; Prime Minister Sir Robert Muldoon came under criticism for taking on the finance portfolio during his time in office (1975–1984), as it resulted in a large concentration of power in the hands of one individual.

Before 1987 it was common for prime ministers to take the role of minister of foreign affairs, so they could represent New Zealand on the international stage. More recent prime ministers have taken portfolios relevant to their interests, or to promote specific areas they saw as important. For example, David Lange took the education portfolio in his second term; Helen Clark took the role of minister for arts, culture and heritage; John Key served as minister of tourism; and Jacinda Ardern became minister for child-poverty reduction.

Although no longer likely to be the minister of foreign affairs, the prime minister remains responsible for welcoming foreign heads of government, visiting leaders overseas, and attending Commonwealth Heads of Government Meetings.

Conventionally, the prime minister is the responsible minister for the Department of the Prime Minister and Cabinet (DPMC; founded in 1990), which has the task of supporting the policy agenda of Cabinet through policy advice and the coordination of the implementation of key government programmes.

Before 2014, the prime minister was also responsible for the New Zealand Security and Intelligence Service (NZSIS) and for the Government Communications Security Bureau (GCSB). In 2014, Prime Minister John Key gave himself the new portfolio of National Security and Intelligence and delegated responsibility for SIS and GCSB to other ministers. He also expanded the role of DPMC in security and intelligence. This model has been followed by subsequent prime ministers.

== Privileges of office ==
=== Salary and perquisites ===
Under the Remuneration Authority Act 1977, and the Members of Parliament (Remuneration and Services) Act 2013, a prime minister's salary is determined annually by the Remuneration Authority, an independent body established by parliament to set salaries for members of parliament and other government officials. MPs' salaries were temporarily reduced during the COVID-19 pandemic in New Zealand. As of July 2026, the prime minister's salary is set at NZ$520,500. In addition, like all other ministers and MPs, the prime minister receives annual allowances for travel and lodging, as do the prime minister's spouse and children.

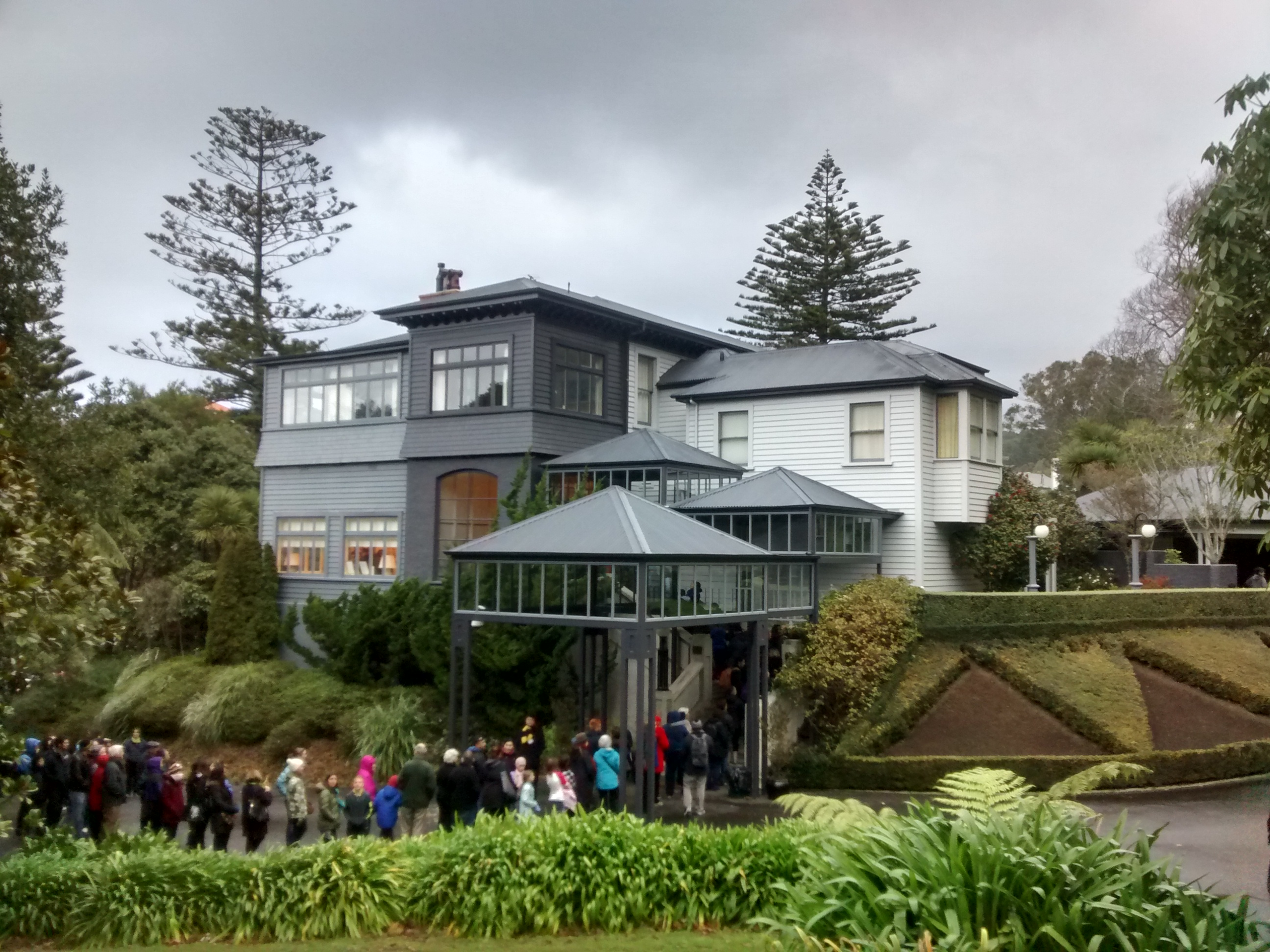
Premier House in Wellington is the prime minister's residence.

The incumbent prime minister's official residence is Premier House, Tinakori Road, Wellington. There the prime minister hosts receptions and events for New Zealand and overseas guests. Unlike the residences of certain other heads of government (e.g. the White House and 10 Downing Street), Premier House does not serve as the government headquarters; the location of the prime minister's office is the Beehive, in the parliament precinct a short distance away. The prime minister's governmental work is supported by the non-partisan Department of the Prime Minister and Cabinet. The separate Private Office of the Prime Minister provides advice and support on political party matters.

The style of "The Right Honourable" (abbreviated to "The Rt Hon") is always granted to the prime minister upon taking office. Former prime ministers retain this style for the remainder of their lives. The written form of address for the head of government should use their full parliamentary title as applicable: The Right Honourable [name], [post-nominal letters], Prime Minister of New Zealand. It is also traditional for the monarch to bestow a knighthood or damehood on prime ministers after they leave office, and two prime ministers were knighted while still in office (namely Sir Keith Holyoake in 1970, and Sir Robert Muldoon in 1983).

=== Security and transport ===
The Dignitary Protection Service (DPS) is a special branch of the New Zealand Police that is charged with protecting the prime minister and their family, as well as members of parliament, members of the judiciary, and visiting foreign dignitaries when required.

The DPS provides the prime minister with transport; they are driven in the BMW 7 Series 730LD and 750LI, the latter of which is armoured. Although usually flown domestically on regularly scheduled Air New Zealand flights, the prime minister also makes use of Royal New Zealand Air Force aircraft, usually Boeing 757. The 757 aircraft, which are used for international travel, has been upgraded with work stations, internal air stairs, and military communications capabilities. The 757 fleet is set to be replaced by 2028.

=== After office ===
Former officeholders are entitled to annuity and travel payments for the rest of their lives. Former prime ministers who held the office for no less than two years are entitled to a yearly rate of $10,900 for each complete year the person held office, with a maximum of $54,500 payable annually. Former prime ministers, when travelling within New Zealand, are eligible to be paid if the travel is for fulfilling commitments related to his or her role as a former prime minister.

Should a serving or former prime minister die, they are accorded a state funeral (subject to the approval of the family). Two prime ministers who died in office were buried in mausoleums: William Massey (died 1925) in the Massey Memorial in Wellington, and Michael Joseph Savage (died 1940) in the Savage Memorial at Bastion Point in Auckland.

== History ==
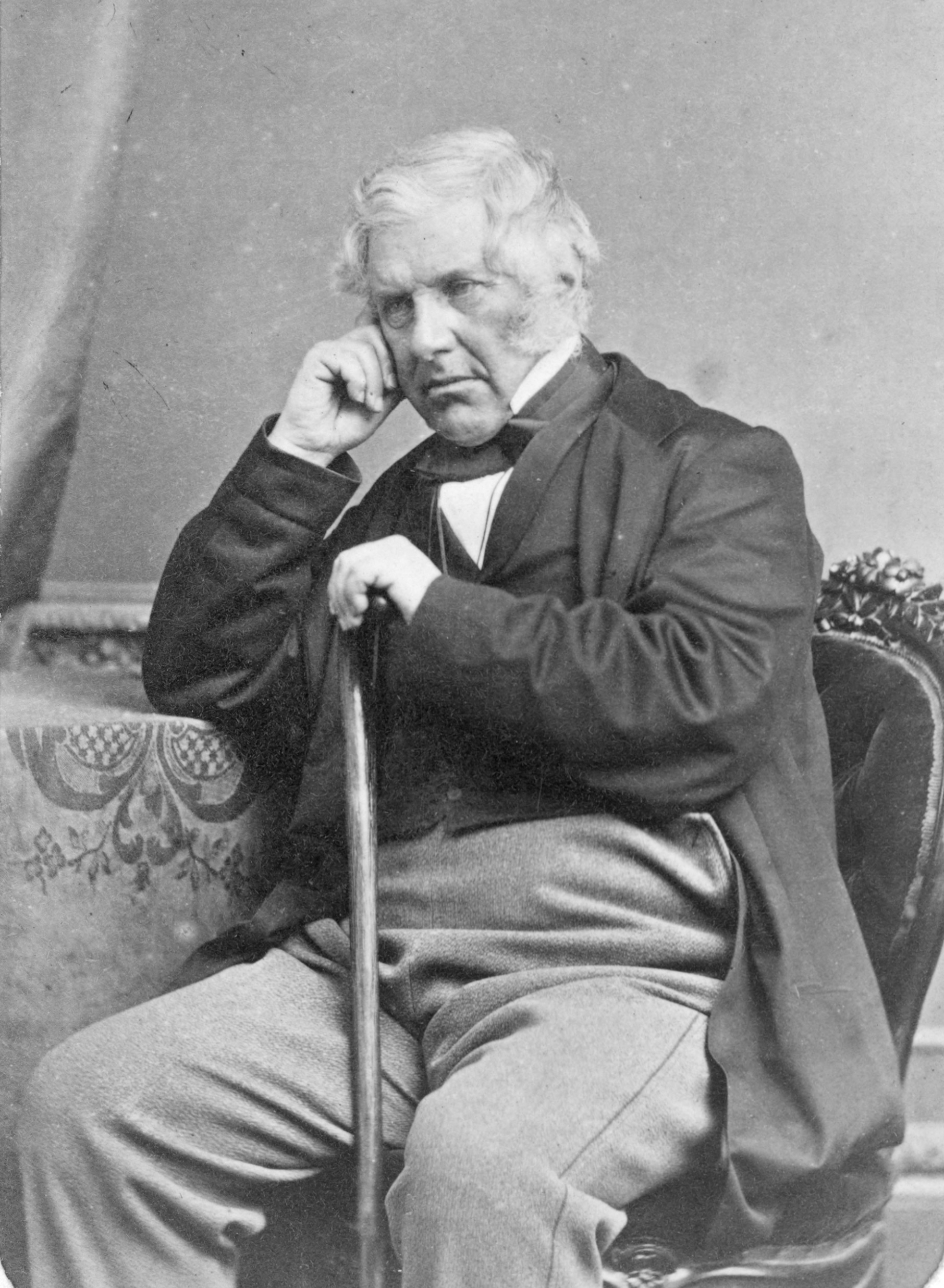
Henry Sewell, regarded as New Zealand's first premier

Assuming that Henry Sewell is counted as the first prime minister, 42 individuals have held the office since it was established. Some of these people have held it on several separate occasions, with the record for maximum number of times being shared between William Fox and Harry Atkinson (both of whom served four times). The longest that anyone has served in the office is 13 years, a record set by Richard Seddon. The first holder of the office, Henry Sewell, led the country for the shortest total time; his only term lasted just 13 days. The shortest term belonged to Harry Atkinson, whose third term lasted only seven days, but Atkinson served longer in total than did Sewell. The youngest was Edward Stafford, who was appointed premier in 1856, at 37 years, 40 days old. The oldest was Walter Nash, who was 78 years old when he left office in 1960 (and 75 upon taking office in 1957).

It is regarded that all New Zealand prime ministers thus far have been Pākehā (New Zealand European), and mostly of British and Irish descent. There was persistent speculation during his lifetime that Norman Kirk (Prime Minister from 1972 to 1974) was Māori and had Kāi Tahu ancestry; he never publicly identified himself as such, and there is no substantial evidence for the claim.

New Zealand is one of the few countries in the world to have had three female heads of government and one of only three countries to have had a female head of government directly succeed another. The first female prime minister was Jenny Shipley of the National Party, who replaced Jim Bolger in late 1997; Shipley was succeeded by Helen Clark in 1999. Jacinda Ardern, the second female leader of the Labour Party after Clark, became prime minister in 2017.

=== Early leaders ===
On becoming the Colony of New Zealand in 1841, the country was directly governed by a governor, appointed by the Colonial Office in Britain. Self-government was established in 1853, following the New Zealand Constitution Act 1852, and the First Parliament met on 24 May 1854.

The origins of the office of prime minister are disputed. Use of the words prime minister as a descriptive term dates back to the First Parliament, where they are applied to James FitzGerald and Thomas Forsaith. FitzGerald and Forsaith had no official titles, however, and New Zealand had not yet obtained self-government. As such, they are not usually considered prime ministers in any substantive sense.

The first person to be formally appointed to a position of executive leadership was Henry Sewell, who formed a brief ministry in April 1856, at the beginning of the Second Parliament. Despite his formal leadership role, however, his only actual title was "colonial secretary", a position comparable to a minister of internal affairs. His successor, William Fox, was also given a formal leadership role but was not a colonial secretary. In 1864 when Frederick Weld became the sixth person appointed to formal leadership, a substantive leadership title, "premier", appeared. Weld's successor, Edward Stafford, briefly changed the title to "first minister", but it was soon restored to premier during the second tenure of Fox in 1869. From that point, the title "premier" was used almost exclusively for the remainder of the 19th century. Nevertheless, in the Schedule of the Civil List of 1873, provision was made for the salary of the head of government "being the Prime Minister".

Initially, premiers acted as mere advisers to the governor—with the governor at times a very active partner. This began to change during the first tenure of Edward Stafford. Stafford met with his ministers and made decisions outside of the Executive Council, which was chaired by the governor, thus establishing the modern convention of cabinet government. Stafford also clashed with the governor over control of native affairs, which was eventually to fall within the premier's powers.

=== Party leadership ===
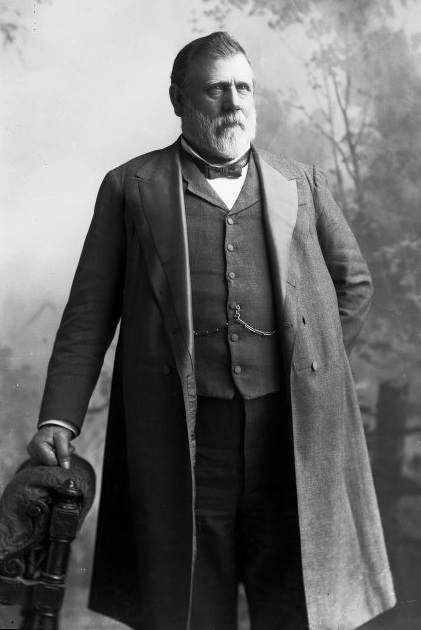
Richard Seddon styled himself "Prime Minister" at the turn of the 20th century

Premiers were initially supported by unorganised factions based on personal interests, and their governments were short-lived. The political position of the premier was enhanced by the development of modern political parties. Premier John Ballance organised the first formal party in New Zealand, the Liberal Party, forming the Liberal Government in 1891. There was little real parliamentary opposition until 1909, when William Massey organised his conservative faction to form the Reform Party. Thereafter political power centred on parties and their leaders. (Subsequent governments were led by prime ministers from the Reform, United, Labour and National parties.) Although not every government would have a large majority, the party system and tight control of party members by whips helped heads of government to direct the passage of legislation in the House of Representatives. In 1893, the premier gained the ability to restrict the term of appointments to the Legislative Council.

After 1900, Richard Seddon, the incumbent head of government, used the title of "prime minister". The change of title was reflected in the New Zealand Official Yearbook of that year. Seddon's immediate successor, William Hall-Jones, was the first to be sworn in as "prime minister", in 1906.

The expanding power of the prime minister was kept in check by the need to build consensus with other leading members of the Cabinet and of the governing party, including those who represented various ideological wings of the party. Other institutions, including Parliament itself and the wider state bureaucracy, also acted as limits on prime ministerial power; in 1912 Thomas Mackenzie was the last prime minister to lose power through an unsuccessful confidence motion in the House of Representatives.

=== Towards modern leadership ===
One change brought about by the First World War was direct participation in governing the British Empire. Previously, New Zealand prime ministers had attended occasional colonial and imperial conferences, but they otherwise communicated with London through the governor (a position then appointed by the British government). In 1917, British prime minister David Lloyd George offered the New Zealand prime minister a seat in the Imperial War Cabinet, the British Empire's wartime coordinating body. In 1919, Prime Minister William Massey signed the Treaty of Versailles on behalf of New Zealand, signalling the independence of New Zealand within the empire, although Massey downplayed the event as an ardent imperialist.

Constitutional conventions adopted in 1930, following the Imperial Conference held that year, increased the domestic and international prestige of the prime minister. The Statute of Westminster 1931 confirmed that Dominions had exclusive power to make their laws. New Zealand initially resisted greater autonomy and did not adopt the statute until 1947. Increasingly New Zealand began to act independently in foreign affairs. During the 1940s the prime minister's profile rose as New Zealand signed several international treaties. In 1967, Keith Holyoake became the first New Zealand prime minister to select candidates for the position of governor-general without any involvement of the British government. Holyoake advised the monarch, Queen Elizabeth II, to appoint Sir Arthur Porritt, the first New Zealand-born governor-general.

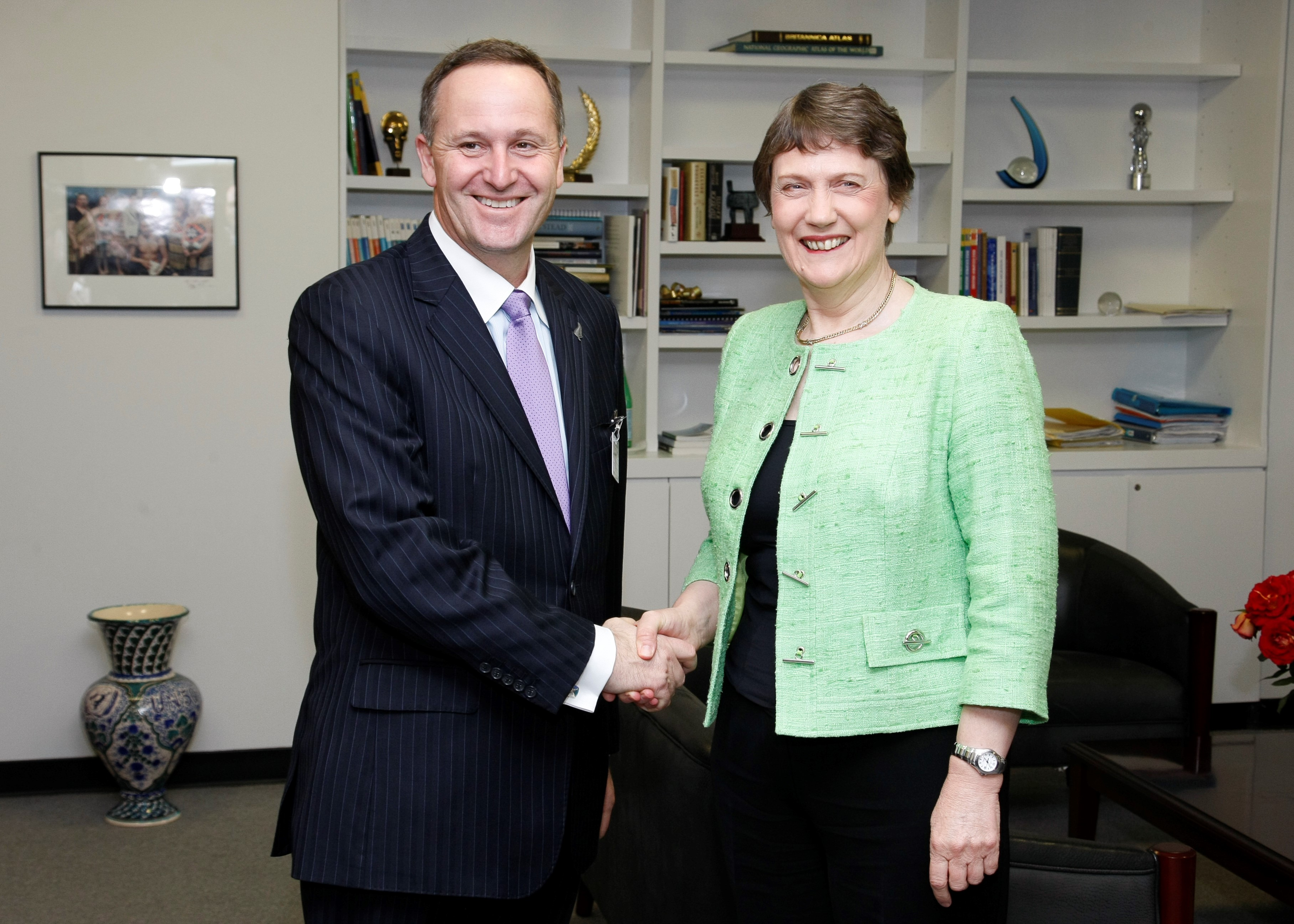
The 37th and 38th prime ministers of New Zealand, pictured in 2009: John Key with his predecessor, Helen Clark.

After the mixed-member proportional (MMP) system was introduced in 1996, prime ministers have had to manage minority governments, although the Ward government formed in 1928 and the Forbes government formed in 1930 are two earlier minority government examples. The Forbes-led United and Reform coalition from 1931 to 1935 was the country's first coalition government outside of wartime; and George Forbes is the only New Zealand parliamentary leader of a junior coalition party to have served as prime minister. The skill of MMP management was exemplified by Helen Clark's nine years as prime minister (1999–2008), when her Labour government remained in power thanks to a range of confidence-and-supply agreements with five smaller parties.

Until the premiership of Helen Clark, it was customary for senior members of the legislature, executive and judiciary—including the prime minister—to be appointed to the Privy Council, granting them the style "Right Honourable". This practice was discontinued at the same time as the abolition of knighthoods and damehoods in 2000 from the New Zealand royal honours system. National's John Key became prime minister in 2008 and moved to restore titular honours, but did not resume appointments to the Privy Council, meaning Key was styled "The Honourable". On 3 August 2010, the Queen granted the style "Right Honourable" to the offices of prime minister, governor-general, speaker of the House of Representatives and chief justice, to be held for life by those appointed to these roles.

On 21 June 2018, Labour's Jacinda Ardern became the first prime minister of New Zealand (and second elected head of government in the world) to give birth while in office. Ardern was also the first prime minister to lead a single-party majority government since the introduction of MMP, doing so from 2020 to 2023.

== Deputy prime minister ==
An office titled "deputy prime minister" has existed since 1949. (Note: The formal title dates to 1949, although the role of deputy has existed on an informal basis for as long as the office of prime minister/premier has existed.) The deputy typically holds important ministerial portfolios and, by convention, becomes acting prime minister in the absence or incapacity of the prime minister. (Note: There is, however, no legislated order of succession.) The deputy is commonly a member of the same party as the prime minister, but not necessarily so; in coalition governments, the parliamentary leader of a junior party may be offered the post. David Seymour, leader of ACT New Zealand, has been deputy prime minister since 31 May 2025.

== Lists relating to the prime ministers of New Zealand ==
Lists of the 42 people who have so far held the premiership:

- List of prime ministers of New Zealand
- List of prime ministers of New Zealand by place of birth
- List of prime ministers of New Zealand by education

== See also ==
- Spouse of the prime minister of New Zealand
- List of New Zealand electorates represented by sitting prime ministers
- Deputy Prime Minister of New Zealand
- New Zealand order of precedence
- List of New Zealand governments
- List of current heads of state and government
- Powers of the prime minister of the United Kingdom – comparable to the New Zealand prime minister
