= Edward Stafford (politician) =

Premier of New Zealand (1819–1901)

The Right Honourable Sir Edward Stafford GCMG
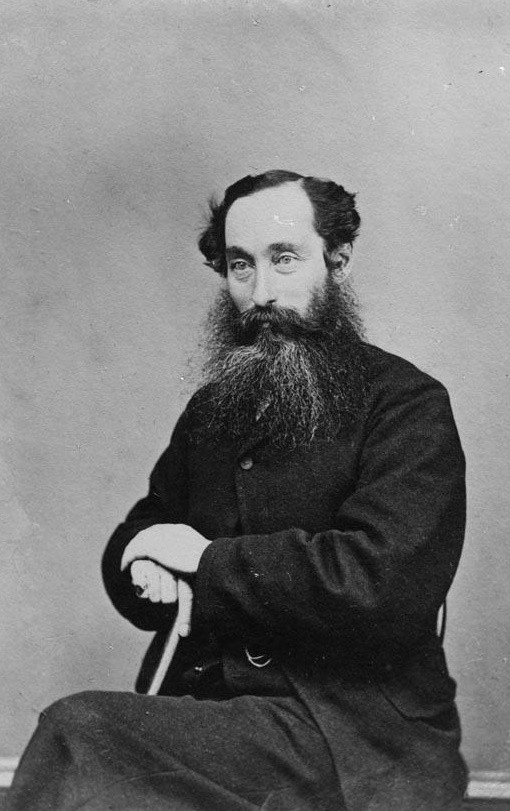

3rd Premier of New Zealand
- In office 2 June 1856 – 12 July 1861
- Monarch: Victoria
- Governor: Thomas Gore Browne
- Preceded by: William Fox
- Succeeded by: William Fox
- In office 16 October 1865 – 28 June 1869
- Governor: George Grey
- Preceded by: Frederick Weld
- Succeeded by: William Fox
- In office 10 September 1872 – 11 October 1872
- Governor: George Bowen
- Preceded by: William Fox
- Succeeded by: George Waterhouse

6th Colonial Secretary
- In office 4 November 1856 – 12 July 1861
- Preceded by: William Richmond
- Succeeded by: Isaac Featherston

1st Superintendent of Nelson Province
- In office 1 August 1853 – September 1856
- Preceded by: Position established
- Succeeded by: John Perry Robinson

Personal details
- Born: Edward William Stafford; 23 April 1819 Edinburgh, Scotland
- Died: February 1901 (aged 81) London, England
- Party: None
- Spouses: Emily Wakefield (m. 1846; died 1857) Mary Bartley (m. 1859; died 1899)
- Children: 6
- Education: Trinity College Dublin
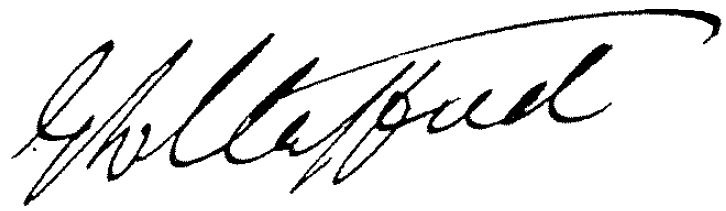
- Signature

Sir Edward William Stafford GCMG (23 April 1819 – 14 or 15 February 1901) served as the third premier of New Zealand on three occasions in the mid 19th century. His total time in office is the longest of any leader without a political party. He is described as pragmatic, logical, and clear-sighted.

== Early life and career ==
Edward William Stafford was born on 23 April 1819 in Edinburgh, Scotland, the son of Berkeley Buckingham Stafford (High Sheriff of Louth in 1828) and Anne, the daughter of Lieutenant-Colonel Patrick Tytler. His family was prosperous, enabling him to receive a good education, first at the Royal School Dungannon in Ireland where he excelled as a scholar, and then at Trinity College Dublin. In 1841–1842, he undertook travel in Australia, but chose to join relatives in Nelson, New Zealand in 1843, where he soon became active in politics, criticising Governor Robert FitzRoy's "weak" response to the Wairau Affray. In 1850, he joined increasing calls for New Zealand's self-government, including universal suffrage.

In 1853, Stafford became the first Superintendent of Nelson Province. Among his achievements was the establishment of an education system (compulsory, free, and secular) which was later used as the basis of the national system. His administration of Nelson Province was well regarded by many.

When the New Zealand Parliament was opened, however, Stafford did not seek election, claiming that it was inappropriate to enter national politics while still holding provincial office. Despite requests from politicians such as Henry Sewell, Stafford declined to stand for parliament until the election of 1855, when he was elected MP for Nelson.

== Premier of New Zealand ==
New Zealand Parliament
Years	Term	Electorate	Party
1855–1860	2nd	Town of Nelson	Independent
1860–1866	3rd	City of Nelson	Independent
1866–1868	4th	City of Nelson	Independent
1868–1870	4th	Timaru	Independent
1871–1875	5th	Timaru	Independent
1875–1878	6th	Timaru	Independent

=== First term ===
When the position of Premier was created in 1856, Stafford refused to compete for the office. Instead, it was taken by Sewell. Sewell's term, however, lasted only thirteen days, after which he was replaced by William Fox. Stafford refused offers of a ministerial position from both leaders. When Fox's government fell, having lasted exactly the same number of days as Sewell's, Stafford was deemed the only suitable candidate remaining, and agreed to become Premier. Stafford to date remains the youngest New Zealand Prime Minister on gaining office at 37 years, 5 weeks of age.

Among Stafford's first acts as Premier were measures to define the relationship between central and provincial government. Also notable was the unofficial establishment of Cabinet, which met independently of the official Executive Council. This meant that much government business was conducted without the presence of the Governor, straining relations between Governor Thomas Gore Browne and parliament.

Stafford also clashed with the Governor on the subject of the distribution of powers, particularly responsibility for dealings with Māori. Thomas Gore Browne, disdainful of the chaotic nature of the Sewell and Fox premierships, did not believe that parliament should have control over such an important matter, while Stafford pursued his old goal of democratic self-government. Stafford, on behalf of the new government, refused all responsibility for financing actions undertaken by the governor without parliament's approval.

In 1858 and 1859, Stafford was out of New Zealand, attempting to negotiate on the country's behalf for various services. His trip proved problematic, however – during his absence, his colleagues and Governor Browne agreed to force Māori into selling land at Waitara, despite Stafford's strong objections. Forcing Māori to sell their land triggered the First Taranaki War. Stafford condemned the decision on grounds of both economics and morality and considered resignation. Eventually, he chose to continue his premiership, but Stafford's views on relations with the Māori were eventually to cause his departure regardless – attacks by William Fox on Stafford's "weakness", and Stafford's lack of support for the Invasion of the Waikato, caused him to lose parliament's confidence by a single vote in July 1861. William Fox became Premier once again.

When Fox's government fell one year later, Stafford had the opportunity to become Premier again, but declined. His stated reason for doing so was his hostility to Governor George Grey, whom Stafford believed he would be unable to override on policy matters – Stafford did not wish to become Premier if the Governor would simply block his policies. Instead, Alfred Domett took the premiership. Domett's premiership has been described as "like a Stafford ministry without Stafford", although the invasion of the Waikato began in July 1863. Domett was replaced by Frederick Whitaker after little more than a year, but Whitaker himself only lasted a similar time before being replaced by Frederick Weld. Weld, like Domett, followed policies similar to Stafford, although did not enjoy good personal relations with him.

=== Second term ===
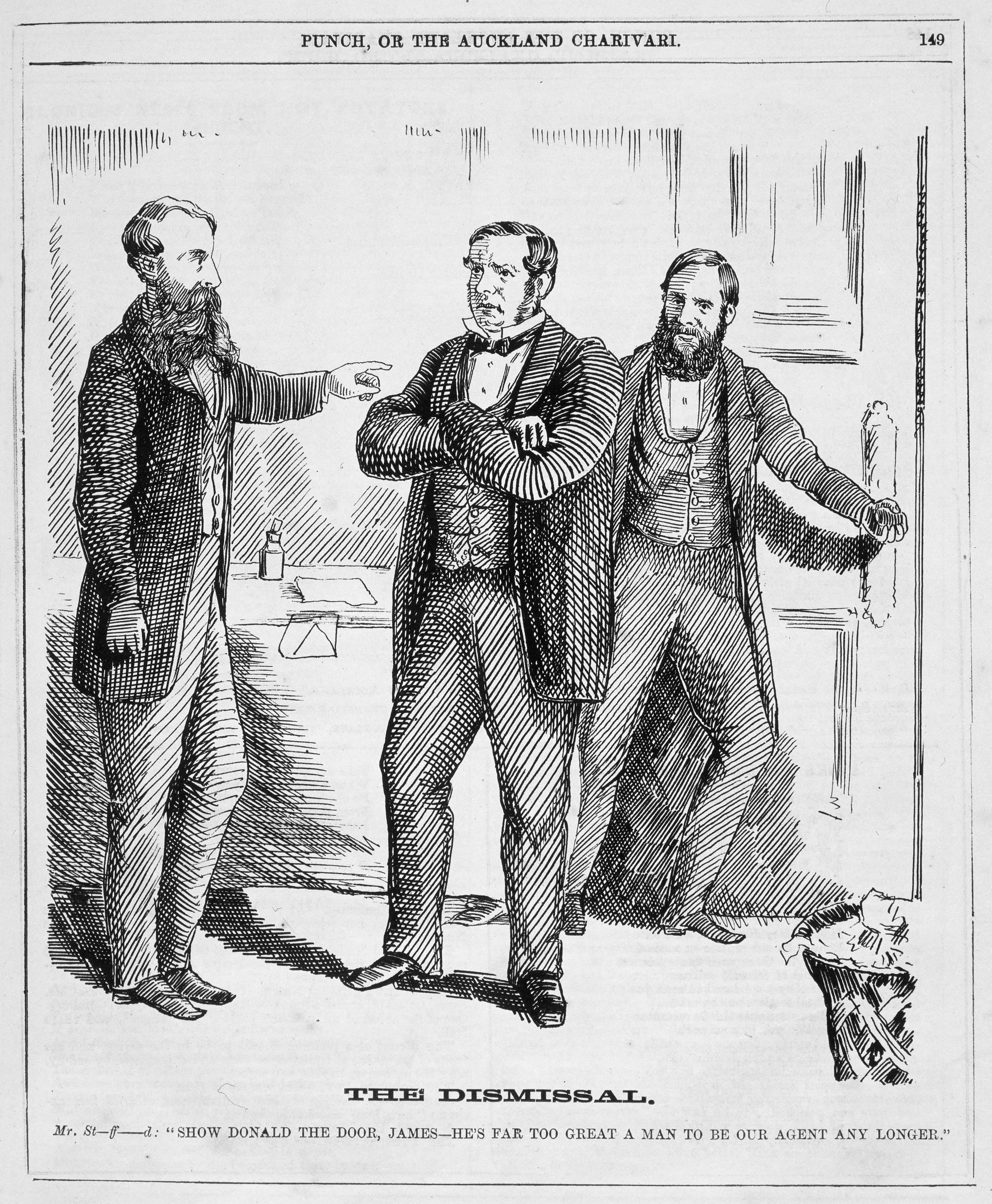
Stafford asks a minister to show Donald McLean to leave the room: "Show Donald the door, James—he's far too great a man to be our agent any longer."

On 16 October 1865, when Weld retired due to ill health and stress, Stafford took up the premiership once again. As Premier, he continued Weld's legislative program, but reduced what he saw as Weld's excessive expenditure (this having been one of the issues that caused the dislike between the two men). His administration was marked by efficiency and frugality.

Stafford's relations with the Governor were gradually deteriorating. In particular, there was considerable debate over responsibility for financing military activity against Māori in the New Zealand Wars. Stafford took the view that the conflict was essentially an "imperial" one, started and promoted by the British authorities. He objected to the British view that the colonial parliament should have primary responsibility for crushing the "rebel" tribes, and ignored the Governor's complaints about drastically reduced military expenditure. When the British government finally surrendered responsibility for dealing with the Māori it demanded Stafford give substantial compensation for the costs of its military ventures. Stafford refused, and presented his own counter-claim for settler losses. In 1868, an agreement was reached where both sides would drop their claims.

Stafford's government maintained generally good relations with Māori for some time. This exemplified by the establishment of Māori seats in parliament in 1867, and by Stafford's request for the governor to pardon "rebel" Māori chiefs. The sudden military successes of Te Kooti and Titokowaru caused many to claim that Stafford's attempts at reconciliation had been misjudged. Stafford sought to call an election and gain a fresh mandate, but his move was blocked by Governor George Bowen, who had a strong dislike of Stafford. Stafford's government was defeated in 1869. His replacement was, once again, William Fox.

=== Third term ===
Fox's government became increasingly dominated by its financial leader, Julius Vogel, and Stafford began to focus on him rather than on Fox. Stafford did not greatly disapprove of Vogel's extensive public works plans, but complained that Vogel was reckless in their implementation. Fox's diminishing control over his administration eventually allowed Stafford to reclaim the premiership in 1872. Stafford's majority was small, however, and he was soon defeated in a vote of no confidence. With Bowen again refusing permission for an election, Stafford had no option but to resign. He was replaced by George Waterhouse.

Stafford briefly attempted to unify the opposition, but found too many disparate personalities. Increasingly, Stafford began to work with Julius Vogel – despite Stafford's criticism of Vogel's financial policies, and Vogel's role in ending Stafford's last premiership, the two shared many similar views. When Vogel became Premier, Stafford was offered a ministerial position, but declined on the grounds that he needed to attend to personal affairs.

== Later life ==
Stafford resigned from Nelson on 19 November 1868, and was elected MP for Timaru on 20 November 1868. He represented that electorate until he resigned on 25 February 1878. When Vogel was seeking to retire, Stafford again had a chance to return to government, but again declined. Stafford retired in 1878, strongly disliking the new premiership of former governor George Grey.

Stafford spent considerable time in England, devoting himself to business pursuits. He was granted a Knight Commander of the Order of St Michael and St George on his arrival, and was also offered governorships of Madras (now known as Chennai) and Queensland, which he declined. Upgraded to a Knight Grand Cross of the Order of St Michael and St George in the 1887 Golden Jubilee Honours, Stafford died in London; sources differ whether this happened on 14 or 15 February 1901. He was survived by three daughters and three sons, the product of his marriage to Mary Bartley in 1859. Mary had died in 1899. A prior marriage to Emily Charlotte, daughter of William Wakefield, had been childless, with Emily having died in 1857 at the age of 29. Stafford's lifespan paralleled that of Queen Victoria – he was born 31 days before the queen in 1819, and died 24 days after her in 1901.

Political offices
New office	Superintendent of Nelson Province; 1853–1856	Succeeded by John Perry Robinson
Preceded by William Fox	Premier of New Zealand; 1856–1861; 1865–1869; 1872	Succeeded by William Fox
Preceded by Frederick Weld	Premier of New Zealand; 1856–1861; 1865–1869; 1872	Succeeded by William Fox
Preceded by William Fox	Premier of New Zealand; 1856–1861; 1865–1869; 1872	Succeeded by George Waterhouse
Preceded by William Richmond	Colonial Secretary of New Zealand; 1856–1861	Succeeded by Isaac Featherston
Preceded by John Richardson	Postmaster-General; 1865–1866; 1869	Succeeded by James Paterson
Preceded by John Hall	Postmaster-General; 1865–1866; 1869	Succeeded by Julius Vogel
New Zealand Parliament
Preceded by James Mackay; Samuel Stephens	Member of Parliament for Nelson; 1855–1868; Served alongside: Alfred Domett, Oswald Curtis	Succeeded by Nathaniel Edwards
Preceded by Alfred Cox	Member of Parliament for Timaru; 1868–1878	Succeeded by Richard Turnbull
