= William Hall-Jones =

Prime minister of New Zealand in 1906

The Honourable Sir William Hall-Jones KCMG
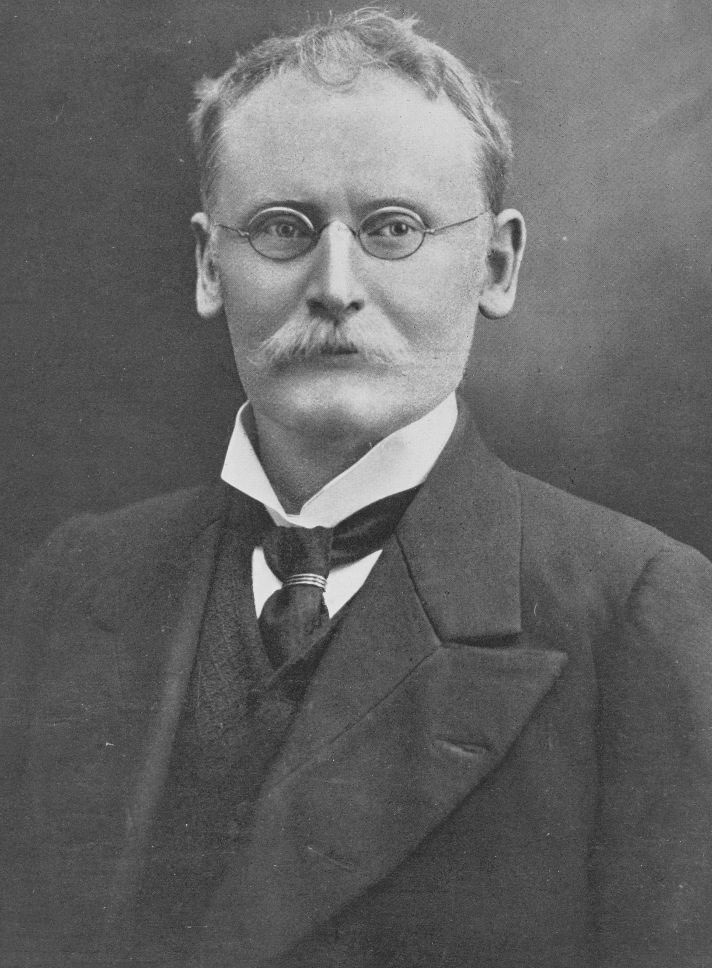
- Hall-Jones in 1906

16th Prime Minister of New Zealand
- In office 10 June 1906 – 6 August 1906
- Monarch: Edward VII
- Governor: William Plunket
- Preceded by: Richard Seddon
- Succeeded by: Joseph Ward

12th Minister of Public Works
- In office 2 March 1896 – 30 November 1908
- Prime Minister: Richard Seddon; Himself; Joseph Ward
- Preceded by: Richard Seddon
- Succeeded by: Roderick McKenzie

Member of the New Zealand Parliament for Timaru
- In office 18 August 1890 – 29 October 1908
- Preceded by: Richard Turnbull
- Succeeded by: James Craigie

Personal details
- Born: 16 January 1851 Folkestone, Kent, England
- Died: 19 June 1936 (aged 85) Wellington, New Zealand
- Party: Liberal
- Spouse(s): Fanny Smith (m. 1873; died 1876) Rosalind Lucy Purss (m. 1877)
- Children: Fred Hall-Jones
- Relatives: John Hall-Jones (grandson)
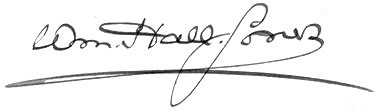
- Signature

Sir William Hall-Jones KCMG (16 January 1851 – 19 June 1936) was the 16th prime minister of New Zealand from June 1906 until August 1906.

Hall-Jones entered parliament in 1890, later becoming a member of the Liberal Party. He was interim prime minister from the death of Richard Seddon to the return from overseas of Joseph Ward. Hall-Jones was a mild mannered man with a fully earned reputation as an outstanding administrator. Seddon famously said of him, "He is the best administrator I have in my Cabinet."

From 1908 to 1912, Hall-Jones was New Zealand's High Commissioner to the United Kingdom.

== Early years ==
Hall-Jones was born in Folkestone, Kent, England, and landed at Dunedin in 1873. He became a carpenter and later a builder in Timaru. He developed an interest in local politics serving on the Timaru Borough Council from 1884 to 1886, and again from 1890 to 1892.

== Member of Parliament ==
New Zealand Parliament
Years	Term	Electorate	Party
1890	10th	Timaru	Independent Liberal
1890–1893	11th	Timaru	Independent Liberal
1893–1896	12th	Timaru	Independent Liberal
1896–1899	13th	Timaru	Liberal
1899–1902	14th	Timaru	Liberal
1902–1905	15th	Timaru	Liberal
1905–1908	16th	Timaru	Liberal

The death of Richard Turnbull triggered a by-election in the Timaru electorate, which was won by Hall-Jones on 18 August 1890. Hall-Jones had initially refused nomination from locals, citing several upcoming business contracts. However, after persistent calls, Hall-Jones reluctantly accepted despite having no parliamentary ambitions. He represented Timaru in the House of Representatives until his resignation in October 1908.

Hall-Jones proved an independent thinker. He was initially an Independent Liberal holding moderate, progressive views that tended to align him with John Ballance, Sir George Grey and John McKenzie. He joined the Liberal caucus and in 1891 became the party whip alongside Westby Perceval.

=== Cabinet minister ===
Hall-Jones became a cabinet minister in March 1896 and was given the Public Works portfolio by the prime minister, Richard Seddon following William Pember Reeves resignation to become Agent General for New Zealand in the United Kingdom. His main task in this role was improving the main trunk rail line between Auckland and Wellington. Rejecting a proposal for another incline on the Rimutaka ranges he insisted on using a better route, resulting in the Raurimu Spiral. He was also responsible for the eventual construction of the Otira tunnel, going through Arthur's Pass.

Several weeks after entering cabinet, Hall-Jones was also appointed minister of marine, a post which he was to hold for over a decade. Hall-Jones was also responsible for passing a bill granting protection to the famous navigation dolphin Pelorus Jack by Order in Council under the Sea Fisheries Act on 26 September 1904.

=== Prime minister ===
Hall-Jones was acting prime minister during the absence from the country of Seddon in 1906 and formed an administration immediately after Seddon's funeral. During his brief period as prime minister, he was colonial treasurer, minister of labour, minister of education, minister for public works and minister of marine.

However, Hall-Jones announced that he would only hold power until Sir Joseph Ward's return from abroad. Despite this, there was much speculation in the media that he might attempt to remain in office as Seddon himself had done in 1893.

== Later career ==
Hall-Jones accepted the Railways and Public Works portfolios in the subsequent Ward administration. Later, he succeeded William Pember Reeves as High Commissioner for New Zealand in London in December 1908, returned to New Zealand at the end of his term in 1912, and was appointed to the Legislative Council by Massey.

Hall-Jones died at his home in Wellington on 19 June 1936.

== See also ==
- Liberal Government of New Zealand

== Notes ==
Diplomatic posts
Preceded by William Pember Reeves	High Commissioner of New Zealand to the United Kingdom; 1908–1912	Succeeded by Thomas Mackenzie
Government offices
Preceded by Richard Seddon	Prime Minister of New Zealand; 1906	Succeeded by Sir Joseph Ward
Political offices
Preceded by Richard Seddon	Minister of Education; 1906	Succeeded by George Fowlds
Preceded by Sir Joseph Ward	Minister of Railways; 1906–1908	Succeeded by John A. Millar
Preceded by William Pember Reeves	Minister of Justice; 1896	Succeeded by Thomas Thompson
Preceded by Richard Seddon	Minister of Public Works; 1896-1908	Succeeded by Roderick McKenzie
New Zealand Parliament
Preceded by Richard Turnbull	Member of Parliament for Timaru; 1890–1908	Succeeded by James Craigie
