= 1865 Town of New Plymouth by-election =

New Zealand by-election

- 19 May 1865
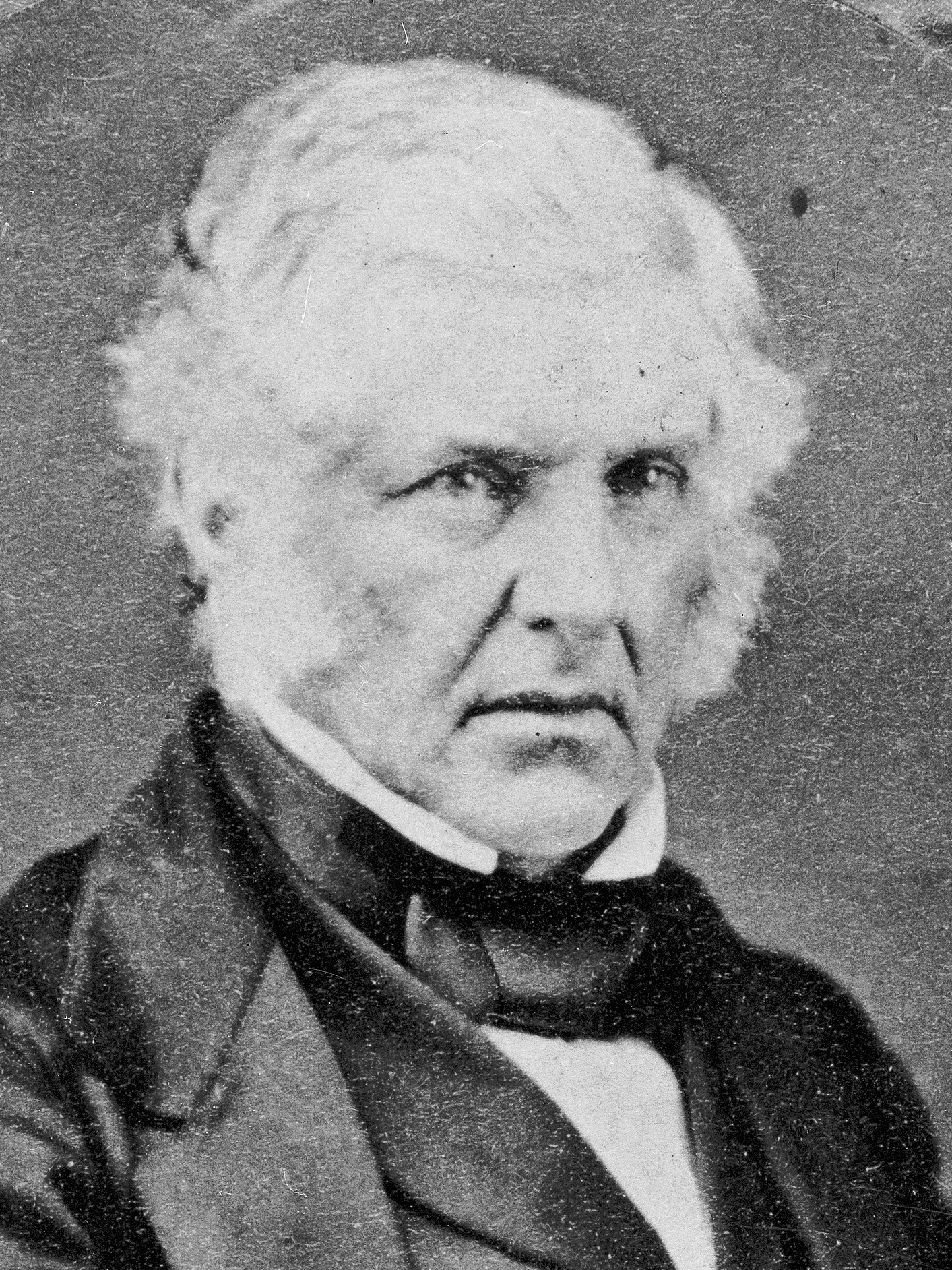
| Candidate | Henry Sewell |
| Party | Independent |
| Popular vote | elected unopposed |
MP before election
Charles Brown
Independent
Elected MP
Henry Sewell
Independent

The 1865 Town of New Plymouth by-election was a by-election held in the Town of New Plymouth electorate during the 3rd New Zealand Parliament, on 19 May 1865. The by-election was caused by the resignation of the incumbent, Charles Brown, and was won unopposed by Henry Sewell. Whilst Sewell was not a local resident, he was a member of the government through his appointment to the Legislative Council, the upper house of Parliament. Sewell accepted the invitation to represent the electorate, as him becoming a member of the lower house was seen to strengthen the government.

== Background ==
=== Charles Brown ===
Aged 33, Brown had been elected the first Superintendent of the Taranaki Province in 1853. He had served until his defeat in 1857 and had been re-elected in 1861, and held that post at the time of the 1865 by-election. Brown had first been elected to the New Zealand House of Representatives in the 1855 election in the Grey and Bell electorate, another constituency in Taranaki. Since an 1864 by-election, he had been representing the Town of New Plymouth electorate.

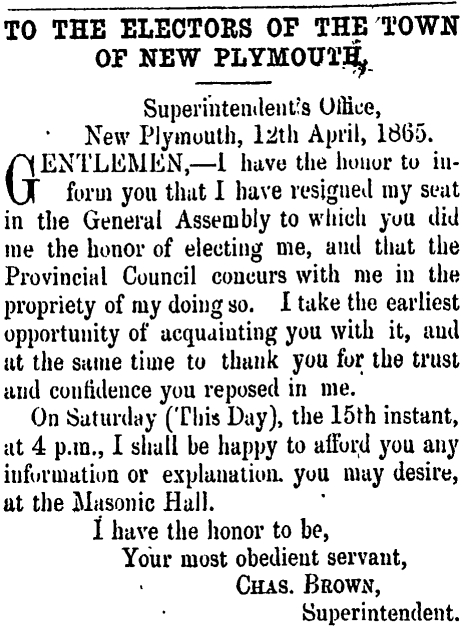
Brown's resignation, published on 15 April 1865 in the Taranaki Herald

Brown resigned from the House of Representatives on 12 April 1865, and informed the electors via an advertisement in the next edition of the Taranaki Herald of his decision. The advertisement called for a meeting on the day of its publication where Brown would outline his reasons for resigning. Due to the short notice, only ten electors came and the meeting was postponed by a week.

At the next meeting, again held at the Masonic Hall in New Plymouth, 50 electors turned up, and Thomas Kelly took the chair. Brown explained that his principal objective as a member of the House of Representatives was to "watch the progress" of the Taranaki compensation. This compensation was in relation to the First and Second Taranaki War, where settlers were commandeered by the government to join the local militia, and once under military command, they had to watch when their homesteads were destroyed and their cattle were stolen without being able to respond, and the military hierarchy would not let them. Henry Sewell estimated the loss to the settlers at close to £200,000. Another item of interest to him was the exchange of town sections, which the government had since assigned Henry Sewell to resolve. Brown noted that when Parliament was in session in Wellington, he could not simultaneously carry out his duties as Superintendent, as that required him to be in Taranaki, which caused problems for the province. The only issue that justified him remaining in the House of Representatives was to represent the area's interest with regards to the proposed harbour construction, but the cost estimate for this was still several months away. Attendees passed a motion that Brown had fulfilled his duties in an appropriate manner while he represented them in the House of Representatives.

=== Henry Sewell ===
Henry Sewell had first come to New Zealand as the deputy chairman (a paid position) of the Canterbury Association in February 1853. The Association was in financial crisis and Sewell was instrumental in resolving the debt issues for Canterbury Province. In August 1853 Sewell stood in New Zealand's first general election, winning the Town of Christchurch electorate, which he represented in the 1st New Zealand Parliament. Sewell was re-elected in the 1855 election and also elected onto the Canterbury Provincial Council for the Lyttelton electorate in 1855. In May 1856, he became New Zealand's first Premier. He resigned from Parliament later in 1856 but remained an unofficial member of Parliament's executive and returned to England on ministerial duties. Sewell returned to New Zealand in early 1859 and again took up a previous role as Colonial Treasurer. He was re-elected to the House of Representatives in an 1860 by-election and served until the end of the term in November 1860. At the end of the session, he was dissatisfied with the actions of his former fellow Government ministers and did not seek re-election. Instead, he was appointed Registrar-General of Lands by Edward Stafford. In August 1861, he was appointed to the New Zealand Legislative Council so that he could become part of the 2nd Fox Ministry as Attorney-General. By all accounts, Sewell was a senior politician.

== Election ==
Electors made a requisition to Henry Sewell, asking him to represent the electorate in the House of Representatives. The Taranaki Herald predicted that Sewell would accept the invitation, as it would strengthen the government by having him as a member of the lower house as opposed to the upper house. The Taranaki Herald further predicted that there would not be any opposition to Sewell's candidature.

Sewell, who at the time was in Wellington, placed an advertisement in the 6 May edition of the Taranaki Herald accepting the invitation. Sewell stated that he would continue to look after the interests of Taranaki as a member of the government. The acceptance was dated 24 April; there were no telegraphs to New Plymouth at that time, but mail was carried by ship. The Taranaki Herald put its support behind Sewell's candidature, too.

At the nomination meeting on 19 May, Sewell was the only person proposed. He was thus declared elected unopposed by the returning officer. Sewell resigned from the Legislative Council three days later.

James Crowe Richmond was appointed to the Legislative Council to fill the vacancy left by Sewell. Richmond was appointed on 8 July 1865, which was soon after the 3rd Parliament began its fifth session. Sewell represented the Town of New Plymouth electorate until the end of the term in 1866, when he returned to live in England for some years.

== Citations ==
- Jackson, William Keith (1972). The New Zealand Legislative Council : a study of the establishment, failure and abolition of an upper house. Dunedin: University of Otago Press.
- McIntyre, W. David (1980). The Journal of Henry Sewell 1853–7. Vol. II. Christchurch: Whitcoulls Publishers. ISBN 0-7233-0625-7.
- Scholefield, Guy, ed. (1940). A Dictionary of New Zealand Biography : A–L (PDF). Vol. I. Wellington: Department of Internal Affairs.
- Scholefield, Guy (1950) [First ed. published 1913]. New Zealand Parliamentary Record, 1840–1949 (3rd ed.). Wellington: Govt. Printer.
- Wilson, Jim (1985) [First published in 1913]. New Zealand Parliamentary Record, 1840–1984 (4th ed.). Wellington: V.R. Ward, Govt. Printer. OCLC 154283103.
