= 1858 Grey and Bell by-election =

New Zealand by-election

The Grey and Bell by-election 1858 was a by-election held in the Grey and Bell electorate during the 2nd New Zealand Parliament, on 17 May 1858, and was, the second by-election in the electorate.

== Background ==
The by-election was caused by the resignation of incumbent MP John Lewthwaite and was won by Charles Brown (who had previously resigned the seat, forcing the by-election that returned Lewthwaite). Electors signed a requisition for Dillon Bell, who was not a resident of the district, and who was not in the district prior to the election. No formal response was received by the electors from Bell; apparently, there was a delay in him receiving the requisition. Thomas Hirst advertised that he would contest the election in case that Bell would not stand.

At the nomination meeting on 15 May, Bell was nominated in absentia by Captain Henry King and James Crowe Richmond. Another elector, Mr Watt, guaranteed that Bell had conveyed to him by private mail that he would represent the electorate, but that he would not wish to stand for election if either Mr King or Mr Thomas Hurst intended to stand against him.

Charles Brown, who had signed the Bell requisition, then came forward and offered himself as a candidate as no official response had been received from Bell. Brown was formally nominated by John Hursthouse (the husband of Richmond's aunt Helen Hursthouse, née Wilson) and seconded by Mr Sunley. Brown stated that he had been asked by Harry Atkinson, a member of the Taranaki provincial council (and later Premier of New Zealand), to stand for election to prevent the return of Hirst.

Thomas Hirst was the third person to be nominated. With regards to his earlier pledge of not contesting the election against Bell, he stated that since no formal reply had been received, he felt that he had not broken his pledge.

After a show of hands in favour of Bell, Brown's supporters demanded a poll; only two attendees had shown their support for Hirst. Charles Brown was subsequently elected on 17 May, with 75 votes for Brown and 61 votes for Bell. Hirst declined to stand in favour of Brown.

== Results ==
1858 Grey and Bell by-election
Party	Candidate	Votes	%	±%
Independent	Charles Brown	75	55.1	
Independent	Dillon Bell	61	44.9	
Majority		14		
Turnout		136		
