= William Crompton (politician) =

New Zealand politician

William Morgan Crompton (1811 – 27 December 1886) was a New Zealand politician.

== Early life and career ==
Crompton was born in Birmingham, England, in 1811, and received his education at an academy in Bristol run by Lant Carpenter. Crompton's father was a merchant trading with Brazil. He lived in northern France for some years and held a scholastic appointment. During this time, he took on the Catholic faith. He emigrated from England on the Lord William Bentinck and arrived in New Plymouth on 6 January 1852, and took land in nearby Omata. Later in 1852, he was the Taranaki Herald's first editor, but resigned after nine editions had been printed over a disagreement with the owners of the newspaper.

New Zealand Parliament
| Years | Term | Electorate | Party |
|---|---|---|---|
| 1853–1855 | 1st | Omata | Independent |

== Member of Parliament ==
Crompton served in the 1st New Zealand Parliament as the representative for the Omata electorate. In the 1853 election, he was declared elected unopposed. He was ill in 1855 and initially feared that he could not attend the parliamentary session in Auckland, but he did go in the end. His ongoing illness prevented him from declaring his intentions prior to the 1855 election and when it appeared that the Omata electorate would not have a representative, Alfred William East stepped forward and became a candidate. In the end, the election was contested by Crompton, but East had a majority of six votes. Crompton did not serve in any further Parliaments.

== Later career ==
He was later a member of the Taranaki Provincial Council and continuously represented the Omata electorate from January 1862 until the abolition of provincial government in October 1876. He was Deputy Superintend of Taranaki Province on three occasions: in 1863–64 under Charles Brown, in 1870–74 under Frederic Carrington, and from June 1876 once again under Carrington. He was the council's speaker from August 1862 until abolition 14 years later. As a member of the Taranaki Waste Lands Board, he oversaw the establishment of towns in Taranaki including Inglewood, which he had tried to name after the poet Milton, and Stratford-upon-Patea (later renamed simply Stratford), after Stratford-upon-Avon, the birthplace of William Shakespeare.

His house and property were destroyed in the First Taranaki War. After the Second Taranaki War was over, Crompton opened an academy in New Plymouth and ran it until 1884, when he retired for health reasons. He was a member of many organisations and was for many years Deputy Sheriff. He was an active member of the Catholic church.

== Death ==
Crompton was affected by a paralytic stroke for the last two years of his life. He died on 27 December 1886 and was survived by his wife, two daughters, and one son. He was buried at Te Henui Cemetery.

== Notes ==
New Zealand Parliament
| New constituency | Member of Parliament for Omata; 1853–1855 | Succeeded by Alfred William East |
