= 1869 Town of New Plymouth by-election =

New Zealand by-election

The 1869 Town of New Plymouth by-election was a by-election held on 28 April 1869 in the Town of New Plymouth electorate during the 4th New Zealand Parliament.

The by-election was caused by the resignation of the incumbent, Harry Atkinson on 18 March 1869.

He was replaced by Thomas Kelly.

This by-election required a poll, unlike previous by-elections in the Town of New Plymouth (1862 by-election, 1863 by-election, 1864 by-election, 1865 by-election and 1867 by-election) when the sole candidate was unopposed and was declared the winner without a show of hands or poll.

Frederic Carrington, who came second, was described as the Father of New Plymouth.

After the returning officer had declared the result of the poll, the candidate Mr Upjohn asked if he could have the names of the 15 people who voted for him; the returning officer said he would have to ask for permission from the Government.

== Result ==
The following table gives the election result:

1869 Town of New Plymouth by-election
Party	Candidate	Votes	%	±%
Independent	Thomas Kelly	57	48.72	
Independent	Frederic Carrington	45	38.46	
Independent	James Thomas Upjohn	15	12.82	
Majority		12	10.26	
Turnout		117		
