= 4th New Zealand Parliament =

Term of the Parliament of New Zealand

4th Parliament of New Zealand
←	3rd Parliament	5th Parliament	→

Overview
- Legislative body: New Zealand Parliament
- Term: 30 June 1866 – 13 September 1870
- Election: 1866 New Zealand general election
- Government: Second Stafford ministry (until 1869); Third Fox ministry (from 1869)

House of Representatives
- Members: 70
- Speaker of the House: David Monro
- Colonial Secretary: William Fox — Edward Stafford until 28 June 1869

Legislative Council
- Members: 35 (at start)
- Speaker of the Council: John Richardson — Thomas Bartley until 1 July 1868

Sovereign
- Monarch: HM Victoria
- Governor: HE Rt. Hon Sir George Bowen — HE Rt. Hon Sir George Grey until 5 February 1868

The 4th New Zealand Parliament was a term of the Parliament of New Zealand.

Elections for this term were held in 61 electorates between 12 February and 6 April 1866 to elect 70 MPs. Parliament was prorogued in late 1870. During the term of this Parliament, two Ministries were in power. During this term, four Māori electorates were first established in 1867, and the first elections held in 1868.

== Sessions ==
The 4th Parliament opened on 30 June 1866, following the 1866 general election. It sat for five sessions, and was prorogued on 6 December 1875.

Session	Opened	Adjouned
first	30 June 1866	8 October 1866
second	9 July 1867	10 October 1867
third	9 July 1868	20 October 1868
fourth	1 June 1869	3 September 1869
fifth	14 June 1870	13 September 1870

== Historical context ==
Political parties had not been established yet; this only happened after the 1890 election. Anyone attempting to form an administration thus had to win support directly from individual MPs. This made first forming, and then retaining a government difficult and challenging.

The 4th Parliament sat during the time of the New Zealand Wars, with the Second Taranaki War proceeding at the beginning of this Parliament's term. The Otago gold rush was coming to an end, but the West Coast gold rush had only just begun.

The capital had moved from Auckland to Wellington in 1865. Parliament was meeting in the Provincial Council buildings. With the increase in the number of Members of Parliament to 70, conditions became very crowded. The original building "grew like topsy" until the end of the 19th century, and was consumed by fire on 11 December 1907.

In 1868, the first elections were held in the four Māori electorates that were created in the previous year.

== Ministries ==
A few months before the 1866 general elections, Edward Stafford became Premier for the second time. On 16 October 1865, the second Stafford Ministry was formed. This lasted well into the term of the 4th Parliament on 28 June 1869.

The premiership changed back to William Fox. The third Fox Ministry was in place from 28 June 1869 to 10 September 1872, well into the term of the 5th Parliament.

== Electorates ==
61 electorates were used for the 1866 elections. This was a significant increase from the 43 electorates used in the previous (1860–1861) election, and resulted from the Representation Act 1865. The bill had its third reading and was assented in October 1865.

== Initial composition of the 4th Parliament ==
70 seats were created across the 61 electorates. The City of Wellington electorate was the only three-member electorate, and seven electorates were represented by two members. The remaining 53 electorates were represented by a single member.

Member	Electorate	Province	MP's term	Election date
George Armstrong	Akaroa	Canterbury	First	21 February
Lancelot Walker	Ashley	Canterbury	Second	2 March
Archibald Clark	Auckland East	Auckland	Second	12 February
James Williamson	Auckland West	Auckland	Second	13 February
John Williamson	Auckland West	Auckland	Third	13 February
Crosbie Ward	Avon	Canterbury	Third	20 February
Hugh Carleton	Bay of Islands	Auckland	Fourth	5 March
John Cargill	Bruce	Otago	Third	7 March
Arthur Burns	Caversham	Otago	Second	16 March
David Monro	Cheviot	Canterbury	Third	19 February
James FitzGerald	City of Christchurch	Canterbury	Fourth	12 February
John Ormond	Clive	Hawke's Bay	Second	17 March
James Macandrew	Clutha	Otago	Fourth	9 March
John Cracroft Wilson	Coleridge	Canterbury	Second	31 January
Andrew Richmond	Collingwood	Nelson	Second	9 March
William Reynolds	City of Dunedin	Otago	Second	9 March
James Paterson	City of Dunedin	Otago	Second	9 March
Theodore Haultain	Franklin	Auckland	Third	22 February
Robert Graham	Franklin	Auckland	Second	22 February
Francis Jollie	Gladstone	Canterbury	Second	23 February
Charles O'Neill	Goldfields	Otago	First	26 February
Julius Vogel	Goldfields	Otago	Second	26 February
James Bradshaw	Gold Field Towns	Otago	First	16 March
James Richmond	Grey and Bell	Taranaki	Second	2 March
Charles Haughton	Hampden	Otago	Second	5 March
John Hall	Heathcote	Canterbury	Second	1 March
William Fitzherbert	Hutt	Wellington	Third	28 February
Alfred Ludlam	Hutt	Wellington	Third	28 February
William Wood	Invercargill	Southland	First	9 March
Joseph Beswick	Kaiapoi	Canterbury	First	16 February
Edward Hargreaves	Town of Lyttelton	Canterbury	First	3 March
William Baldwin	Manuherikia	Otago	Second	17 March
Francis Hull	Marsden	Auckland	First	5 March
Dillon Bell	Mataura	Southland	Third	10 March
Thomas Ball	Mongonui	Auckland	First	20 March
Charles Parker	Motueka	Nelson	Second	2 March
William Sefton Moorhouse^{a}	Mount Herbert	Canterbury	First	22 February
Donald McLean	Napier	Hawke's Bay	First	20 March
Oswald Curtis	City of Nelson	Nelson	First	20 February
Edward Stafford	City of Nelson	Nelson	Third	20 February
William Wells	Suburbs of Nelson	Nelson	Third	15 February
John Richardson	New Plymouth	Taranaki	Second	16 March
George Graham	Newton	Auckland	Second	15 February
James O'Neill	Northern Division	Auckland	Third	14 February
Thomas Henderson	Northern Division	Auckland	Third	14 February
Robert Campbell	Oamaru	Otago	First	23 March
Arthur Atkinson	Omata	Taranaki	First	9 March
Maurice O'Rorke	Town of Onehunga	Auckland	Second	20 February
Frederick Whitaker	Parnell	Auckland	First	16 February
Paul de Quincey	Pensioner Settlements	Auckland	First	15 February
Arthur Beauchamp	Picton	Marlborough	First	14 March
Alfred Brandon	Porirua	Wellington	Third	5 March
Thomas Dick	Port Chalmers	Otago	Second	17 March
Joseph Newman	Raglan	Auckland	First	23 February
William Watt	Rangitiki	Wellington	First	8 March
Donald Hankinson	Riverton	Southland	First	26 February
George Hepburn	Roslyn	Otago	First	22 March
Edward Stevens	Selwyn	Canterbury	First	26 February
Donald Reid	Taieri	Otago	First	7 March
Alfred Cox	Timaru	Canterbury	Second	20 February
William Murison	Waikouaiti	Otago	First	28 February
Arthur Oliver	Waimea	Marlborough	First	23 February
Henry Bunny	Wairarapa	Wellington	Second	3 March
William Eyes	Wairau	Marlborough	Second	23 February
Alexander McNeill	Wallace	Otago	First	6 April
John Bryce	Wanganui	Wellington	First	3 March
William Taylor	City of Wellington	Wellington	Second	1 March
Isaac Featherston	City of Wellington	Wellington	Fourth	1 March
Charles Borlase	City of Wellington	Wellington	First	1 March
William Sefton Moorhouse^{a}	Westland	Canterbury	Fourth	16 March

^{a} Moorhouse was elected in both the Mount Herbert and Westland electorates. He chose to represent Westland.

== Changes during term ==
There were numerous changes during the term of the 4th Parliament.

By-election	Electorate	Date	Incumbent	Reason	Winner
1866	Mount Herbert	27 July	William Moorhouse	Chose to represent Westland	Thomas Potts
1866	Port Chalmers	15 December	Thomas Dick	Resignation	Thomas Dick
1867	City of Dunedin	19 January	William Reynolds	Resignation	William Reynolds
1867	City of Christchurch	13 February	James FitzGerald	Resignation	William Travers
1867	Avon	11 March	Crosbie Ward	Resignation	William Reeves
1867	City of Auckland West	25 April	James Williamson	Resignation	Patrick Dignan
1867	Manuherikia	27 April	William Baldwin	Resignation	David Mervyn
1867	Wanganui	27 April	John Bryce	Resignation	Henry Harrison
1867	Town of New Plymouth	29 April	John Richardson	Resignation	Harry Atkinson
1867	Raglan	4 June	Joseph Newman	Resignation	James Farmer
1867	Parnell	5 June	Frederick Whitaker	Resignation	Charles Heaphy
1867	Port Chalmers	15 June	Thomas Dick	Resignation	David Main
1867	Waimea	28 June	Arthur Oliver	Resignation	Edward Baigent
1867	Lyttelton	1 July	Edward Hargreaves	Resignation	George Macfarlan
1867	Northern Division	1 July	Thomas Henderson	Resignation	Thomas Macfarlane
1867	Kaiapoi	5 July	Joseph Beswick	Resignation	John Studholme
1867	Picton	25 July	Arthur Beauchamp	Resignation	William Adams
1867	Pensioner Settlements	5 August	Paul de Quincey	Resignation	John Kerr
1867	Ashley	7 August	Lancelot Walker	Resignation	Henry Tancred
1868	Omata	7 February	Arthur Atkinson	Resignation	Charles Brown
1868	Collingwood	18 March	Andrew Richmond	Resignation	Arthur Collins
1868	Westland Boroughs	3 April	William Moorhouse	Resignation	William Harrison
==== Supplementary election, 1868 ====
Westland North		9 April 1868			Timothy Gallagher
Westland South		6 April 1868			Edmund Barff
==== First Māori elections ====
Eastern Maori		15 April 1868			Tāreha Te Moananui
Northern Maori		15 April 1868			Frederick Russell
Southern Maori		20 June 1868			John Patterson
Western Maori		1 May 1868			Mete Kīngi Paetahi
By-election	Electorate	Date	Incumbent	Reason	Winner
==== 4th Parliament (continued) ====
1868	Avon	8 June	William Reeves	Resignation	William Rolleston
1868	Picton	11 June	William Adams	Resignation	Courtney Kenny
1868	Rangitiki	22 June	William Watt	Resignation	William Fox
1868	Franklin	2 July	Robert Graham	Resignation	William Swan
1868	Waikouaiti	27 July	William Murison	Resignation	Robert Mitchell
1868	Lyttelton	2 November	George Macfarlan	Death	John Peacock
1868	Timaru	20 November	Alfred Cox	Resignation	Edward Stafford
1868	City of Nelson	24 December	Edward Stafford	Resignation	Nathaniel Edwards
1869	Marsden	25 January	Francis Hull	Resignation	John Munro
1869	Roslyn	12 February	George Hepburn	Resignation	Henry Driver
1869	City of Dunedin	5 March	James Paterson	Resignation	Thomas Birch
1869	Northern Division	15 March	James O'Neill	Resignation	Harry Farnall
1869	Newton	19 March	George Graham	Resignation	Robert Creighton
1869	Waikouaiti	27 April	Robert Mitchell	Resignation	Francis Rich
1869	Town of New Plymouth	28 April	Harry Atkinson	Resignation	Thomas Kelly
1869 (1st)	Wallace	30 April	Alexander McNeill	Resignation	Cuthbert Cowan
1869	Oamaru	25 May	Robert Campbell	Resignation	Charles Graham
1869	Taieri	19 June	Donald Reid	Resignation	Henry Howorth
1869 (2nd)	Wallace	17 September	Cuthbert Cowan	Resignation	George Webster
1870	Bruce	21 March	John Cargill	Resignation	James Brown
1870	Mongonui	30 March	Thomas Ball	Resignation	Thomas Gillies
1870	Caversham	25 April	Arthur John Burns	Resignation	James McIndoe
1870	Omata	27 April	Charles Brown	Resignation	Frederic Carrington
1870	Parnell	12 May	Charles Heaphy	Resignation	Reader Wood
1870	Riverton	18 May	Donald Hankinson	Resignation	Lauchlan McGillivray
1870	Westland North	2 July	Timothy Gallagher	Resignation	Thomas Kynnersley
1870	City of Christchurch	12 August	William Travers	Resignation	William Moorhouse

=== Existing electorates ===
Ashley

Walker resigned in 1867. Henry Tancred won the subsequent 1867 by-election.

Auckland West

James Williamson resigned in 1867. He was succeeded by Patrick Dignan.

Avon

Ward resigned in 1867. He was succeeded by William Reeves, who himself resigned in 1868. William Rolleston won the subsequent 1868 by-election.

Bruce

Cargill resigned in 1870 and was succeeded by James Clark Brown.

Caversham

Burns resigned in 1870 and was succeeded by James McIndoe.

City of Christchurch

FitzGerald resigned in 1867 and was succeeded by William Travers, who himself resigned in 1870. William Sefton Moorhouse took the seat for the remaining months in 1870.

City of Dunedin

Paterson resigned in 1869 and was succeeded by Thomas Birch.

City of Nelson

Stafford resigned in 1868 and was succeeded by Nathaniel Edwards.

Collingwood

Richmond resigned in 1868 and was succeeded by Arthur Shuckburgh Collins.

Kaiapoi

Beswick resigned in 1867. He was succeeded by John Studholme.

Manuherikia

Baldwin resigned in 1867. He was succeeded by David Mervyn.

Marsden

Hull resigned in 1868. He was succeeded by John Munro.

Mongonui

Ball resigned in 1870. He was succeeded by Thomas Gillies on 30 March 1870.

Mount Herbert

Moorhouse was elected in the Mount Herbert electorate on 22 February 1866. He also stood in the Westland electorate and was returned 16 March 1866. He chose to represent Westland. A by-election was held on 27 July 1866 and Thomas Potts was returned unopposed.

New Plymouth

Richardson resigned in 1867 and was succeeded by Harry Atkinson, who himself resigned in 1869. Thomas Kelly won the 1869 by-election.

Newton

Graham resigned in 1869 and was succeeded by Robert James Creighton.

Northern Division

Henderson resigned in 1867. The 6 July 1867 by-election was won by Thomas Macfarlane.

O'Neill resigned in 1869 and was succeeded by Henry Warner Farnall.

Oamaru

Campbell resigned in 1869 and was succeeded by Charles Christie Graham.

Omata

Atkinson resigned in 1867 and was succeeded in the 1868 by-election by Charles Brown, who himself resigned in 1870. Frederic Carrington was the successful candidate in the 1870 by-election.

Parnell

Whitaker resigned in 1867 and was succeeded by Charles Heaphy.

Pensioner Settlements

De Quincey resigned in 1867. The 5 August 1867 by-election was won by John Kerr. A second person, a Mr Jackson, was nominated, but the returning officer would not accept the nomination, as Jackson was not on the electoral roll. Thus, Kerr was declared elected unopposed.

Picton

Beauchamp resigned in 1867. He was succeeded by William Adams, who himself resigned in 1868. Courtney Kenny won the 1868 by-election.

Port Chalmers

Dick, who was elected on 17 March 1866, resigned on 15 October 1866. He successfully contested the 15 December 1866 by-election, but resigned again on 26 April 1867. David Forsyth Main successfully contested the 1867 by-election.

Raglan

Newman resigned in 1867. He was succeeded by James Farmer.

Rangitīkei

Watt resigned in 1868. He was succeeded by William Fox, who won the 1868 by-election.

Roslyn

Hepburn resigned in 1868. He was succeeded by Henry Driver.

Taieri

Reid resigned in 1869. He was succeeded by Henry Howorth.

Timaru

Cox resigned in 1868. He was succeeded by Edward Stafford.

Town of Lyttelton

Hargreaves resigned in 1867. He was succeeded by George Macfarlan, who won the 1867 by-election. Macfarlan died on 9 October 1868 and was succeeded by John Thomas Peacock in a 2 November 1868 by-election.

Waikouaiti

Murison resigned in 1868 and was succeeded by Robert Mitchell. Mitchell himself resigned in the following year and was replaced by Francis Rich.

Waimea

Oliver resigned in 1867. He was succeeded by Edward Baigent.

Wallace

McNeil resigned in 1869 and was succeeded by Cuthbert Cowan. Cowan himself resigned in the same year he got elected and was replaced by George Webster.

Westland

The Westland Representation Act 1867 introduced changes to the Waimea and Westland electorates. Their areas were reassigned and four electorates formed. Waimea lost some area, but continued to exist. Westland was abolished in 1867. A new electorate (Westland Boroughs) was established, and Moorhouse was transferred to it. Other new electorates, for which by-elections were to be held, were Westland North and Westland South.

=== New electorate ===
Westland Boroughs

Westland Boroughs was established through the Westland Representation Act 1867, and Moorhouse transferred to it. He resigned in 1868, and William Henry Harrison won the resulting 1868 by-election.

Westland North

Westland North was established through the Westland Representation Act 1867. Timothy Gallagher was its first representative, elected in the 9 April 1868 by-election. He resigned on 13 May 1870 and was succeeded by Thomas Kynnersley following a 2 July 1870 by-election.

Westland South

Westland South was established through the Westland Representation Act 1867. Edmund Barff was its representative, elected in the 6 April 1868 by-election.

=== Māori electorates ===
The first elections for the new Māori electorates were held in 1868.

Eastern Maori

Tāreha Te Moananui was the first representative for the Eastern Maori electorate.

Northern Maori

Frederick Nene Russell was the first representative for the Northern Maori electorate.

Southern Maori

John Patterson was the first representative for the Southern Maori electorate.

Western Maori

Mete Kīngi Paetahi was the first representative for the Western Maori electorate.
