= Minister for Māori Development =

New Zealand minister of the Crown

- Coat of arms of New Zealand

- Flag of New Zealand

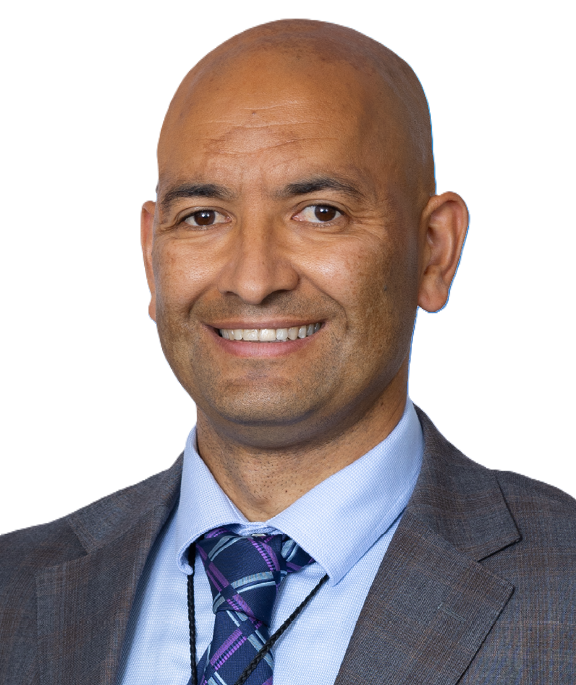
- Incumbent; Tama Potaka since 27 November 2023
- Ministry of Maori Development
- Style: The Honourable
- Member of: Executive Council
- Reports to: Prime Minister of New Zealand
- Appointer: Governor-General of New Zealand
- Term length: At His Majesty's pleasure
- Formation: 27 August 1858
- First holder: William Richmond
- Salary: $243,841
- Website: Ministry of Māori Development

The Minister for Māori Development is the minister in the New Zealand Government with broad responsibility for government policy towards Māori, the first inhabitants of New Zealand. The Minister heads Te Puni Kōkiri (TPK, or the Ministry of Māori Development). Between 1947 and 2014 the position was called Minister of Māori Affairs; before that it was known as Minister of Native Affairs. The current Minister for Māori Development is Tama Potaka.

== Role ==
The role of the Minister for Māori Development differs from those of other ministers. While the Minister for Māori Development does have a government department to supervise (Te Puni Kōkiri, TPK for short, or the Ministry of Māori Development), he or she also has input into other portfolios to the extent that they affect Māori. For example, the Minister for Māori Development would expect to be involved in the development of Māori language policy in the education portfolio, even though education is normally the sole responsibility of the Minister of Education.

== History ==
The office was originally called Minister of Native Affairs, or simply Native Minister. Most early Ministers of Native Affairs were not Māori, although a convention existed that there should be Māori in Cabinet (albeit without portfolio). Prior to the implementation of responsible government, Māori affairs (specifically the purchase of land from Māori by the Crown) had been handled by the Governor.

Attitudes of early Ministers were varied. The first Minister, William Richmond, considered Māori to be savages, and believed that his task was to "reform" Māori by making them more like Europeans. He was particularly hostile to Māori tradition of shared land ownership, considering it "beastly communism". Other Ministers were more friendly to Māori interests — James FitzGerald, the sixth Minister, believed that peaceful co-existence with Māori was vital, and considered the confiscation of Māori land to be an "enormous crime". Other Ministers have varied between these positions.

The first Minister of Native Affairs to be ethnically Māori was James Carroll, appointed by the Liberal Party in the late 19th century. Another prominent Minister of Native Affairs was Āpirana Ngata, also of the Liberals. For the most part, however, early Ministers were Pākehā, although were frequently advised by Māori colleagues. Maui Pomare of the Reform Party and Eruera Tirikatene of the Labour Party were examples of politicians who played a major role in the portfolio without actually holding office. After Carroll and Ngata, it was not until Matiu Rata (1972–1975) that there was another ethnically Māori Minister of Māori Affairs.

Under the Maori Purposes Act 1947, the Ministerial title and all other government usage was changed from 'Native' to 'Maori'.

== 1972 to present ==
Matiu Rata, appointed as the Minister of Māori Affairs in 1972, the first Maori since Ngata was Minister of Native Affairs in 1928.

After the 2014 general election cabinet reshuffle, the title was changed from Minister of Māori Affairs to Minister for Māori Development. While Prime Minister John Key said that there was not really any difference in what the portfolio would involve, "it gives you a sense of where the minister [Flavell] will want to shape the portfolio". During the 2014–2017 term of the Fifth National Government, Te Ururoa Flavell served as the Minister for Māori Development.

Following the formation of the Sixth Labour Government, Nanaia Mahuta was appointed as Minister for Māori Development.

== List of ministers ==
The table below lists ministers who have held responsibility for Māori issues. Initially, the title used was Minister of Native Affairs, but the title was changed to Minister of Maori Affairs on 17 December 1947 and then to Minister of Māori Affairs with the insertion of the macron in modern orthography under the Māori Language Commission. In 2014, the title was changed for a fourth time to Minister for Māori Development.

Key

Independent Liberal Reform United Labour National NZ First Mauri Pacific Māori Party

No.	Name	Portrait	Was Māori?	Term of office		Prime Minister
As Minister of Native Affairs
1	William Richmond		No	27 August 1858	10 November 1860	Stafford
2	Frederick Weld		No	10 November 1860	12 July 1861	Stafford
3	Walter Mantell		No	12 July 1861	18 December 1861	Fox
4	Dillon Bell		No	6 August 1862	30 October 1863	Domett
5	William Fox		No	18 December 1861	30 October 1863	Whitaker
(3)	Walter Mantell		No	30 October 1863	27 July 1865	Weld
6	James FitzGerald		No	27 July 1865	16 October 1865	Weld
7	Andrew Russell		No	16 October 1865	24 August 1866	Stafford
8	James Crowe Richmond		No	24 August 1866	28 June 1869	Stafford
9	Donald McLean		No	28 June 1869	7 December 1876	Fox
9	Donald McLean		No	28 June 1869	7 December 1876	Waterhouse
9	Donald McLean		No	28 June 1869	7 December 1876	Fox
9	Donald McLean		No	28 June 1869	7 December 1876	Vogel
9	Donald McLean		No	28 June 1869	7 December 1876	Pollen
9	Donald McLean		No	28 June 1869	7 December 1876	Vogel
9	Donald McLean		No	28 June 1869	7 December 1876	Atkinson
10	Daniel Pollen		No	18 December 1876	13 October 1877	Atkinson
11	John Sheehan		No	15 October 1877	8 October 1879	Grey
12	John Bryce		No	8 October 1879	21 January 1881	Hall
13	William Rolleston		No	4 February 1881	19 October 1881	Hall
(12)	John Bryce		No	19 October 1881	16 August 1884	Hall
(12)	John Bryce		No	19 October 1881	16 August 1884	Whitaker
(12)	John Bryce		No	19 October 1881	16 August 1884	Atkinson
14	John Ballance		No	16 August 1884; 3 September 1884	28 August 1884; 8 October 1887	Stout
15	Edwin Mitchelson		No	8 October 1887	24 January 1891	Atkinson
(14)	John Ballance		No	24 January 1891	4 February 1891	Ballance
16	Alfred Cadman		No	4 February 1891	29 June 1893	Ballance
16	Alfred Cadman		No	4 February 1891	29 June 1893	Seddon
17	Richard Seddon		No	29 June 1893	21 December 1899	Seddon
18	James Carroll		Yes	21 December 1899	28 March 1912	Seddon
18	James Carroll		Yes	21 December 1899	28 March 1912	Hall-Jones
18	James Carroll		Yes	21 December 1899	28 March 1912	Ward
19	William MacDonald		No	28 March 1912	10 July 1912	Mackenzie
20	William Herries		No	10 July 1912	7 February 1921	Massey
21	Gordon Coates		No	7 February 1921	10 December 1928	Massey
21	Gordon Coates		No	7 February 1921	10 December 1928	Bell
21	Gordon Coates		No	7 February 1921	10 December 1928	Coates
22	Āpirana Ngata		Yes	10 December 1928	1 November 1934	Ward
22	Āpirana Ngata		Yes	10 December 1928	1 November 1934	Forbes
23	George Forbes		No	1 November 1934	6 December 1935	Forbes
24	Michael Joseph Savage		No	6 December 1935	27 March 1940	Savage
25	Frank Langstone		No	1 April 1940	21 December 1942	Fraser
26	Rex Mason		No	7 July 1943	19 December 1946	Fraser
27	Peter Fraser		No	19 December 1946	17 December 1947	Fraser
As Minister of Maori Affairs
(27)	Peter Fraser		No	17 December 1947	13 December 1949	Fraser
28	Ernest Corbett		No	13 December 1949	26 September 1957	Holland
28	Ernest Corbett		No	13 December 1949	26 September 1957	Holyoake
29	Keith Holyoake		No	26 September 1957	12 December 1957	Holyoake
30	Walter Nash		No	12 December 1957	12 December 1960	Nash
31	Ralph Hanan		No	12 December 1960	24 July 1969	Holyoake
32	Duncan MacIntyre		No	22 December 1969	8 December 1972	Holyoake
32	Duncan MacIntyre		No	22 December 1969	8 December 1972	Marshall
33	Matiu Rata		Yes	8 December 1972	12 December 1975	Kirk
33	Matiu Rata		Yes	8 December 1972	12 December 1975	Rowling
(32)	Duncan MacIntyre		No	12 December 1975	13 December 1978	Muldoon
34	Ben Couch		Yes	13 December 1978	26 July 1984	Muldoon
35	Koro Wētere		Yes	26 July 1984	2 November 1990	Lange
35	Koro Wētere		Yes	26 July 1984	2 November 1990	Palmer
35	Koro Wētere		Yes	26 July 1984	2 November 1990	Moore
36	Winston Peters		Yes	2 November 1990	2 October 1991	Bolger
37	Doug Kidd		No	2 October 1991	6 November 1993	Bolger
38	John Luxton		No	6 November 1993	12 October 1996	Bolger
39	Tau Henare		Yes	12 October 1996	10 December 1999	Bolger
39	Tau Henare		Yes	12 October 1996	10 December 1999	Shipley
40	Dover Samuels		Yes	10 December 1999	28 June 2000	Clark
41	Parekura Horomia		Yes	26 July 2000	19 November 2008	Clark
As Minister for Māori Affairs
42	Pita Sharples		Yes	19 November 2008	8 October 2014	Key
As Minister for Māori Development
43	Te Ururoa Flavell		Yes	8 October 2014	21 October 2017	Key
43	Te Ururoa Flavell		Yes	8 October 2014	21 October 2017	English
44	Nanaia Mahuta		Yes	26 October 2017	6 November 2020	Ardern
45	Willie Jackson		Yes	6 November 2020	27 November 2023	Ardern
45	Willie Jackson		Yes	6 November 2020	27 November 2023	Hipkins
46	Tama Potaka		Yes	27 November 2023	present	Luxon
