= Henry Richmond (politician) =

New Zealand politician

3rd Superintendent of Taranaki Province
- In office 7 September 1865 – 8 September 1869
- Preceded by: Charles Brown
- Succeeded by: Frederic Carrington

Personal details
- Born: Henry Robert Richmond; June 1829 London, England
- Died: 7 December 1890 (aged 61) Christchurch, New Zealand
- Spouses: Mary Blanche Hursthouse (m. 1858; died 1864) Emma Jane Parris (m. 1868)
- Relatives: James Crowe Richmond (brother); Jane Maria Atkinson (sister); William Richmond (brother); Arthur Atkinson Sr. (brother-in-law); Charles Wilson Hursthouse (brother-in-law); Richmond Hursthouse (brother-in-law); Clifford Richmond (grandson); Dolla Richmond (niece); Mary Richmond (niece); Arthur Atkinson Jr. (nephew)

Henry Robert Richmond (June 1829 – 7 December 1890) was a 19th-century New Zealand politician and farmer. He was Superintendent of Taranaki Province from 1865 to 1869.

== Biography ==
Born in London, England, in June 1869, Richmond was the brother of James Crowe Richmond, Jane Maria Atkinson and William Richmond. They were part of the Richmond-Atkinson family of Taranaki who were all related by marriage. Henry Richmond was educated at University College School, and then at University College London where he studied mathematics and chemistry. Richmond emigrated to New Zealand in 1851 with his brother, James.

Richmond married Mary Blanche Hursthouse (1840–1864) in 1858, and then Emma Jane Parris (1845–1921) in 1868. He had four children by Mary and three by Emma.

After serving as Superintendent of Taranaki Province between 1865 and 1869, Richmond moved to Nelson, where he studied law in the offices of Fell and Atkinson. Following his admission as a barrister and solicitor, he returned to New Plymouth in 1875, where he practised until shortly before his death. Richmond sought medical advice in Christchurch in late 1890, and died there on 7 December of that year. He was buried at Addington Cemetery.

Political offices
Preceded by Charles Brown	Superintendent of Taranaki Province; 1865–1869	Succeeded by Frederic Carrington
