= William Richmond (politician) =

New Zealand politician (1821–1895)

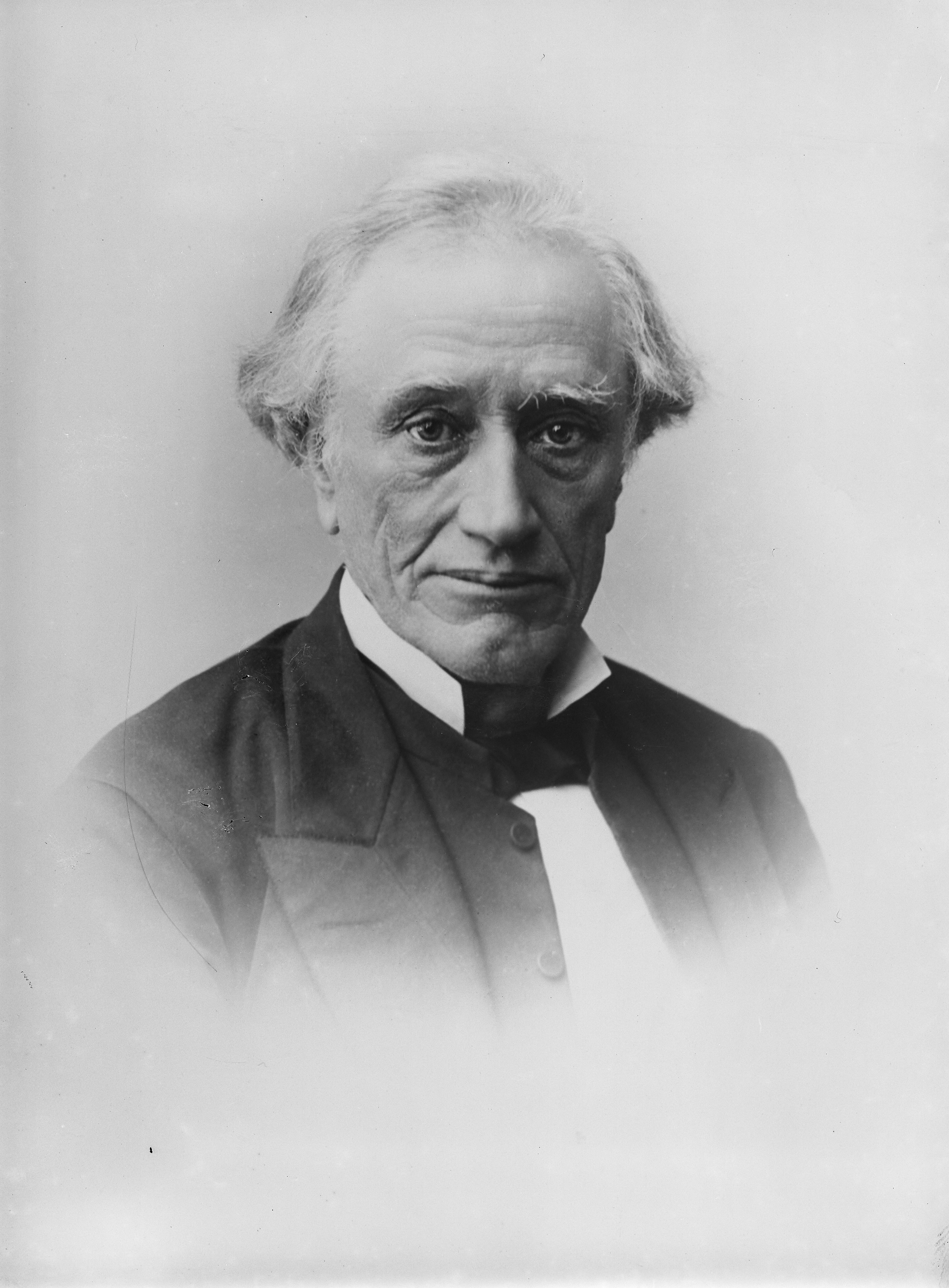
- Judge Christopher William Richmond ca 1888

5th Colonial Secretary
- In office 2 June 1856 – 4 November 1856
- Prime Minister: Edward Stafford

6th Colonial Treasurer
- In office 4 November 1856 – 25 February 1859
- Prime Minister: Edward Stafford
- In office 26 April 1859 – 12 July 1861
- Prime Minister: Edward Stafford

1st Minister of Native Affairs
- In office 27 August 1858 – 10 November 1860
- Prime Minister: Edward Stafford

Member of the New Zealand Parliament for Town of New Plymouth
- In office 1855–1862

Personal details
- Born: Christopher William Richmond; 12 July 1821 London, England
- Died: 3 August 1895 (aged 74) Wellington, New Zealand
- Spouse: Emily Elizabeth Atkinson
- Children: Nine, including Mary Richmond
- Relatives: James Crowe Richmond (brother); Henry Richmond (brother); Maria Atkinson (sister); Walter Fell (son-in-law); Maxwell Richmond (grandson); William Richmond Fell (grandson)
- Occupation: Lawyer, politician, judge

Christopher William Richmond (12 July 1821 – 3 August 1895), generally called William Richmond, was a 19th-century New Zealand politician. He held a number of Cabinet positions between 1856 and 1861. He worked as a lawyer and was appointed a senior judge.

== Early life ==
Richmond was probably born in London on 12 July 1821. His father, Christopher Richmond, died when William Richmond was only ten years old, leaving William in the sole care of Maria (Lely) Wilson, his mother. He was raised in the Unitarian faith, and attended Unitarian schools. His health was always delicate, and he suffered from severe asthma throughout his life. From 1841 to 1843, he was in France, but in 1844, he began working in various law offices. He also developed a strong friendship with Richard Holt Hutton, a writer and theologian who influenced his views considerably.

== Emigration to New Zealand ==
Richmond became a practising lawyer in 1847, but business was poor. James Crowe Richmond and Henry Richmond, his two younger brothers, sought better fortunes in New Plymouth, New Zealand, in 1850, and William Richmond considered joining them. On 15 September 1852, Richmond married Emily Elizabeth Atkinson, described by Joseph Hutton (father of Richmond's friend Richard Holt Hutton) as "a remarkable woman of singular intellectual power, moral earnestness and charming spontaneity of character". Shortly after their marriage, the two set out for New Zealand on the Sir Edward Paget, being joined by his mother, his sister, and Harry and Arthur Atkinson (two brothers of Emily; Harry would later become Premier). In New Plymouth, Richmond re-established his law practice, and soon became a prominent member of the local community.

== Political career ==
New Zealand Parliament
Years	Term	Electorate	Party
1855–1860	2nd	Town of New Plymouth	Independent
1860–1862	3rd	Town of New Plymouth	Independent

On 5 November 1855, he was elected to represent the Town of New Plymouth electorate in the 2nd New Zealand Parliament. When Edward Stafford formed a government on 2 June 1856, Richmond accepted an invitation to become Colonial Secretary (forerunner to the modern Minister of Internal Affairs). When Henry Sewell resigned, Richmond also became Colonial Treasurer (forerunner to the modern Minister of Finance), although Sewell briefly resumed this post for two months in 1859. On 27 August 1858, he became New Zealand's first Minister for Native Affairs, but lost this post to Frederick Weld in late 1860. He also served as Commissioner of Customs.

Politically, Richmond aligned himself with the centralist faction, believing that the power of the provinces needed to be curtailed. Richmond also believed in the need to "reform" Māori institutions and culture, being particularly adamant about the need to eliminate the beastly communism of common land ownership. Richmond generally had a very low opinion of Māori, considering them to be savages.

He was confirmed at the 1860 general election, which was held on 28 November. After the Stafford government fell, Richmond did not remain in Parliament for long, and he resigned on 20 January 1862. He was succeeded by Isaac Newton Watt.

== Legal career ==
He established a law practice in Dunedin with Thomas Gillies, a fellow MP. He was soon appointed to a post as a senior judge, a role which he seemed to enjoy more than his former political career. In 1865, he turned down an invitation by Stafford to return to politics, despite a suggestion that he could become Premier.

During the "Barton Affair" of 1876–78 he was a member of the court with Chief Justice James Prendergast who imprisoned lawyer George Elliott Barton for a month for contempt of court, a ruling that split the Wellington legal profession.

Towards the end of his life, Richmond became increasingly conservative, condemning the Liberal Party's proposals for women's suffrage, a land tax, and an income tax.

== Family and death ==
The Richmonds had five daughters and four sons. Their daughter Margaret married the surgeon Walter Fell in 1886. Richmond died in Wellington on 3 August 1895.

New Zealand Parliament
Preceded by Francis Gledhill	Member of Parliament for Town of New Plymouth; 1855–1862	Succeeded by Isaac Newton Watt
Government offices
Preceded by John Hall	Colonial Secretary of New Zealand; 1856	Succeeded by Edward Stafford
Preceded by Henry Sewell	Colonial Treasurer; 1856–1859; 1859–1861	Succeeded by Henry Sewell
Preceded by Henry Sewell	Colonial Treasurer; 1856–1859; 1859–1861	Succeeded by Reader Wood
New office	Minister of Native Affairs; 1858–1860	Succeeded by Frederick Weld
