= 1868 Omata by-election =

New Zealand by-election

The 1868 Omata by-election was a by-election held on 7 February in the Omata electorate in Taranaki during the 4th New Zealand Parliament.

The by-election was caused by the resignation of the incumbent, Arthur Atkinson in 1867.

He was replaced by Charles Brown.

Brown was the only nomination, so was declared elected unopposed.
