= 1865 Omata by-election =

New Zealand by-election

The 1865 Omata by-election was a by-election held on 18 July in the Omata electorate in Taranaki during the 3rd New Zealand Parliament.

The by-election was caused by the resignation of the incumbent, James Crowe Richmond, who had been appointed to the Legislative Council.

He was replaced by Francis Gledhill. Atkinson won on the show of hands, but Gledhill's supporters requested a poll which was held on the next day. Then Gledhill won by one vote, although apparently two Atkinson supporters from Waitara arrived three or four minutes late after the polling station had closed and had to "reserve their vote".

== Results ==
The following table gives the election result:

1865 Omata by-election
Party	Candidate	Votes	%	±%
Independent	Francis Gledhill	33	50.77	
Independent	Arthur Atkinson	32	49.23	
Majority		1	1.54	
Turnout		65		
