= 1870 Omata by-election =

New Zealand by-election

The 1870 Omata by-election was a by-election held on 27 April in the Omata electorate during the 4th New Zealand Parliament.

The by-election was caused by the resignation of the incumbent, Charles Brown.

He was replaced by Frederic Carrington.

== Result ==
The following table gives the election result:

1870 Omata by-election
Party	Candidate	Votes	%	±%
Independent	Frederic Carrington	42	54.55	
Independent	Captain E. Carthew	35	45.45	
Majority		7	9.09	
Turnout		77		
