= Alfred William East =

New Zealand politician

New Zealand Parliament
Years	Term	Electorate	Party
1855–1860	2nd	Omata	Independent

Alfred William East was a New Zealand politician. He represented the Omata electorate on the Taranaki Provincial Council from 5 November 1855 to 13 December 1856. He represented the Omata electorate in the 2nd New Zealand Parliament from 1855, but resigned in March 1860 at the outbreak of the First Taranaki War before the end of his term when he accepted a government appointment. He left Taranaki at that time. He did not serve in any subsequent Parliaments. In the resulting by-election, James Crowe Richmond was returned unopposed.

He was later a captain with the 4th Waikato Regiment in Hamilton, New Zealand. He was one of the original owners of Claudelands, now one of the city's suburbs. East Street in Claudelands is named for him. In 1870, he was appointed postmaster in charge of the mail service between New Zealand, Australia, and San Francisco.

== Notes ==
New Zealand Parliament
Preceded by William Crompton	Member of Parliament for Omata; 1855–1860	Succeeded by James Crowe Richmond
