= Omata (electorate) =

Omata was a New Zealand electorate. It was located in Taranaki and based on the township of Omata. One of the original 24 electorates, it existed from 1853 to 1870.

== Population centres ==
The Omata electorate was named after Omata in Taranaki, a locality just south-west of New Plymouth. The electorate's boundary was a straight line that started at the coast between Omata and New Plymouth, and it proceeded in a south-east direction to near where Pātea is located. Population centres located in the electorate included Ōpunake, Manaia, Hāwera, and Eltham. In the 1870 electoral redistribution, the Omata electorate was abolished. The electorate's area was effectively increased towards the east (the easternmost boundary reached the Whanganui River), gaining a large area from the Grey and Bell electorate, and the name changed to Egmont after Mount Egmont, the original European name of Mount Taranaki.

== History ==
The Omata electorate was one of the twenty-four original electorates, used in New Zealand's first general election. In 1853, William Crompton was returned elected unopposed. In the 1855 election, Alfred William East beat the incumbent by a six-vote margin. East resigned in March 1860 before the end of his term when he accepted a government appointment. In the resulting by-election on 16 April 1860, James Crowe Richmond was returned unopposed.

=== Members of Parliament ===
The following Members of Parliament represented the Omata electorate:

Election	Winner
1853 election	William Crompton
1855 election	Alfred William East
1860 by-election	James Crowe Richmond
1860 election	James Crowe Richmond
1865 by-election	Francis Gledhill
1866 election	Arthur Atkinson
1868 by-election	Charles Brown
1870 by-election	Frederic Carrington

== Election results ==
=== 1853 election ===
William Crompton was returned unopposed.

=== 1855 election ===
1855 general election: Omata
Party	Candidate	Votes	%	±%
Independent	Alfred William East	?		
Independent	William Crompton	?		
Majority		6		
Registered electors		105		

=== 1860 by-election ===
James Crowe Richmond was returned unopposed.

=== 1868 by-election ===
Charles Brown was returned unopposed (see 1868 by-election).

=== 1870 by-election ===
1870 Omata by-election
Party	Candidate	Votes	%	±%
Independent	Frederic Carrington	42	54.55	
Independent	Captain E. Carthew	35	45.45	
Majority		7	9.09	
Turnout		77		
