= Charles Whitcombe =

Charles Whitcombe may refer to:

- Charles Douglas Whitcombe (1835–1904), New Zealand public official and diplomat
- Charles Arthur Ford Whitcombe (1872–1930), English architect; immigrated to Australia in 1916
- Charles Whitcombe (golfer) (1895–1978), English professional golfer
