= Hurworth, New Zealand =

Hurworth
- Interactive map of Hurworth
- Coordinates: 39°7′49.18″S 174°4′13.08″E
- Country: New Zealand
- Region: Taranaki
- District: New Plymouth District
- Ward: Kaitake-Ngāmotu General Ward; Kōhanga Moa General Ward; Te Purutanga Mauri Pūmanawa Māori Ward
- Community: Kaitake Community; Inglewood Community
- Electorates: New Plymouth; Te Tai Hauāuru (Māori)

Government
  - Territorial Authority: New Plymouth District Council
  - Regional council: Taranaki Regional Council
  - Mayor of New Plymouth: Max Brough
  - New Plymouth MP: David MacLeod
  - Te Tai Hauāuru MP: Debbie Ngarewa-Packer

Area
  - Total: 20.76 km^{2} (8.02 sq mi)

Population (2023 Census)
  - Total: 561
  - Density: 27.0/km^{2} (70.0/sq mi)

Hurworth is a locality in Taranaki, New Zealand. It is 8 kilometres (5.0 mi) south of the city of New Plymouth. The settlement was established in the 1850s.

== History ==
Harry Atkinson, the Premier of New Zealand, named Hurworth after a village he had lived in as a child in England. Atkinson contributed to the establishment of the settlement; he built what is now known as "Hurworth Cottage", from what a sawyer had taught him.

Hurworth became one of six thriving settlements, known for its fine cheeses. Other residents included the Ronalds family – five brothers and sisters of Dr Edmund Ronalds. However, many buildings were damaged in the First Taranaki War of 1860. The town was abandoned and residents were forced to move to nearby New Plymouth. Hurworth Cottage was the only building standing in the area after the war in 1861, but its floor had been set afire.

Atkinson did not return to the settlement until 1865. The area afterwards grew into another small community, and in 1967, the cottage was given to the New Zealand Historic Places Trust by its then-owner, Robert Brown. It has since been preserved.

== Demographics ==
Hurworth locality covers 20.76 km^{2} (8.02 sq mi). The locality is part of the Mangorei statistical area.

Historical population
| Year | Pop. | ±% p.a. |
|---|---|---|
| 2006 | 288 | — |
| 2013 | 450 | +6.58% |
| 2018 | 504 | +2.29% |
| 2023 | 561 | +2.17% |

Hurworth had a population of 561 in the 2023 New Zealand census, an increase of 57 people (11.3%) since the 2018 census, and an increase of 111 people (24.7%) since the 2013 census. There were 291 males, 264 females, and 3 people of other genders in 207 dwellings. 2.1% of people identified as LGBTIQ+. There were 102 people (18.2%) aged under 15 years, 69 (12.3%) aged 15 to 29, 294 (52.4%) aged 30 to 64, and 90 (16.0%) aged 65 or older.

People could identify as more than one ethnicity. The results were 94.7% European (Pākehā); 11.2% Māori; 2.7% Asian; 0.5% Middle Eastern, Latin American and African New Zealanders (MELAA); and 2.7% other, which includes people giving their ethnicity as "New Zealander". English was spoken by 98.4%, Māori by 1.6%, and other languages by 7.0%. No language could be spoken by 1.1% (e.g. too young to talk). New Zealand Sign Language was known by 0.5%. The percentage of people born overseas was 12.8, compared with 28.8% nationally.

Religious affiliations were 31.0% Christian, 0.5% Islam, 1.1% New Age, and 0.5% other religions. People who answered that they had no religion were 56.1%, and 10.7% of people did not answer the census question.

Of those at least 15 years old, 102 (22.2%) people had a bachelor's or higher degree, 249 (54.2%) had a post-high school certificate or diploma, and 105 (22.9%) people exclusively held high school qualifications. 87 people (19.0%) earned over $100,000 compared to 12.1% nationally. The employment status of those at least 15 was 240 (52.3%) full-time, 78 (17.0%) part-time, and 9 (2.0%) unemployed.

== Attractions ==
The Pouakai Zoo is located in Hurworth and includes lions, meerkats, tammar wallabies, black-handed spider monkeys and a female lar gibbon.
