= Manuherikia (electorate) =

Manuherikia was a parliamentary electorate in the Otago region of New Zealand. It existed from 1866 to 1870 and was represented by two Members of Parliament.

== Population centres ==
The electorate included the towns of Alexandra, Cromwell, Ranfurly and Roxburgh.

== History ==
The electorate was formed for the 1866 election. It existed for one term only, i.e. until the end of the 4th New Zealand Parliament in 1870.

== Members ==
The electorate was represented by two Members of Parliament:

Key

Independent

Election	Winner
1866 election	William Baldwin
1867 by-election	David Mervyn

== Election results ==
=== 1867 Manuherikia by-election ===
1867 Manuherikia by-election
Party	Candidate	Votes	%	±%
Independent	David Mervyn	51	73.91	
Independent	John Jack	18	26.09	
Turnout		69		
Majority		33	47.83	
