= 1867 Manuherikia by-election =

New Zealand by-election

The 1867 Manuherikia by-election was a by-election held on 29 November 1864 in the Manuherikia electorate during the 4th New Zealand Parliament.

The by-election was caused by the resignation of the incumbent MP William Baldwin on 15 February 1867.

The by-election was contested by David Mervyn and John Jack. When Jack won the "show of hands" at the nomination meeting, the by-election was demanded and won by Mervyn.

== Results ==
1867 Manuherikia by-election
Party	Candidate	Votes	%	±%
Independent	David Mervyn	51	73.91	
Independent	John Jack	18	26.09	
Turnout		69		
Majority		33	47.83	
