= David Mervyn =

New Zealand politician

New Zealand Parliament
Years	Term	Electorate	Party
1867–1870	4th	Manuherikia	Independent
1871–1875	5th	Mount Ida	Independent

David Hunter Mervyn was a 19th-century Member of Parliament in the Otago region of New Zealand.

He represented the Manuherikia electorate from 1867 to 1870 through winning the by-election on 15 May, and then the Mount Ida electorate from 1871 (having won the 17 February general election) to 1875, when he retired.

In 1871 he was censured after an incident in Parliament, during which Wi Parata offered to remove him by force.

In 1884 while at Roxburgh he was sued by his housekeeper (Kate Mann) for unpaid wages and for breach of promise of marriage. The "breach of promise" case was later withdrawn.

He was referred to in 1891 as the late Mr D. H. Mervyn.

New Zealand Parliament
New constituency	Member of Parliament for Mount Ida; 1871–1875	Succeeded by Cecil de Lautour
