= 1868 Rangitikei by-election =

New Zealand by-election

The 1868 Rangitikei by-election was a by-election held on 22 June 1868 in the Rangitikei electorate during the 4th New Zealand Parliament.

The by-election was caused by the resignation of the incumbent MP William Hogg Watt on 15 June 1868.

The by-election was won by William Fox. As no other candidates were nominated, he was declared duly elected.
