= Omata =

Settlement in Taranaki Region, New Zealand

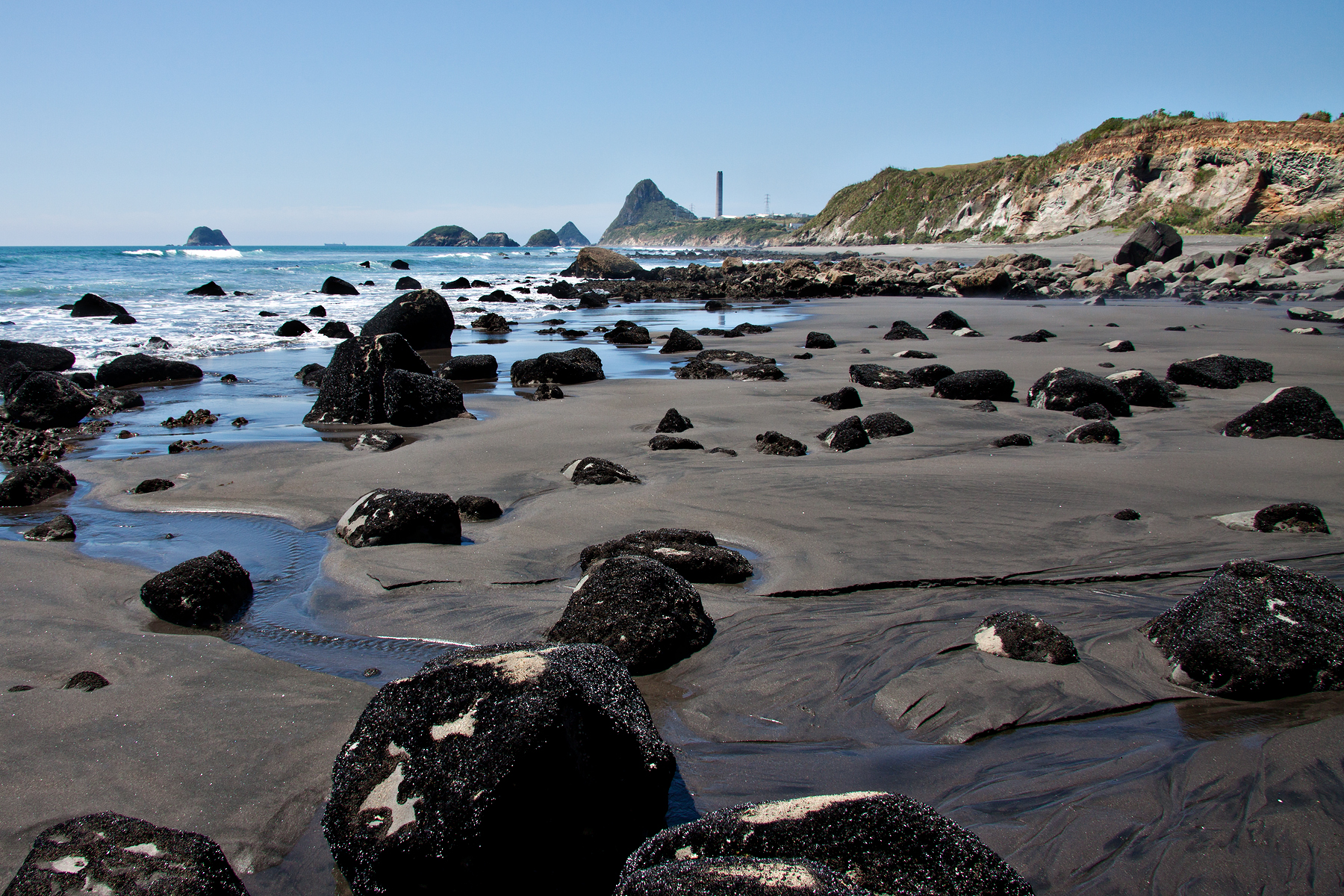
- Tapuae Beach
- Interactive map of Omata
- Coordinates: 39°5′38″S 174°1′13″E
- Country: New Zealand
- Region: Taranaki Region
- Territorial authority: New Plymouth District
- Ward: Kaitake-Ngāmotu General Ward; Te Purutanga Mauri Pūmanawa Māori Ward
- Community: Kaitake Community
- Electorates: New Plymouth; Te Tai Hauāuru (Māori)

Government
  - Territorial Authority: New Plymouth District Council
  - Regional council: Taranaki Regional Council
  - Mayor of New Plymouth: Max Brough
  - New Plymouth MP: David MacLeod
  - Te Tai Hauāuru MP: Debbie Ngarewa-Packer

Area
  - Total: 16.25 km^{2} (6.27 sq mi)

Population (June 2025)
  - Total: 570
  - Density: 35/km^{2} (91/sq mi)

Omata is a locality in Taranaki, in the western North Island of New Zealand. It is located on State Highway 45 just southwest of New Plymouth. Omata and Western New Plymouth are adjacent to the Tapuae Marine Reserve.

The area was the site of the Omata Stockade, built to house soldiers during tensions at the time of the First Taranaki War in 1860–61, and is near the site of the Battle of Waireka on 28 March 1860. The stockade, designed and constructed by local settlers, was built on the site of Ngāturi Pā. In August 1860, most of Omata village was burnt down during the war. Troops were stationed at the stockade until 1866, and it was demolished by farmers and the remains auctioned off in late 1867.

== Demographics ==
Omata statistical area covers 16.25 km^{2} (6.27 sq mi) and had an estimated population of 570 as of June 2025, with a population density of 35 people per km^{2}.

Historical population
Year	Pop.	±% p.a.
2006	771	—
2013	402	−8.88%
2018	465	+2.95%
2023	555	+3.60%
The 2006 population is for a larger area of 21.60 km^{2}. Source:

Omata had a population of 555 in the 2023 New Zealand census, an increase of 90 people (19.4%) since the 2018 census, and an increase of 153 people (38.1%) since the 2013 census. There were 279 males and 276 females in 201 dwellings. 2.2% of people identified as LGBTIQ+. The median age was 45.0 years (compared with 38.1 years nationally). There were 111 people (20.0%) aged under 15 years, 78 (14.1%) aged 15 to 29, 249 (44.9%) aged 30 to 64, and 114 (20.5%) aged 65 or older.

People could identify as more than one ethnicity. The results were 93.0% European (Pākehā); 13.0% Māori; 1.6% Pasifika; 3.2% Asian; 0.5% Middle Eastern, Latin American and African New Zealanders (MELAA); and 1.6% other, which includes people giving their ethnicity as "New Zealander". English was spoken by 96.8%, Māori by 2.7%, Samoan by 0.5%, and other languages by 7.0%. No language could be spoken by 1.6% (e.g. too young to talk). The percentage of people born overseas was 16.2, compared with 28.8% nationally.

Religious affiliations were 31.4% Christian, 0.5% Hindu, 0.5% Buddhist, and 0.5% other religions. People who answered that they had no religion were 56.2%, and 9.7% of people did not answer the census question.

Of those at least 15 years old, 105 (23.6%) people had a bachelor's or higher degree, 258 (58.1%) had a post-high school certificate or diploma, and 87 (19.6%) people exclusively held high school qualifications. The median income was $43,600, compared with $41,500 nationally. 69 people (15.5%) earned over $100,000 compared to 12.1% nationally. The employment status of those at least 15 was 210 (47.3%) full-time, 96 (21.6%) part-time, and 6 (1.4%) unemployed.

== Education ==
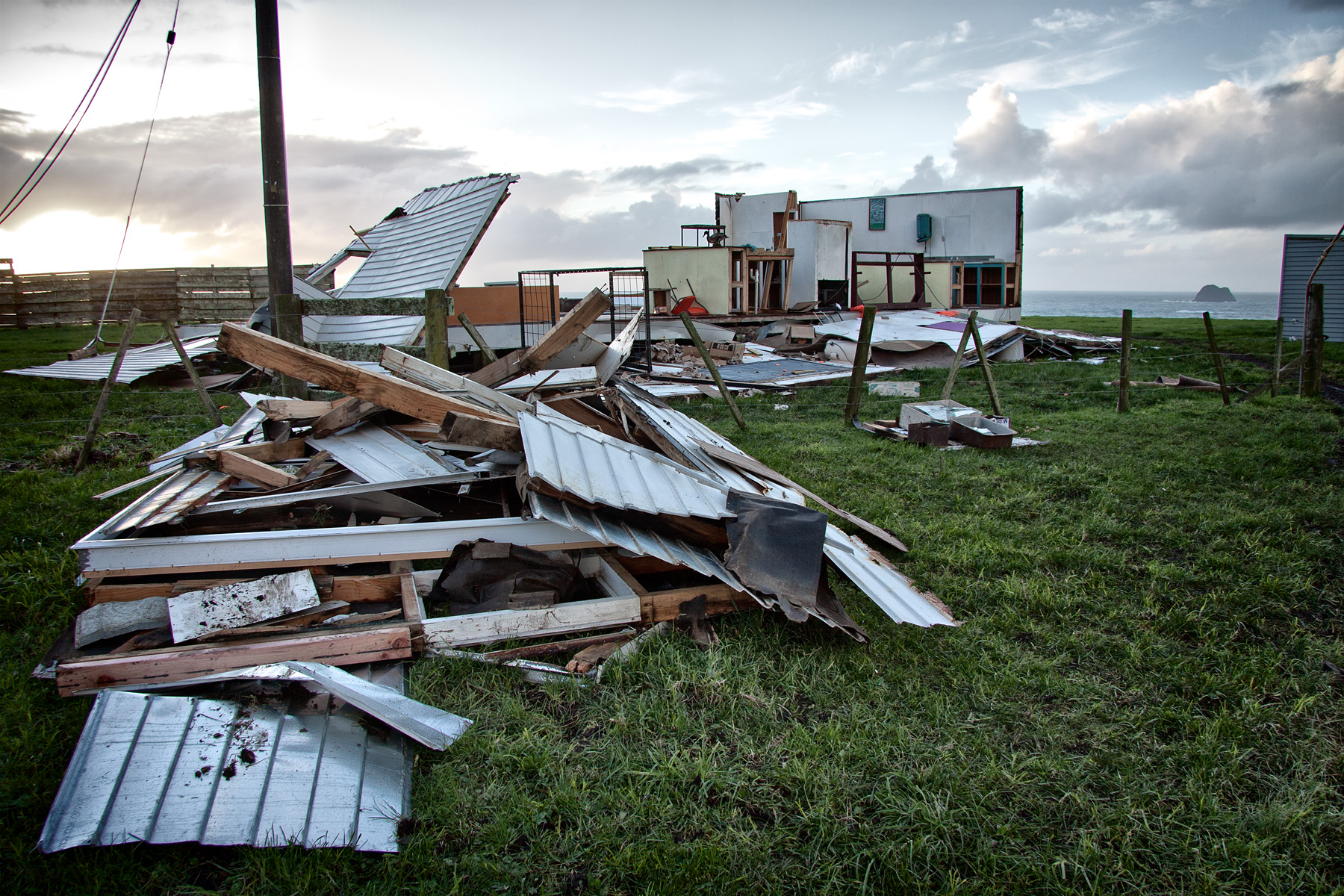
Clubrooms of the New Plymouth Clay Target Club near Omata destroyed by a tornado

Ōmata School is a coeducational full primary (years 1–8) school with a roll of 205 students as of July 2026. It opened in 1853.

== Omata electorate ==
Omata was an electorate for the New Zealand House of Representatives from 1853 to 1870. Seven Members of Parliament represented the electorate in the 1st to 4th Parliament.
