= 1861 Grey and Bell by-election =

New Zealand by-election

The 1861 Grey and Bell by-election was a by-election held on 20 June during the 3rd New Zealand Parliament in the Taranaki electorate of Grey and Bell.

The by-election was caused by the death of the incumbent MP William Cutfield King on 8 February 1861.

The by-election was won by Harry Atkinson.

Atkinson was unopposed, and was duly declared elected.
