= 1870 Bruce by-election =

New Zealand by-election

The 1870 Bruce by-election was held on 21 March 1870 in the Bruce electorate after the resignation of John Cargill during the 4th Parliament.

He was replaced by James Clark Brown.

Brown was nominated by John Lillie Gillies and seconded by Henry Clark; 25 electors were present. As there was only one nomination, he was declared elected unopposed.

Brown was described as an "Anti-Ministerialist".
