= Taranaki Waste Lands Board =

Body that managed the sale of confiscated Māori land

The Taranaki Waste Lands Board was constituted under the Taranaki Waste Lands Act 1874 to manage the sale of confiscated Māori land.

Blocks administered by the Waste Lands Board included the Moa, Waitara-Taramouku, Kopua, Pukemahoe, Onaero-Urenui-Taramoukou-Ruapekapeka, Waipuku, Waipuku-Patea, Manganui-Te Wera, Huiroa, Otoia, Ahuroa-Ratapiko-Manawawiri-Mangaotuku, Mangaehu, Kataroa No. 1, and Pukekino blocks, in all about 253,000 acres (1,020 km^{2}).

The Board commenced proceedings in January 1875, chaired by Charles Douglas Whitcombe, Taranaki Commissioner of Crown Lands, with William Morgan Crompton, Thomas Kelly, Arthur Standish, and William Neilson Syme standing as members. It oversaw the establishment of the town of Inglewood on 23 January, in the Moa district, and held its first land sale on 20 February that year. A major sale of 2,000 acres (8.1 km^{2}) was settled with Colonel Robert Trimble later that year, and in 1876 a block of 2,000 acres (8.1 km^{2}) was sold to Messrs. Jones and McMillan.

In 1877, A. Cracroft Fookes was sold 5,000 acres (20 km^{2}) on the Mountain Road for the purpose of forming the Midhirst Special Settlement. The Board authorised the surveying of a new town on the banks of the Patea River on 11 June 1877, and gave it the name Stratford in December that year, when it also authorised the surveying of Waipuku village.
