= Fairfield House, Nelson =

Historic building in Nelson, New Zealand

Coordinates: 41°17′02″S 173°17′00″E

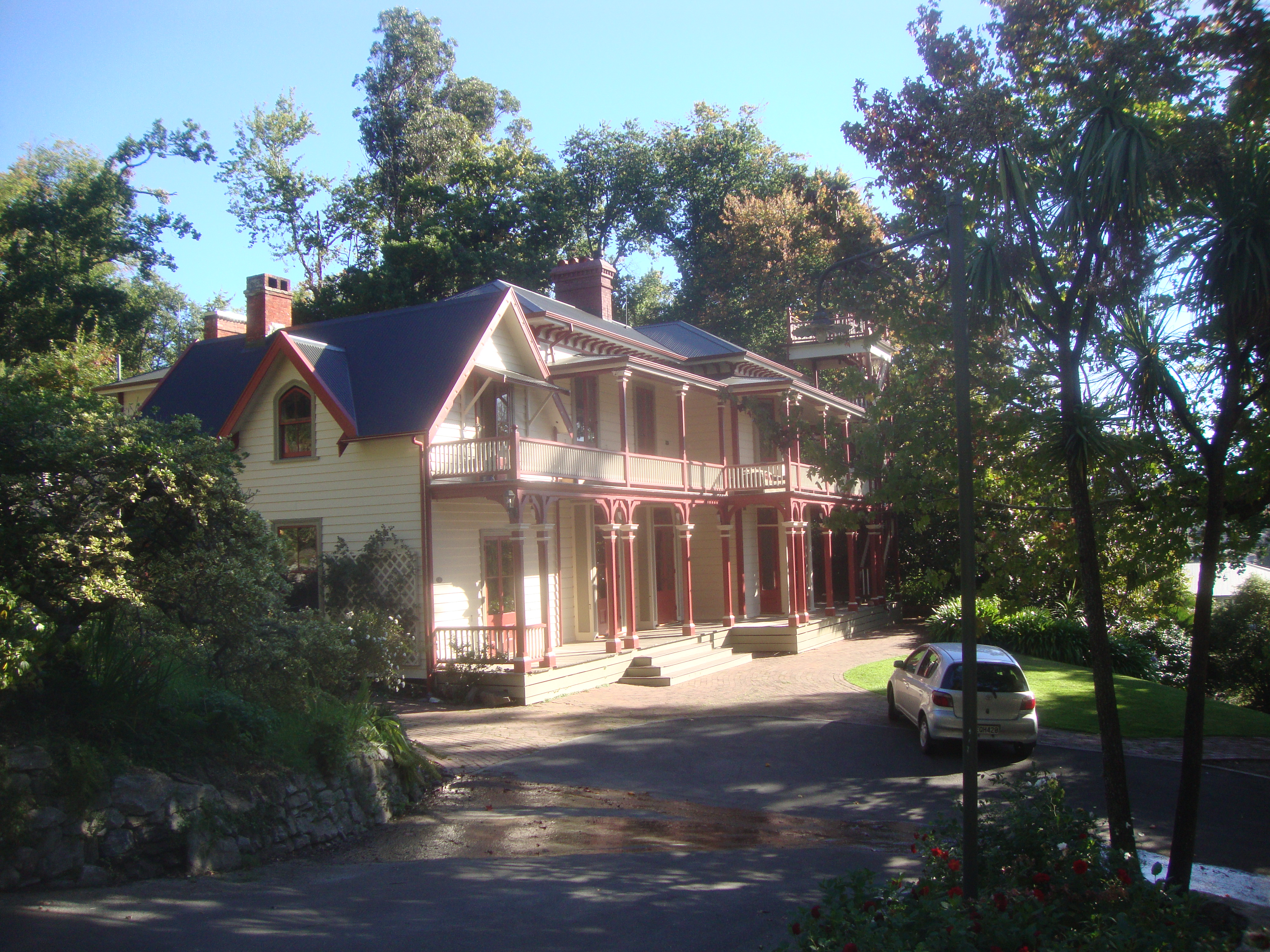
Fairfield House in 2012

Fairfield House in 48 Van Diemen Street, Nelson, New Zealand, is registered with Heritage New Zealand as a Category I structure. Originally built in 1849, today's house was constructed as a residence for Arthur Atkinson in 1872. It was at some stage owned by the Nelson College for Girls, who used it as a boarding house. After the 1929 Murchison earthquake, boarders from Nelson College also moved in, as their hostel got damaged. The house was given to Nelson City Council in 1979 and was threatened with demolition. A community group formed that had the objective of saving the house. Alan Stanton (1945–2014), a local toy-maker, moved into the derelict building as a squatter and started restoring it. Today, it is a community centre.

Atkinson, who was the brother of Premier Harry Atkinson, had an observation tower built onto the house in 1883, as his hobby was astronomy. He was tasked by the Royal Society to observe the transit of Venus in 1882. The tower had at one point been demolished, but a replica has since been built.
