= 1856 Grey and Bell by-election =

New Zealand by-election

The Grey and Bell by-election 1856 was a by-election held in the Grey and Bell electorate during the 2nd New Zealand Parliament, on 14 October 1856, and was, along with the Christchurch Country 1856 by-election, the second equal contested by-election in New Zealand political history.

The by-election was caused by the resignation of incumbent MP Charles Brown and was won by John Lewthwaite. On nomination day (13 October) John Lewthwaite and Mr R. Pheney were nominated, and after a second show of hands in favour of Lewthwaite, Pheney demanded a poll. John Lewthwaite was subsequently elected the following day.

== Results ==
1856 Grey and Bell by-election
Party	Candidate	Votes	%	±%
Independent	John Lewthwaite	44	58.7	
Independent	R. Pheney	31	41.3	
Turnout		75		
Majority		13		
