= 1860 Omata by-election =

New Zealand by-election

The 1860 Omata by-election was a by-election held on 16 April in the Omata electorate in Taranaki during the 2nd New Zealand Parliament.

The by-election was caused by the resignation of the incumbent, Alfred William East.

He was replaced by James Crowe Richmond.

Richmond was the only nomination, so was declared elected unopposed.
