= Francis Gledhill =

New Zealand politician

New Zealand Parliament
Years	Term	Electorate	Party
1853–1855	1st	New Plymouth	Independent
1865–1866	3rd	Omata	Independent

Francis Ullathorne Gledhill (1803 – 2 October 1882) was a New Zealand politician.

He was born in 1803 in Halifax, Yorkshire, England, and came to New Zealand in 1844, settling in New Plymouth and opening a shop and the first tanning works in the area. He served in the first and third Parliaments, representing New Plymouth in the former and Omata in the latter. Between his two terms in office, he was a volunteer in the First Taranaki War.

He died in New Plymouth on 2 October 1882, and was buried at Te Henui Cemetery.

New Zealand Parliament
New constituency	Member of Parliament for Town of New Plymouth; 1853–1855	Succeeded by William Richmond
Preceded by James Crowe Richmond	Member of Parliament for Omata; 1865–1866	Succeeded by Arthur Atkinson
