= Mangorei =

Rural community in Taranaki, New Zealand

- Rural community
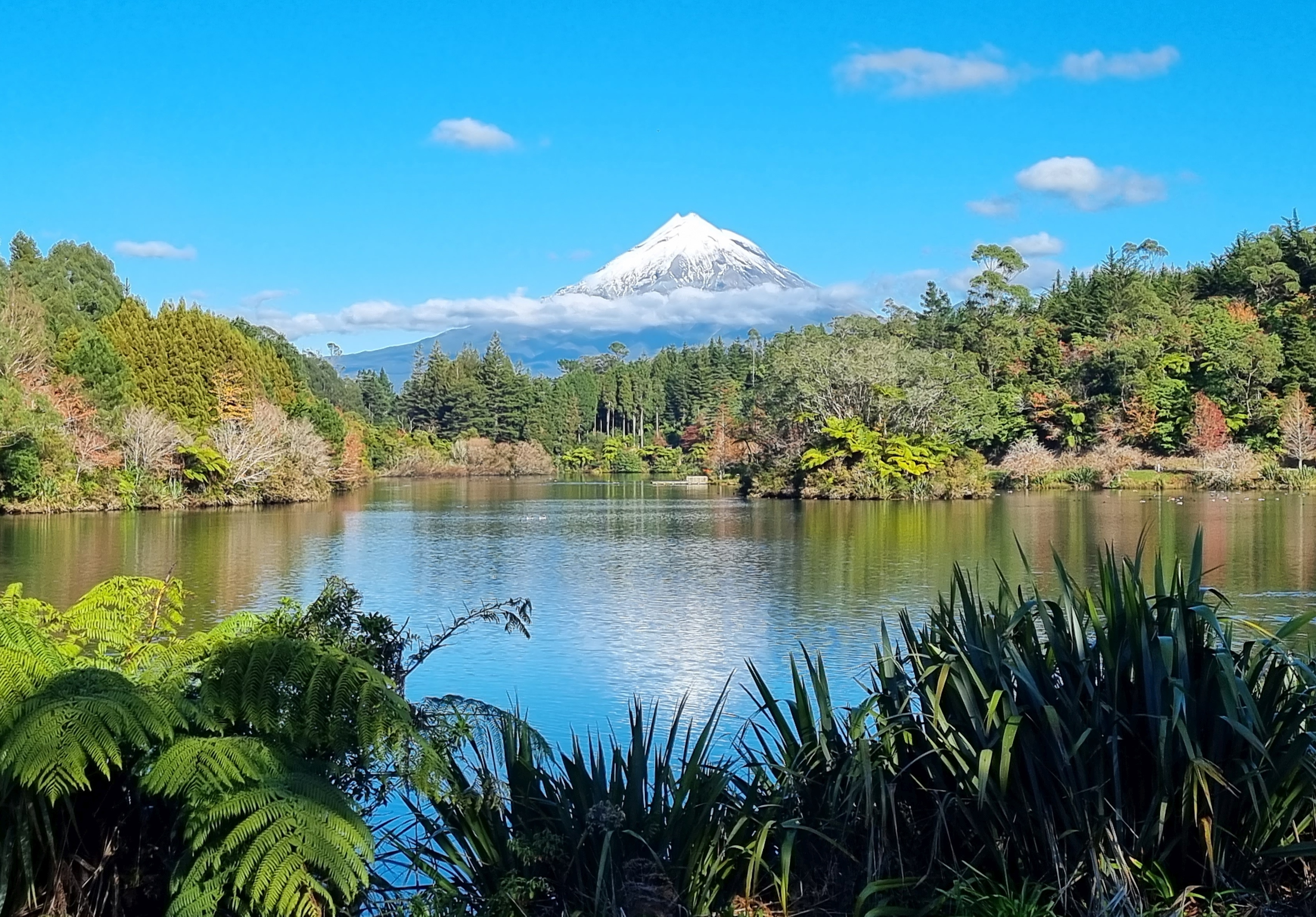
- Lake Mangamahoe
- Interactive map of Mangorei
- Coordinates: 39.128°S 174.090°E
- Country: New Zealand
- Region: Taranaki Region
- Territorial authority: New Plymouth District
- Ward: Kōhanga Moa General Ward; Te Purutanga Mauri Pūmanawa Māori Ward
- Community: Inglewood Community
- Electorates: New Plymouth; Te Tai Hauāuru (Māori)

Government
  - Territorial Authority: New Plymouth District Council
  - Regional council: Taranaki Regional Council
  - Mayor of New Plymouth: Max Brough
  - New Plymouth MP: David MacLeod
  - Te Tai Hauāuru MP: Debbie Ngarewa-Packer

Area
  - Total: 23.08 km^{2} (8.91 sq mi)

Population (2023 Census)
  - Total: 399
  - Density: 17.3/km^{2} (44.8/sq mi)

Mangorei is a locality on the outskirts of New Plymouth in Taranaki, New Zealand. The city centre is about 5 km (3.1 mi) to the north-west. State Highway 3 passes to the south-west.

Lake Mangamahoe is a lake on the eastern side of State Highway 3.

== Demographics ==
Mangorei locality covers 23.08 km^{2} (8.91 sq mi). The locality is part of the Mangorei statistical area.

Historical population for the locality
Year	Pop.	±% p.a.
2006	237	—
2013	279	+2.36%
2018	366	+5.58%
2023	399	+1.74%

Mangorei locality had a population of 399 in the 2023 New Zealand census, an increase of 33 people (9.0%) since the 2018 census, and an increase of 120 people (43.0%) since the 2013 census. There were 213 males and 186 females in 141 dwellings. 1.5% of people identified as LGBTIQ+. There were 81 people (20.3%) aged under 15 years, 57 (14.3%) aged 15 to 29, 219 (54.9%) aged 30 to 64, and 42 (10.5%) aged 65 or older.

People could identify as more than one ethnicity. The results were 95.5% European (Pākehā), 8.3% Māori, 1.5% Pasifika, 2.3% Asian, and 1.5% other, which includes people giving their ethnicity as "New Zealander". English was spoken by 98.5%, Māori by 1.5%, and other languages by 8.3%. No language could be spoken by 1.5% (e.g. too young to talk). New Zealand Sign Language was known by 0.8%. The percentage of people born overseas was 18.0, compared with 28.8% nationally.

Religious affiliations were 30.1% Christian, 0.8% Māori religious beliefs, and 2.3% other religions. People who answered that they had no religion were 59.4%, and 8.3% of people did not answer the census question.

Of those at least 15 years old, 72 (22.6%) people had a bachelor's or higher degree, 192 (60.4%) had a post-high school certificate or diploma, and 51 (16.0%) people exclusively held high school qualifications. 57 people (17.9%) earned over $100,000 compared to 12.1% nationally. The employment status of those at least 15 was 156 (49.1%) full-time, 72 (22.6%) part-time, and 9 (2.8%) unemployed.

=== Mangorei statistical area ===
Mangorei statistical area, which also includes Hurworth, covers 188.56 km^{2} (72.80 sq mi) and had an estimated population of 2,250 as of June 2025, with a population density of 12 people per km^{2}.

Historical population for the statistical area
Year	Pop.	±% p.a.
2006	1,269	—
2013	1,683	+4.12%
2018	1,998	+3.49%
2023	2,208	+2.02%

Mangorei had a population of 2,208 in the 2023 New Zealand census, an increase of 210 people (10.5%) since the 2018 census, and an increase of 525 people (31.2%) since the 2013 census. There were 1,149 males, 1,050 females, and 9 people of other genders in 774 dwellings. 2.4% of people identified as LGBTIQ+. The median age was 42.9 years (compared with 38.1 years nationally). There were 501 people (22.7%) aged under 15 years, 279 (12.6%) aged 15 to 29, 1,149 (52.0%) aged 30 to 64, and 279 (12.6%) aged 65 or older.

People could identify as more than one ethnicity. The results were 95.0% European (Pākehā); 10.3% Māori; 0.7% Pasifika; 2.7% Asian; 0.3% Middle Eastern, Latin American and African New Zealanders (MELAA); and 2.6% other, which includes people giving their ethnicity as "New Zealander". English was spoken by 98.0%, Māori by 1.6%, and other languages by 6.4%. No language could be spoken by 1.8% (e.g. too young to talk). New Zealand Sign Language was known by 0.5%. The percentage of people born overseas was 15.9, compared with 28.8% nationally.

Religious affiliations were 28.3% Christian, 0.1% Hindu, 0.1% Islam, 0.1% Māori religious beliefs, 0.4% Buddhist, 0.3% New Age, 0.1% Jewish, and 0.8% other religions. People who answered that they had no religion were 61.7%, and 8.2% of people did not answer the census question.

Of those at least 15 years old, 432 (25.3%) people had a bachelor's or higher degree, 951 (55.7%) had a post-high school certificate or diploma, and 333 (19.5%) people exclusively held high school qualifications. The median income was $46,400, compared with $41,500 nationally. 300 people (17.6%) earned over $100,000 compared to 12.1% nationally. The employment status of those at least 15 was 888 (52.0%) full-time, 357 (20.9%) part-time, and 42 (2.5%) unemployed.

== Education ==
Mangorei School is a coeducational full primary (years 1–8) school with a roll of 283 students as of July 2026. The school started as Lower Mangorei School in 1926, with a previous Lower Mangorei School and Kent School consolidating onto the present site. Upper Mangorei School was closed in 1938 and Korito School was closed in 1939, with students from those schools increasing Mangorei School's roll.
