= Charles Douglas Whitcombe =

Charles Douglas Whitcombe (1835 - January 4, 1904) was Taranaki Commissioner of Crown Lands, Secretary of the Provincial Council of Taranaki, and chairman of the Taranaki Waste Lands Board. He also served as Secretary to Sir George Grey in Auckland during the 1880s, and as foreign adviser to the Tongan Government.
