= Thomas Kelly (New Zealand politician) =

New Zealand politician

New Zealand Parliament
Years	Term	Electorate	Party
1869–1870	4th	Town of New Plymouth	Independent
1871–1875	5th	Town of New Plymouth	Independent
1875–1879	6th	Town of New Plymouth	Independent
1879–1881	7th	New Plymouth	Independent
1881–1884	8th	New Plymouth	Independent

Thomas Kelly (1830 – 20 September 1921) was a 19th-century Member of Parliament in Taranaki, New Zealand.

He represented the Town of New Plymouth electorate from 1869 to 1879, and then the (renamed) New Plymouth electorate from 1879 to 1884, when he was defeated.

He then became a member of the Legislative Council from 1892 to 1913.

In 1893 Kelly, a new councillor was at the centre of a drama that led to the passing of the Women's suffrage bill into law. Premier Seddon had expected to stop the bill in the upper house, but found that one more vote was needed. Kelly had left himself paired in favour of the measure, but Seddon obtained his consent by wire to change his vote. Seddon's manipulation so incensed two opposition councillors William Reynolds and Edward Cephas John Stevens that they changed sides and voted for the bill, allowing it to pass by 20 votes to 18 and so gave the vote to women.

Kelly died at his home in Bell Block on 20 September 1921, and was buried at Te Henui Cemetery.

New Zealand Parliament
Preceded by Harry Atkinson	Member of Parliament for Town of New Plymouth; 1869–1879	Constituency renamed
New title Constituency renamed	Member of Parliament for New Plymouth; 1879–1884	Succeeded by Oliver Samuel
