= Frederic Carrington =

New Zealand politician and surveyor

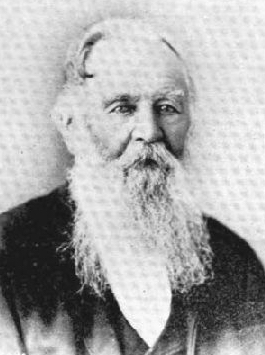
- Born: 11 October 1807; Chelmsford, Essex, England
- Died: 15 July 1901 (aged 93); New Plymouth, New Zealand
- Known for: Founding survey of New Plymouth

Frederic Alonzo Carrington (11 October 1807 – 15 July 1901) was a 19th-century New Zealand politician and surveyor. He is regarded as the Father of New Plymouth.

Carrington was born in Chelmsford, Essex, England, in 1807, the son of Captain William Carrington.

He was 15 years in the Ordnance Survey Department. Then he was appointed by the New Zealand Company as Chief Surveyor to the Plymouth Company and surveyed the new settlement of New Plymouth. He arrived in Wellington with his family in the ship London in December 1840 as a cabin passenger.

In 1844, he returned to England, and undertook surveying for parliamentary committees in England and Scotland. In 1851, he displayed iron made from Taranaki iron sand at The Great Exhibition, London. From 1851 to 1856 he investigated business proposals in California and other parts of America, Paris and Belgium.

He left for New Zealand with his family in January 1857 and in 1862 was made Government Engineering Surveyor for Taranaki. He finally obtained a grant of land in 1877.

New Zealand Parliament
Years	Term	Electorate	Party
1870	4th	Omata	Independent
1871–1875	5th	Grey and Bell	Independent
1875–1879	6th	Grey and Bell	Independent

He was Superintendent of Taranaki Province from 1869 to 1876 (when the Provinces were abolished), and was the member of Parliament for Omata in 1870 and then Grey and Bell from 1871 to 1879 when he retired. He had stood unsuccessfully in the 1869 by-election for Town of New Plymouth

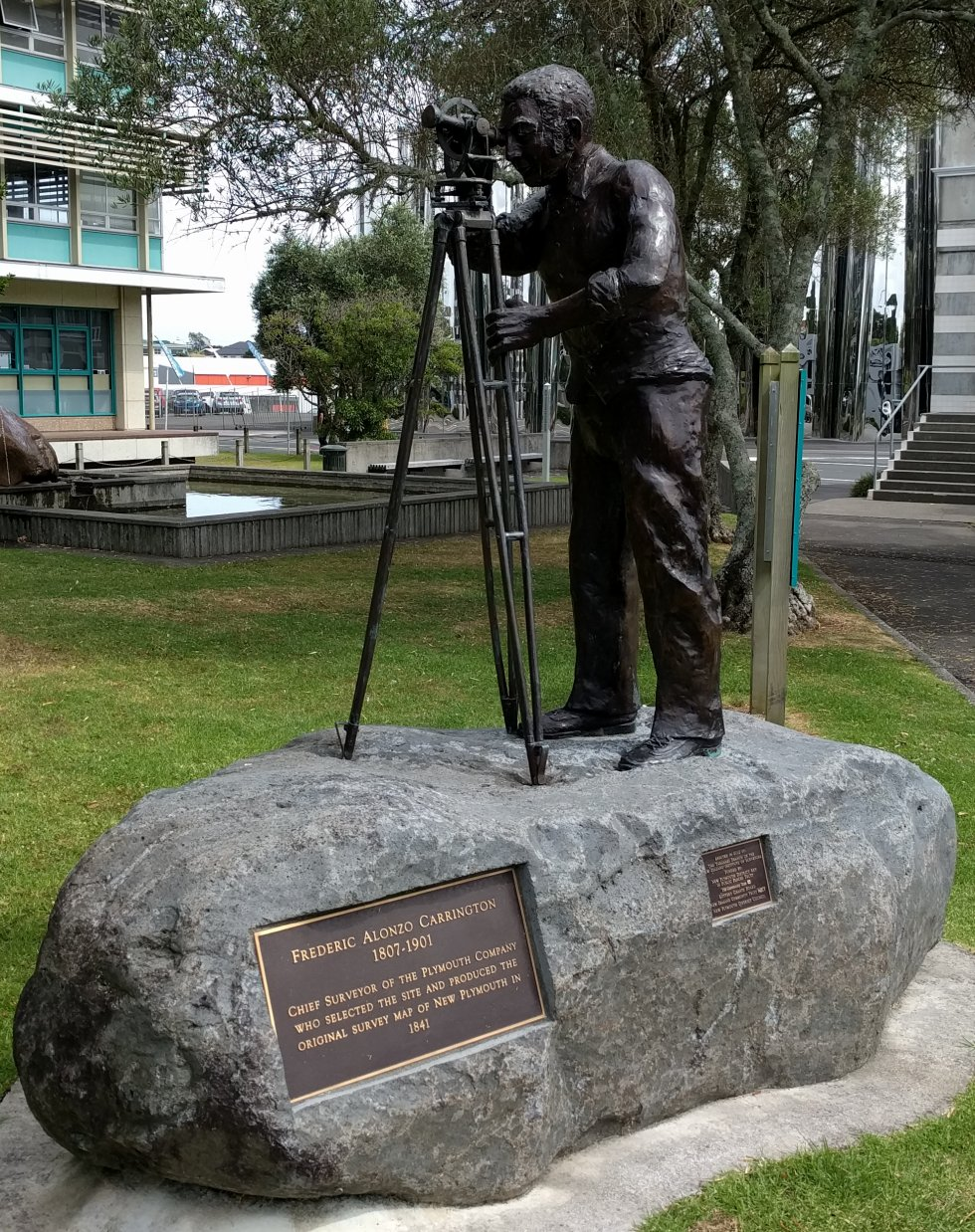
Statue of Carrington at Robe Street Lawn, New Plymouth

He was a member of the Harbour Board (now Port Taranaki), and an advocate of an adequate harbour for New Plymouth. In 1881, Carrington laid the first stone for the main breakwater at the port, using a trowel made from Taranaki ironsand.

Carrington died in New Plymouth and is buried in the family grave in Te Henui Cemetery.

Carrington Street, a New Plymouth arterial route, and its extension Carrington Road, which winds between the Pouakai and Kaitake ranges, are named for him. He is regarded as the father of New Plymouth.

== Notes ==
Political offices
Preceded by Henry Richmond	Superintendent of Taranaki Province; 1869–1877	Provincial Councils abolished
New Zealand Parliament
Preceded by Charles Brown	Member of Parliament for Omata; 1870	Constituency abolished
Preceded by James Crowe Richmond	Member of Parliament for Grey and Bell; 1871–1879	Succeeded by Robert Trimble
