= George Cutfield =

19th century New Zealand politician

George Cutfield (1799 – 22 January 1879) was an early settler in New Zealand. He was active as a politician in Taranaki and was the second Superintendent of Taranaki Province.

Cutfield was born in Deal, Kent, in 1799. At Devonport, Plymouth, he was a naval architect. For the Plymouth Company, a subsidiary of the New Zealand Company, he was in charge of the expedition that left Plymouth on 19 November 1840 on the William Bryan and arrived at what would become New Plymouth on 30 March 1840.

Cutfield member of the New Zealand Legislative Council from 31 December 1853 to 18 March 1854, when he resigned; and 16 February 1858 to 10 April 1867, when he again resigned.

He was the second Superintendent of Taranaki Province from 1857 to 1861.
