= 1867 Town of New Plymouth by-election =

New Zealand by-election

The 1867 Town of New Plymouth by-election was a by-election held on 29 April 1867 in the Town of New Plymouth electorate during the 4th New Zealand Parliament.

The by-election was caused by the resignation of the incumbent, John Richardson on 16 March 1867.

He was replaced by Harry Atkinson.

Atkinson was the only nomination, so was declared elected unopposed.
