= John Lewthwaite =

New Zealand politician (1816–1892)

New Zealand Parliament
Years	Term	Electorate	Party
1856–1858	2nd	Grey and Bell	Independent

John Lewthwaite (1816 – 2 August 1892) was a 19th-century Member of Parliament in the Taranaki Region of New Zealand.

He represented the Grey and Bell electorate from 1856 to 1858, when he resigned.

He died in London on 2 August 1892. He had developed a machine for printing railway tickets and a method of harbour construction

New Zealand Parliament
Preceded by Charles Brown	Member of Parliament for Grey and Bell; 1856–1858	Succeeded by Charles Brown
