= Harry Atkinson =

Premier of New Zealand (1831–1892)

The Honourable Sir Harry Atkinson KCMG
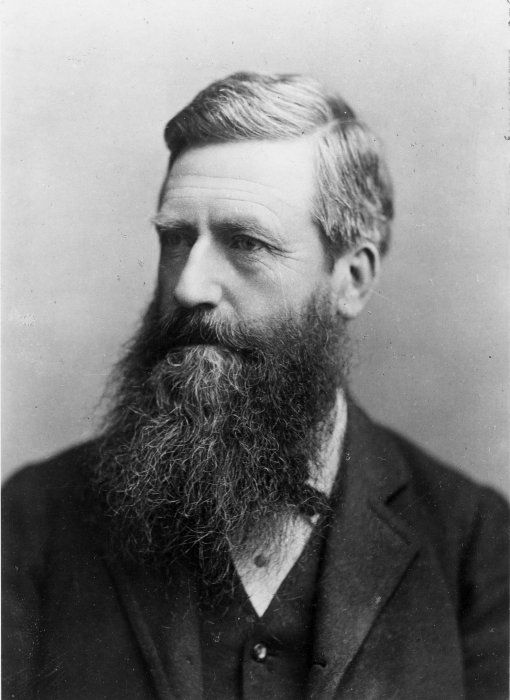
- Atkinson c. 1885

10th Premier of New Zealand
- In office 1 September 1876 – 13 October 1877
- Monarch: Victoria
- Governor: George Phipps; William Jervois; William Onslow
- Preceded by: Julius Vogel
- Succeeded by: Sir George Grey
- In office 25 September 1883 – 16 August 1884
- Preceded by: Frederick Whitaker
- Succeeded by: Robert Stout
- In office 28 August 1884 – 3 September 1884
- Preceded by: Robert Stout
- Succeeded by: Robert Stout
- In office 8 October 1887 – 24 January 1891
- Preceded by: Robert Stout
- Succeeded by: John Ballance

7th Speaker of the Legislative Council
- In office 23 January 1891 – 28 June 1892
- Preceded by: George Waterhouse
- Succeeded by: Henry Miller

Personal details
- Born: Harry Albert Atkinson; 1 November 1831 Broxton, Cheshire, England
- Died: 28 June 1892 (aged 60) Wellington, New Zealand
- Resting place: Karori Cemetery, Wellington, New Zealand
- Party: None
- Spouses: Amelia Jane Skinner (m. 1856; died 1865) Ann Elizabeth Smith (m. 1867)
- Children: 7
- Relatives: Arthur Atkinson (brother); Maria Atkinson (sister-in-law); William Richmond (brother-in-law); Harry Atkinson (grandson); Torchy Atkinson (grandson); Monica Brewster (granddaughter); Arthur Atkinson (nephew); Harry Atkinson (nephew); Mary Richmond (niece)
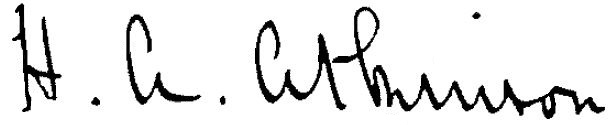
- Signature

Military service
- Allegiance: Colony of New Zealand
- Rank: Major
- Unit: Taranaki Rifle Volunteers

Sir Harry Albert Atkinson KCMG (1 November 1831 – 28 June 1892) served as the tenth premier of New Zealand on four occasions in the late 19th century, and was Colonial Treasurer for a total of ten years. He was responsible for guiding the country during a time of economic depression, and was known as a cautious and prudent manager of government finances, though distrusted for some policies such as his 1882 National Insurance (welfare) scheme and leasehold land schemes. He also participated in the formation of voluntary military units to fight in the New Zealand Wars, and was noted for his strong belief in the need for seizure of Māori land.

== Early life ==
Atkinson, born in 1831 in the English village of Broxton, Cheshire, received his education in England, but chose at the age of 22 to follow his elder brother William to New Zealand. He was accompanied by his brother Arthur together with members of the Richmond family. On arriving in New Zealand, Harry and Arthur bought farmland in Taranaki, as did the Richmonds, and also the Ronalds family – five brothers and sisters of Dr Edmund Ronalds. James and William Richmond also later entered politics and the Ronalds sisters married Atkinson's brothers. Atkinson's correspondence shows that he was highly satisfied with his decision to move to New Zealand, seeing it as an opportunity to prosper. He named his small farmhouse Hurworth after a village in England where he had lived as a boy, although—as his father worked as an itinerant builder and architect—the family did not settle anywhere.

== Military service ==
Atkinson was made a sergeant of the Taranaki Volunteer Rifle Company in February 1859 and then commissioned as a captain in March. He led No. 2 Company throughout the First Taranaki War and saw action at the Battles of Waireka, Mahoetahi and Kaitake. He was promoted to major in February 1864.

== Provincial politics ==
Atkinson first became involved in politics, as a member of the Taranaki provincial council. He represented the Grey and Bell electorate from 1857 to 1865, and again from 1873 to 1874. He was a member of the Executive Council from 1868 and again in 1874 (May to October). He was Deputy Superintendent in 1861–1862 to Charles Brown, and again in 1863.

Of particular interest to him was policy regarding Māori-owned land, which he wished to see taken over by the British settlers. Continued Māori ownership, he believed, prevented economic development for the colony. Atkinson and his Richmond relations regarded the Māori as "savages", and believed in war as a reasonable option for ensuring Māori co-operation with British land-acquisition.

== Member of Parliament ==
New Zealand Parliament
Years	Term	Electorate	Party
1861–1866	3rd	Grey and Bell	Independent
1867–1869	4th	Town of New Plymouth	Independent
1872–1875	5th	Egmont	Independent
1876–1879	6th	Egmont	Independent
1879–1881	7th	Egmont	Independent
1881–1884	8th	Egmont	Independent
1884–1887	9th	Egmont	Independent
1887–1890	10th	Egmont	Independent
1890–1891	11th	Egmont	Independent

The death of William Cutfield King in February 1861 caused a by-election in the Grey and Bell electorate. Atkinson was elected to Parliament unopposed. In 1864, he was made Defence Minister in the government of Frederick Weld. He was highly active in this portfolio, advocating a policy of self-reliance in the conduct of the war. In 1866, however, he retired due to the death of his wife Amelia (whom he had married in 1856). The following year, he married his cousin Annie. He returned to parliament from 1867 to 1869 for the Town of New Plymouth electorate, but in April 1869 he resigned to concentrate on maintaining his farm.

In 1872, Atkinson returned to politics for the Egmont electorate; to defeat William Sefton Moorhouse, who was allied with William Fox, a prominent supporter of Māori land rights. Atkinson declared that he would "not see a Foxite get in", and narrowly defeated Moorhouse. Once in parliament, Atkinson soon became involved in economic matters, opposing the policies of Julius Vogel (who also happened to be a supporter of Māori land rights). Vogel, who supported extensive borrowing to finance public works, was attacked by Atkinson as reckless. Vogel's response was that Atkinson was overly cautious, and would delay economic progress.

Atkinson and Vogel both agreed, however, that borrowing by provincial government (as opposed to the central government) was indeed out of control. The two also believed that provincial politicians were petty and self-interested, and that more co-operation was needed between provinces and the state. It was this shared view of provincial government that enabled Vogel and Atkinson to co-operate, although they never resolved their differences on borrowing by the central government or on dealings with the Māori. Atkinson eventually became part of Vogel's cabinet, but not with portfolios related to negotiations with Māori or to finance. He did continue to express his opinions on these matters, but found it increasingly harder to convince people of his views.

== Premier of New Zealand ==
=== First term ===
In 1876, Vogel retired, and Atkinson managed to secure the Premiership. One of his first acts was to abolish the provinces. He also took over direct responsibility for financial policy, and implemented a less aggressive strategy for borrowing. He attempted to reform the system by which money was handled, placing all responsibility for borrowing with the government while increasing control of spending at a district or municipal level. However, growing economic problems caused his plan to encounter difficulties. As the economy declined, Atkinson became more and more unpopular.

=== Second and third terms ===
Atkinson lost power in 1877, only slightly over a year after he gained it. He entered opposition, continuing to promote his ideas of financial caution. He also proposed a number of other measures, including national insurance. In 1883, he managed to make a comeback, gaining the Premiership for eleven months before losing it to Robert Stout. The two then engaged in a protracted struggle for the leadership. A strong counter-offensive by Atkinson enabled him to unseat Stout again after only twelve days. Stout, however, was not so easily defeated, and took the Premiership again after seven days. This time, Stout held his position for three years, defeating Atkinson's attempts to oust him.

=== Fourth term ===
There was confusion in Wellington in September 1887 when the members gathered to form a government. John Bryce, Robert Stout and William Rolleston had all lost their seats. Sir John Hall said he was too old. Sir Julius Vogel's policies had been rejected by the voters. So there was no alternative to Harry Atkinson, and after two weeks of negotiations he announced a ministry on 11 October. Only two ministers had served with him before. The Scarecrow Ministry was not expected to last, but did. The years 1887 and 1888 were the worst of the Long Depression, and Atkinson cut salaries, raised loans and raised customs duties. He was not popular with the wealthy, but they feared the Opposition leaders Grey and Ballance even more.

During this term, Atkinson was Colonial Treasurer (1887–1891), Postmaster-General (1887–1889), Commissioner of Telegraphs (1887–1889), Minister of Marine (1887–1891), Commissioner of Stamps (1887–1891), Minister of Education (1889), and Commissioner of Trade and Customs. In January 1888, Atkinson was appointed a Knight Commander of the Order of St Michael and St George. A Freemason, he was installed as the Wellington district grand master in May 1888.

By 1890 Atkinson was too ill to make speeches in the House.

=== Defeat ===
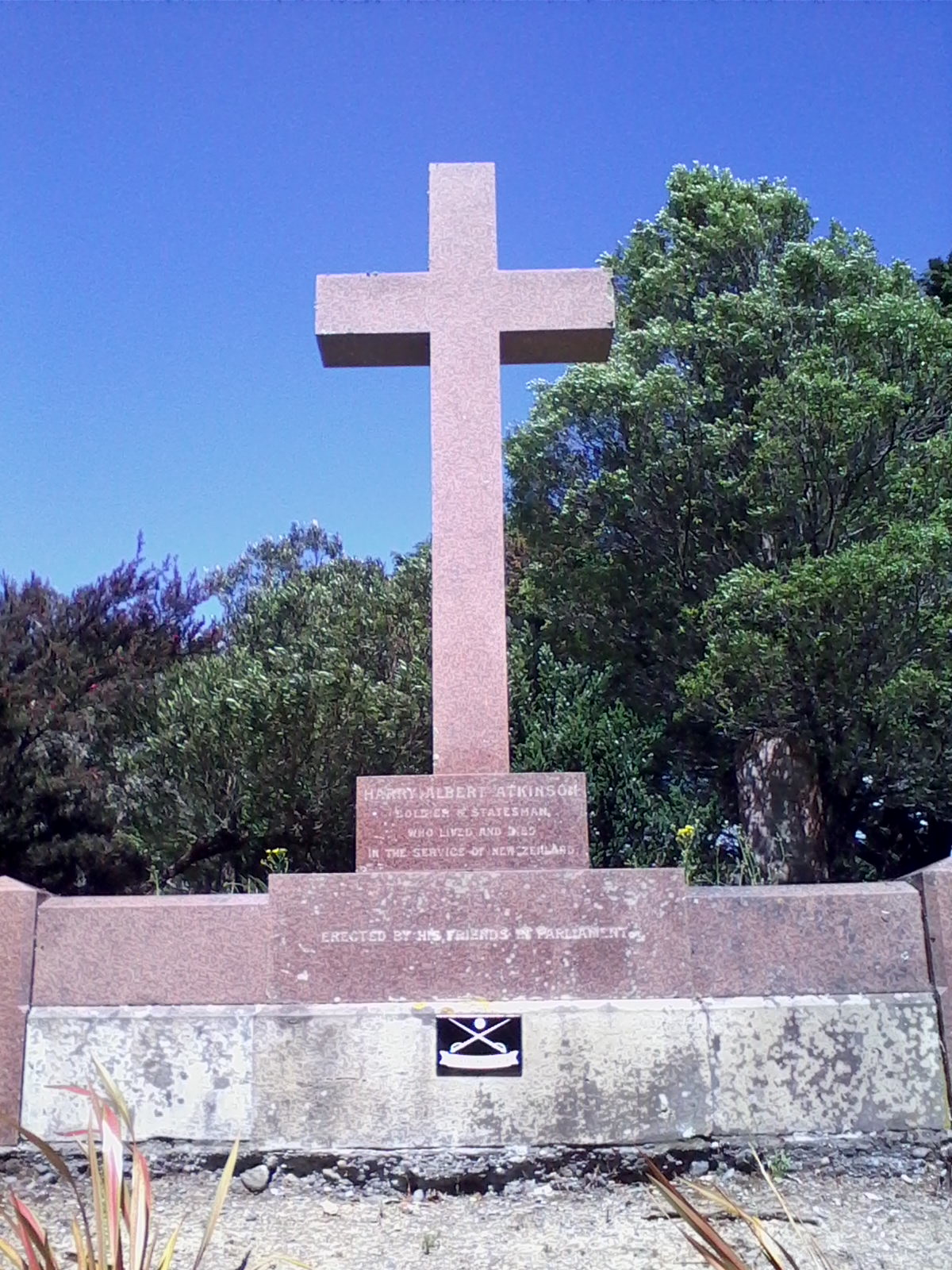
Harry Atkinson's grave in Karori Cemetery.

In 1891, Atkinson was finally superseded as Premier by John Ballance of the newly created Liberal Party, the country's first organised political party. Atkinson acceded to the wishes of his friends, and on 23 January 1891 he was appointed to the Legislative Council, along with six other men, to attempt to block any radical bills that Ballance might introduce in the Lower House. Ballance became Premier on 24 January, and appointed Atkinson as Speaker of the Legislative Council.

The Liberals, who represented the ideas of William Fox, Julius Vogel, and many other of Atkinson's opponents, were to hold power for 21 years after Atkinson's defeat, but Atkinson was not to see this. After presiding over the first meeting of the Council on 28 June in the 1892 session, Atkinson returned to the Speaker's Room, where he died. He was buried in Karori Cemetery.

== Notes ==
Government offices
Preceded by Julius Vogel	Premier of New Zealand; 1876–1877; 1883–1884; 1884; 1887–1891	Succeeded by George Grey
Preceded by Frederick Whitaker	Premier of New Zealand; 1876–1877; 1883–1884; 1884; 1887–1891	Succeeded by Robert Stout
Preceded by Robert Stout	Premier of New Zealand; 1876–1877; 1883–1884; 1884; 1887–1891	Succeeded by Robert Stout
Preceded by Robert Stout	Premier of New Zealand; 1876–1877; 1883–1884; 1884; 1887–1891	Succeeded by John Ballance
Political offices
Preceded by Julius Vogel	Postmaster-General and Commissioner of Telegraphs; 1887–1889	Succeeded by Edwin Mitchelson
Preceded by George Fisher	Minister of Education; 1889	Succeeded by Thomas William Hislop
Preceded by William Fitzherbert	Speaker of the New Zealand Legislative Council; 1891–1892	Succeeded by Henry Miller
New Zealand Parliament
Preceded by William Cutfield King	Member of Parliament for Grey and Bell; 1861–1866	Succeeded by James Crowe Richmond
Preceded by John Richardson	Member of Parliament for Town of New Plymouth; 1867–1869	Succeeded by Thomas Kelly
Preceded by William Gisborne	Member of Parliament for Egmont; 1872–1891	Succeeded by Felix McGuire
