= Grey and Bell =

Grey and Bell was a Taranaki electorate in the New Zealand Parliament from 1853 to 1881.

== Population centres ==
The electorate covered the northern, rural part of the Taranaki Province. The localities of Inglewood and Waitara fell within Grey and Bell.

== History ==
Thomas King resigned in 1855, but the seat was not filled before the next general election through a by-election. Brown resigned on 16 August 1856 to (unsuccessfully) contest the Taranaki superintendency. He was again elected in 1858 and resigned in 1860, when his militia service required his full attention.

In between Brown's terms, Lewthwaite represented the electorate, who resigned in 1858. Thomas King and William Cutfield King contested the 1860 election. The latter won the contest, but was killed in the New Zealand Wars before he could take up the seat. Robert Trimble won the 1879 election.

=== Members of Parliament ===
The following Members of Parliament represented Grey and Bell:

Key

Independent

Election	Winner
1853 election	Thomas King
1855 election	Charles Brown
1856 by-election	John Lewthwaite
1858 by-election	Charles Brown
1860 by-election	Thomas King
1860 election	William King
1861 by-election	Harry Atkinson
1866 election	James Richmond
1871 election	Frederic Carrington
1875 election	Frederic Carrington
1879 election	Robert Trimble

== Election results ==
=== 1858 by-election ===
1858 Grey and Bell by-election
Party	Candidate	Votes	%	±%
Independent	Charles Brown	75	55.1	
Independent	Dillon Bell	61	44.9	
Majority		14		
Turnout		136		

=== 1856 by-election ===
1856 Grey and Bell by-election
Party	Candidate	Votes	%	±%
Independent	John Lewthwaite	44	58.7	
Independent	R. Pheney	31	41.3	
Turnout		75		
Majority		13		
