= 1864 Town of New Plymouth by-election =

New Zealand by-election

The 1864 Town of New Plymouth by-election was a by-election held on 18 November 1864 in the Town of New Plymouth electorate during the 3rd New Zealand Parliament.

The by-election was caused by the resignation of the incumbent, Henry Hanson Turton on 21 October 1864.

He was replaced by Charles Brown. Brown was the only nomination, so was declared elected unopposed.
