= Arthur Atkinson (politician, born 1833) =

New Zealand politician (1833–1902)

Arthur Samuel Atkinson
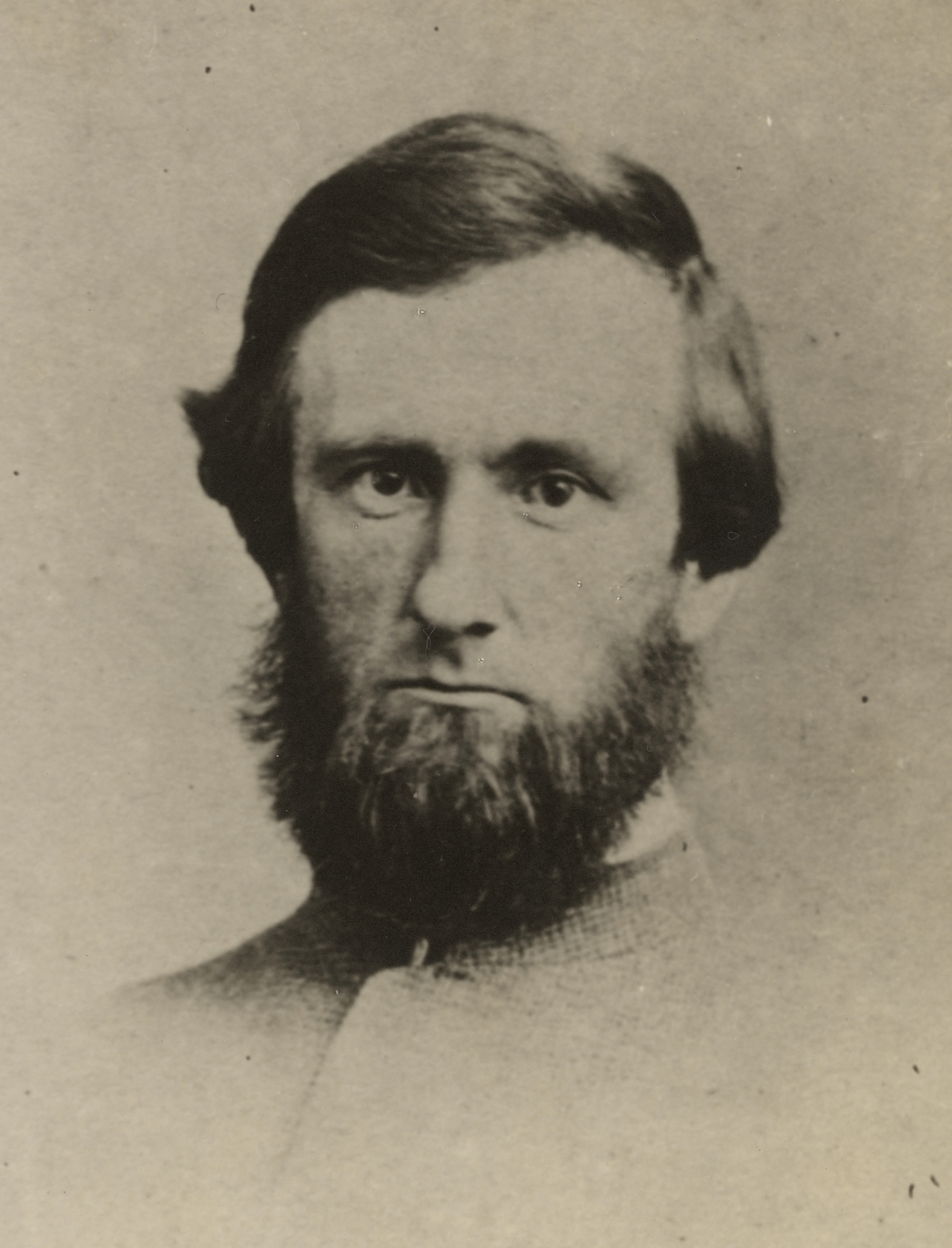
- Arthur Samuel Atkinson in 1860

Member of Parliament for Omata
- In office 1866–1867
- Preceded by: Francis Gledhill
- Succeeded by: Charles Brown

Personal details
- Born: 20 October 1833
- Died: 10 December 1902 (aged 69) Fairfield, Nelson, New Zealand
- Party: Independent
- Spouse: Jane Maria Richmond
- Relations: Harry Atkinson (brother)
- Occupation: Politician, Lawyer, Naturalist

Arthur Samuel Atkinson (20 October 1833 – 10 December 1902) was a 19th-century Member of Parliament from the Taranaki Region, New Zealand.

== Biography ==
New Zealand Parliament
Years	Term	Electorate	Party
1866–1867	4th	Omata	Independent

He represented the Omata electorate from the 1866 election to 1867, when he resigned.

He had not been elected for Omata in the 1865 by-election.

He was a brother of Premier Harry Atkinson, and part of the Richmond–Atkinson family. He married Jane Maria Richmond in 1854.

He later moved to Nelson, and became a lawyer. He studied Māori people, languages and natural sciences. He died at Fairfield, the house that he had built in 1872.

New Zealand Parliament
Preceded by Francis Gledhill	Member of Parliament for Omata; 1866–1867	Succeeded by Charles Brown
