= Maria Atkinson =

New Zealand pioneer, writer, and mountaineer

Jane Maria Atkinson (née Richmond; 15 September 1824 – 29 September 1914) was a New Zealand pioneer, writer, and the first Pākehā woman to climb Mount Taranaki.

== Early life ==
Maria grew up in a Unitarian household. The early death of her father, Christopher Richmond, caused financial strife for the family. At the age of 28, Maria and her family left for New Zealand along with the Hursthouses, Richmonds, and Ronalds. There were many inter-marriages between these family which became referred to as 'the mob' that settled around New Plymouth. The Richmonds arrived in Auckland 25 May 1853. They then settled in the early New Plymouth colony. She and Arthur Atkinson had a shipboard romance and were married 30 December 1854.

== New Zealand ==
Maria initially fulfilled the traditional role of pioneering housewife and mother. When she and Arthur moved to Nelson in 1867 she became active in the community. She promoted women's suffrage, campaigned for a girl's college and ran a debate team. The Atkinsons allowed the newly opened Nelson College for Girls faculty to use their home, Fairfield House.

In 1855 Maria climbed Mount Taranaki as part of a party including her husband. She was invited along to act as cook and became the first Pākehā woman to climb the mountain. She wore a pair of 'canvas trousers' for the climb.
