= James Crowe Richmond =

New Zealand politician (1822–1898)

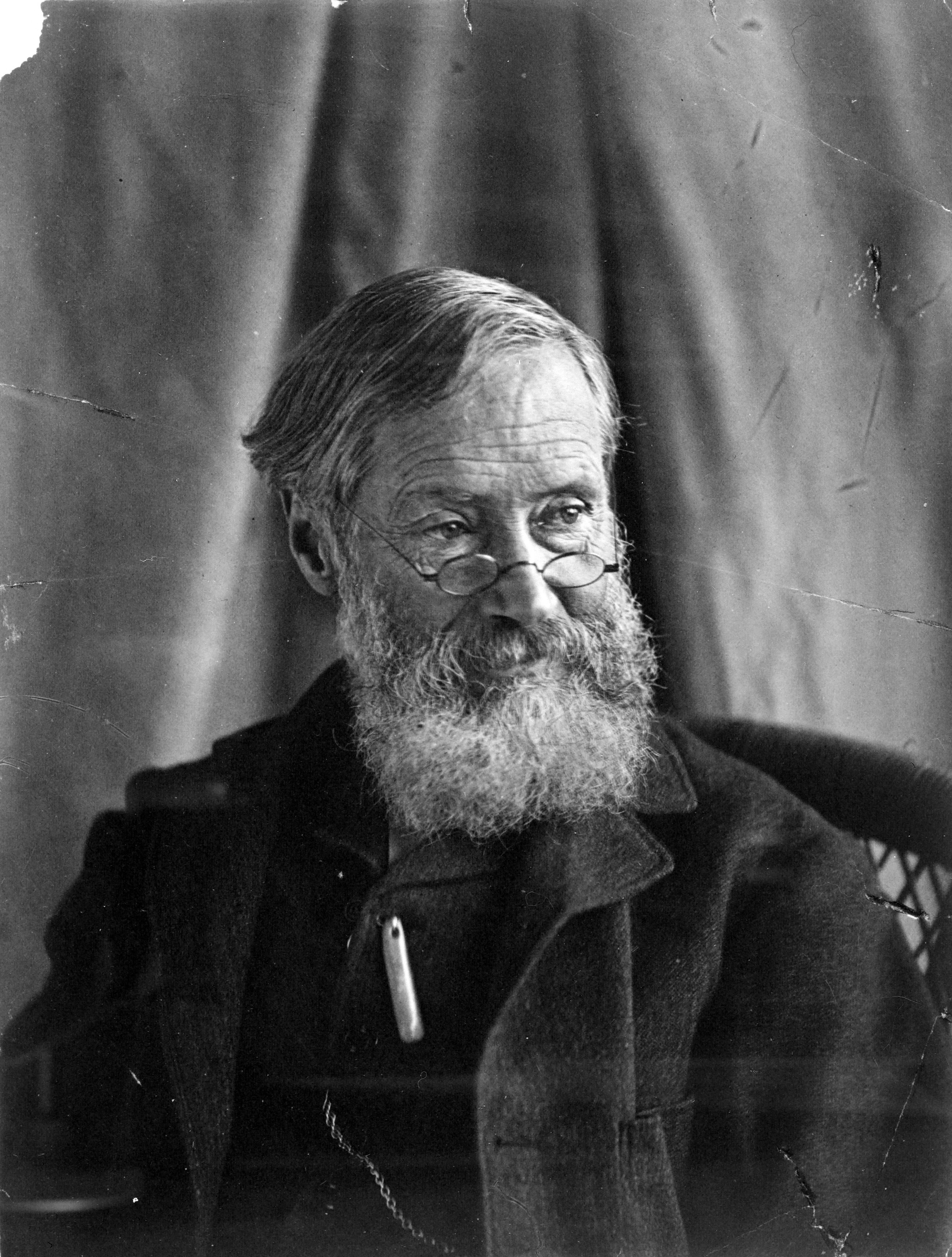
- James Crowe Richmond in his later years

Member of the New Zealand Parliament for Omata
- In office 1860–1865

Member of the New Zealand Parliament for Grey and Bell
- In office 1866–1870

Personal details
- Born: 22 September 1822 London, England
- Died: 19 January 1898 (aged 75) Ōtaki, New Zealand
- Spouse: Mary Smith (m. 1856; died 1865)
- Children: 5, including Dolla Richmond
- Relatives: Henry Richmond (brother); William Richmond (brother); Maria Atkinson (sister)
- Occupation: engineer, artist, politician, journalist, administrator
- Profession: engineer

James Crowe Richmond (22 September 1822 – 19 January 1898) was a New Zealand politician, engineer, and an early painter in watercolours of the New Zealand landscape.

== Early life ==
Richmond was born in London, England, the son of Christopher Richmond, barrister and his wife, Maria Wilson. He was educated at Hackney Grammar School, at Hove House, Brighton and at the school attached to University College London. He was apprenticed to the engineer Samuel Clegg and from 1845 served on the staff of Isambard Kingdom Brunel for three years working on the Great Western Railway in southern England.

Richmond emigrated to New Zealand with his younger brother Henry Richmond on the Victory on 3 October 1850. The ship arrived in Auckland in February 1851 and the two walked south to Taranaki where they purchased a few acres near the home of their aunt Helen, who had married John Hursthouse and had also settled in Taranaki. Eventually members of the Richmond, Hursthouse, Atkinson and Ronald families, who were related by marriage, all settled near one another in the area.

Richmond returned to England in 1854 and married Mary Smith on 21 August 1856 before returning to New Zealand on the Kenilworth, which arrived in New Plymouth on 8 July 1857.

== Political career ==
New Zealand Parliament
Years	Term	Electorate	Party
1860	2nd	Omata	Independent
1860–1865	3rd	Omata	Independent
1866–1870	4th	Grey and Bell	Independent

Richmond was elected unopposed as Member of Parliament for Omata at a 16 April 1860 by-election. He remained in Parliament until he resigned in 1865, as he was called to the Legislative Council, where he remained for only four months. He then represented Grey and Bell from 1866 to 1870, when he was defeated.

Mary had left for Nelson with other Taranaki refugees from the New Zealand Wars in 1860. In 1862 he joined her and became the editor of the Nelson Examiner while continuing his political career. After the fall of the Fox Ministry, he also became the Commissioner of Crown Lands. He served on the Nelson Provincial Council and was appointed provincial secretary from 2 March 1863 to March 1865. He was elected in the Amuri electorate and was a provincial councillor from 31 August 1864 to 14 September 1865.

== Art ==
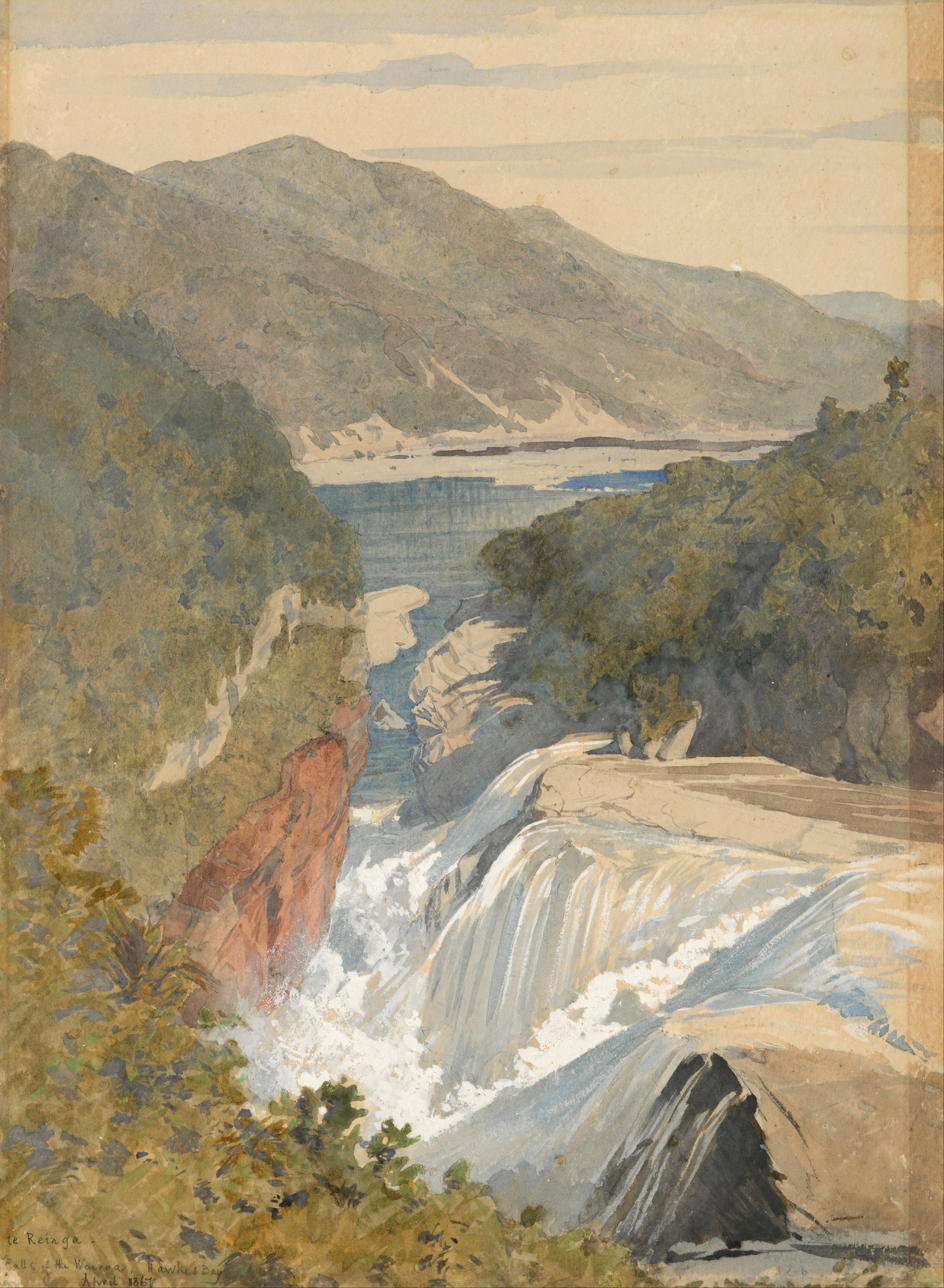
Te Reinga, Falls of the Wairoa, Hawke's Bay New Zealand, watercolor painting by James Crowe Richmond, 1867, Te Papa

He formed a close and lifelong friendship with John Gully and continued to paint and sketch in what little spare time he had. He is particularly notable for his work in watercolours, but in 1865, he exhibited work at the Dunedin Exhibition and won a silver medal for an oil painting. He went to exhibit regularly for the Otago Art Society. Several of his paintings are held in the National Art Gallery and in the Alexander Turnbull Library.

== Later life ==
Mary died in Nelson on 29 October 1865 having never fully recovered from the birth of her fifth child, and this event left Richmond 'harassed & broken'. However, by 1866 he was back in politics and moved his family to Taranaki. By 1869 the family had moved back to Nelson. Other family connections were also living there, including his brother William's family and his sister Maria and her husband, Arthur Atkinson.

Richmond travelled with his three eldest children to England and Europe in 1873 but returned to Nelson by January 1881. He continued to travel frequently. His daughter Dolla Richmond was an artist and art teacher.

== Death ==
Richmond died at the house of his daughter, Ann Elizabeth, in Ōtaki, which he was visiting, on 19 January 1898.

New Zealand Parliament
Preceded by Alfred William East	Member of Parliament for Omata; 1860–1865	Succeeded by Francis Gledhill
Preceded by Harry Atkinson	Member of Parliament for Grey and Bell; 1866–1870	Succeeded by Frederic Carrington
