= Charles Brown (New Zealand politician) =

New Zealand politician from the Taranaki area

Charles Brown (1820 – 2 September 1901) was a New Zealand politician from the Taranaki area.

== Personal life ==
Brown was born in London, England, the son of Charles Armitage Brown (the close friend and biographer of the poet John Keats) and Abigail O'Donohue, an Irish house servant at Wentworth Place, where Brown and Keats resided. Brown said later in life that his parents were married in a Catholic service in Ireland in August 1819, but this claim seems to be discounted by biographers as an attempt to cover up his illegitimacy, which was a social stigma in those times.

At the age of two, he was taken by his father to Italy, where they lived for a number of years, initially in Pisa and later in Florence. Brown received all his early education in Italy from his father. In his writings his father refers to his son by the name "Carlino", and this appeared to be his commonly used name in England and Europe. In 1826 at age six, Carlino's portrait was painted by artist Joseph Severn, who had nursed Keats in his final illness.

Around 1836 in order to provide a better education for Brown, they returned to England and lived in Plymouth. Unlike his literary father, Brown had a more pragmatic nature and was attracted to civil engineering.

In 1840, his father became a shareholder in the newly formed Plymouth Company, which aimed to colonise New Plymouth, New Zealand. Shortly afterwards, his father's finances were ruined when he was forced to repay a friend's loan having agreed to be guarantor. With what little fortune remained to him, his father decided that they should emigrate to New Plymouth, as a pioneer community would provide the best opportunities for Carlino as a civil engineer given their limited capital. Aged 17, Brown junior emigrated on the Amelia Thompson, the first settler ship of the Plymouth Company, arriving in 1841. His father followed on the Oriental, arriving three weeks later.

Brown and his father lived on top of a hill near the mouth of Te Hēnui Stream, in what is now the suburb of Welbourn. The short Brown Street in that area is named in the family's honour. His father died of an apoplectic stroke on 5 June 1842, just eight months after his arrival in New Plymouth. He was buried on Marsland Hill above the original St Mary's church.

Brown married twice; first, on 13 May 1851, Margaret Joy Horne with whom he had four daughters (and a son who died as a baby), and then Jessie Northcroft, with whom he had twin sons and a daughter. The children of the first marriage included:

- Laura Brown (later Mrs Tobin)
- Jessie Brown (later Mrs Brown)
- Lucy Brown

and from his second marriage:

- William A. Brown
- Charles Keats Brown
- Mona Martha Brown (later Mrs Gordon Osbourne)

== Professional life ==
In 1839, Brown went to Midhurst in West Sussex to visit his uncle William. There he met Robert Chorley who agreed to employ and train him as a millwright and engineer. After serving a probationary term, Brown complained to his father that Chorley was no more than a simple millwright, and so after his apprenticeship he would have to look for employment elsewhere to obtain the promised qualification. By the end of the following year, the arrangement with Chorley was ended and Brown was engaged on designing a "machine for cutting tobacco".

Brown brought saw-milling equipment with him to New Plymouth and established a successful timber business. He also founded and owned the newspaper Taranaki News from 1859.

In 1855, Carlino Brown – now, in New Zealand, known as Charles – became a member of the militia with the rank of Captain. He served in the New Zealand Wars, in particular, the First Taranaki War and the Second Taranaki War. In 1860, Brown commanded a force of 150 militia and volunteers in a major battle against three or four hundred Maori at Waireka Hill. He was promoted to the rank of Major on 7 November 1864. He was widely known as "The Major" in his community thereafter.

== Political career ==
In 1852, the Constitution Act divided the colony into six provinces, each with an elected Provincial Council and governed by a Superintendent. On 16 July 1853 at age 33, Charles Brown was elected first Superintendent of the Taranaki Provincial Government. He was defeated at the next election and retired from the position on 4 January 1857. On 24 May 1861, he was again elected as Superintendent, holding that office until 4 September 1865. After the death of Edward Stafford in February 1901, he became the last surviving member of the six original provincial superintendents elected in 1853.

New Zealand Parliament
Years	Term	Electorate	Party
1855–1856	2nd	Grey and Bell	Independent
1858–1860	2nd	Grey and Bell	Independent
1864–1865	3rd	Town of New Plymouth	Independent
1868–1870	4th	Omata	Independent

He served two separate terms in the 2nd New Zealand Parliament as representative for the Grey and Bell electorate. He was elected at the general election on 8 November 1855 and resigned on 16 August 1856 to (unsuccessfully) contest the superintendency.

He contested a 17 May 1858 by-election against Dillon Bell in the Grey and Bell electorate. Brown and Bell received 75 and 61 votes, respectively. Brown was thus declared elected. He resigned in 1860, when his militia service required his full attention.

He later served in the 3rd New Zealand Parliament as representative for the Town of New Plymouth electorate from 1864 to 1865, and in the 4th New Zealand Parliament as representative for the Omata electorate from 1868 to 1870.

He was Colonial Treasurer (forerunner to the modern Minister of Finance) in the first Fox Ministry under Premier William Fox.

With three others, Brown contested the New Plymouth electorate in the 1884 election, but he came last.

== Later life ==
Later in life, Charles served the community of New Plymouth as a Maori interpreter, having learned the language and customs of the Maori people over his long life in New Plymouth.

In the 1890s, Brown donated memorabilia of John Keats to the Keats House museum. Some he had inherited from his father, Keats' friend Charles Armitage Brown, while others were obtained from Keats' relatives and friends and their descendants with whom the Brown family remained in contact over the years. His descendants continued to donate Keats memorabilia over the years.

In 1901, aged 81, he stepped back into the path of a train in New Plymouth while crossing the main street of the town and was killed. The death of such a local celebrity, which was witnessed by many citizens, led to the relocation of the railway line.

Like his father, he was buried on Marsland Hill. His headstone names him as Charles Keats Brown.

== Popular culture ==
Charles Brown featured in the 2009 film Bright Star, written and directed by Jane Campion which focuses on the final years of John Keats' life and his relationship with Fanny Brawne and Charles's father Charles Armitage Brown. In the film, Charles Armitage Brown (played by actor Paul Schneider) is presented as close to "a villain, a cynical boor who knocks up his housemaid (Antonia Campbell-Hughes) and banishes Fanny so the boys can work on their plays and poems". Abigail, the pregnant housemaid in the movie was presumably intended to represent Abigail O'Donohue, Charles Brown's mother. In one scene, Abigail shows off her baby to the Brawne family.

New Zealand Parliament
Preceded by Thomas King	Member of Parliament for Grey and Bell; 1855–1856; 1858–1860	Succeeded by John Lewthwaite
Preceded by John Lewthwaite	Member of Parliament for Grey and Bell; 1855–1856; 1858–1860	Succeeded by Thomas King
Preceded by Henry Hanson Turton	Member of Parliament for Town of New Plymouth; 1864–1865	Succeeded by Henry Sewell
Preceded by Arthur Atkinson	Member of Parliament for Omata; 1868–1870	Succeeded by Frederic Carrington
Political offices
First	Superintendent of Taranaki Province; 1853–1857; 1861 1865	Succeeded by George Cutfield
Preceded by George Cutfield	Superintendent of Taranaki Province; 1853–1857; 1861 1865	Succeeded by Henry Richmond
