= Taranaki Province =

Coordinates: 39°18′S 174°8′E

Taranaki Porowini o Taranaki
- Provinces of New Zealand
- Formerly New Plymouth
- Taranaki Province within New Zealand post 1853
- Country: New Zealand
- Island: North Island
- Established: 1853
- Abolished: 1876
- Named for: Mount Taranaki
- Seat: New Plymouth

The Taranaki Province was a province of New Zealand from 1853 until the abolition of provincial government in 1876. Initially known as New Plymouth Province, the province was renamed on 1 January 1859 as the Taranaki Province.

== Area ==
With an area of some 2,000,000 acres (8,100 km^{2}), New Plymouth Province was the smallest of the initial six provinces, and it was also the least populous. European settlement started in New Plymouth in 1841, which was the province's capital. For the first 30 years, European settlement did not extend many miles beyond New Plymouth.

== History ==
At the beginning of the 19th century, a coastal fringe some 2 to 4 miles (3.2 to 6.4 km) deep was densely populated with Māori. Iwi from the Waikato region threatened these Ngāti Awa, and during the 1820s, many of the inhabitants left Taranaki. In 1832, Waikato iwi launched an assault with firearms, resulting in the remaining Ngāti Awa being killed or going into slavery apart from the Otaku pā in New Plymouth. When English emigrants arrived in 1841, they found deserted land.

The settlement of the province was organised by the Plymouth Company, a subsidiary of the New Zealand Company which was later absorbed into its parent company. Taranaki was chosen for the settlement by the surveyor Frederic Carrington, and New Plymouth was the only town founded in the country founded through organised settlement that lacked a natural harbour. Carrington argued that fertile land and natural harbours don't come together in New Zealand, and that the land is more important for the settlement, and an artificial harbour will later be affordable. He was present when the breakwater was built 40 years after New Plymouth had been founded.

== Anniversary Day ==
New Zealand law provides an anniversary day for each province. Taranaki Anniversary Day is celebrated annually on the second Monday in March.

== Superintendents ==
The Taranaki Province had four Superintendents:

No.	from	to	Superintendent
1	18 Jul 1853	13 Dec 1856	Charles Brown
2	3 Feb 1857	Jun/Jul 1861	George Cutfield
	Jun/Jul 1861	8 Aug 1865	Charles Brown (2nd time)
3	7 Sep 1865	8 Sep 1869	Henry Richmond
4	2 Oct 1869	1 Jan 1877	Frederic Carrington

== Legislation ==
No surviving legislation.
