= Johann Riemenschneider =

Protestant missionary in New Zealand

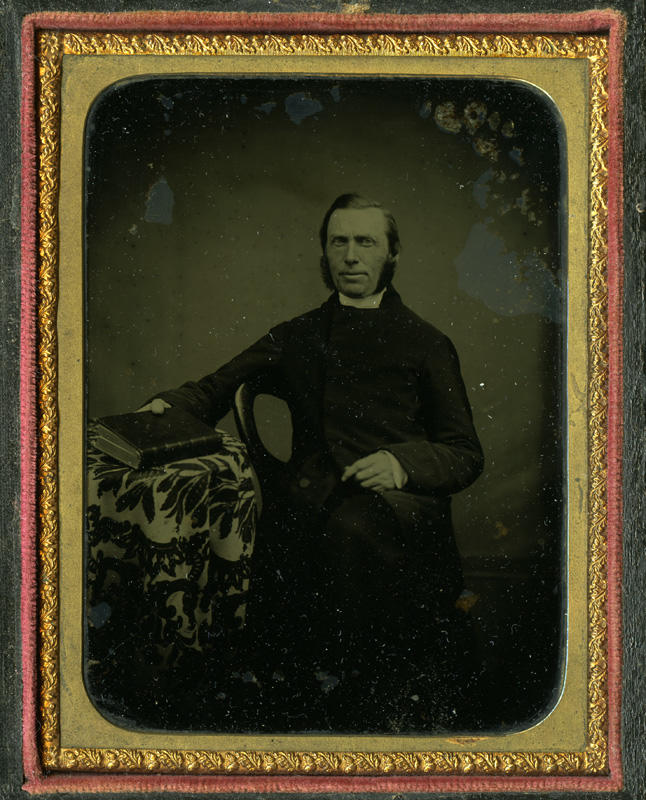
- Born: 6 August 1817; Bremen, German Confederation
- Died: 31 August 1866 (aged 49); Otago Heads, Otago Province, New Zealand
- Burial place: Port Chalmers, New Zealand
- Education: North German Missionary Society
- Years active: 1843–1866
- Religion: Protestant
- Church: Free Church of Scotland
- Ordained: 1863
- Title: Reverend

Johann Riemenschneider (Note: Forename is variously given as Johann Friedrich, John Frederick, Johann Carl, and Johannes Carl) (6 August 1817 – 31 August 1866) was a Protestant (Note: Riemenschneider has been variously described as Lutheran, Methodist, and Presbyterian) missionary in New Zealand. Riemenschneider was born in the city of Bremen and studied under the North German Missionary Society in Hamburg before departing for New Zealand.

== Early life ==
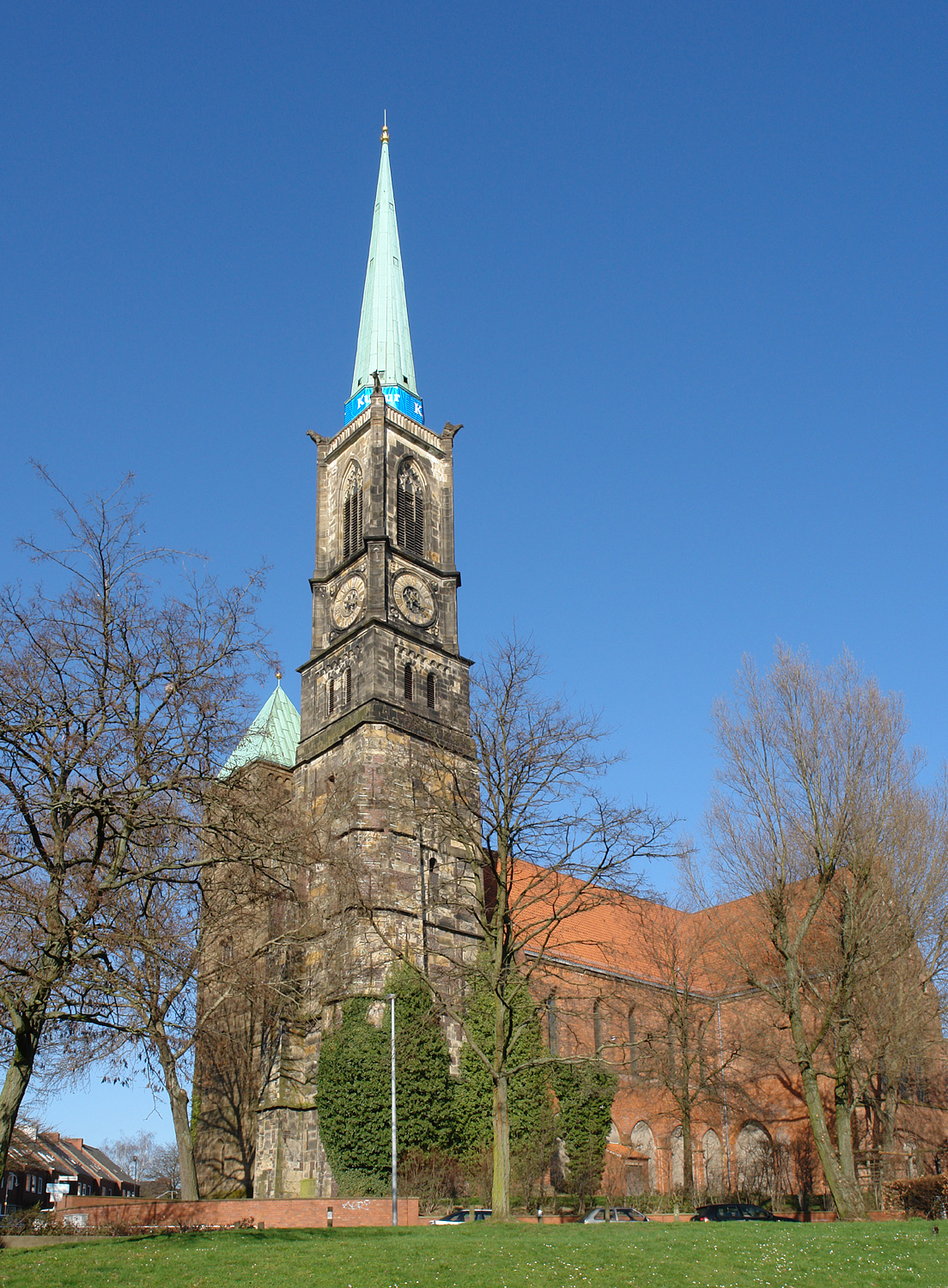
St Stephen's Church in Bremen

Johann Riemenschneider was born 6 August 1817 in Bremen. Riemenschneider was a member of St Stephen's parish in Bremen. In 1837 Riemenschneider moved to Hamburg to study under the North German Missionary Society. Johan Wohlers was a fellow student and friend of Riemenschneider at the Mission Society school. The two men were taught English, algebra, geography, natural history, trigonometry, and music in addition to theological studies. In 1842 their study was finished and they departed for New Zealand, arriving in Nelson aboard the St Pauli alongside Johann Heine in June 1843.

== Missionary career ==
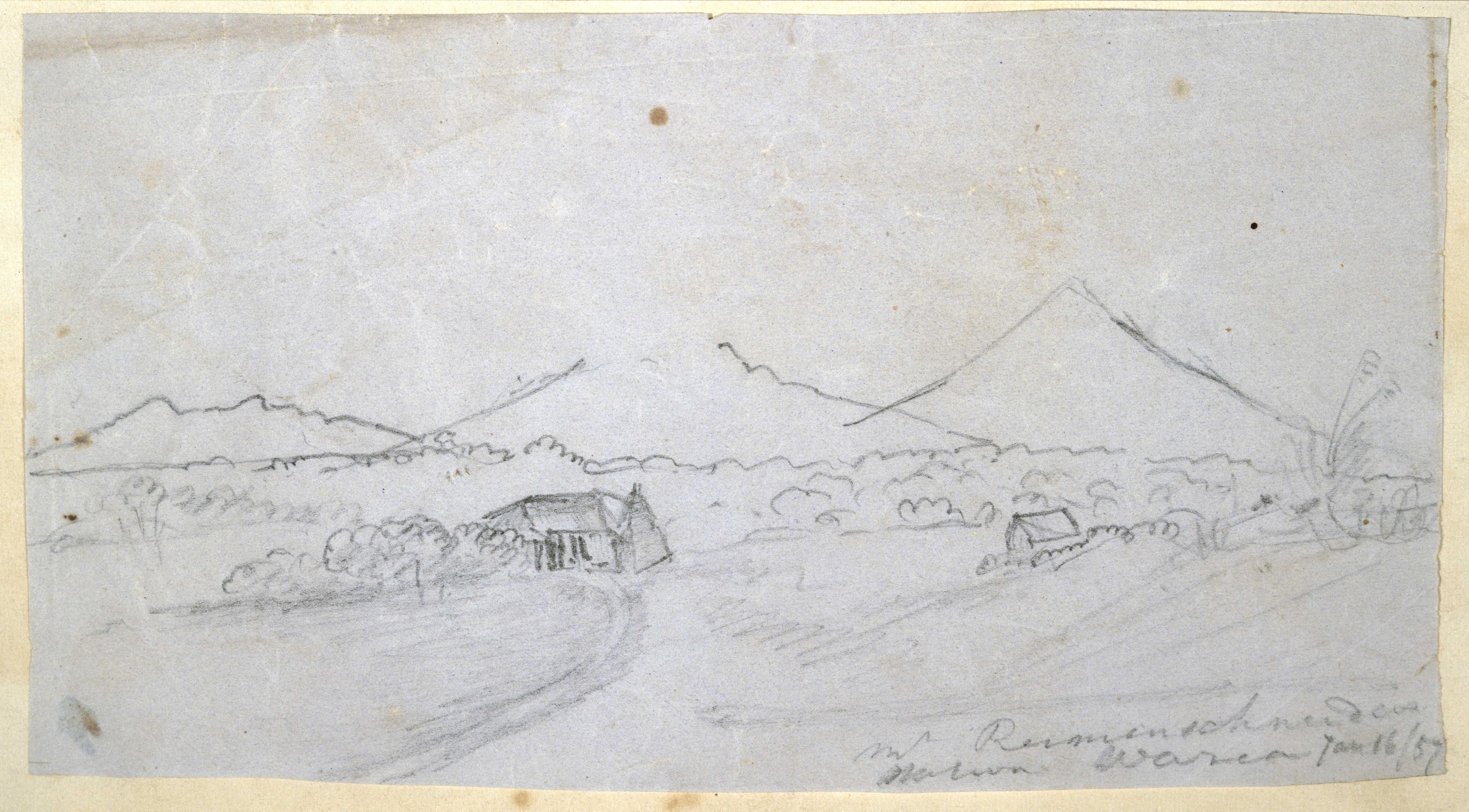
Riemenschneider's home in Warea

Riemenschneider conducted sermons for German settlers in Nelson for a short while before heading to Taupo to establish a mission. Upon arrival at Taupo, Riemenschneider discovered that a Catholic mission had already been established up and instead went to Motu Karamu, a pā on the Mokau River. In 1846 Riemenschneider established a mission station at Warea. Notable students of Riemenschneiders include Te Whiti-o-Rongomai and Tohu Kakahi, who went on to found the Parihaka settlement. Riemenschneider had a rapport with the local Māori and was a medium for contact between the Crown and Taranaki Māori during the First Taranaki War. Many Mãori grew hostile to missionaries during the war and Riemenschneider was advised by Governor Thomas Gore Browne to evacuate; Riemenschneider moved his family to Nelson but returned to the Warea mission station.

In 1862 Riemenschneider was offered a posting in Otago as missioner for Otago Mãori and settled at the Otago Heads. A year later he was ordained a minister for the Free Church of Scotland. Riemenschneider died on 31 August 1866, and is buried at the Old Port Chalmers Cemetery.

== Personal life ==
Riemenschneider married Katherine Woon in 1849. After Johann's death Katherine was unable to support her family with his pension and requested financial assistance from Donald McLean.
