= Te Whiti o Rongomai =

New Zealand Māori spiritual leader (c. 1830–1907)

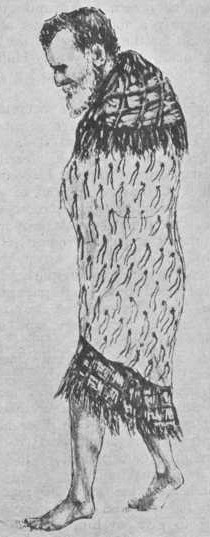
Te Whiti being led from Parihaka, November 1881

Te Whiti o Rongomai III (c. 1830 – 18 November 1907) was a Māori spiritual leader and founder of the village of Parihaka, in New Zealand's Taranaki region.

A proponent of nonviolence, Te Whiti established Parihaka community as a place of sanctuary and peace for Māori many of whom took refuge as their land was confiscated in the early 1860s. Parihaka became a place of peaceful resistance to the encroaching confiscations.

On 5 November 1881, the village was invaded by 1500 Armed Constabulary with its leaders arrested and put on trial. Te Whiti was sent to Christchurch at the Crown's insistence after it was clear the crown was losing its case in New Plymouth. The trial, however, was never reconvened and Te Whiti, along with Tohu were held for two years. Te Whiti and Tohu returned to Parihaka in 1883, seeking to rebuild Parihaka as a place of learning and cultural development though land protests continued.

Te Whiti was imprisoned on two further occasions after 1885 before his death in 1907.

== Biography ==
Te Whiti was born in Ngāmotu, Taranaki, New Zealand, about 1830. One account makes him the son of Hone Kakahi of the Te Āti Awa iwi and of Rangi Kauwau. Another version sees him as the son of Tohukakahi (a minor chief of the Patukai hapu of the Ngāti Tāwhirikura branch of the Te Ati Awa tribe), and of Rangiawau (daughter of Te Whetu).

As a youngster, Te Whiti was well educated by Māori elders, who taught him about the traditions of his culture. Educated at a mission school, he later set up a flour mill in Warea.

In 1862 Te Whiti saved the lives of the crew and passengers of the Lord Worsley, which was wrecked on the Taranaki coast 80 km south of New Plymouth. When Māori threatened the survivors on the beach Te Whiti came to the rescue. He had a bullock killed and fed the survivors, sent a message to New Plymouth and arranged transport in carts to escort the survivors back to New Plymouth. This was the first occasion that government officials noted the existence of Te Whiti. He was believed to be about 30 at the time. In 1867 the great Māori chief established a village at Parihaka. He wanted his people to regain their land, pride and self-respect after the confiscations in other parts of the North Island. His aim seems to have been to establish a new way for Māori to resist European attempts to take what was left of Taranaki.

With his close relative, Tohu Kakahi, Te Whiti led the people of Parihaka in their nonviolent resistance to the confiscation of Māori land by the New Zealand Government.

It also appears preacher Minarapa Te Rangihatuake taught Te Whiti scripture and to read and write. Te Whiti also became a pupil of Lutheran missionary Johannes Riemenschneider. While the Parihaka prophet turned his back on all acts of violence, he wasn't going to give up land without a fight. And so began his practice of passive resistance.

"Though some, in darkness of heart, seeing their land ravished, might wish to take arms and kill the aggressors, I say it must not be. Let not the Pakehas (sic) think to succeed by reason of their guns ... I want not war, but they do. The flashes of their guns have singed our eyelashes, and yet they say they do not want war ... The government come not hither to reason, but go to out-of-the-way places. They work secretly, but I speak in public so that all may hear," Te Whiti told his people in March 1880.

By that time, Parihaka had become a stronghold of Taranaki-Māori opposition to the loss of tribal lands – the losses had arisen from the Land Wars of 1845-1872 and from subsequent Crown legislation on land confiscation. The government passed the Suppression of Rebellion Act 1863 to punish Māori "rebels" who had fought against the Crown – mainly in Taranaki and the Waikato. The Act defined Māori fighting against the government as "rebels," who could be detained indefinitely, without trial. Te Whiti and Tohu Kakahi were incarcerated (1881 onwards), but Māori ploughmen came from all over the country to assist Taranaki Māori to re-occupy their confiscated land and to prevent the building of roads (May 1879 onwards). The New Zealand authorities arrested hundreds of Māori and confiscated their property. British newspaper reports of the Māori ploughmen's non-violent struggle influenced the thinking of Indian nationalist Mahatma Gandhi during his sojourn in South Africa from 1893 to 1914.

== References in modern culture ==
- Dunedin musician Jeremy Callander wrote a song about Te Whiti and Parihaka.
- Tim Finn has a song on his self-titled album called "Parihaka" about Te Whiti.
- Don McGlashan has a song titled "18th Day" which is about the return of Te Whiti from detention
- On the album Pendulum by Little Bushman, there is a song titled "Peaceful Man" which is about Te Whiti.
- Poet Gregory O'Brien has a poem called "For Te Whiti o Rongomai" in his 2005 collection Afternoon of an Evening Train.
- Numerous artists have used Te Whiti as a subject or inspiration, among them Colin McCahon (with his painting Te Whiti, Tohu) and Ralph Hotere (Te Whiti drawing-painting), both of which were produced for a 1972 exhibition about Te Whiti, "Taranaki Saw it All".
