= Howard Richmond =

New Zealand lawyer (1878–1974)

Howard Richmond QC
- Born: 30 March 1878; New Plymouth, New Zealand
- Died: 12 January 1974 (aged 95); Auckland, New Zealand
- Occupations: barrister and solicitor
- Known for: senior member of the New Zealand bar

Howard Parris Richmond QC (30 March 1878 – 12 January 1974) was a New Zealand lawyer.

== Early life ==
Richmond was born in New Plymouth on 30 March 1878. Henry Richmond (1829–1890), the Superintendent of Taranaki Province, was his father. Emma Jane Richmond, née Parris (1845–1921), was his mother. He received his education at New Plymouth Boys' High School and at Christchurch Boys' High School. He received his tertiary education at Victoria University College (one year) and at Canterbury University College (two years), after which he graduated in June 1900 with a Bachelor of Arts. He was president of the students' association in 1900.

== Professional life ==
Richmond joined Buddle, Button and Co in Auckland, where Thomas Buddle (1847–1918), Charles Button (1838–1920) and Charles Frederick Buddle (1858–1929) were partners. The name of the firm changed to Buddle, Richmond, and Buddle in July 1915, with Thomas Buddle, Charles Frederick Buddle, Harold Dixon (son of Thomas Buddle, 1884–1961), and Richmond as partners. Upon the death of Thomas Buddle, Richmond became a senior partner.

== Community engagement ==
Richmond was the president of the Auckland District Law Society in 1920 and 1921. In June 1933, Richmond was elected fellow of the Royal Empire Society.

Richmond was the captain of the Auckland Golf Club in 1919. From 1938 to 1947, he was the club's president.

== Awards ==
In 1952, Richmond was appointed Queen's Counsel.

== Family ==
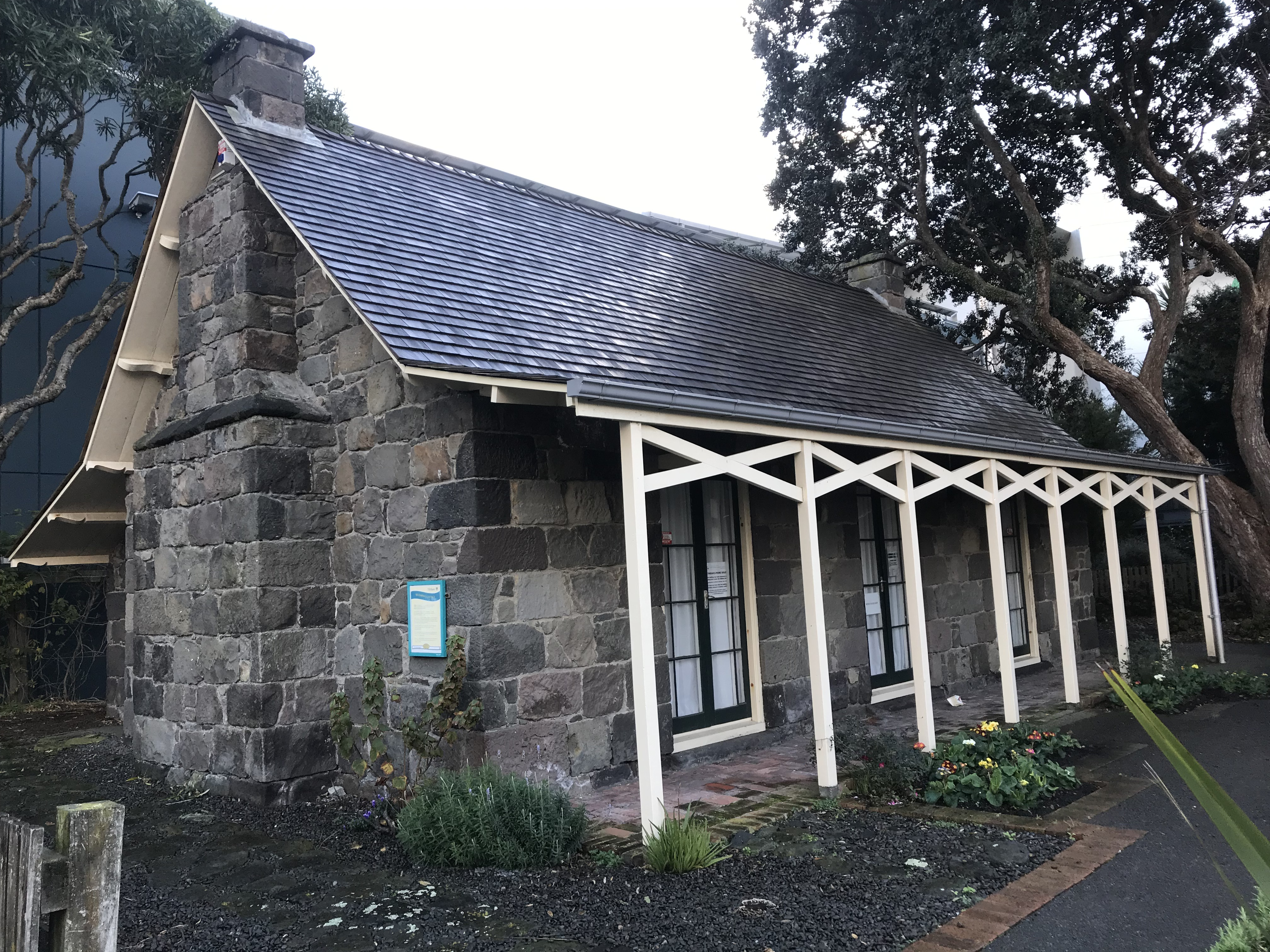
Richmond Cottage in 2019

On 23 February 1909, Richmond married Elsie McTavish at St Paul's Cathedral in Wellington. The judge Clifford Richmond (1914–1997) was their son. The Richmonds divorced and his first wife died in December 1946.

On 20 December 1935, Richmond married Frances Muriel Richards at St Luke's Church in Remuera, with Alexander Johnstone KC acting as best man.

His uncle William Richmond had a cottage built in 1853/54 at the beach in New Plymouth by Henry Richmond (William's brother) and Arthur Atkinson (married to William's daughter Maria Richmond). The cottage was relocated and it reopened in 1963 by Howard Richmond. Richmond Cottage is registered as a Category I heritage structure by Heritage New Zealand.

Richmond died on 12 January 1974 in Auckland.

== See also ==
- List of King's and Queen's Counsel in New Zealand
