= Clifford Richmond =

New Zealand lawyer and judge

The Right Honourable Sir Clifford Richmond KBE

President of the Court of Appeal
- In office 1976–1981
- Preceded by: Thaddeus McCarthy
- Succeeded by: Owen Woodhouse

Personal details
- Born: Clifford Parris Richmond; 23 June 1914 Auckland, New Zealand
- Died: 29 January 1997 (aged 82) Auckland, New Zealand
- Spouse: Valerie Jean Hamilton (m. 1939)
- Parent: Howard Richmond (father)
- Relatives: Henry Richmond (grandfather); Emma Jane Richmond (grandmother); Robert Parris (great-grandfather); James Crowe Richmond (great-uncle); William Richmond (great-uncle); Maria Atkinson (great-aunt)

Sir Clifford Parris "Kip" Richmond KBE PC (23 June 1914 – 29 January 1997) was a New Zealand lawyer and judge. He served as president of the Court of Appeal of New Zealand between 1976 and 1981.

== Biography ==
Richmond was born on 23 June 1914 in Auckland. His father was Howard Richmond. He attended Auckland University College and Victoria University College, graduating LLM with first-class honours in 1937. On 16 March 1938 he married Valerie Jean Hamilton at St Andrew's Church in central Auckland. During World War II he was an officer in the New Zealand Artillery. Richmond served in the Fourth Field Regiment in North Africa and Italy. He was mentioned in despatches, attained the rank of major and became the personal staff officer to General Freyberg.

He practised as a partner in the firm Buddle Richmond, later Buddle Richmond Weir, for 15 years, establishing a reputation as a first-class adviser, particularly in matters of commercial law.

Richmond was appointed a judge of the New Zealand Supreme Court in 1960, and then the New Zealand Court of Appeal in 1972, and in the following year, he became a Privy Counsellor on the Judicial Committee. He was president of the Court of Appeal from 1976 until his retirement in 1981.

In the 1972 Queen's Birthday Honours, Richmond was appointed a Knight Bachelor, for outstanding services to the law, and he was made a Knight Commander of the Order of the British Empire in the 1977 Queen's Silver Jubilee and Birthday Honours. In 2014, Richmond Chambers, a set of barristers based in Auckland, was named in his honour.
