= Richmond Cottage =

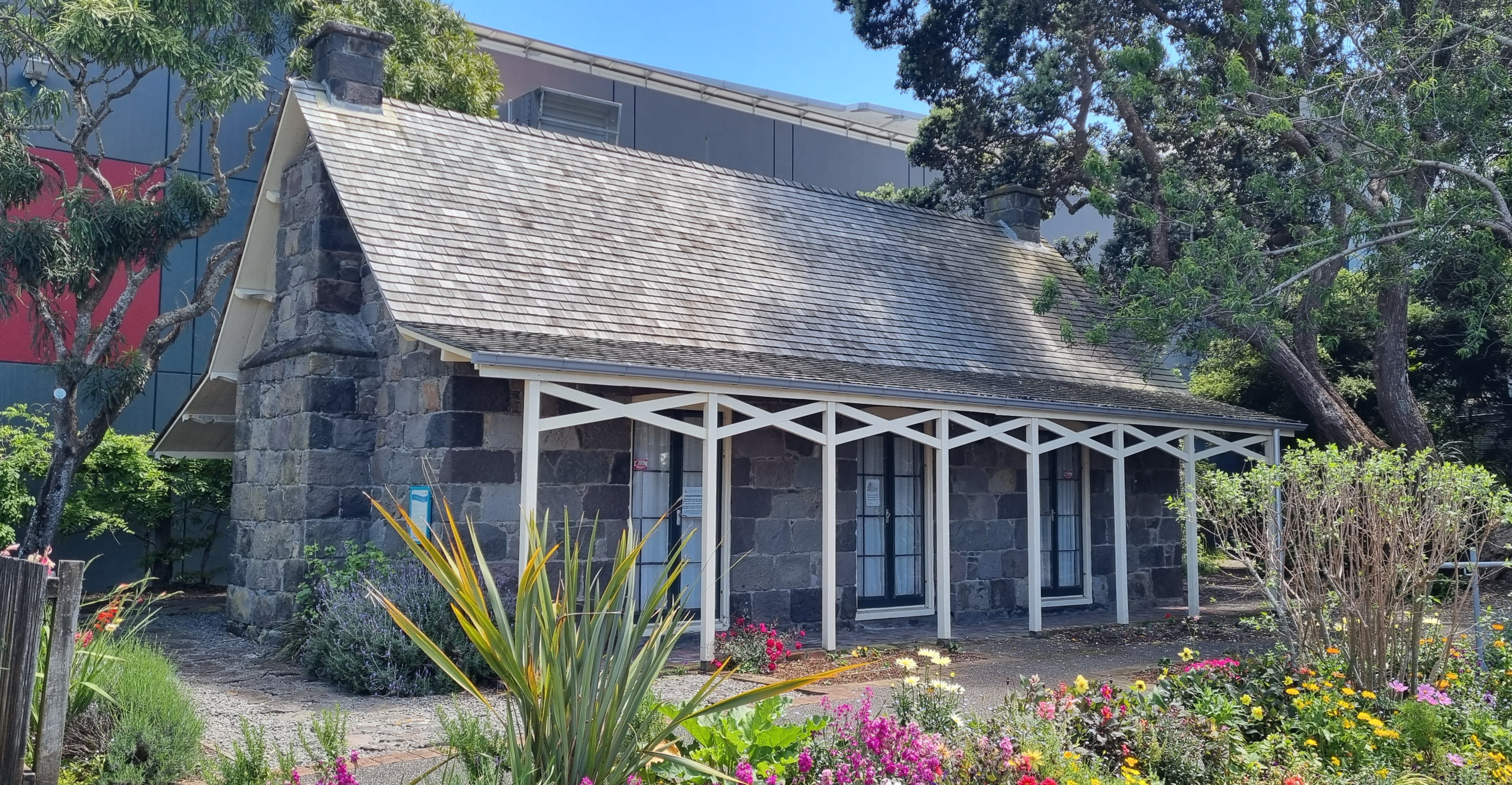
- Richmond Cottage, New Plymouth
- Interactive map of the Richmond Cottage area
- Former names: Beach Cottage

General information
- Location: 14 Ariki Street, New Plymouth Central, New Plymouth, New Zealand
- Coordinates: 39.057023°S 174.072342°E
- Construction started: 1853
- Completed: 1854

Technical details
- Material: Stone (Andesite)

Heritage New Zealand – Category 1
- Designated: 8 August 1993
- Reference no.: 7088

Richmond Cottage from New Plymouth, New Zealand, a typical residence of the first Taranaki settlers, is one of the heritage buildings of the city, registered by Heritage New Zealand as a Category 1 Historic Place.

The building is an early pioneering cottage, associated with the initial period of European settlement in New Plymouth. It was deconstructed from its original location and moved to the present site, next to the library and museum building, in 1961, consequently becoming a colonial museum that opened to the public in 1963.

== History ==
With the signing of the Treaty of Waitangi on 6 February 1840 and the declaration of sovereignty from 21 May 1840, the number of immigrants to New Zealand, particularly from the United Kingdom, began to increase. New Plymouth was chosen by Frederic Alonzo Carrington, the 32-year-old Chief Surveyor for the Plymouth Company, as the site for New Zealand's second European colony.

The Beach Cottage as it was then known due to its originally seaside location, overlooked the sea in St Aubyn Street, near the present Richmond Estate apartments. Very likely designed by Henry Richmond and Arthur Atkinson themselves, the cottage was built in 1853-1854 as a “town house” for the Richmond and Atkinson families, some of the earliest settlers who arrived in New Plymouth in 1853. Henry Richmond and Arthur Atkinson were also responsible for the woodwork, which was rimu; the stonework was done by a local stonemason, Nathaniel Hooke.

Christopher William and Emily (née Atkinson) Richmond were the first to live here until they moved to Auckland in 1856. Later, other members of the Richmond-Atkinson families used the cottage. After the beginning of the Taranaki Wars in 1860, New Plymouth was transformed into a fortified garrison town. Arthur and Jane Maria Atkinson moved here from the Hurworth Cottage, which was outside of the town's entrenchments. They intended to add two more bedrooms to the cottage, “built on moveable principles”, so that they could eventually take them back to the Hurworth cottage. The Atkinsons remained at Beach Cottage while Arthur was variously engaged as bush ranger, editor and co-proprietor of the Taranaki Herald, and as a member of the Provincial Council and General Assembly.

During the 1870s, Henry Richmond, concerned about children's education, began a private school at the Beach Cottage.

Starting during the 1880s, the house was used by the adjoining Railway Terminus Hotel, as either guest or staff accommodation. When the construction of the Tasman Hotel (now Richmond Estate) started in the early 1960s, the cottage was deconstructed and moved to its present site next to the library and museum building.

The Richmond Cottage was officially re-opened in 1963 by Henry Richmond's son, Howard Parris Richmond, who was born in the cottage in 1878. Consequently, the cottage became a colonial museum that opened to the public in 1963.

The cottage was renovated in 2017, when the shingles on its roof were replaced, and the interior was refreshed as well.

== Image gallery ==
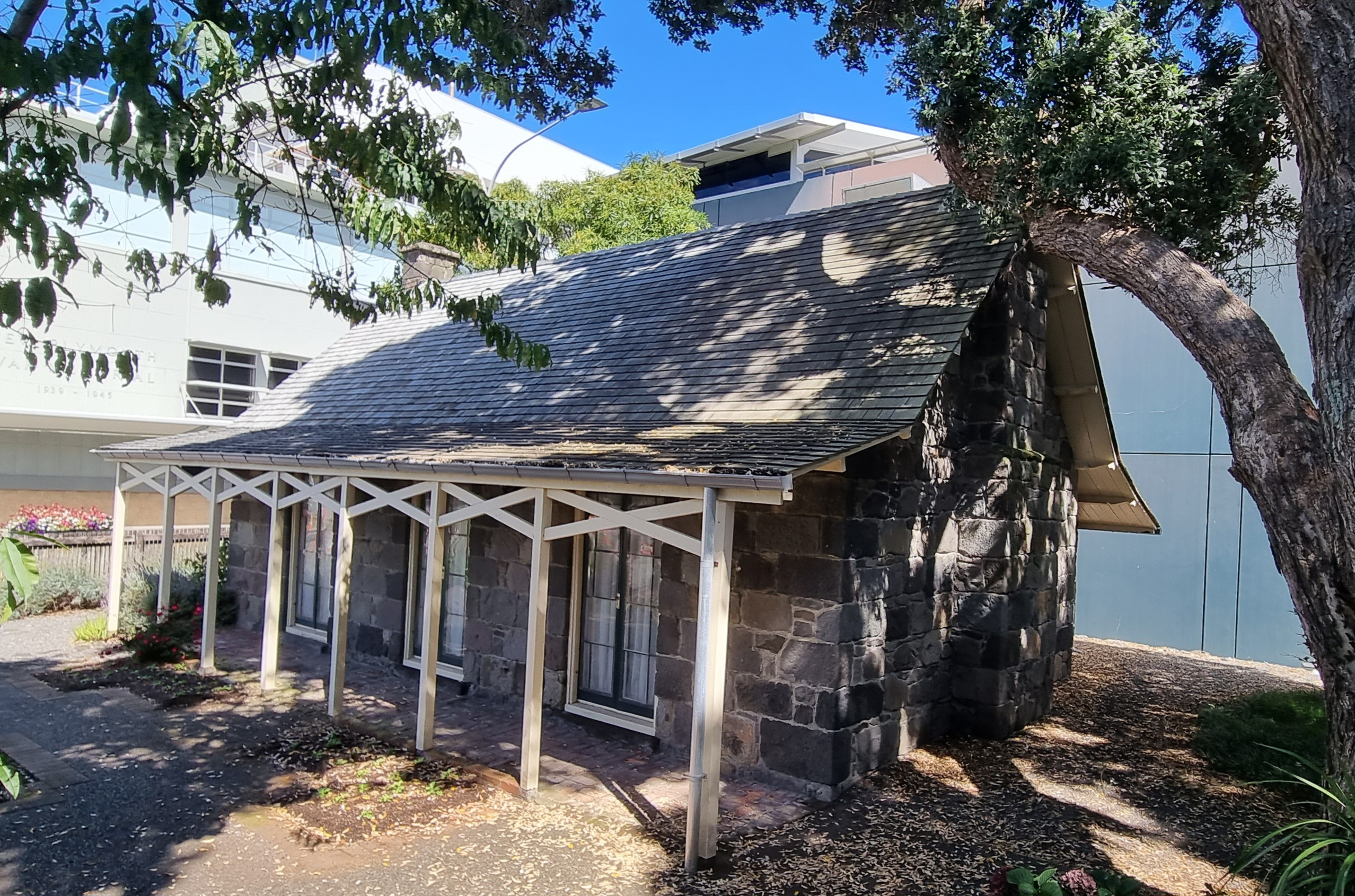
Richmond Cottage

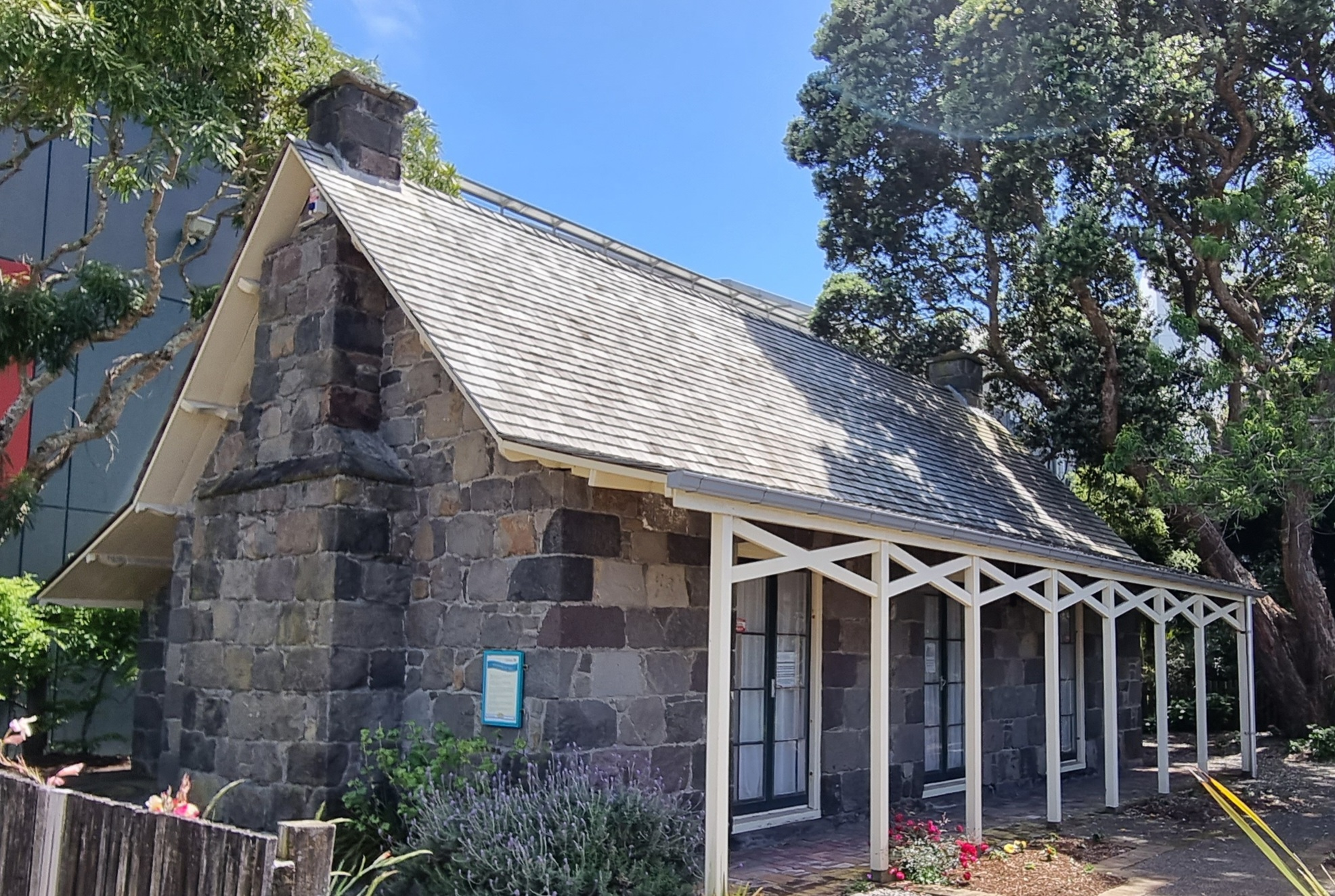
Richmond Cottage, south side

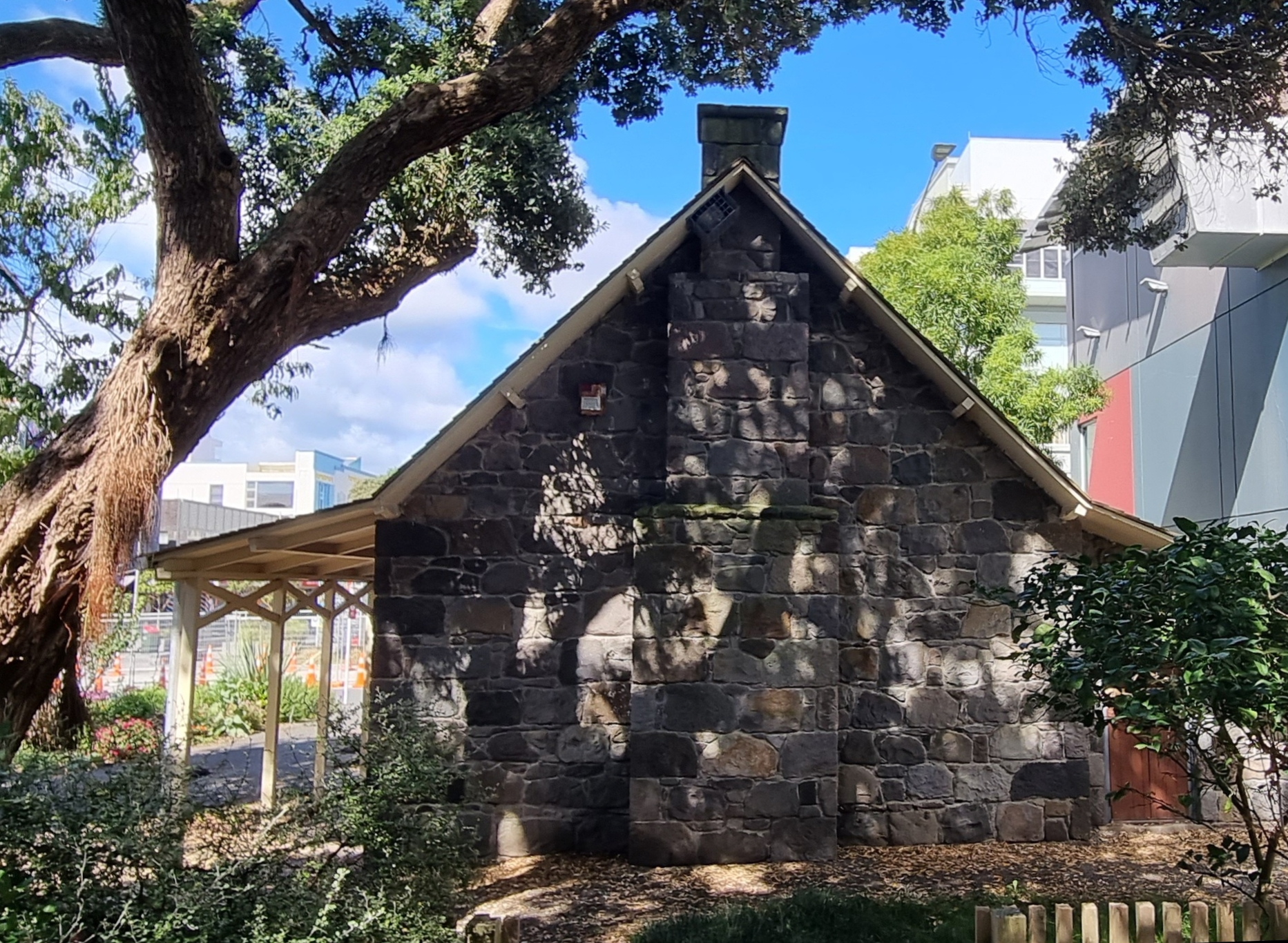
Richmond Cottage, north side

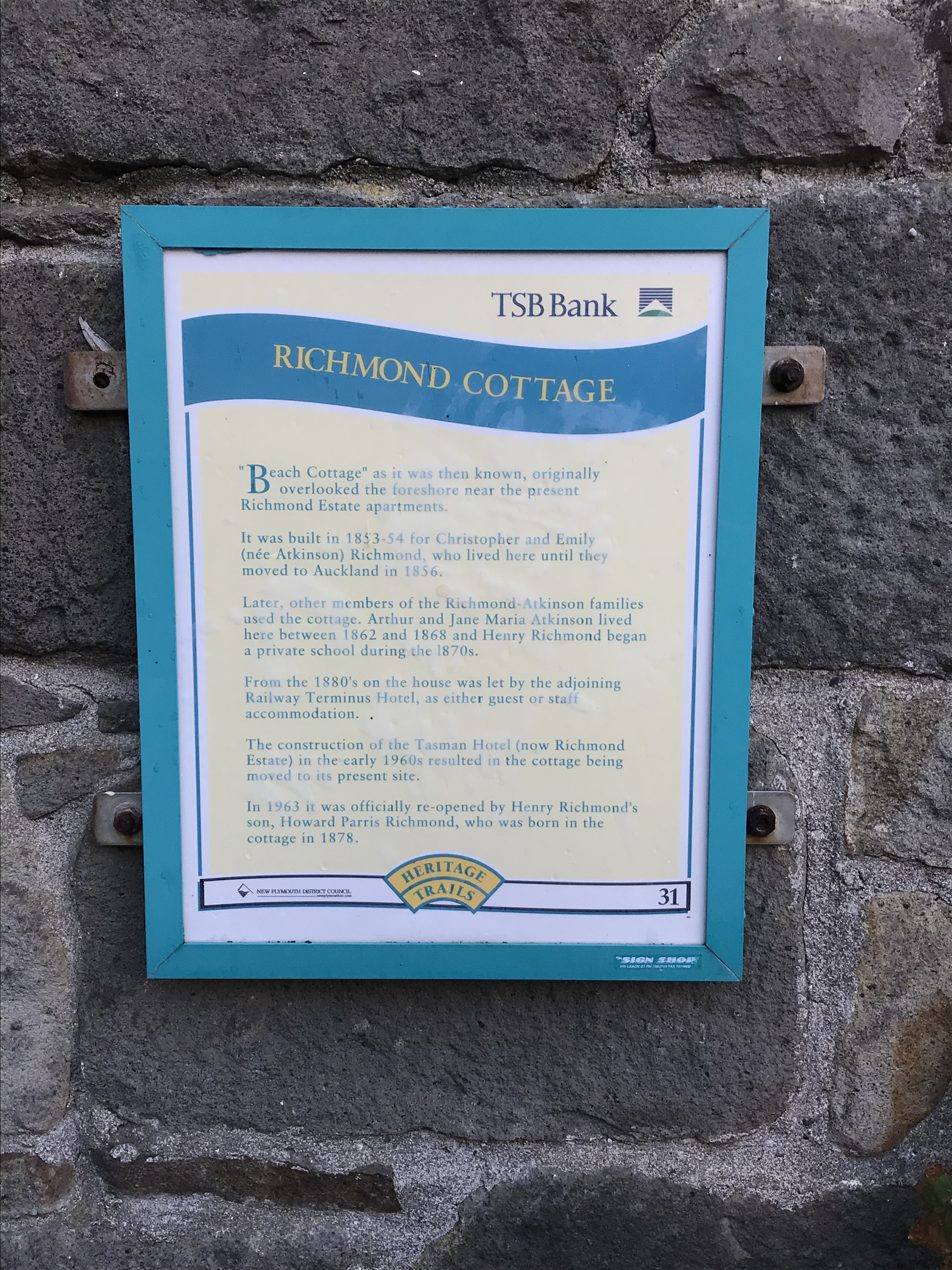
Richmond Cottage memorial plaque

== Bibliography ==
- Heritage New Zealand, New Zealand Heritage List
- Porter, Frances; Historic Buildings of New Zealand: North Island, New Zealand Historic Places Trust, Auckland, N.Z., Methuen, 1983, ISBN 0456031103
