= Hurworth Cottage =

Historic cottage in New Zealand

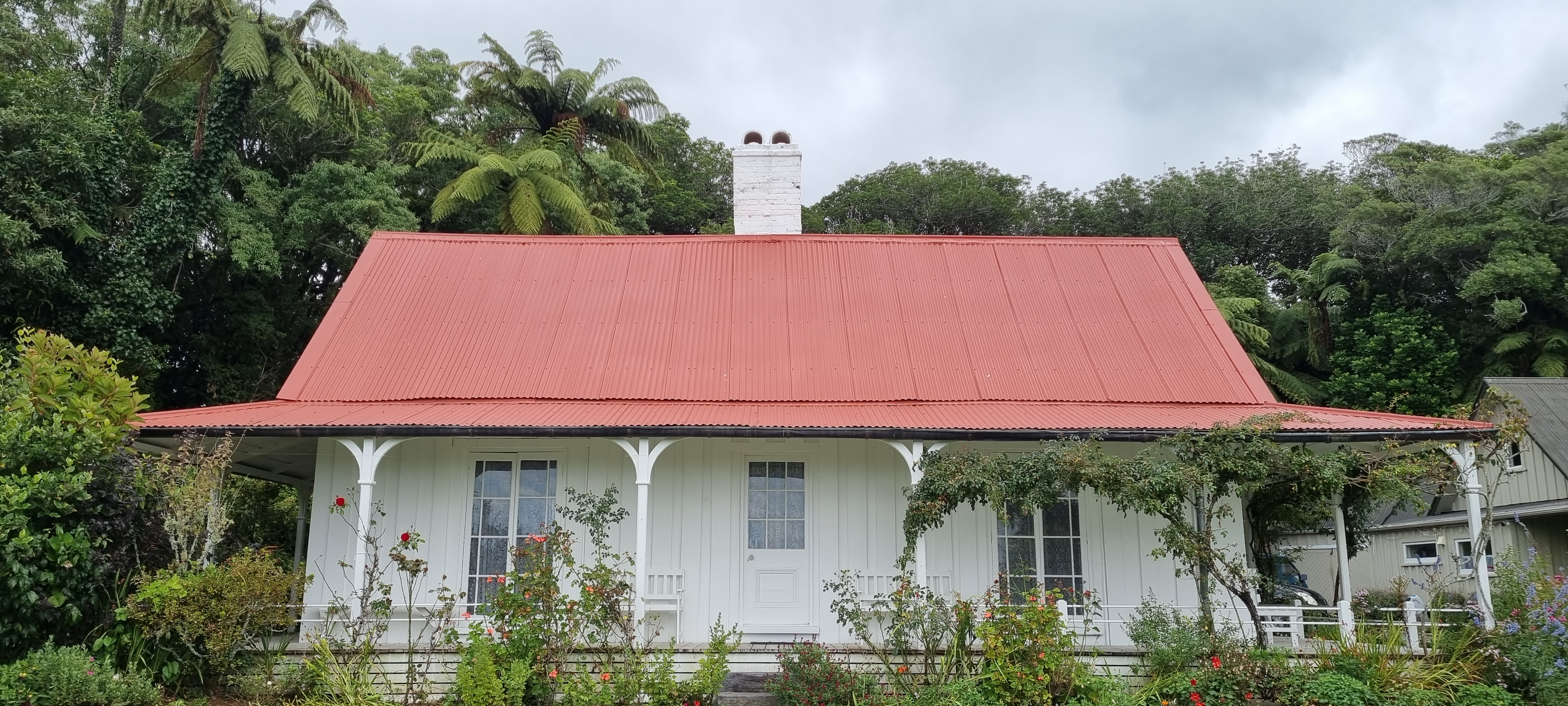
- Hurworth
- Interactive map of the Hurworth Cottage area

General information
- Location: 906 Carrington Road, Hurworth, New Zealand
- Coordinates: 39.129549°S 174.070021°E
- Construction started: 1855
- Completed: 1856
- Owner: Heritage New Zealand

Technical details
- Material: timber

Heritage New Zealand – Category 1
- Designated: 6 June 1983
- Reference no.: 144

Hurworth Cottage was the first homestead of Harry Atkinson, an early European settler in New Plymouth who went on to become a four-time Premier of New Zealand.

Hurworth Cottage, the sole surviving home from the 1850s settlement after the Taranaki Wars retains many characteristic Colonial construction features.

In 1967 the cottage was donated to the New Zealand Historic Places Trust, which restored it to its original size and appearance. It is registered by Heritage New Zealand as a Category 1 heritage building.

== History ==
Harry Atkinson arrived in the New Plymouth area with a large family group in 1853. Among them was his brother Arthur Atkinson and other members of the Richmond and Hursthouse families, calling themselves "the Mob". Harry and Arthur Atkinson each bought a 200 acres (80 hectares) of farmland on Carrington road, just outside New Plymouth and started to clear the bush to build a house. The building work started in 1854, simultaneously with a "town house" in central New Plymouth, called Beach House. At Hurworth, Atkinson cut the wood for the cottage himself and by the end of 1856 the basic cottage was completed. It was named "Hurworth" after a village in England where the Atkinson brothers had lived as boys, although, as their father worked as an itinerant builder and architect, the family did not settle anywhere.

Harry married in March 1856 Amelia Jane Skinner and settled together into their new home. There they created orchards, vegetable gardens, beehives, an aviary, a cow barn and dairy. Soon they started to sell produce from the Hurworth farming enterprises at a store in New Plymouth.

During the Taranaki Wars of 1860–1861, Hurworth, which was outside of the town's entrenchments, was evacuated for the relative safety of New Plymouth, which was transformed into a fortified garrison town.

At the end of the hostilities, Atkinson returned to farming at Hurworth. After the death of his wife in 1865, he left politics and returned to Hurworth. In 1867, he married his cousin Annie. The same year, he was back in Parliament, and was Prime Minister at various times after that. Most of the time during his political career he lived in Wellington, away from Hurworth, but he returned there as often as he could.

Hurworth underwent many additions to cope with a large family, and to house his cadets. The interiors were re-decorated, a dining room and a sitting room were added as well. The roof was re-shingled several times, for the last time in 1874, and thereafter shingles were replaced by corrugated iron in 1878. After Harry Atkinson died in 1892, the property passed through various hands.

In 1967 the house was donated to the Historic Places Trust. After taking possession of the house, the Trust restored Hurworth to the original look, removing all the late additions and uncovering also charcoal graffiti from the war period scrawled on the walls. After the restoration, Hurworth cottage was open to the public by Prime Minister Robert Muldoon in 1967.

== Description ==
The small rectangular cottage is a typical example of the early settler's dwellings in New Plymouth. It is simple, clad in vertical pit sawn board and batten, with a characteristic Colonial-style pitched roof. It has three small rooms downstairs, a stone chimney, ladder access to an upper level and French doors opening onto a veranda.

All the rooms are furnished with period pieces, artwork and mementoes associated with the Atkinson family.

The cottage and garden is for tours and garden hire by prior arrangement only.

== Image gallery ==
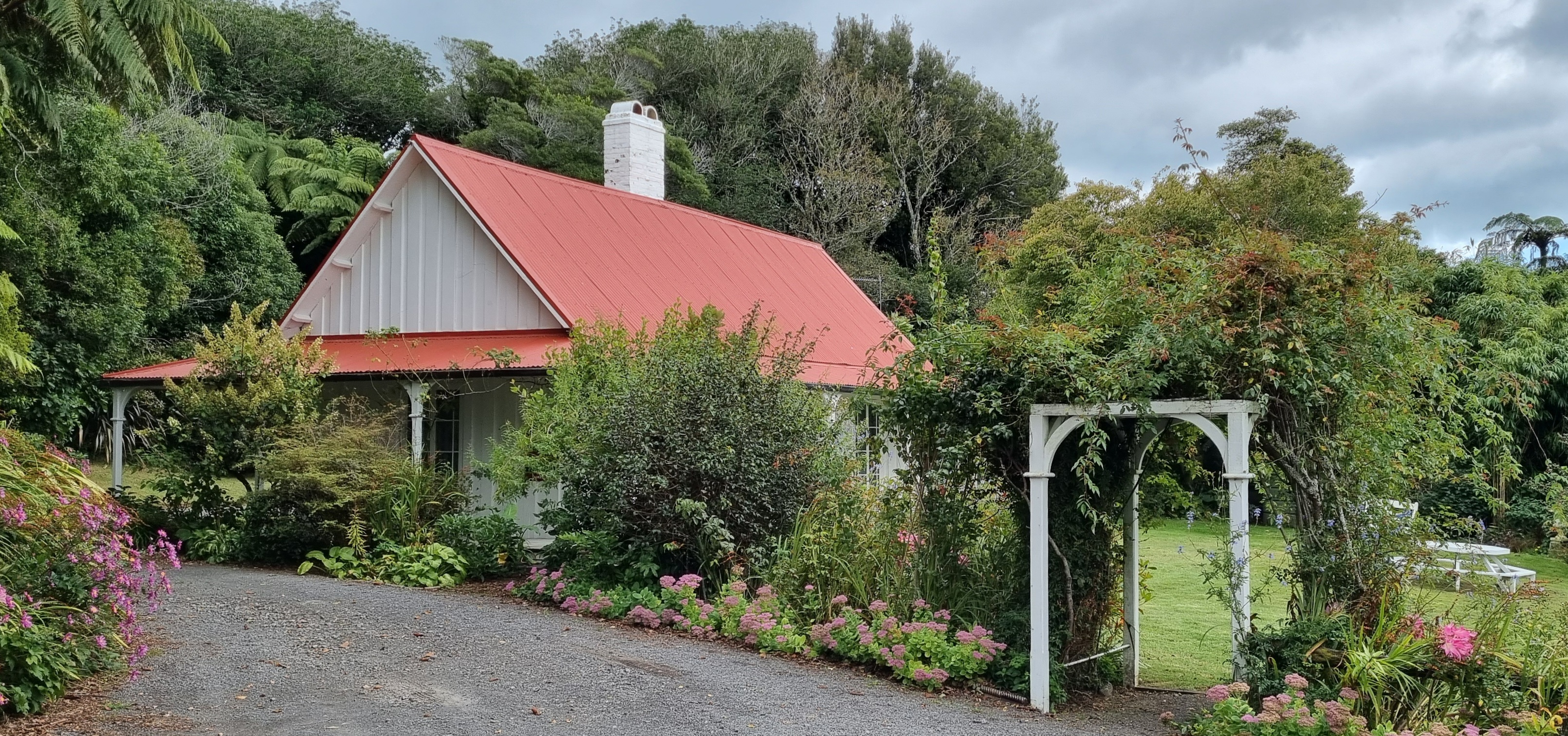
Hurworth Cottage

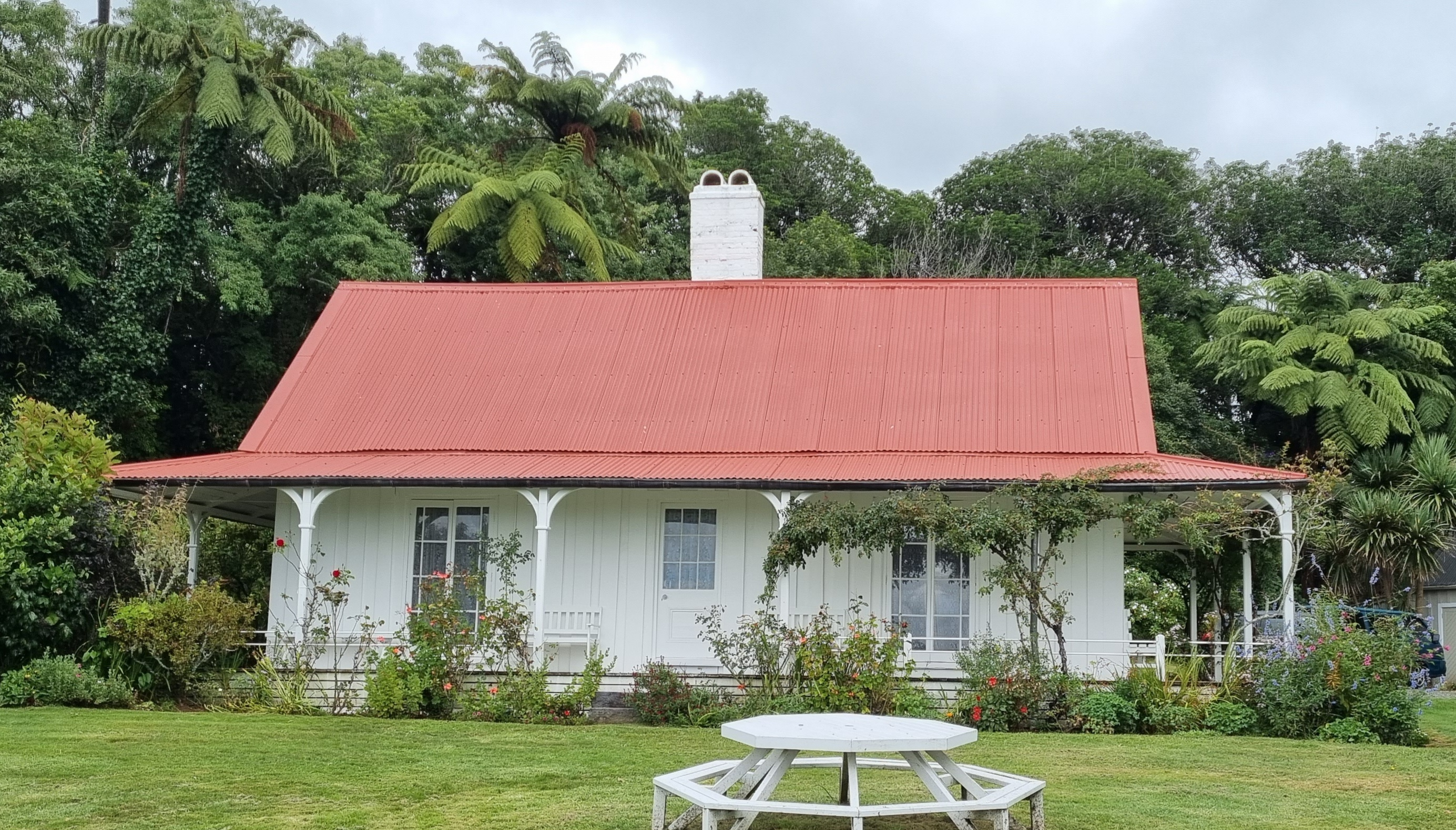
Hurworth Cottage, east side

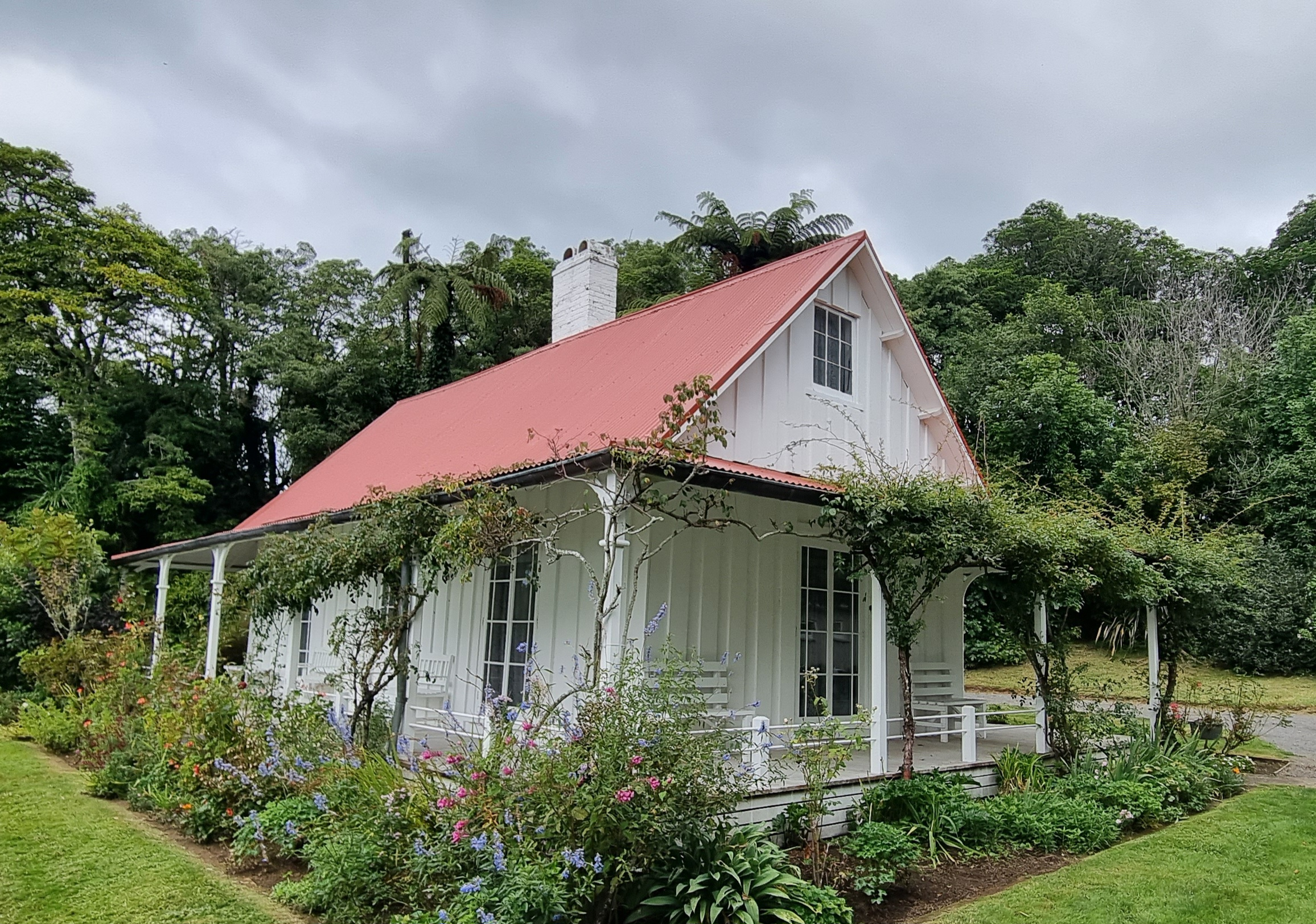
Hurworth Cottage, north side

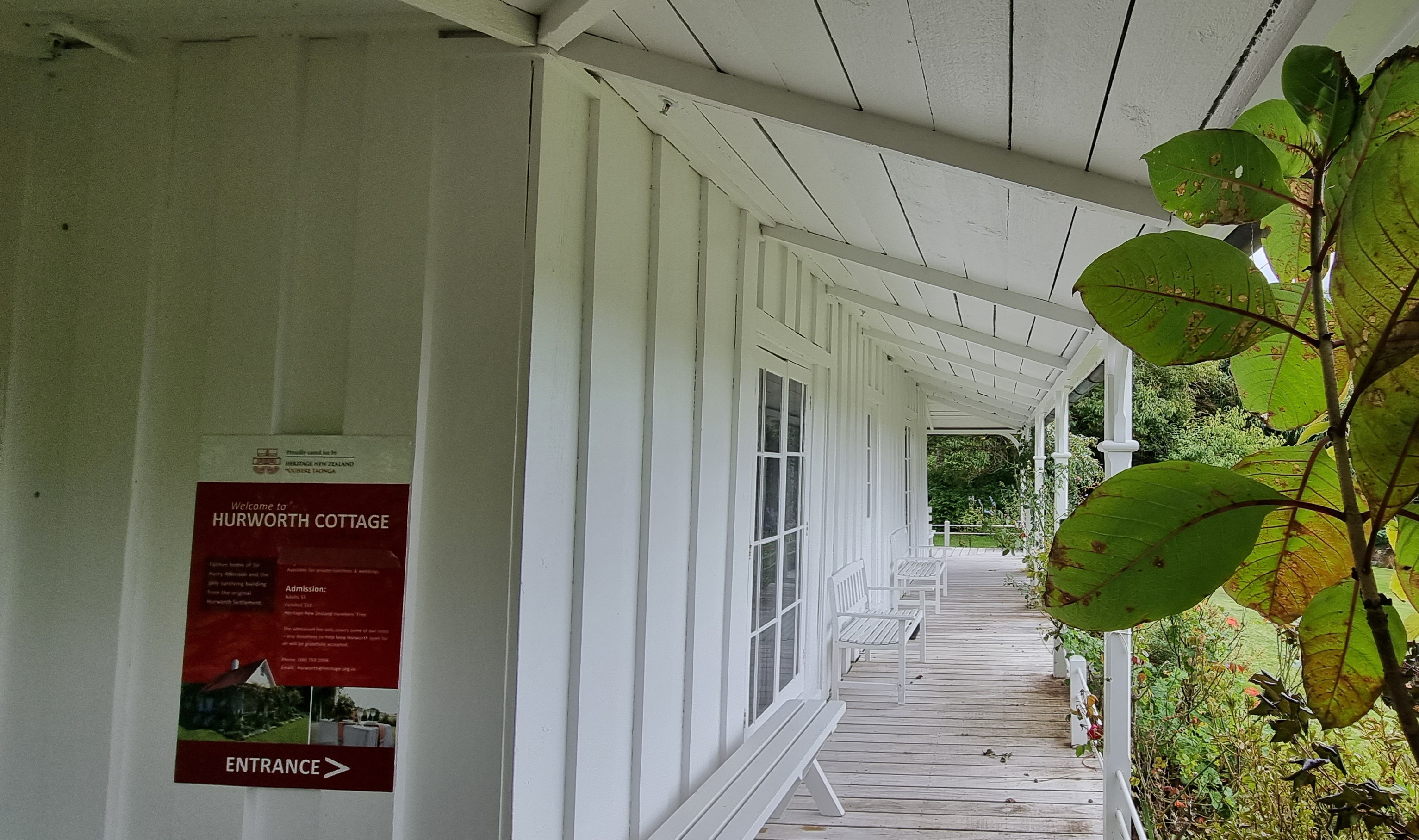
Hurworth Cottage, veranda

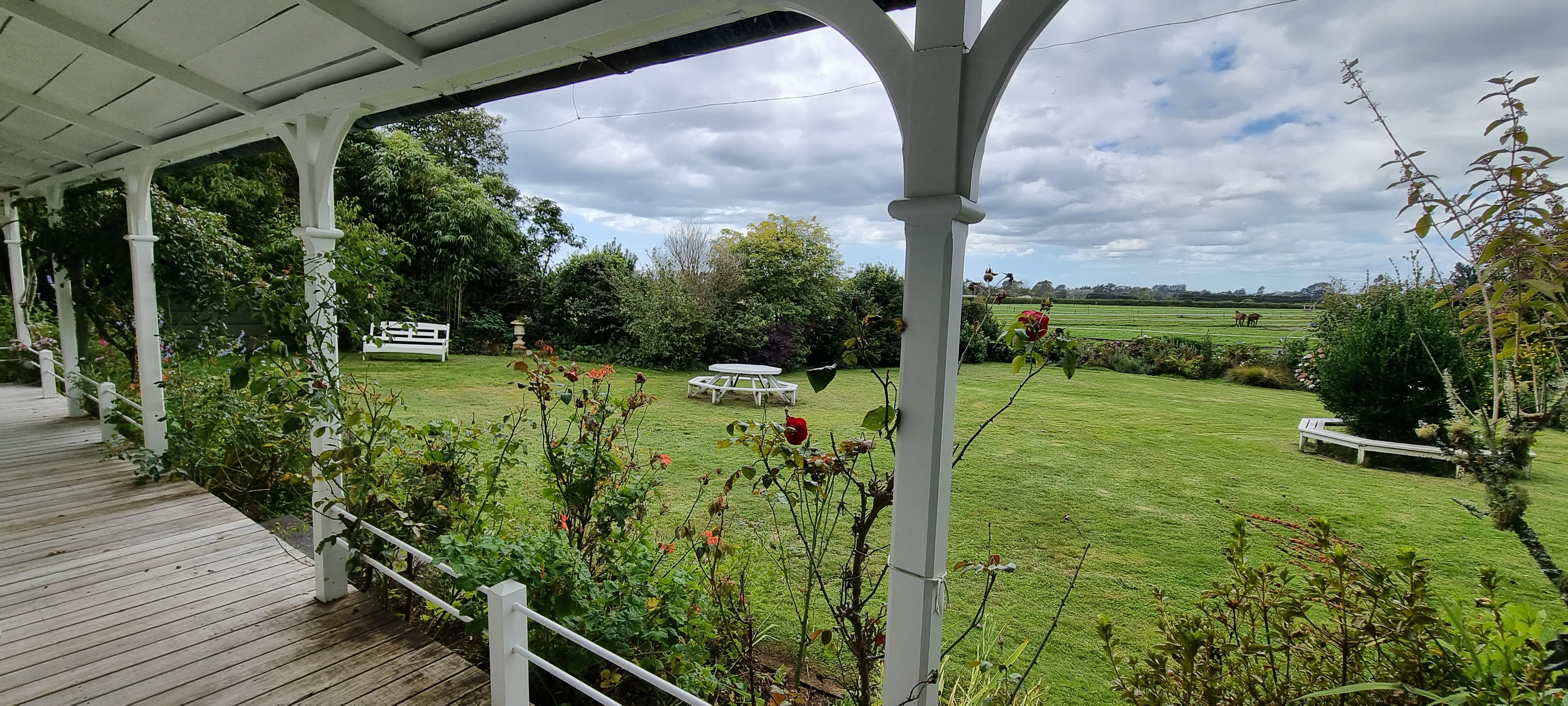
Hurworth Cottage, the garden

== Bibliography ==
- Heritage New Zealand, New Zealand Heritage List
- Porter, Frances; Historic Buildings of New Zealand: North Island, New Zealand Historic Places Trust, Auckland, N.Z., Methuen, 1983, ISBN 0456031103
