= How'm I Gonna Sleep =

1989 single by Tim Finn

Single by Tim Finn

from the album Tim Finn
- Released: March 1989
- Studio: Festival Studios, Sydney
- Genre: Pop
- Length: 4:14
- Label: Mushroom Records
- Songwriter(s): Tim Finn
- Producer(s): Mitchell Froom

Tim Finn singles chronology
"With You I'm Alive" (1987)	"How'm I Gonna Sleep" (1989)	"Parihaka" (1989)

"How'm I Gonna Sleep" is a song by New Zealand musician, Tim Finn, released in March 1989 as the lead single from his third studio album, Tim Finn. The song reached number 2 on the New Zealand charts and number 27 in Australia.

== Track listing ==
Australian/New Zealand 7" single (CP 2201)

- A. "How'm I Gonna Sleep" - 3:54
- B. "Cruel Black Crow" - 4:02

Australian/New Zealand CD single (CDED 409)

1. "How'm I Gonna Sleep" - 3:54
2. "Cruel Black Crow" - 4:02
3. "Six Months in a Leaky Boat" (live) (featuring Neil Finn) - 2:55

== Charts ==
Chart (1989)	Peak position
Australia (ARIA)	27
New Zealand (Recorded Music NZ)	2
