= Parihaka (song) =

1989 single by Tim Finn and Herbs

Single by Tim Finn featuring Herbs

from the album Tim Finn
- B-side: "Parihaka"
- Released: June 1989 (New Zealand)
- Recorded: 1989, Airforce Recording Studios, Auckland
- Genre: Pop
- Label: EMI New Zealand
- Songwriter: Tim Finn
- Producers: Tim Finn and Nick Morgan

Tim Finn singles chronology
"How'm I Gonna Sleep" (1989)	"Parihaka" (1989)	"Crescendo" (1989)

Herbs singles chronology
"No Nukes (The Second Letter)" (1989)	"Parihaka" (1989)	"Homegrown" (1991)

Music video
- "Parihaka" at NZ Film Archive

"Parihaka" is a song by New Zealand singer/songwriter Tim Finn featuring Herbs, released in June 1989 from the album Tim Finn. The song reached number 6 on the New Zealand charts.

== Background ==
The song tells the story of the Taranaki Parihaka peaceful protests. Finn was given a book on the topic (Dick Scott's Ask That Mountain) by his sister and told to write a song about it.

== Music video ==
The video was shot by New Zealand director Fane Flaws and notably shot in Auckland Art Gallery with several paintings by iconic New Zealand painter Colin McCahon. Flaws found out later that he had only been given clearance to use one painting in the video.

== Alternate versions ==
The original version of the song features Finn only and was recorded in 1988 in the US during production for the Tim Finn album. The single version features Herbs as vocalists and was recorded in 1989 on Finn's return to New Zealand.

== Charts ==
Chart (1989)	Peak position
New Zealand (Recorded Music NZ)	6
