= Tohu Kākahi =

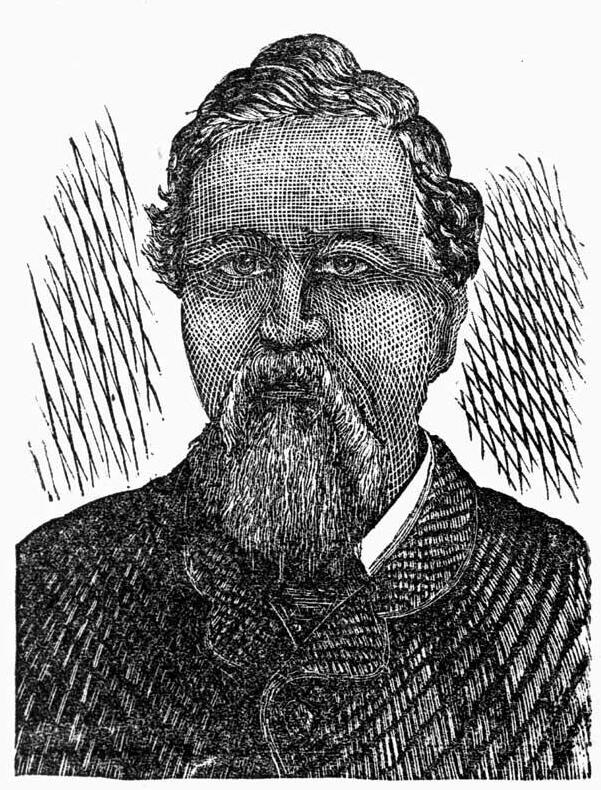
- 1883 wood engraving of Tohu Kākahi by John P. Ward
- Born: c. 22 January 1828; Puketapu, Ngāti Kahungunu territory
- Died: 4 February 1907 (aged 79); Parihaka, New Zealand

Tohu Kākahi (c. 22 January 1828 – 4 February 1907) was a Māori leader, a warrior leader in the anti-government Hauhau movement and later a prophet at Parihaka, who along with Te Whiti o Rongomai organised passive resistance against the occupation of Taranaki in the 1870s in New Zealand.

Details of Tohu's early life are unclear. According to some descendants he was born at Puketapu on 22 January 1828, although other locations and dates have been claimed. He was regarded as a warrior, teacher and prophet and it is said Tohu confirmed Pōtatau Te Wherowhero's son Tāwhiao as the second Māori King, and was his spiritual adviser. In November 1861 Tohu captured Bishop Selwyn during his visit to Taranaki to see Tamihana Te Rauparaha. This and his later repeated attacks against the settlers and government as part of the violent Hau hau movement convinced the government they were dealing with a war like leader.

Along with other members of Te Āti Awa, Tohu fought in the Taranaki Wars in the mid-1860s and was one of the leaders at the 1864 attack at Sentry Hill. He was a Hauhau leader during the June 1865 attack at Te Puru and again later at Waikoukou in February 1866. The final defeat at Waikoukou marked the end of the Hauhau attempts to drive the settlers off the land by military action. Following these defeats, he joined his relative Te Whiti o Rongomai at Parihaka, south Taranaki in leading peaceful reoccupation of confiscation of Maori land. Although Tohu did not have the oratory skills of Te Whiti many Maori consider his mana to be equal to Te Whiti.

When the Waimate Plain was surveyed in 1879. Māori asserted their land rights to the confiscated land by removing survey pegs and by ploughing settlers farms and fencing across roads and settler claimed areas. Many arrests of the Māori ploughmen were made, but the campaign had support by other Maori, although the influential Tamihana Te Rauparaha consistently sided with the government. In 1881 when Te Whiti gave a warlike speech at Parihaka, it was Tohu who restrained him from violence. In November 1881 the village of Parihaka was occupied by government troops and Tohu was arrested along with Te Whiti and hundreds of others.

Tohu and Te Whiti were charged with "wickedly, maliciously, and seditiously contriving and intending to disturb the peace" and tried in Otago 10 June 1882. Tohu was released in 1883 and returned to Parihaka but the arrests and dispersion had reduced the population and importance of Parihaka. Tohu continued to advocate traditional Māori values, and opposed alcohol and European influences at Parihaka until his death in 1907.
