= Emma Jane Richmond =

New Zealand community and religious worker

- Born: Emma Jane Parris; 1845; New Plymouth, New Zealand
- Died: 9 October 1921 (aged 76); Havelock North, New Zealand
- Known for: Pioneer of anthroposophy in New Zealand
- Spouse: Henry Richmond (m. 1868; died 1890)
- Relatives: Robert Parris (father); Clifford Richmond (grandson); James Crowe Richmond (brother-in-law); William Richmond (brother-in-law); Jane Maria Atkinson (sister-in-law)

Emma Jane Richmond (née Parris, 1845 – 9 October 1921) was a New Zealand community and religious worker. She was a pioneer of anthroposophy in New Zealand.

== Early life and family ==
Born in New Plymouth in 1845, Richmond was the daughter of Robert Reid Parris and his wife, Mary Whitmore, who had arrived in New Zealand in November 1842. Raised as an Anglican with a liberal interpretation of doctrine, she read widely and was active in musical pastimes as a young woman.

She married Henry Richmond at St Mary's church, New Plymouth, on 15 July 1868. Henry Richmond was a Unitarian and a widower, his first wife, Mary Blanche Hursthouse having died in 1864. Emma became stepmother to his two surviving children. The couple went on to have three children of their own, before Henry died in 1890.

== Community and religious activities ==
In 1886, Richmond became the first woman elected as a member of the Taranaki Education Board, and she was prominent in seeking the abolition of corporal punishment of girls. She was chair of the Ladies' Visiting Committee, which observed the management of New Plymouth hospital from 1886, and was the first woman elected to the Taranaki Hospital Board. Richmond was interested in the treatment of female prison inmates, and for many years was an official visitor of jails nationally.

It is thought that Richmond probably first encountered theosophical ideas during family discussions within the Atkinson–Richmond extended family, but it is known that she was a member of the Christchurch branch of the Theosophical Society in 1894, and was its president by 1897. Richmond became president of the Wellington branch of the Theosophical Society after moving to that city in 1900, and served in that capacity for three years, giving over 60 public lectures. She was elected president of the sixth annual convention of the New Zealand Theosophical Society in 1901.

In 1904, Richmond and her daughter, Beatrice, visited London, where they encountered anthroposophy and the ideas of Rudolf Steiner, and Richmond arranged for translations of Steiner's lectures to be sent to New Zealand. After returning to Wellington she continued to receive and distribute copies of Steiner's lectures in translation as well as some of his books. In about 1912, Richmond moved to Havelock North to live with her daughter and son-in-law, Rachel and Bernard Crompton-Smith, and she led an anthroposophical study group, which included Mabel Hodge, at their home.

== Death ==
Richmond died at Havelock North on 9 October 1921. Her funeral left St Paul's pro-cathedral in Wellington, and she was buried at Karori Cemetery.

== Legacy ==
After Richmond's death in 1921, the Crompton-Smiths took up the leadership of anthroposophy in New Zealand, eventually leading to the establishment of the Anthroposophical Society in New Zealand in 1933, and the country's first Rudolf Steiner school in Hastings in 1950.
