= Tim Finn (album) =

Studio album by Tim Finn
- Released: April 1989
- Genre: Pop
- Length: 40:16
- Label: Capitol
- Producer: Mitchell Froom

Tim Finn chronology
The Les Patterson Long Player (1987)	Tim Finn (1989)	Before & After (1993)

Singles from Tim Finn
- 1. "How'm I Gonna Sleep" Released: March 1989; 2. "Parihaka (ft. Herbs)" Released: June 1989; 3. "Crescendo" Released: July 1989; 4. "Not Even Close" Released: February 1990

Tim Finn is the third studio album by New Zealand singer/songwriter Tim Finn. The album was released in April 1989 and peaked at number 8 in New Zealand and number 47 in Australia.

== Critical reception ==
Professional ratings
Review scores
Source	Rating
Allmusic	4.5/5 stars
Record Mirror	4/5 stars

The reviewer in pan-European magazine Music & Media noted that the album "consists of 10 intelligent, well-crafted and introspective songs" and described Mitchell Froom's production as "pleasantly gritty and modest in a refined way".

== Track listing ==
All tracks are written by Tim Finn, except for "Young Mountain" by Finn and Mitchell Froom.

Side one
No.	Title	Length
1.	"Young Mountain"	4:18
2.	"Not Even Close"	4:19
3.	"How'm I Gonna Sleep"	3:56
4.	"Parihaka"	4:19
5.	"Tears Inside"	4:04
Total length:		20:56

Side two
No.	Title	Length
6.	"Birds Swim Fish Fly"	3:24
7.	"Suicide on Downing St."	3:32
8.	"Show a Little Mercy"	4:01
9.	"Crescendo"	4:17
10.	"Been There Done That"	4:06
Total length:		19:20 40:16

== Personnel ==
Personnel as listed in the album's liner notes are:

=== Musicians ===
- Tim Finn — vocals, guitar, keyboards
- Jerry Marotta — drums
- Tony Levin — bass guitar
- Alex Acuña — percussion
- David Rhodes, Tim Pierce — guitars
- Neil Finn — backing vocals, guitars
- Mitchell Froom — keyboards
- Noel Crombie — backing vocals
- The Heart Attack — horns

=== Production ===
- Mitchell Froom — production
- Tchad Blake, Mike Kloster — engineering

== Charts ==
Chart (1989)	Peak position
Australian Albums (ARIA)	47
New Zealand Albums (RMNZ)	8
