= Robert Parris (judge) =

New Zealand politician, public servant and judge (1816–1904)

- Born: Robert Reid Parris; 1816; Chard, Somerset, England
- Died: 18 September 1904 (aged 87–88); New Plymouth
- Occupations: school administrator; politician; public servant; interpreter; soldier; judge
- Spouse: Mary Whitmore (m. 1838)
- Relatives: Emma Jane Richmond (daughter)

Robert Reid Parris (1816 – 18 September 1904) was a New Zealand school administrator, politician, public servant, interpreter, soldier and judge.

== Life ==
He was born in Chard, Somerset, England in about 1816 and baptised on 16 May 1816. On 18 October 1838, he married Mary Whitmore at Colyton, Devon. They had two daughters before they emigrated to New Plymouth in New Zealand, and two daughters and a son after they arrived in the colony on 19 November 1842.

Unsuccessful at farming, he became farm manager at St John's College in Auckland for Bishop Selwyn. Parris was promoted to general superintendent of the industrial school. In about 1852, he moved back to New Plymouth. Parris was one of the original members of the New Plymouth Provincial Council, being elected on 20 August 1853 for the Grey and Bell electorate. He joined the Executive Council as Provincial Treasurer under George Cutfield from January to June 1857. He resigned from the provincial council in July 1857 when he was appointed district land purchase commissioner for the province. He joined the militia and was promoted captain in June 1863, and major in May 1865. Subsequently, he was best known as Major Parris. Fluent in Māori, he acted as an interpreter during the New Zealand Wars. He was appointed a judge in the Compensation Court in August 1866. He was later a judge in the Native Land Court.

== Death and funeral ==
He died at New Plymouth on 18 September 1904, and was survived by his wife by two years. He was given a military funeral at St Mary's Church.
