= Thomas Kynnersley =

New Zealand politician

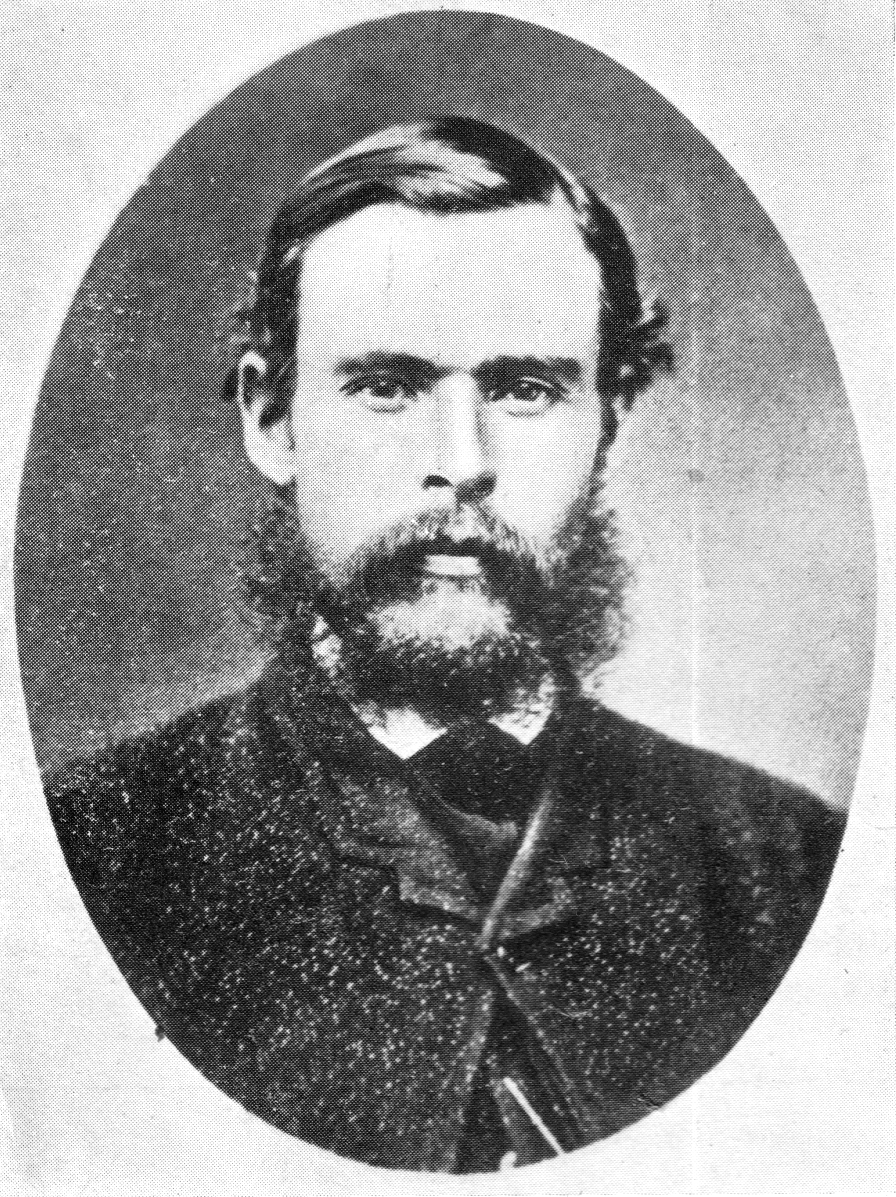

Personal details
- Born: Thomas Alfred Sneyd Kynnersley; 14 June 1839 Uttoxeter, England
- Died: 1 February 1874 (aged 34) Nelson, New Zealand
- Cause of death: tuberculosis
- Resting place: Wakapuaka Cemetery
- Known for: Gold field warden on the West Coast

Thomas Alfred Sneyd Kynnersley (14 June 1839 – 1 February 1874), who signed as T. A. Sneyd Kynnersley, was a 19th-century Member of Parliament from the West Coast, New Zealand.

== Early life ==
He was born in Uttoxeter in the West Midlands region of England, the son of Birmingham magistrate Thomas Clement Sneyd-Kynnersley and his wife, Eliza. Mary Palmer Kynnersley was his twin sister and Loxley Hall was the country house of the family.

== Goldfield warden ==
He retired from the navy due to ill health and settled in New Zealand at Pelorus Sound / Te Hoiere in the early 1860s. He was appointed warden for Pelorus gold fields in late 1864 and soon transferred to the West Coast during the West Coast gold rush. He was based at Cobden and controlled the area from the Grey River to Karamea in the north. On an exploration journey in early 1865 with Bill Fox and others, they found gold at the mouth of the Potikohua River (now known as Fox River). Kynnersley moved his residence north to Brighton (now known as Tirimoana at the mouth of the Fox River), then to Charleston at the Waitakere (Nile) River, and then to Westport. Kynnersley is described as a capable administrator, as popular and also daring. The Nelson provincial government appointed him chief warden and commissioner of the Nelson South West goldfield in January 1867.

Kynnersley had tuberculosis and because of ongoing sickness, he resigned from his positions at the end of 1868, going to Melbourne in January 1869. He spent some time in England and in a letter published in The London Times, he commented on Earl Granville's despatch (as Secretary of State for Foreign Affairs to Sir George Bowen as Governor of New Zealand). He returned on the Lincolnshire to Melbourne in November 1869 and arrived in New Zealand in February 1870 on the Tararua. He was offered and accepted the role as goldfield warden in the Wangapeka, where he was favourably received.

== Political career ==
New Zealand Parliament
Years	Term	Electorate	Party
1870	4th	Westland North	Independent

At the same time as becoming warden for Wangapeka, Kynnersley (alongside Arthur Collins) was appointed to the Executive of the Nelson Provincial Council by the province's Superintendent, John Perry Robinson. Collins and Kynnersley held their executive appointments from 15 March to 4 June 1870. Kynnersley's appointment proved controversial and Robinson was threatened with censure and a vote of no confidence. In this situation, Kynnersley chose to resign with effect of 4 June.

Simultaneously, a vacancy occurred in the Westland North parliamentary electorate through Timothy Gallagher's resignation and on 1 June 1860, Kynnersley advertised his candidacy. He stood as an independent, but supporting the Fox Ministry in their stance on the New Zealand War. He also advocated for the abolition of the provincial government system. Kynnersley was unopposed in the resulting 2 July by-election and represented the electorate until the dissolution of the 4th Parliament on 30 December, when he retired.
