= William Fox =

William Fox may refer to:

== Entertainment ==
- William Fox (producer) (1879–1952), founder of movie studio Fox Film Corporation
- William Fox (actor) (1911–2008), English comedy actor
- William Fox (born 1939), birth and early professional name of James Fox
- William Price Fox (1926–2015), American novelist and essayist
- William Fox (organist) (born 1995), English organist

== Politics ==
- William Foxe (1480–1554), MP for Ludlow
- William Fox (MP for City of York), 14th century Member of Parliament (MP) for City of York
- William Fox (pamphleteer) (fl. 1791–1794), abolitionist
- William Johnson Fox (1786–1864), British politician
- William Fox (New Zealand politician) (1812–1893), premier of New Zealand
- William H. Fox (1837–1913), Massachusetts lawyer, jurist, and politician
- Bill Fox (politician) (William Arthur Fox, 1899–1994), New Zealand Labour Party politician

== Sports ==
- William Fox (footballer), Irish international footballer active in the 1880s
- William Victor Fox (1898–1949), English footballer and cricketer
- William Fox (wrestler) (1912–1999), English freestyle sport wrestler
- Bill Fox (baseball) (William Henry Fox, 1872–1946), Major League Baseball infielder
- Billy Fox (boxer) (William McKinley Fox, 1926–1986), American light heavyweight boxer

== Other ==
- William Fox (fl. 17th century), Paymaster of the Forces of England
- William Fox (pirate) (fl. 1717–1723), English pirate in the Caribbean
- William Fox (deacon) (1736–1826), founder of the Sunday School Society
- William Darwin Fox (1805–1880), English clergyman and amateur scientist
- William Fox (palaeontologist) (1813–1881), English clergyman and palaeontologist
- William Tilbury Fox (1836–1879), English dermatologist
- William R. Fox (1837–1888), American soldier and Medal of Honor recipient
- William F. Fox (1840–1909), American forester, author, member of 28th Regiment United States Colored Troops
- William J. Fox (1897–1993), American military officer, engineer, and charro
- William T. R. Fox (1912–1988), American professor of foreign policy at Columbia University
- William Sherwood Fox (1878–1967), Canadian classical scholar
- Bill Fox (goldminer) (William Fox, 1827–1890), New Zealand gold prospector and miner
- Ngataua Omahuru (c. 1863–1918), Māori lawyer, also known as William Fox

== See also ==
- Bill Fox (disambiguation)
- Billy Fox (disambiguation)
- Henry Fox Talbot (William Henry Fox Talbot, 1800–1877), pioneer of photography
- William Fox-Pitt (born 1969), British eventing rider
- William Fox-Strangways, 4th Earl of Ilchester (1795–1865), British diplomat, nobleman and Whig politician
