= 1870 Westland North by-election =

New Zealand by-election

- 2 July 1870
Candidate	Thomas Kynnersley
Party	Independent
MP before election
Timothy Gallagher
Independent
Elected MP
Thomas Kynnersley
Independent

The 1870 Westland North by-election was a by-election held on 2 July 1870 during the 4th New Zealand Parliament in the West Coast electorate of Westland North. Timothy Gallagher had resigned and Thomas Kynnersley was returned unopposed.

== Cause of by-election ==
The by-election was caused by the resignation of the incumbent MP Timothy Gallagher on 13 May 1870 over urgent and private business affairs.

== Potential candidates ==
The three provincial councillors from the area were immediately mooted as potential candidates plus a newly-appointed member of the provincial executive. The councillors were Eugene O'Conor of Westport (representing the Buller electorate), George Donne of Charleston (representing the Charleston electorate), and William Franklyn of the Grey (representing the Grey electorate). The executive member was Thomas Kynnersley, who had previously been goldfields warden on the West Coast and had just been appointed as warden to the Wangapeka. In the Provincial Council, there was conflict between Donne and O'Conor over the latter having received a requisition from the Charleston, the home town of Donne. Another potential candidate, Lowther Broad from Charleston, was mentioned by The Charleston Herald.

Franklyn had only just, on 5 May, been elected to the provincial council. When, just days later, Kynnersley returned to New Zealand, Franklyn resigned to make room for Kynnersley's appointment to the provincial executive. When it was found that the resignation was not necessary, Franklyn withdrew it. Over unrelated conduct issues, other members forced the resignation to be accepted. Franklyn received negative publicity over the affair and received a hostile reception at the provincial by-election nomination meeting. Three days prior to the provincial by-election, Franklyn withdrew, stating that he was "heartily sick of politics". Consequently, nothing further was heard from or about him in relation to the parliamentary by-election.

On 4 June, the Grey River Argus reported that Kynnersley had resolved to stand in Westland North. On 7 June, he advertised his candidacy in The Westport Times. Donne and O'Conor were still discussed as potential candidates at that point. On 18 June, it was reported that O'Conor had received a strong requisition but he did not come forward as a candidate.

== Writ and election arrangements ==
The government at the time, led by William Fox, was opposed to the abolition of the provincial government system. There were strong calls from gold fields areas for abolition as it was felt that insufficient money was spent in the areas where much of the taxation was collected. It could therefore be expected that the person to be returned in Westland North would not be a government supporter. In this context, the editor of The Westport Times speculated that the government was deliberately delaying the issuing of a writ for the by-election so that by the time a new candidate had been chosen, the current session of the government would be over and the next general election would be called.

The writ, dated 9 June, was advertised with a date of 22 June by the returning officer. The advertisement appeared in The Westport Times on 28 June. (Note: The 23 and 25 June 1870 editions of The Westport Times are missing on Papers Past and it is therefore possible that the advertisement ran earlier than 28 June.) The nomination meeting was set for Saturday, 2 July, and the polling day for 9 July. Ten polling places were stipulated as such:

- Courthouse in Westport (the principal polling place)
- Isaac Chapman's Store, Giles Township
- Old Courthouse in Addison
- Courthouse in Charleston
- Courthouse in Brighton
- Courthouse in Cobden
- Police Camp in Ahaura
- Courthouse in Camptown
- Courthouse in Wangapeka
- Warden's Office, Matakitaki

== Election meetings ==
Kynnersley, who had been in Nelson as the provincial council was in session, arrived in Greymouth on 20 June to start a speaking tour of the electorate. On 21 June, he spoke in Cobden at a poorly-attended meeting. On 27 June, Kynnersley left Greymouth on the Murray for Westport, where he arrived the following day after having encountered terrible weather and sea. On 29 June, he spoke to some 200 electors in Charleston. On 1 July, he spoke in Westport at a well-attended meeting.

== Nomination meeting ==
The nomination meeting for the by-election was held at 12 noon on 2 July 1870 at the Westport Courthouse. Dr Joseph Giles (1832–1930) was the returning officer. As Kynnersley was the only person proposed for election, the Dr Giles declared him elected unopposed.

== Subsequent matters ==
Kynnersley made his way to Wellington and took his seat at parliament on 12 July. The session was prorogued on 13 September 1870, which ended the 4th New Zealand Parliament. Prior to the 1871 general election, Kynnersley announced that he would not make himself available for re-election.

== Citations ==
- Scholefield, Guy (1950) [First published in 1913]. New Zealand Parliamentary Record, 1840–1949 (3rd ed.). Wellington: Govt. Printer.
- Wilson, Jim (1985) [First published in 1913]. New Zealand Parliamentary Record, 1840–1984 (4th ed.). Wellington: V.R. Ward, Govt. Printer. OCLC 154283103.
