= Macclesfield Sunday School =

Building in Macclesfield, Cheshire, England

Coordinates: 53°15′29″N 2°07′40″W

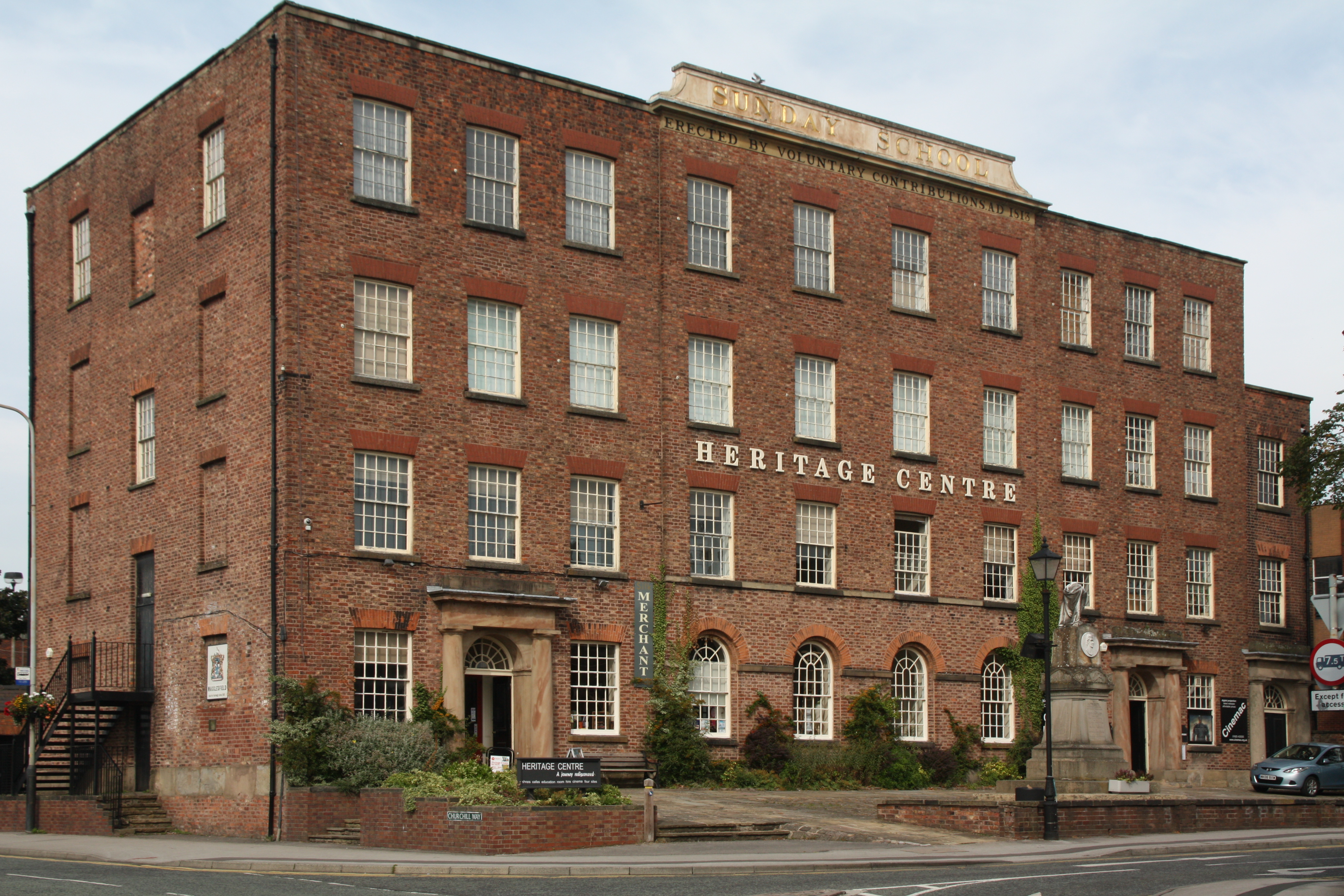
Macclesfield Sunday School: Now used as a heritage centre dedicated to the Silk Industry

Macclesfield Sunday School is in Roe Street, Macclesfield, Cheshire, England. It started in 1796 as a non-denominational Sunday School in Pickford Street, which catered for 40 children. It was founded by John Whitaker whose objective was "to lessen the sum of human wretchedness by diffusing religious knowledge and useful learning among the lower classes of society". Though chapels set up their denominational schools, the Sunday School committee in 1812 elected to erect a purpose-built school on Roe Street. The Big Sunday School had 1,127 boys and 1,324 girls on its books when it opened. The building is now known as The Old Sunday School and is part of Macclesfield Museums.

Sunday schools were first set up in the 1780s to provide education to working children on their one-day off from the factory. It was proposed by Robert Raikes, editor of the Gloucester Journal in an article in his paper and supported by many clergymen. It aimed to teach the youngsters reading, writing and ciphering and a knowledge of the Bible.

In 1785, it was reported that 250,000 children were attending Sunday School and there were 5,000 in Manchester alone. By 1895, the Society for the Establishment and Promotion of Sunday Schools had distributed 91,915 spelling books, 24,232 Testaments and 5,360 Bibles. The Sunday School movement was cross-denominational, and through subscription built large buildings that could host public lectures as well as classrooms. In the early days, adults attended the same classes as the infants, as each were instructed in basic reading. In Macclesfield, the Methodists withdrew from the Large Sunday School and built their own, and the Anglicans set up their own "National" schools that acted as Sunday Schools and day schools. These schools were the precursors to a national system of education. Later, a ragged school was set up for the children of the poor, the rough sleepers and children from the workhouse.

The role of the Sunday Schools changed with the Elementary Education Act 1870. In the 1920s, they promoted sports, and it was common for teams to compete in a Sunday School League. They were social centres hosting amateur dramatics and concert parties. By the 1960s the term Sunday School could refer to the building and not to any education classes, and by the 1970s even the largest Sunday School at Stockport had been demolished. The Macclesfield Large Sunday School was rescued and converted into the Macclesfield Heritage Centre.

== The Sunday School Movement ==
The first Sunday school may have been opened in 1751 in St. Mary's Church, Nottingham. Another early start was made by Hannah Ball, a native of High Wycombe in Buckinghamshire, who founded a school there in 1769. However, the founding of Sunday schools is more commonly associated with the work of Robert Raikes, editor of the Gloucester Journal, who saw the need to prevent children in the slums descending into crime.

In 18th century England, education was reserved for a minority and was not compulsory. The wealthy educated their children privately, i.e. at home, with a hired governess, or possibly tutors once they were older; boys of that class were often sent away to boarding school, hence these fee-based educational establishments were known, confusingly, as public schools. The town-based middle class may have sent their sons to grammar school; daughters were left to learn what they could from their mothers or from their father's library. The children of factory workers received no formal education, typically working alongside their parents six days a week, sometimes more than 13 hours a day.

In 1781, Raikes saw the plight of children living in the Gloucester slums. In the home of Mrs. Meredith, he opened the first school on Sunday, the only day these boys and girls living in the slums and working in the factories could attend. Using the Bible as their textbook, he taught them to read and write.

Within four years over 250,000 children were attending schools on Sunday throughout England. In 1784, many new schools opened, including the interdenominational Stockport Sunday School, which provided a model for Macclesfield. Stockport Sunday School constructed a school for 5,000 scholars in 1805; in the late nineteenth century this was accepted as being the largest in the world. By 1831, it was reported that attendance at Sunday Schools had grown to 1.2 million. Raikes' schools were seen as the first schools of the English state system.

== Sunday Schools in Macclesfield ==
In 1778, Rev David Simpson of Christ Church Macclesfield, Charles Roe's church, opened two charity schools for the children of the poor. By 1786, 412 children attended, learning reading and the Bible. When management was handed over to a committee of gentlemen, the school failed.

In 1796, John Whitaker, a leading Methodist whose father was an alderman, commenced a free Sunday School for 40 children in Pickford Street. It was non-denominational and run by the Sunday School Committee.

Churches started to build and run their own. Townley Street Congregational Church had a congregation of Unitarians and Wesleyan Methodists. Some questioned the need for the chapel to invest in education, and whether the poor should be taught to read and write, but a Sunday school was opened in 1902–3 with 160 pupils. In 1880, a day school was added and a separate building erected.

In 1812, Whitaker's Sunday School Committee decided to erect a purpose-built Sunday School. The Anglicans wanted to erect a day school, and it was first thought that these could occupy the same building, but agreement was not forthcoming and two buildings were constructed. The Anglicans constructed their National School on Duke Street.

While the Big Sunday School on Roe Street, financed by public subscription was completed in April 1814, the Methodists could not agree with Whitaker's insistence that it should be non-denominational, and withdrew to build their own denominational school on Mill Street in 1819.

The Primitive Methodists established themselves in Macclesfield in 1819, and had their own well-attended Sunday School classes and built their own building in 1835 on Beech Lane.

Lord Street Sunday School, started in 1820–1 by the Methodist New Connexion, met in the vestry of Parsonage Street Chapel. They erected a building of their own in 1869. This doubled as a day school until 1911, then served as a barracks, a temporary library and finally from 1953 as a home to an amateur dramatic company serving as a theatre – MADS Theatre.

Brunswick Street Methodist Chapel had a purpose-built Sunday School before 1845. It continued as a Sunday School until 1986.

Throughout the 19th century, reforms were being made to the provision of education in England culminating in the Elementary Education Act 1870. The church no longer saw the need to involve themselves in literacy and numeracy, and Sunday Schools saw their sole purpose as religious education.

== The Big Sunday School ==
Whitaker's Sunday school, founded on 1 May 1796, had been popular and in 1798 there were 812 pupils and the annual expenses were £68-2s–4d. In 1800, there were 1,128 pupils and the cost was £93-4s–3½d. The school was accommodated in Hardens Factory on Dukes Street. This was financed from a monthly subscription from itś supporters. By 1812, there were 2,149 children meeting in five locations so a new school was proposed on Roe Street, a central location. The building included an auditorium with a balcony with raked seating, following the Stockport Sunday School example. Gas lighting was installed in 1819.

It was opened in April 1814 having cost £5,639; £3,000 was raised by subscription and £1,000 came from fund-raising by the scholars and teachers. Scholars were to pay 1d a week. By this time there were 1,127 boys and 1,324 girls on the roll. Scholars were expected to be at least six years old, free of any "contagious distemper" and to arrive "washed" and "combed". The trustees were prominent in the Cheshire silk industry. When John Whitaker died at the age of 47, in October 1820, his nephew Samuel Higginbotham continued as superintendent for the next 40 years. The school continued to thrive.

Over the following decades the working condition of children improved. When the Factories Act 1844 reduced the hours that children were permitted to work, the Sunday School responded by opening a day school as well. By 1865, there were 26 Sunday schools in the town, so inevitably the number of scholars dropped from nearly 2,500 to about 1,500. It remained important as a day school, and became the home to many clubs, societies and events. It was also a meeting place for some of the smaller trade unions.

== The Old Sunday School ==
The Sunday school closed in September 1973. It had stopped keeping registers in 1967 when average attendance was fourteen. Funds were disbursed to various missionary organisations. Though the fabric of the building was deteriorating it was listed as a Grade II* Listed Building because of its historical significance. Stockport Sunday School had already been lost. A new charitable trust, The Macclesfield Sunday School Heritage Trust, was formed and funds were raised and the building restored. Essential work and fitting out the museum cost £500,000. The building is now known as The Old Sunday School and is managed by Macclesfield Museums. It has multiple uses which include a Museum with Victorian School Room.

== See also ==
- Grade II* listed buildings in Cheshire East
- Listed buildings in Macclesfield
