= Bill Fox =

Bill Fox may refer to:

- Bill Fox (goldminer) (1827–1890), New Zealand gold prospector and miner
- Bill Fox (musician), American musician with The Mice
- Bill Fox (politician) (1899–1994), New Zealand Labour Party politician
- Bill Fox (baseball) (1872–1946), Major League Baseball infielder

== See also ==
- William Fox (disambiguation)
- Billy Fox (disambiguation)
