= RMBM =

RMBM may refer to:

- Reichsministerium für Bewaffnung und Munition
- Rocky Mountain Bible Mission
