= Sunday school =

Christian educational institution

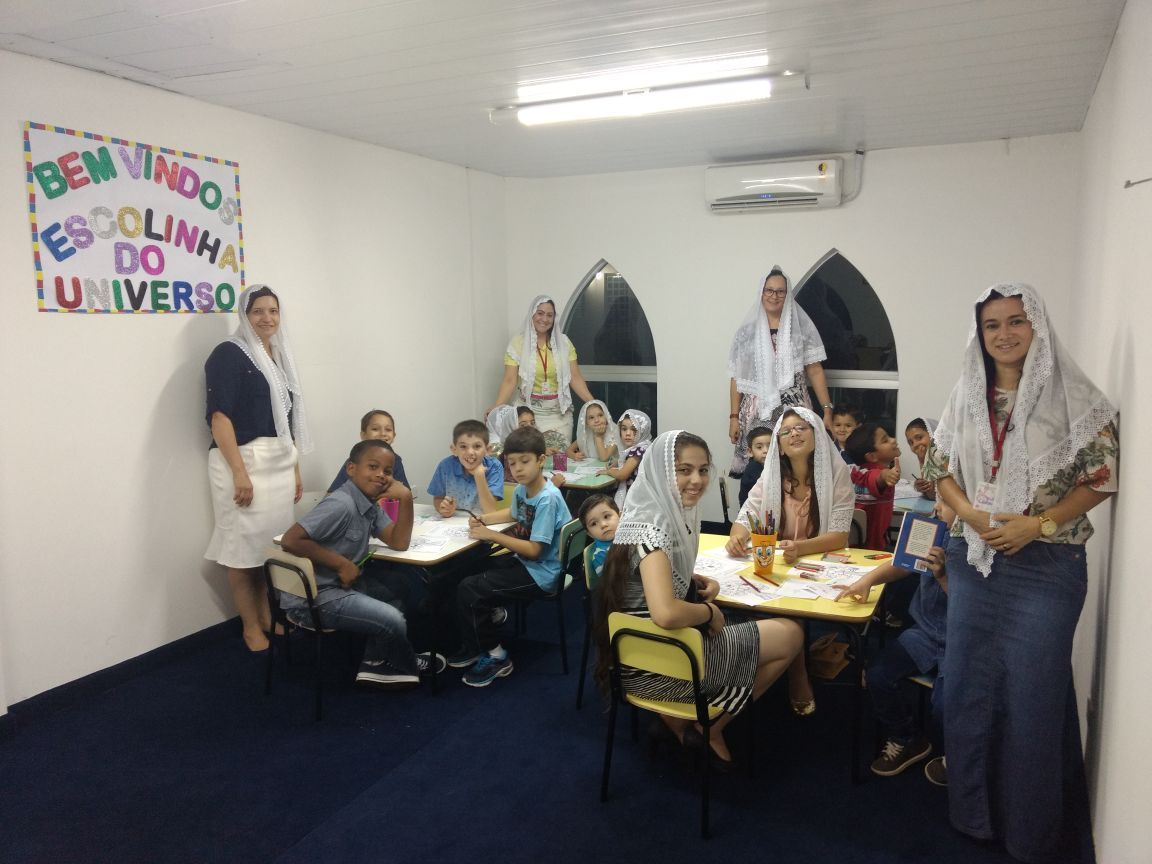
Sunday school class at a Pentecostal church in Brazil (2017)

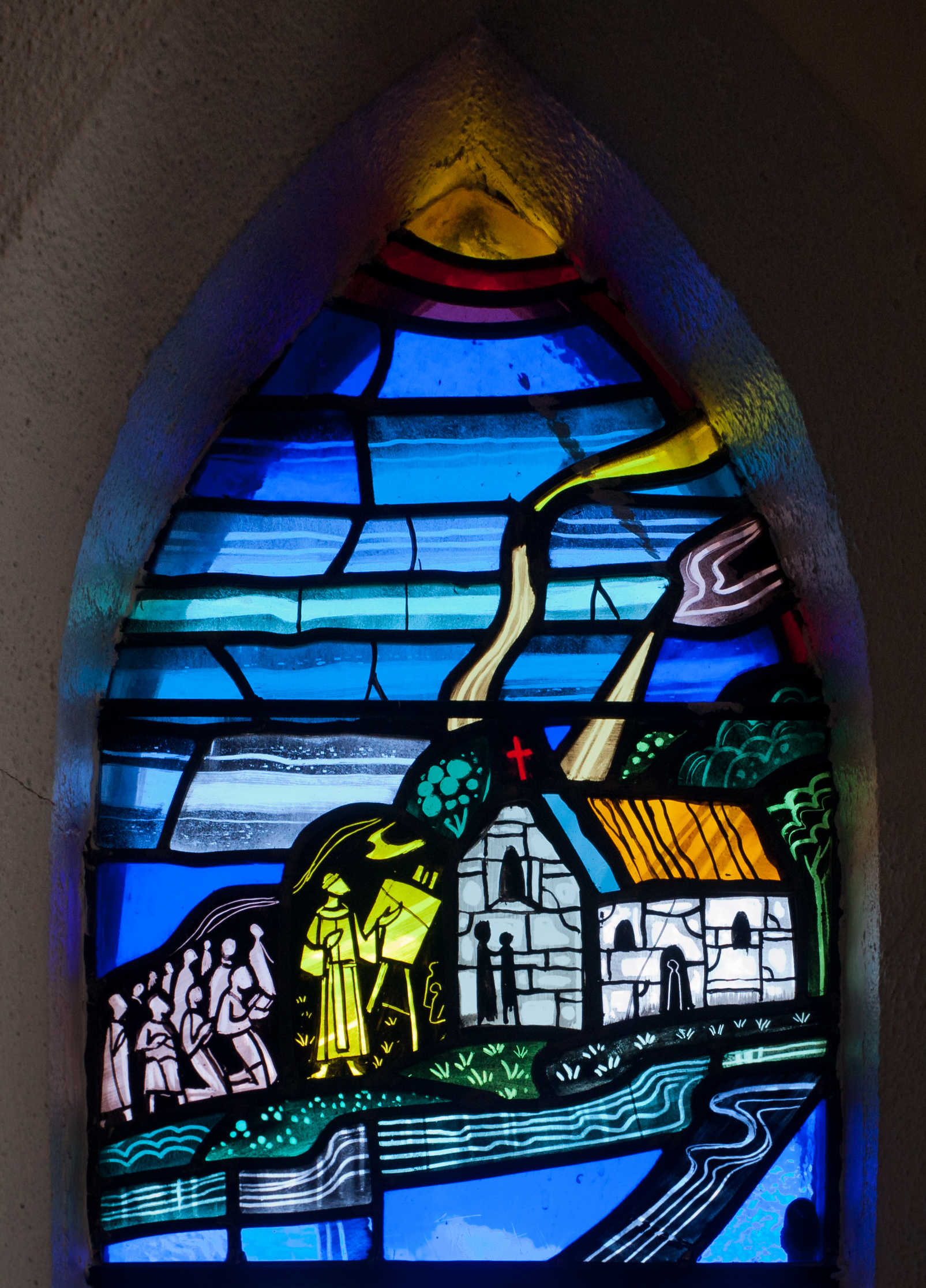
Stained glass window depicting a teaching Patrician Brother in a Sunday School in front of a church

A Sunday school, known as a Sabbath school in some sabbatarian Christian denominations, is an educational institution or weekly activity in a place of worship, usually Christian in character. A number of Sunday schools have classes for children, as well as those for young adults and seniors.

Sunday school classes usually precede a Sunday church service and are used to provide catechesis to Christians, especially children and teenagers, and sometimes adults as well. Churches of many Christian denominations have classrooms attached to the church used for this purpose. Many Sunday school classes operate on a set curriculum, with some teaching attendees a catechism. Members often receive certificates and awards for participation, as well as attendance. Some Sabbath schools are on Saturdays (as with Seventh-day Adventists).

In first-day Sabbatarian churches (such as Reformed Churches and Methodist denominations), Sabbath school occurs on Sundays, which is regarded as the Lord's Day and Christian Sabbath. In the present day, first-day Sabbatarian denominations often refer to Sabbath school as Sunday school.

Sunday school classes may provide a light breakfast. On days when Holy Communion is being celebrated during the service of worship, however, some Christian denominations encourage fasting before receiving the Eucharistic elements.

== Early history ==
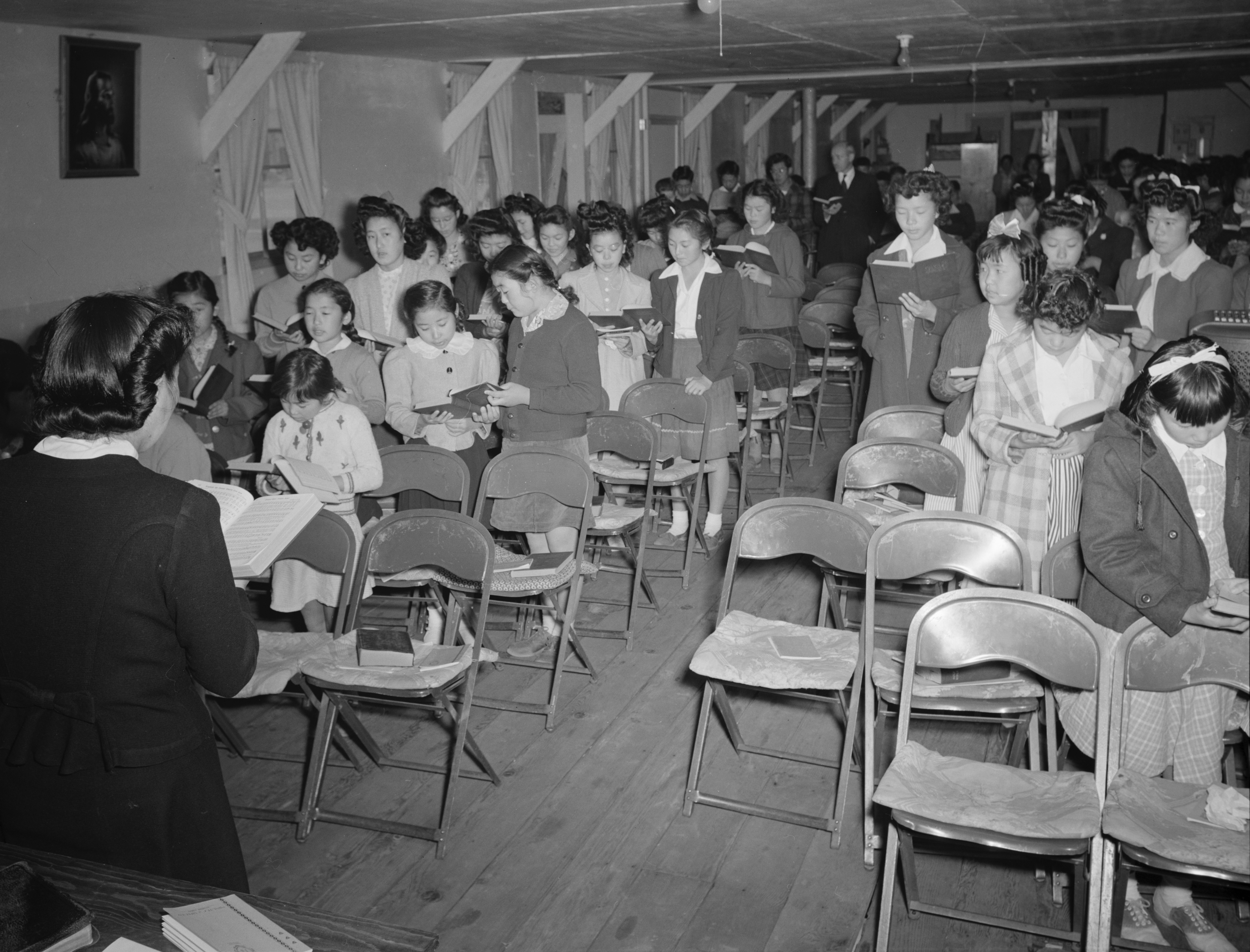
Sunday school, Manzanar War Relocation Center, 1943. Photographed by Ansel Adams.

Sunday schools in Europe began with the Catholic Church's Confraternity of Christian Doctrine, founded in the 16th century by the archbishop Charles Borromeo to teach young Italian children the faith.

Protestant Sunday schools were first set up in the 18th century in England to provide education to working children. William King started a Sunday school in 1751 in Dursley, Gloucestershire. Robert Raikes, editor of the Gloucester Journal, started a similar one in Gloucester in 1781. He wrote an article in his journal, and as a result many clergymen supported schools, which aimed to teach the youngsters reading, writing, cyphering (doing arithmetic) and a knowledge of the Bible.

The Sunday School Society was founded by Baptist deacon William Fox on 7 September 1785 in Prescott Street Baptist Church of London. The latter had been touched by articles of Raikes, on the problems of youth crime. Pastor Thomas Stock and Raikes have thus registered a hundred children from six to fourteen years old. The society has published its textbooks and brought together nearly 4,000 Sunday schools.

In 1785, 250,000 English children were attending Sunday school. There were 5,000 in Manchester alone. By 1835, the Sunday School Society had distributed 91,915 spelling books, 24,232 New Testaments and 5,360 Bibles. The Sunday school movement was cross-denominational. Financed through subscription, large buildings were constructed that could host public lectures as well as provide classrooms. Adults would attend the same classes as the infants, as each was instructed in basic reading. In some towns, the Methodists withdrew from the large Sunday school and built their own. The Anglicans set up their National schools that would act as Sunday schools and day schools. These schools were the precursors to a national system of education.

The educational role of the Sunday schools ended with the Education Act 1870, which provided universal elementary education. In the 1920s they also promoted sports, and ran Sunday school leagues. They became social centres hosting amateur dramatics and concert parties. By the 1960s, the term Sunday school could refer to the building and rarely to the activities inside. By the 1970s even the largest Sunday school had been demolished. The locution today chiefly refers to catechism classes for children and adults that occur before, after, or during the church service (though, in family integrated churches, Sunday school is always held before the service of worship in order that families can attend the service of worship together). In certain Christian traditions, in certain grades, for example the second grade or eighth grade, Sunday school classes may prepare youth to undergo a rite such as First Communion or Confirmation. The doctrine of Sunday Sabbatarianism, held by many Christian denominations, encourages practices such as Sunday school attendance, as it teaches that the entirety of the Lord's Day should be devoted to God; as such many children and teenagers often return to the church in the late afternoon for youth group before attending an evening service of worship.

== Development in Protestant churches ==
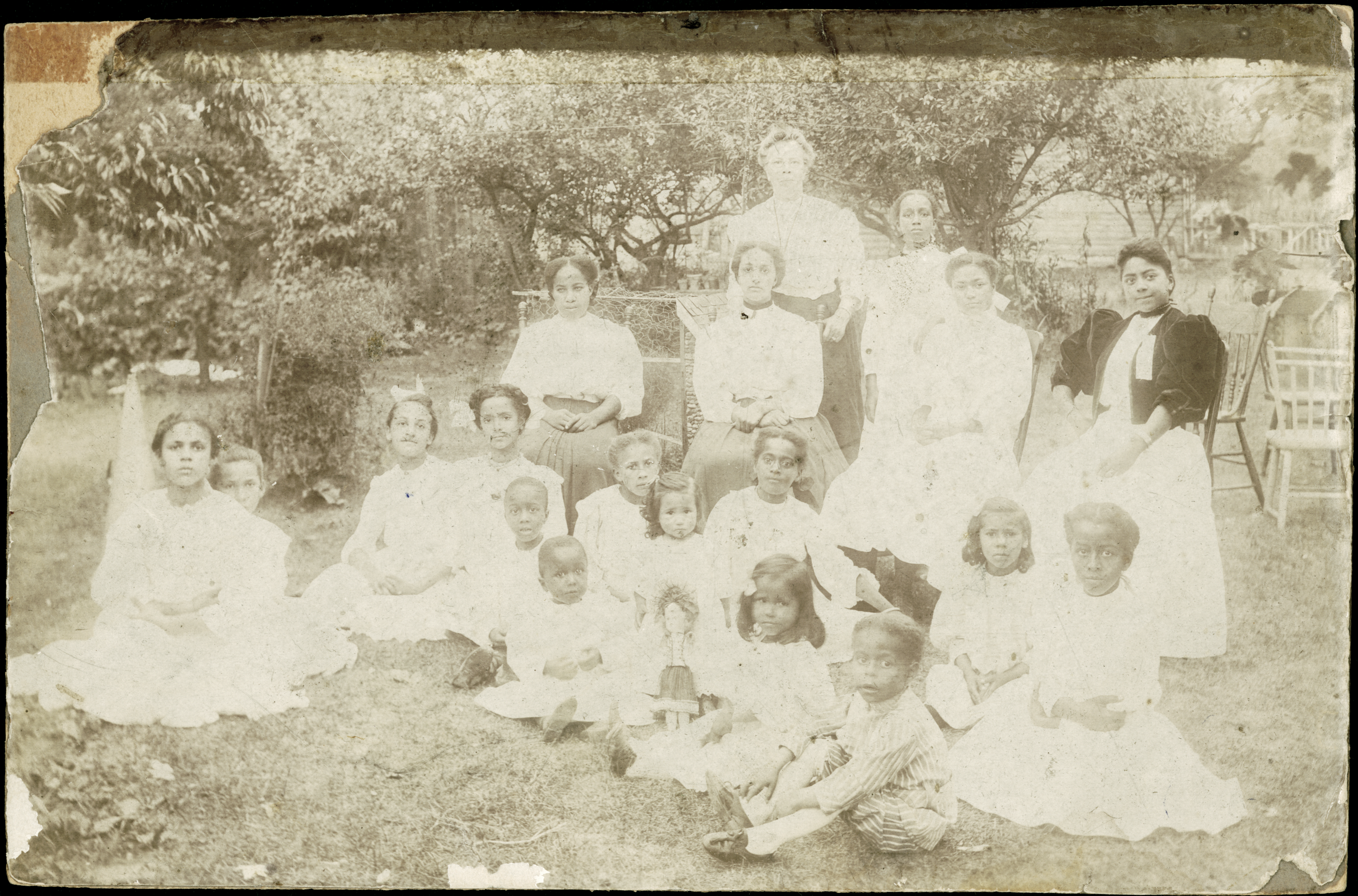
Baptist Sunday school group in Amherstburg, Ontario, c. 1910

=== United Kingdom ===
The first recorded Protestant Sunday school opened in 1751 in St Mary's Church, Nottingham. Hannah Ball made another early start, founding a school in High Wycombe, Buckinghamshire, in 1769. However, the pioneer of Sunday schools is commonly said to be Robert Raikes, editor of the Gloucester Journal, who in 1781, after prompting from William King (who was running a Sunday School in Dursley), recognised the need of children living in the Gloucester slums; the need also to prevent them from taking up crime. He opened a school in the home of a Mrs Meredith, operating it on a Sunday – the only day that the boys and girls working in the factories could attend. Using the Bible as their textbook, the children learned to read and write.

In 18th-century England, education was largely reserved for a wealthy, male minority and was not compulsory. The wealthy educated their children privately at home, with hired governesses or tutors for younger children. The town-based middle class may have sent their sons to grammar schools, while daughters were left to learn what they could from their mothers or from their fathers' libraries. The children of factory workers and farm labourers received no formal education, and typically worked alongside their parents six days a week, sometimes for more than 13 hours a day.

By 1785 over 250,000 children throughout England attended schools on Sundays. In 1784 many new schools opened, including the interdenominational Stockport Sunday School, which financed and constructed a school for 5,000 scholars in 1805. In the late-19th century this was accepted as being the largest in the world. By 1831 it was reported that attendance at Sunday schools had grown to 1.2 million.

The first Sunday school in London opened at Surrey Chapel, Southwark, under Rowland Hill. By 1831 1,250,000 children in Great Britain, or about 25 per cent of the eligible population, attended Sunday schools weekly. The schools provided basic lessons in literacy alongside religious instruction.

In 1833, "for the unification and progress of the work of religious education among the young", the Unitarians founded their Sunday School Association, as "junior partner" to the British and Foreign Unitarian Association, with which it eventually set up offices at Essex Hall in Central London.

The work of Sunday schools in the industrial cities was increasingly supplemented by "ragged schools" (charitable provision for the industrial poor), and eventually by publicly funded education under the terms of the Elementary Education Act 1870 (33 & 34 Vict. c. 75). Sunday schools continued alongside such increasing educational provision, and new forms also developed, such as the Socialist Sunday Schools movement, which began in the United Kingdom in 1886.

=== Ireland ===
The development of Sunday schools in Ireland was significantly influenced by the efforts of the Reverend Dr. Kennedy, who served as curate in the parish of Bright, County Down. He established his Sunday school programme in 1770 before Robert Raikes organised his Sunday-schools ten years later in July, 1780. Concerned by the widespread neglect of Sunday observance among local youth, Dr. Kennedy initiated gatherings focused on singing practice. This initiative proved successful and was subsequently expanded to include the reading of Psalms and scripture lessons.

By late 1785, Dr. Kennedy became aware of similar educational movements in England aimed at establishing Sunday schools. Recognizing that his own initiative aligned with these efforts, he collaborated with local associates to adopt a more structured and comprehensive approach modelled on the English system. During the winter months, they disseminated information about the concept and secured financial support from interested parties.

Following these preparations, the Bright Sunday School was formally inaugurated on the first Sunday of May 1786. Robert Henry, Esq., was appointed superintendent, with members of his family and other respected individuals serving as instructors. Thomas Turr, the parish clerk, also contributed to the school's operations as needed.

In 1787, a correspondent writing in Robert Raikes' newspaper reported that the Bishops of Cloyne and Clonfert had established Sunday schools within their dioceses. These initiatives yielded such evident results that the governing authorities of Ireland resolved to propose to the [Parliament of Ireland] a national education plan aimed at extending educational opportunities to the poorest segments of society.

Further institutional support emerged in 1805 when the Irish Methodist Conference passed resolutions advocating for the establishment of Sunday schools in every circuit. This endorsement facilitated the rapid expansion of the system throughout the country. As the movement grew, the demand for educational materials became increasingly pressing. However, the Sunday School Society in London was unable to provide adequate assistance, highlighting the need for a local organization to manage resources and support. This led to the founding of the Hibernian Sunday School Society, which played a pivotal role in sustaining and expanding Sunday school education in Ireland.

Daniel Delany, Roman Catholic priest also started a school in 1777 in Tullow, County Carlow. He set up a complex system which involved timetables, lesson plans, streaming, and various teaching activities. This system spread to other parishes in the diocese. By 1787 in Tullow alone there were 700 students, boys and girls, men and women, and 80 teachers. The primary intent of this Sunday school system was the teaching of the Catholic catechism and articles of faith; the teaching of reading and writing became necessary to assist in this. With the coming of Catholic Emancipation in Ireland (1829) and the establishment of the National Schools system (1831), which meant that the Catholic faith could be taught in school, the Catholic Sunday school system became unnecessary.

The Church of Ireland Sunday School Society was founded by the established Anglican Protestant church in 1809. The Sabbath School Society of the Presbyterian Church in Ireland was founded in 1862.

=== Sweden ===
The concept of Sunday school in Sweden started in the early to mid-1800s, initially facing some backlash, before becoming more mainstream, as it was often intertwined with the growth (and eventual legalization) of free churches. The first documented Sunday school was started in 1826 in Snavlunda parish, Örebro County, by priest Ringzelli, and was still active during the time of Pastor Lennart Sickeldal in the 1950s. Ringzelli was also an early organizer of school meals for students who lived far from the school or were from poor families.

Carl Ludvig Tellström, later missionary to the Sámi people, made another early attempt to start a Sunday school around 1834. While in Stockholm, he was converted by George Scott, an influential Scottish Wesleyan Methodist preacher who worked in Sweden from 1830 to 1842 and was controversial due to his preaching in violation of the Conventicle Act. Within the Church of Sweden, however, based on the format of Methodist Sunday schools, he started several in Flykälen, Föllinge, Ottsjön, Storå, and Tuvattnet.

Later, Mathilda Foy founded an early Sunday school in 1843–1844. Influenced by Pietistic revivalist preachers such as Scott, and particularly Carl Olof Rosenius, Foy found herself part of the läsare (Reader) movement. Always engaged in charitable work, she started a Sunday school not long after her spiritual awakening. However, it was soon closed due to the protests of clergy, who considered it "Methodist". Another attempt by Augusta Norstedt was noted around the same time.

Sometime between 1848 and 1856, educator and preacher Amelie von Braun, also part of the revivalist awakening movement, started a Sunday school primarily teaching children Bible stories. She worked within the state church. Her Sunday school was supported by Peter Fjellstedt and grew quickly, with 250 students noted in 1853.

Around 1851, Sunday schools were established by Foy's friends Betty Ehrenborg (1818–1880) and Per Palmqvist (1815–1887), brother of Swedish Baptist pioneers Johannes and Gustaf Palmquist. That year, Ehrenborg and the brothers traveled to London. The brothers, at least, reconnected with Scott, whom they knew from Sweden. In England, they studied the Methodists' Sunday schools and teaching methods, impressed by the number of students and teachers. There were over 250 children and 20 to 30 teachers; classes were taught by laypeople and included literacy training in addition to Bible lessons, singing, and prayer.

Upon Palmqvist's return to Sweden, he invited 25 local poor children and founded the first Baptist Sunday school; the same year, Ehrenborg began a Sunday school as well, with 13 mostly Baptist and free-church students. Palmqvist was given £5 in financial support by the London Sunday School Association and used the money to travel to Norrland, home of a significant revival movement, to spread the idea of Sunday school there. The first Sunday school association in Sweden, Stockholms Lutherska Söndagsskolförening, was started in 1868. However, even despite the abolition of the Conventicle Act in 1858 and increasing religious freedom, there were still challenges: Palmqvist was reported to the Stockholm City Court by a priest in 1870 for teaching children who did not belong to his congregation, but was later acquitted.

In Stockholm alone, there were 29 Sunday schools by 1871. By 1915 there were 6,518 Sunday schools in the country among a number of denominations, with 23,058 officers and teachers and 317,648 students.

=== Finland ===
The first Sunday schools in Finland were run by the Evangelical Lutheran Church of Finland, with the first one founded in 1807. They were often for those who had not become literate. As a form of schooling, they were recommended by the state in 1853. Some Sunday schools gave vocational training in the trades; after 1858 they were also preparatory schools for further education held during the week. However, Sunday schools did not catch on until the later growth of free churches in the country as well as the establishment of public schooling, at which point they became a form of children's religious education. One of the earliest free-church Sunday schools was founded by sisters Netta and Anna Heikel in Jakobstad in the 1860s. More Sunday schools were soon founded in the 1870s and 1880s: in Vaasa – including by the local Lutheran parish, in Kotka, Turku, Åland, Helsinki, Ekenäs, Hanko, and other cities.

=== United States ===
The first organized and documented Sunday school in the United States was founded in Ephrata, Lancaster County, Pennsylvania, by an immigrant from Germany, Ludwig Höcker, the son of a well-respected and influential Reformed Church Pastor and teacher in Westerwald. Ludwig immigrated in the 1730s and joined the Sabbatarian Ephrata Cloister in 1739, where he soon created the Sunday school for the impoverished children of the area, and published, on the Ephrata Press, a full textbook. Rev. Ira Lee Cottrell writes:"It is especially interesting to us to know that a Seventh Day Baptist Sabbath school was organized about 1740, forty years before Robert Raikes Sunday-school. This Sabbath school was organized at Ephrata, Pa., by Ludwig Hocker among the Seventh Day Baptist Germans, and continued until 1777, when their room with others was given up for hospital purposes after the battle of Brandywine…".

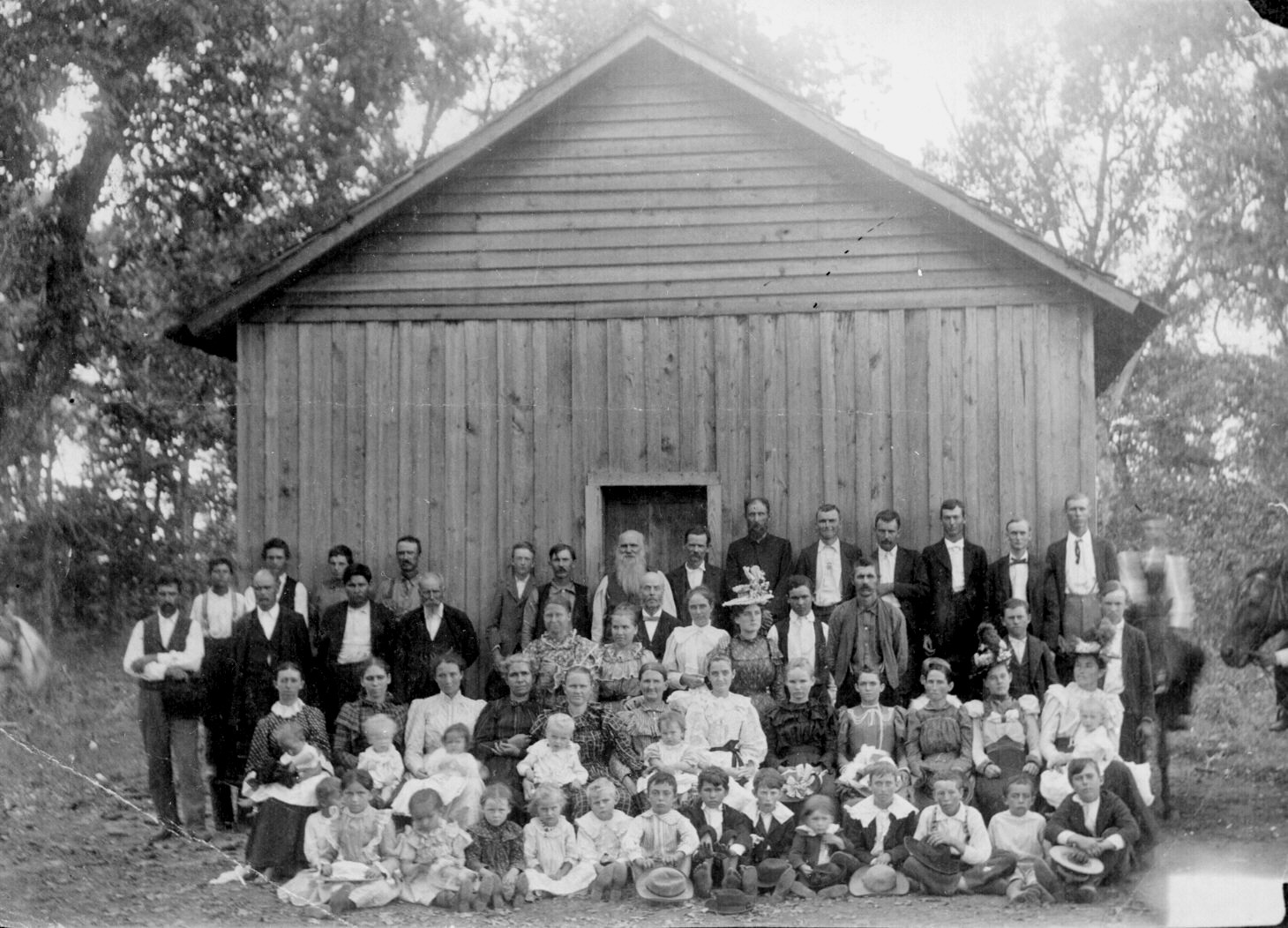
Sunday school, Indians and whites. Indian Territory (Oklahoma), US, c. 1900.

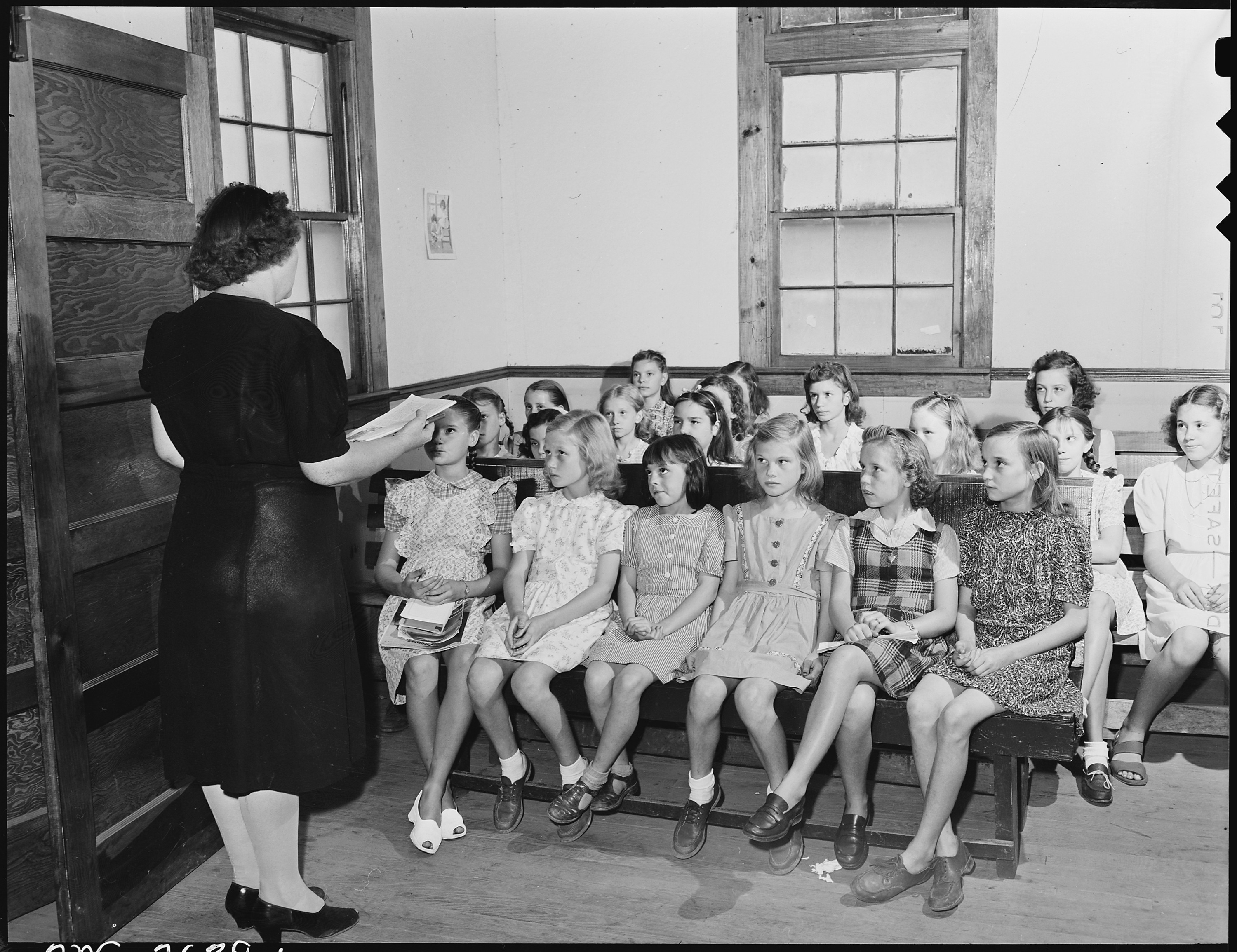
Sunday school at a Baptist church in Lejunior, Harlan County, Kentucky in the United States, 1946

In New England a Sunday school system was first begun by Samuel Slater in his textile mills in Pawtucket, Rhode Island, in the 1790s.

In the mid-1860s philanthropist Lewis Miller was the inventor of the "Akron Plan" for Sunday schools. It was a building layout with a central assembly hall surrounded by small classrooms, conceived with Methodist minister John Heyl Vincent and architect Jacob Snyder. It was soon widely copied.

John Heyl Vincent collaborated with Baptist layman B. F. Jacobs, who devised a system in the 1870s to encourage Sunday school work, and a committee was established to provide the International Uniform Lesson Curriculum, also known as the "Uniform Lesson Plan". By the 1800s 80% of all new members were introduced to the church through Sunday school.

In 1874, interested in improving the training of Sunday school teachers for the Uniform Lesson Plan, Miller and Vincent worked together again to found what is now the Chautauqua Institution on the shores of Chautauqua Lake, New York.

Increasingly the public elementary schools were handling literacy. In response the Sunday schools switched to an emphasis on Bible stories, hymn singing, and memorizing Biblical passages. The main goal was encouraging the conversion experience that was so important to evangelicals.

Notable 20th-century leaders in the Sunday school movement include: President Jimmy Carter, Clarence Herbert Benson, Henrietta Mears, founder of Gospel Light, Dr. Gene A. Getz, Howard Hendricks, Lois E. LeBar, Lawrence O. Richards, and Elmer Towns.

== By Christian denomination ==
=== Evangelical-Lutheranism ===
In the Evangelical-Lutheran Churches, Sunday schools emphasize the teaching of Luther's Small Catechism.

Evangelical-Lutheran curriculum for Sunday school includes those published by Concordia Publishing House and Northwestern Publishing House.

=== Methodism ===
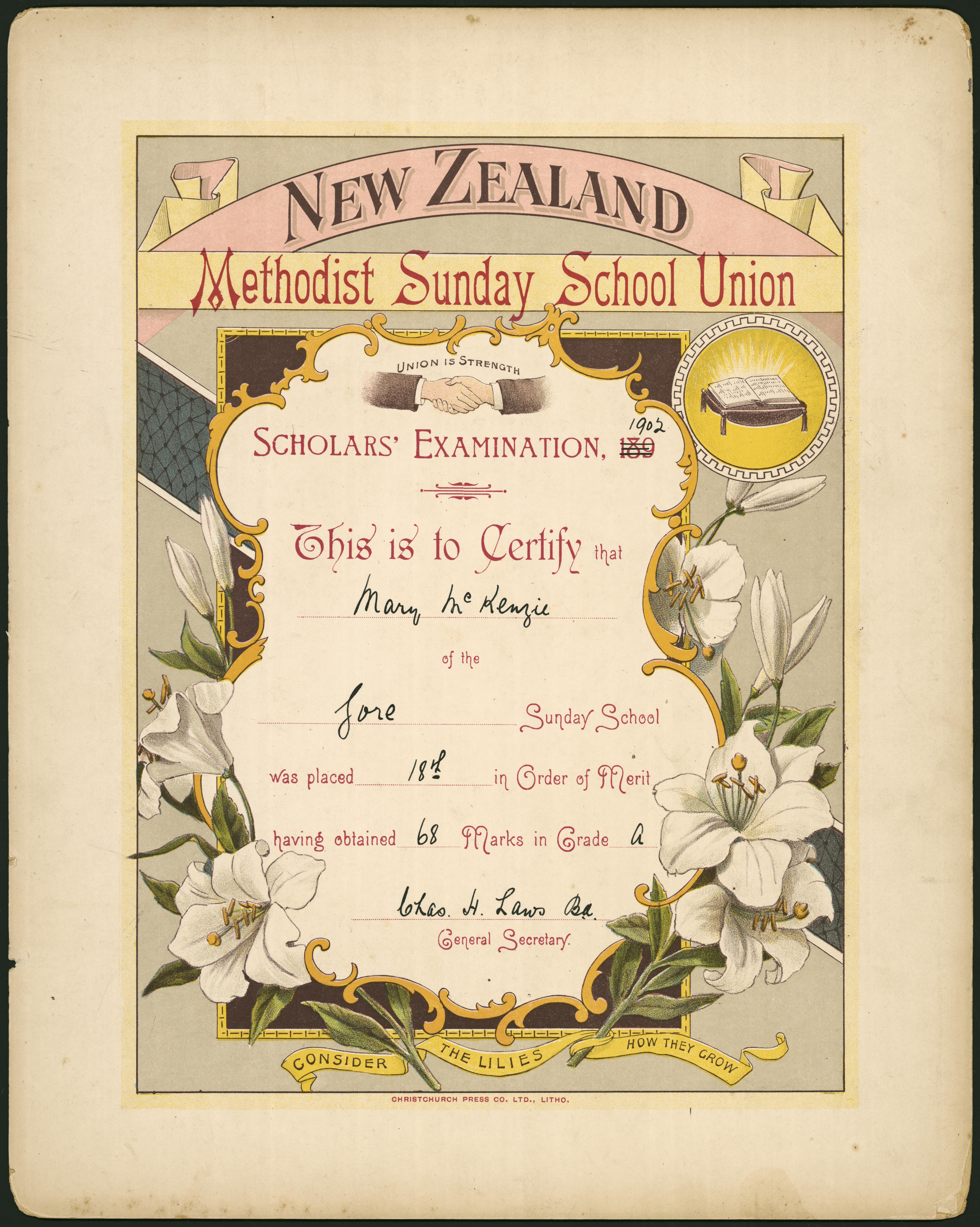
Methodist Sunday School Union certificate

The 1819 minutes of the Methodist Sunday School Society specified that "A Sunday school is strictly and entirely a religious institution, whose object is to train up children in the nurture and admonition of the Lord." Traditionally, after attending Sunday school, Methodist children attend the service of worship with their parents. Wesleyan Methodist denominations use various Sunday School curricula, such as Circuit Rider (Old Paths Tract Society) and those texts published by Herald and Banner Press.

The Book of Discipline of the Allegheny Wesleyan Methodist Connection states the Objectives for its Sunday Schools in Section VIII:

The ultimate objective of our Christian education program is to declare the truth of full salvation through Jesus Christ, as recorded in the Holy Scriptures, and to guide sinful, fallen men to experience the crises of conversion and entire sanctification, dynamic service to God and man, and continuous growth unto the fulness of the stature of Christ. To accomplish this, we will endeavor:

1. To help each person to recognize the Bible as the inspired Word of God, and to know, believe, and obey its teachings.
2. To help each person to recognize his need of salvation and of God's provision for it through Christ's death and resurrection, and to lead him to experience the new birth through repentance and faith in Jesus Christ.
3. To help each convert to recognize his need for cleansing from the carnal nature and for the sanctifying and empowering presence of the Holy Spirit, and to experience this in the crisis of entire sanctification.
4. To help each believer to relate himself to the church as the body of Christ, encouraging him to become a member of a local church and to find his place of service within it.
5. To instruct each person in the fundamentals of the faith, the history of the Christian Church, the importance of the Reformation and the Wesleyan Movement, and the history of The Allegheny Wesleyan Methodist Connection and its missionary outreach, warning him against the false doctrines of the age and equipping him as a witness for his Lord.
6. To help each person develop a Christian interpretation of life and of the universe, enabling him to see God's sovereign purpose at work, and training him to be a good steward of the talents, time, opportunities, and material goods with which God has entrusted him.
7. To encourage each person to grow toward spiritual maturity in Christ Jesus, demonstrating Christian attitudes and actions in every relationship of life.

The Doctrines and Discipline of the Methodist Church specifies concerning Sabbath Schools in ¶330, "The instruction given in the school shall be the doctrines of the word of God as expounded in the recognized standards of the Methodist Church. The Methodist Catechisms shall be taught in each school." Wesleyan Methodist denominations use various Sabbath School curricula, such as Circuit Rider (Old Paths Tract Society) and those texts published by Herald and Banner Press. Sunday Sabbath schools for people of all ages has been emphasized in the Methodist tradition:

Constantly, we are meeting men and women fifty, sixty, and seventy years of age who have never seen a Bible. They come, anxious and earnest, to be led into the truth. Such, "as new-born babes, desire the sincere milk of the word." Now, all such people, no matter what their age or other circumstances, can only be considered as children. They should be, and are, gathered into Sabbath-schools to read and study the word of God.

=== Reformed ===
Reformed Churches (Continental Reformed, Presbyterian, Congregationalist, and Reformed Anglican) provide for Sabbath School curriculum. The Free Presbyterian Church of Ulster Sabbath School curriculum categorizes various objectives by age group. The Reformed cleric James Calvin McFeeters expounded upon the Sabbath School curricula, stating that it should be from the Bible and the subordinate standards such as the Westminster Standards.

=== Seventh-day Adventist Church ===
In Seventh-day Sabatatarian churches (such as the Seventh-day Adventist Church, Seventh Day Baptists, Church of God, among others), Sabbath School occurs on Saturdays.

== Form ==
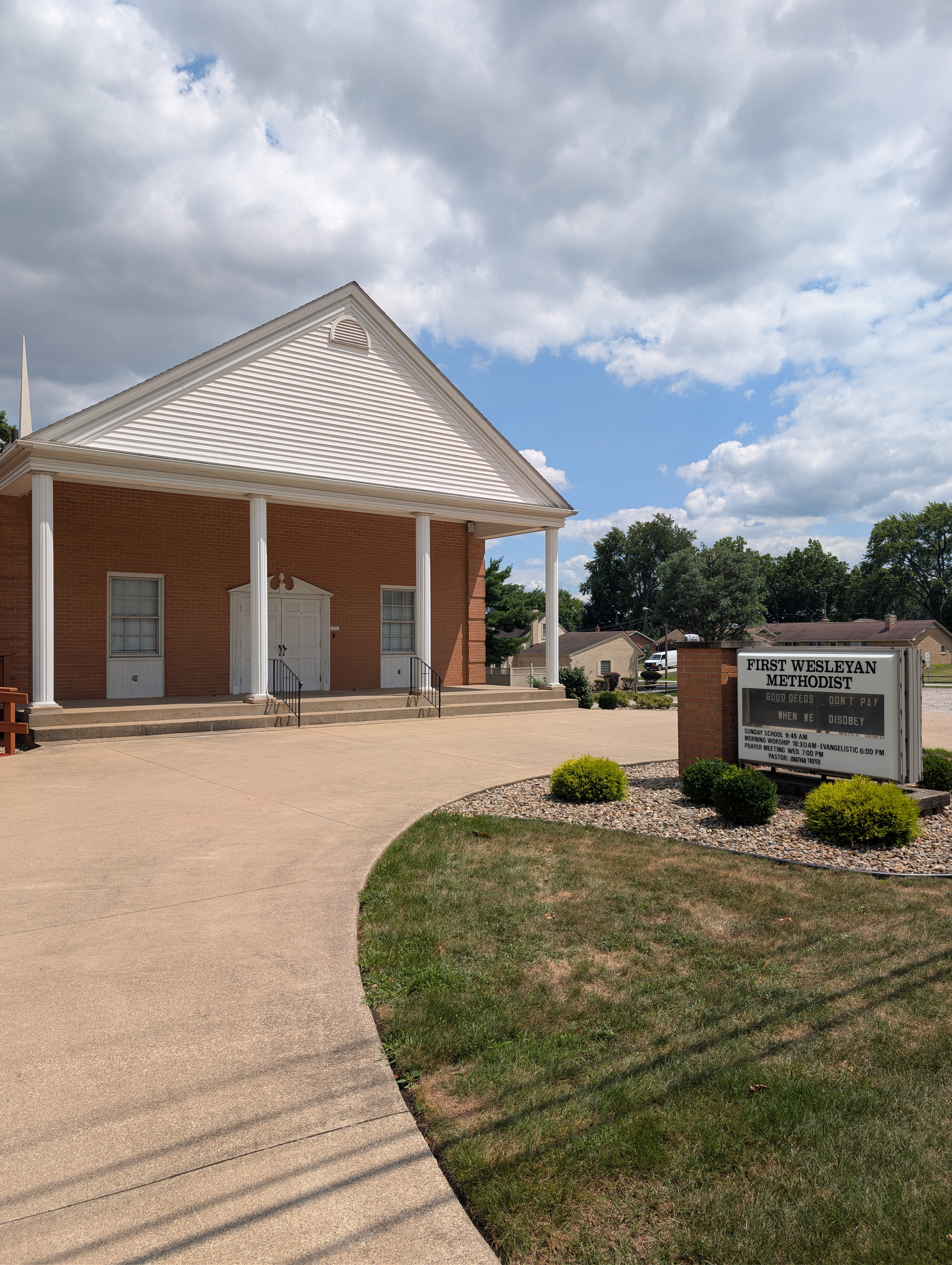
The sign of this Wesleyan Methodist church displays the times for Sunday school, as well as the Sunday morning service of worship and Sunday evening service of worship, consistent with the historical First-day Sabbatarian doctrine of Methodism to keep the Lord's Day holy. The midweek Wednesday prayer service (a common Methodist observance) is indicated on the sign as well.

In Evangelical churches, prior to the worship service, children and young people receive an adapted education, in Sunday school, in a separate room.

Historically, Sunday schools were held in the afternoons in various communities, and were often staffed by workers from varying denominations. Beginning in the United States in the early 1930s and Canada in the 1940s, the transition was made to Sunday mornings. Sunday school often takes the form of a one-hour or longer Bible study, which can occur before, during, or after a church service. While many Sunday schools are focused on providing instruction for children (especially those sessions occurring during service times), adult Sunday-school classes are also popular and widespread (see RCIA). In some traditions, the term "Sunday school" is too strongly associated with children, and alternate terms such as "Adult Electives" or "religious education" are used instead of "Adult Sunday school". Some churches only operate Sunday school for children concurrently with the adult worship service. In this case, there is typically no adult Sunday school.

== Publishers ==
In Great Britain an agency was formed called the Religious Tract Society which helped provide literature for the Sunday school.

In the United States the American Sunday School Union was formed (headquartered in Philadelphia) for the publication of literature. This group helped pioneer what became known as the International Sunday School Lessons. The Sunday School Times was another periodical they published for the use of Sunday schools.

Among Methodist churches, Herald and Banner Press and Old Paths Tract Society are used for Sunday school curriculum.

Among Baptist churches, LifeWay Christian Resources, David C. Cook, and Group Publishing are among the widely available published resources currently used in Sunday schools across the country.

== Teachers ==
Sunday school teachers are usually lay people who are selected for their role in the church by a designated coordinator, board, or a committee. Normally, the selection is based on a perception of character and ability to teach the Bible, rather than formal training in education. Some Sunday school teachers, however, do have a background in education as a result of their occupations. Some churches require Sunday school teachers and catechists to attend courses to ensure that they have a sufficient understanding of the faith and of the teaching process to educate others. Other churches allow volunteers to teach without training; a profession of faith and a desire to teach is all that is required in such cases.

It is also not uncommon for Catholic or Protestant pastors to teach such classes themselves. Some well-known public figures who teach, or have taught, Sunday school include Space Shuttle astronaut Ronald J. Garan Jr., comedian Stephen Colbert, novelist John Grisham, and former U.S. president Jimmy Carter.

== See also ==
- Catechesis
- Christian school
- Church service
- Confraternity of Christian Doctrine
- Family integrated church
- Hebrew school (also called "Sunday school" by Reform Jews)
- Sabbath School
- Rite of Christian Initiation of Adults
- Sunday School (LDS Church)
- Sunday school answer
- Sunday School Society
- Sunday School Union
- Vacation Bible School
- Youth ministry

== Sources ==
- Rowe, Mortimer (1959), The History of Essex Hall, London: Lindsey Press, archived from the original on 2012-01-16
