= Metro Cave / Te Ananui Cave =

Cave system in West Coast, New Zealand

Coordinates: 41°56′3″S 171°29′0″E

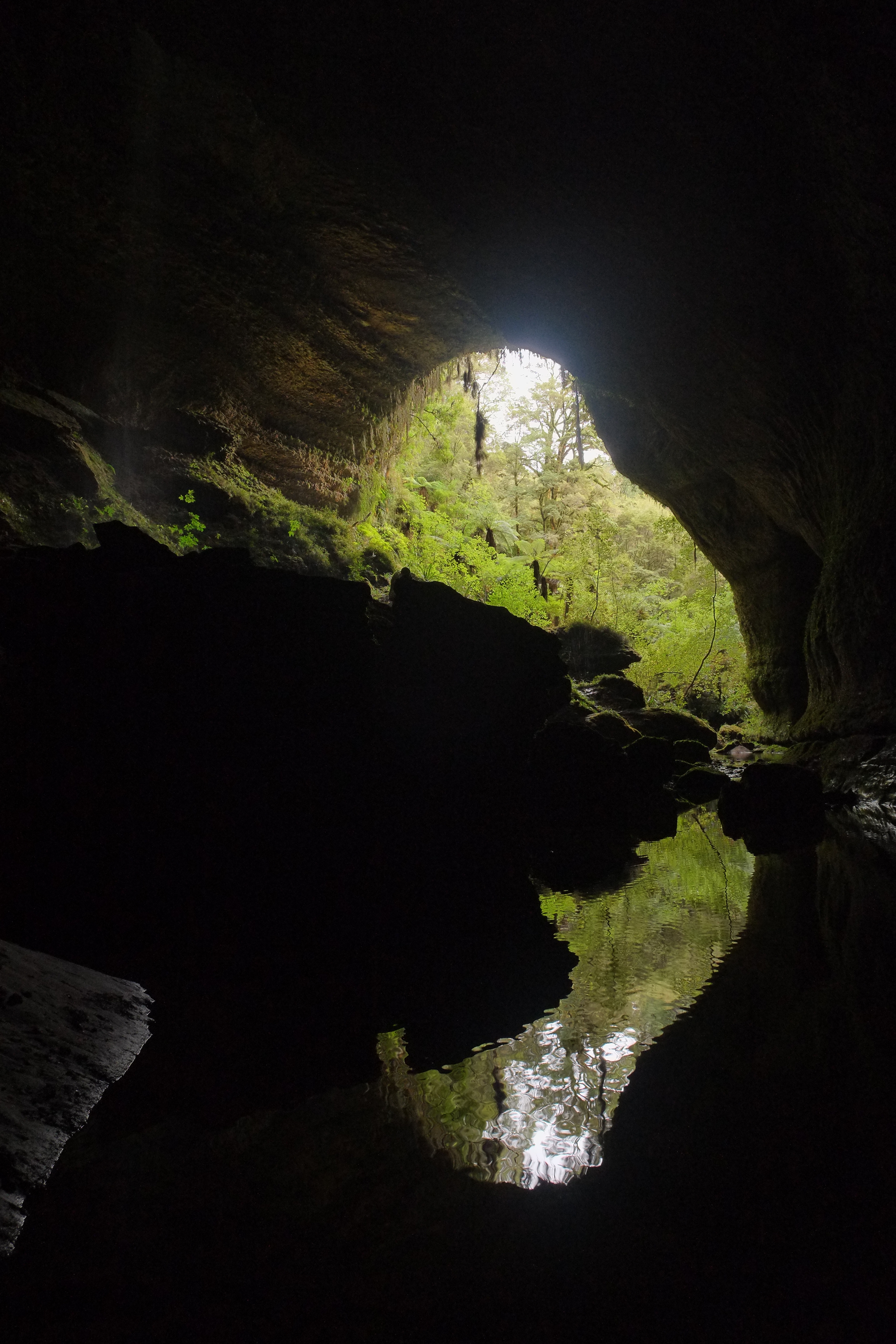
Ananui Creek entrance

The Metro / Te Ananui Caves are a maze of limestone caves formed by the underground capture of Ananui Creek, a tributary of the Waitakere / Nile River. The caves are located in the Paparoa National Park in New Zealand, managed by the Department of Conservation. Parts of the cave system are accessible by cave tours and rafting, operated by a commercial tour operator out of Charleston.

== History ==
The karst landscape in the area was under the sea some 30 million years ago, then pushed upwards over time. Over the past 200,000 years, weathering and water have been dissolving the limestone and shaping both the surface as well as the underground. Te Ananui Cave contains fossils and bones carbon-dated to between 300 and 25,000 years old, as well as shellfish fossils in the limestone itself.

== Geography ==
Tours from Charleston access Te Ananui Caves via a 3 km narrow road, followed by a bush tram ride and a short walk. The walking track crosses the Waitakere or Nile River on a suspension bridge to reach the Triclops entrance halfway up the side of the Nile River valley.

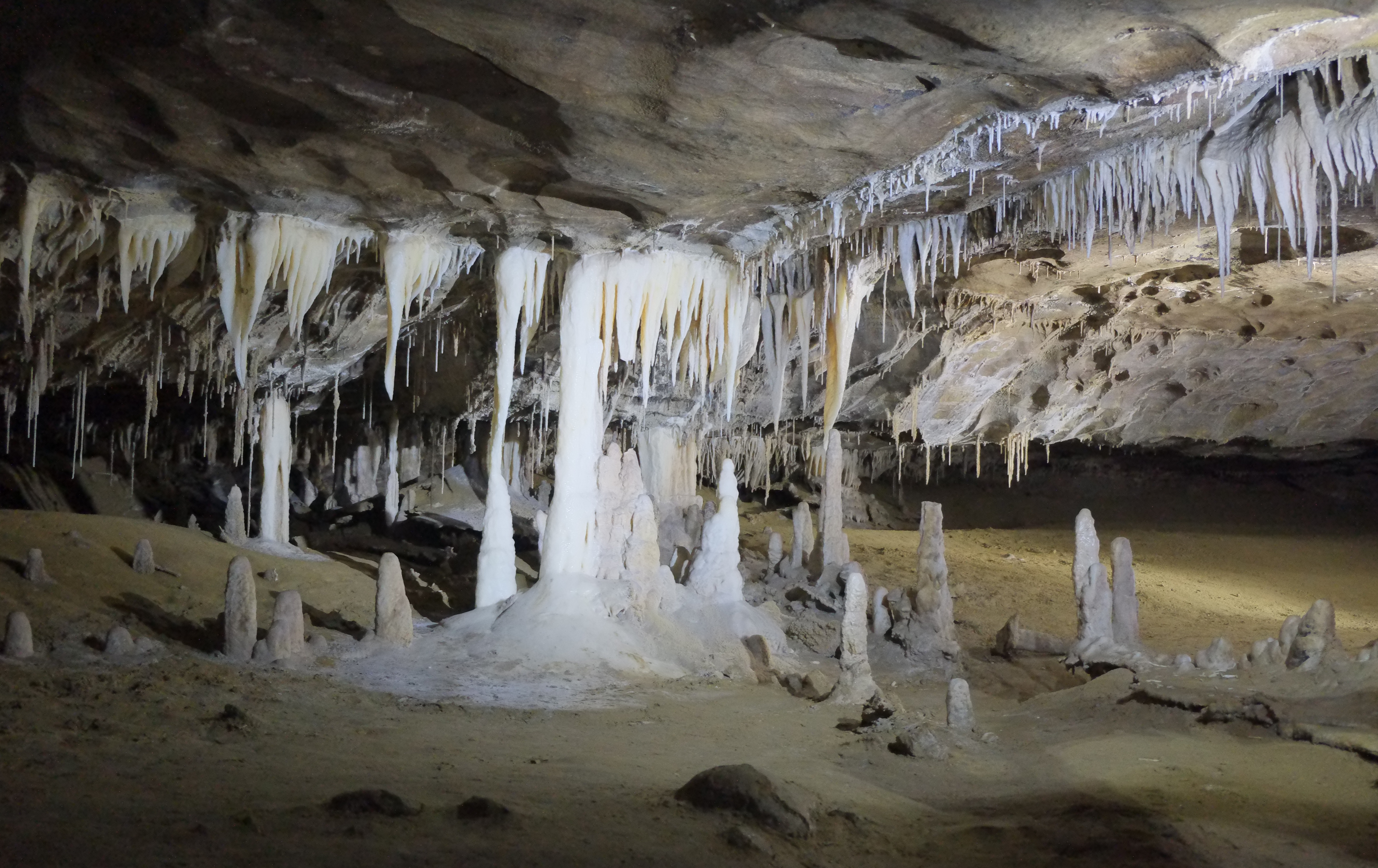
Metro Cave / Te Ananui Cave

The passages of the 8 km Metro complex get younger from west to east, following the pattern of cave development. Over time as the land has lifted, the upper levels of the cave system have become dry and have grown various cave formations, while the lower levels continue to be shaped and changed by the underground streams flowing through them. An easily navigable dry passage leads from the Triclops entrance to the Ananui Creek entrance.

== Recreation ==
A tour company based in Charleston offers several options for exploring the Te Ananui Caves, ranging from a guided walking tour of the upper levels including the Nile River Glowworm Cave, to underground rafting and adventure caving. A bush tram track was commissioned in 2002 for transport of visitors from the road end to near the cave entrance.

The caves themselves are left in their natural state, with no ladders or suspended walkways, however, the terrain of the upper levels is easy to walk on, comparable to a tramping track. The cave system features several caverns containing stalactites, stalagmites and drapery and can be walked through from one entrance to the other in one hour at a leisurely pace. Near the Ananui Creek entrance, a partially submerged grotto is inhabited by glowworms and cave wētā. The grotto can be accessed by foot on dry ground along the edges.

Cave rafting tours explore the wetter parts of the cave system on inflatable tubes, continuing down the gentle rapids of the Nile River.

== See also ==
- Caving in New Zealand
- List of caves in New Zealand
