= Billy Fox =

Billy Fox may refer to:

- Billy Fox (politician) (1939–1974), Irish Fine Gael politician
- Billy Fox (boxer) (1926–1986), American light heavyweight boxer

== See also ==
- Billie Fox, married name of Billie Piper (born 1982), English actress and former singer
- William Fox (disambiguation)
- Bill Fox (disambiguation)
