= Stockport Sunday School =

Sunday school in Manchester, England

Coordinates: 53°24′28″N 2°09′26″W

The Stockport Sunday School is a Sunday school in Stockport, Greater Manchester, England. Founded in 1784, it had become the largest Sunday school in the world by 1859. The original school was situated on London Square, Wellington Street, Stockport, behind the town hall. Before the days of universal education, children would be employed in the cotton and hatting industry from a very early age, Sunday Schools provided the one source of Education available before the passing of the Elementary Education Act 1870 (33 & 34 Vict. c. 75).

The school still exists today on Nangreave Rd in Heaviley, though it is far reduced in size.

== Foundation ==
The Sunday School was founded in 1784, the articles of association being adopted on 11 November 1784 (241 years ago). The aim was that the town be divided into six, and an establishment provided for each division. Two subscribers should visit each school and report back to the committee. Scholars should attend from 9 to 12 in the morning, and from 1 to 6 in the afternoon, of which part would be attending a church service of their persuasion. Teachers were to be paid 1s 6d a day. They started with eleven schools, and twenty three teachers taught 700-800 children.

One of the schools abandoned the practice of paying teachers and encouraged a large number of unpaid volunteers to do the job. This was successful and it grew faster than the rest. The consequent need for extra books, added to an increase of rent and other expenses, occasioned a demand beyond its proportion of the public subscription. These circumstances led to this school becoming a separate institution independent of the rest, though agreeing with them in the general object, the mode of instruction, the books in use, and the subjects admitted. In the year 1794, a separate committee published a report, entitling the institution, by way of distinction, the Methodists’ Sunday School, most of its promoters and active supporters being of that denomination. That report stated the number of scholars to be 695.

In 1805, £6,000 was raised from subscription, and a school large enough to accommodate 5,000 scholars was built on London Square. The school belonged to the town rather than a particular church. The building, austere in design, was 132 feet in length and 57 feet in width. The ground floor and first storey were each divided into 12 rooms; the second storey was fitted up for assembling the whole of the children for public worship, or on other occasions; having two tiers of windows, and a gallery on each side extending about half the length of the building. In order to aid both the hearing and sight in this long room, the floor rose in an inclined plane about halfway. There was also an orchestra with an organ behind the pulpit.

Stockport Sunday School predates the founding of the Sunday School Society of 1786.

== Prominence ==
The Sunday School, though nominally inter-denominational, was a Protestant institution. It was certainly seen as a threat to the establishment. Indeed, in 1811, a Mr Myddleton, vicar of St Thomas', Heaton Norris, reported to the Bishop:

The Methodists and Calvinists together make about a half of the number of inhabitants. The former much increased of late owing principally to this district bordering upon Stockport, which is considered as the focus of Methodism, and where is a Sunday School erected chiefly through their means, and capable of containing they say four thousand children.

Up until the cotton famine, and the Elementary Education Act 1870 (33 & 34 Vict. c. 75) it would be the only source of education for many children. Children would start helping their parents as young as five, and well before ten they would be subject to a fourteen-hour working day. The Health and Morals of Apprentices Act 1802 had attempted to ensure children were instructed in reading, writing and religion but it was not effectively policed. This left the Sunday school, and in 1842 a local directory reports:

One of the Sunday-schools ‘the Stockport Sunday-school,’ was not exclusively connected with any denomination. The Bible was used as the school book, and the children were taken alternately to church and to dissenting places of worship. This school, with four branches, had, in 1833, 5,244 scholars, about half of each sex. It was supported by subscription, and was under the management of a committee elected from among the subscribers of a guinea and upwards, and of visitors chosen from among the persons actively engaged in the school. There were two libraries, a teachers’ library of 850 volumes, and a scholars’ library of 1,700. There were connected with the school a religious tract society which circulated yearly 30,000 tracts, and a Bible association which distributed yearly about 400 copies of the Scriptures. There were no paid officers connected with the institution.

The school had its own choir, orchestra and music library, it was also had many active sports teams and a growing reputation. The report for 1859 states the number of scholars belonging to this school made it the largest Sunday school in the world, with 3,781 scholars, and 435 teachers. In later years the people moved to Heaviley, leaving the National Sunday School and Centenary Hall vacant. The buildings were listed as a National Monument and were demolished around 1970.

The Stockport Sunday School's enormous registers (now at Stockport Central Library) testify that Stockport Sunday School catered for 3,000 children. The un-indexed registers 1789-1920 have their names and ages (Registers for the Stockport Sunday School, Cheshire, 1790–1877). Many families sent generation after generation of children to Stockport Sunday school, the age range being from three years to late teenage.

== Manslaughter of George Burgess ==
On 11 April 1861, two eight-year-old boys recently suspended from the school, Peter Barrett and James Bradley, killed two-year-old George Burgess. The toddler was abducted from and smothered in a pool of water near Love Lane. He was last seen by his father, a powerloom weaver, near the Star Inn in Higher Hillgate; the child was being looked after by a nurse when he went missing. Peter Barrett and James Bradley had taken the toddler before stripping him, beating him with sticks, and then suffocating him in the brook. They had been challenged but not stopped by two residents and in court admitted to the crime, blaming each other. There had been a precursor to this incident: on 31 March the pair had been suspended from Stockport Sunday School when they had ripped up two Bibles and other children's caps.

James Bradley served 4½ years in the Bradwall Reformatory School, and Peter Barrett was sent to a Reformatory in Warwickshire. George Burgess was buried at Christ Church, Heaton Norris.
