= Rocky Mountain Bible Mission =

American rural evangelical organization

- Formation: 1957
- Executive Director: Peter Wetendorf
- Website: rmbible.org

Rocky Mountain Bible Mission (RMBM) is an evangelical organization that provides leadership for rural churches in Montana and northern Idaho. It was founded by Darrel and Betty Burch in 1957, as an offshoot of the American Sunday School Union. The executive director is Peter Wetendorf.

According to Carlene Cross, RMBM teaches that the Bible represents "the exact words of God".
