= William Fox (deacon) =

Founder of the sunday school society

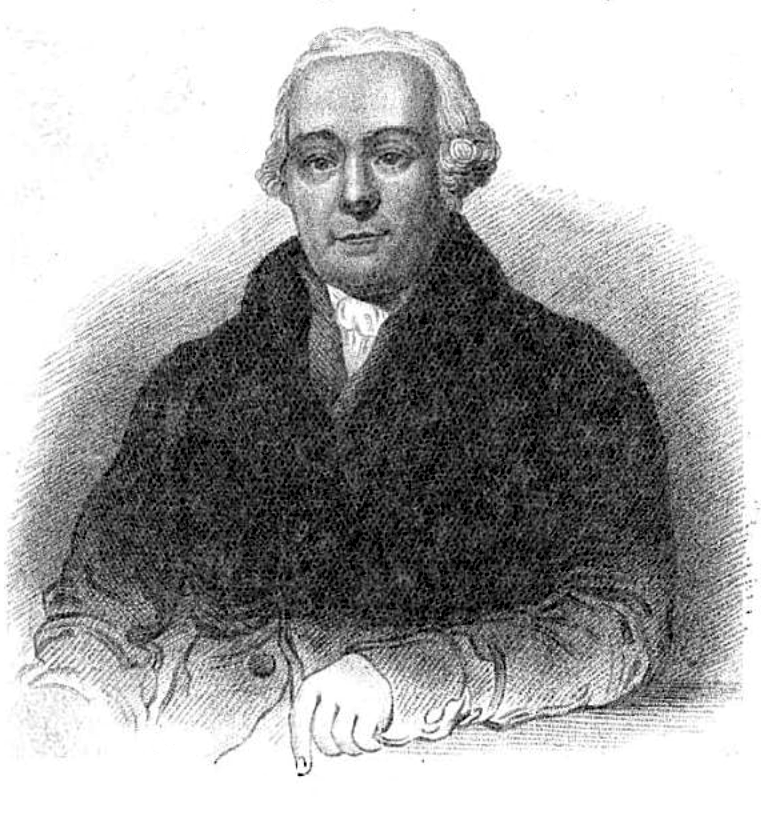
William Fox

William Fox (14 February 1736 – 1 April 1826) was an English businessman, Baptist minister and founder of the Sunday School Society.

== Life ==
Fox was born in 1736 in Clapton, Gloucestershire, the youngest of eight children of J. Fox, a tenant farmer on the Clapton Manor estate. He was left fatherless in early childhood, and the eldest son took over the farm. He is said to have had extraordinary resolution, and that at the age of ten formed business plans which were afterwards completely realised. He ultimately became lord of the manor of Clapton. Fox was apprenticed to a draper and mercer in Oxford in 1752; it is related that before the expiration of his indentures his master gave up to him his house and shop and stock of goods, valued at about £4,000.

Fox married in 1761 the eldest daughter of Jonathan Tabor, a Colchester merchant. Three years later he moved to London, and entered upon a wholesale business in Leadenhall Street, moving later to Cheapside. Becoming aware of the degradation of the poorer classes of the population, he endeavoured unsuccessfully, by lobbying members of both houses of parliament, to move the government in their behalf. He was a deacon of the Particular Baptists' Prescot Street Chapel, and spoke at the monthly meetings of the Baptist Society in London. About 1784, when he became the proprietor of Clapton, he began his humanitarian work unaided, founding a free day school. Writing to Robert Raikes in 1785, he stated that long before the establishment of Sunday schools he had designed a system of universal education, but had met with little support from the clergy and laity, who were alarmed by the magnitude of the undertaking.

A meeting was held at Fox's instance in the Poultry, London, on 16 August 1785, when it was resolved to issue a circular recommending the formation of a society for the establishment and support of Sunday schools throughout the kingdom of Great Britain. Fox was supported by Raikes, Jonas Hanway, and other friends of education, and the result was the foundation of the Sunday School Society, with a body of officers and governors, and a committee of twenty-four persons, chosen equally from the church of England and the various bodies of protestant dissenters. The Earl of Salisbury was elected president.

Eight months later, thirty schools had been established, containing 1,110 children, and by the following January (1787) these had been increased to 147 schools with 7,242 children. In later years the Society declined, and was eventually absorbed into the Sunday School Union.

In 1797 the Baptist Home Missionary Society was formed, with Fox as treasurer. Fox bought in 1807 the manor of Lechlade, Gloucestershire, living there until 1823, when he moved to Cirencester. Fox died in Cirencester on 1 April 1826, and was buried at Lechlade beside his wife and daughter.
