= Westland North =

Westland North was a parliamentary electorate on the West Coast of New Zealand from 1868 to 1870.

== History ==
The Westland Representation Act 1867 introduced changes to the Waimea and Westland electorates. Their areas were reassigned and four electorates formed. Waimea lost some area, but continued to exist. Westland was abolished in 1867. A new electorate (Westland Boroughs) was established, and the Act stipulated that the sitting member (William Sefton Moorhouse) was transferred to it. Other new electorates, for which by-elections were to be held, were Westland North and Westland South. The southern boundary of Westland North was the southern boundary of Nelson Province: the course of the Grey River near the coast and an arbitrary straight line in the country's interior (reflecting that the land had been unexplored at the time the boundary was defined).

Timothy Gallagher was the first representative, elected in 1868 supplementary election. He resigned in 1870 owing to urgent and private business affairs. Thomas Kynnersley won the resulting by-election unopposed. Kynnersley retired at the end of the parliamentary term, and the electorate was abolished.

At the end of the 4th Parliament, the 1870 electoral redistribution disestablished all special interest electorates (e.g. the goldfields electorates) and Westland North was divided amongst two new and one existing electorate: Grey Valley, Buller, and an enlarged Waimea.

== Members of Parliament ==
Westland North was represented by two Members of Parliament:

Election	Winner
1868 supplementary election	Timothy Gallagher (Independent)
1870 by-election	Thomas Kynnersley (Independent)
(Electorate abolished in 1870; see Grey Valley, Buller, and Waimea)

== Election results ==
=== 1868 supplementary election ===
1868 Westland North election
Party	Candidate	Votes	%	±%
Independent	Timothy Gallagher	597	67.0	
Independent	George Horne	270	30.3	
Independent	George Donne	24	2.7	
Turnout		891		
Majority		327		
