= Awakari River =

Location
- Country: New Zealand

Physical characteristics
- Mouth
  - coordinates: 41°55′17″S 171°28′24″E

The Awakari River is a river in the West Coast district of the South Island of New Zealand. It is a tributary of the Waitakere / Nile River.

== See also ==
- List of rivers of New Zealand
