= Sunday School Union =

British religious organization

The Sunday School Union was a British ecumenical organisation devoted to promoting Sunday schools in Britain and abroad.

== History ==
The Sunday School Union had been set up on 13 July 1803 "to encourage teachers to communicate with each other, improve methods, and support the opening of new schools". Over the years, local auxiliaries were set up in London and then around the country. These became "local Unions affiliated to the now termed ‘National Sunday School Union’ (NSSU)".

The address of the Sunday School Union in the early years of the 20th century was 57 and 59 Ludgate Hill, London, E.C. The office of the National Sunday School Union was located at the same address in the late 1920s.

In 1964, the latter organisation became the National Christian Education Council which in 2002 combined with the Christian Education Movement to form Christian Education.

The Canadian branch (the Sunday School Union Society of Canada) was established in Montreal in 1822.

== Book series published by Sunday School Union ==
- Daring Deeds Library
- Endeavour Library Series
- Gift Books for Girls and Boys
- Great Biographies
- Green Nursery Series
- Heroines Library
- Little Dot Series
- Red Nursery Series
- Splendid Lives Series
- Toy Books
- Tracts for Teachers
- Wonderful Shilling Library
- Youth's Own Library

== See also ==
- Deseret Sunday School Union
- InFaith – formerly American Sunday School Union (ASSU) and the American Missionary Fellowship
- Sunday School Society
