= Charleston, New Zealand =

Locality on the West Coast of the South Island of New Zealand

Charleston
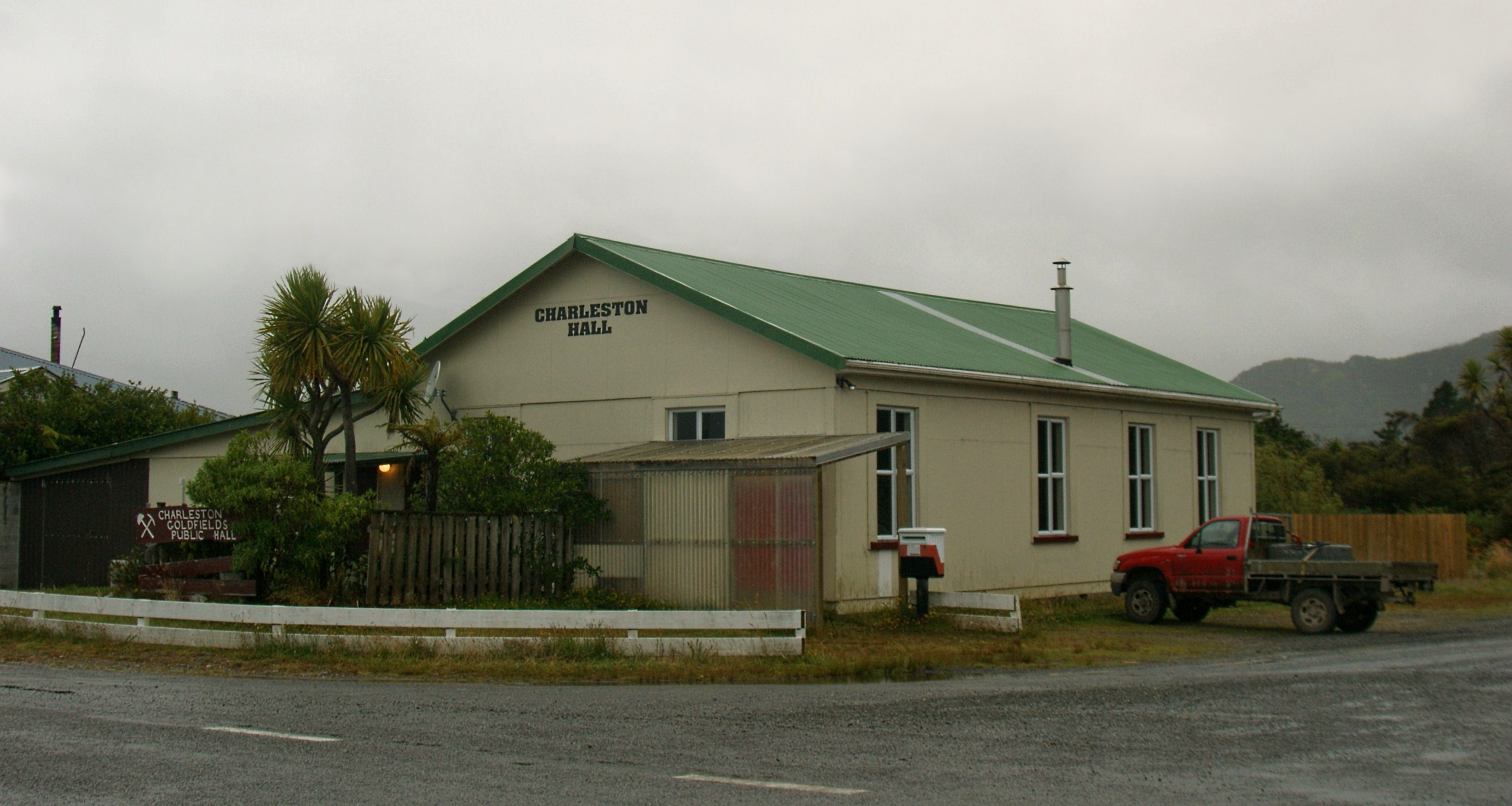
- The Charleston Goldfields Public Hall
- Interactive map of Charleston
- Coordinates: 41°54′25″S 171°26′17″E
- Country: New Zealand
- Region: West Coast
- District: Buller District
- Ward: Westport
- Electorates: West Coast-Tasman; Te Tai Tonga

Government
  - Territorial Authority: Buller District Council
  - Regional council: West Coast Regional Council
  - Mayor of Buller: Chris Russell
  - West Coast-Tasman MP: Maureen Pugh
  - Te Tai Tonga MP: Tākuta Ferris

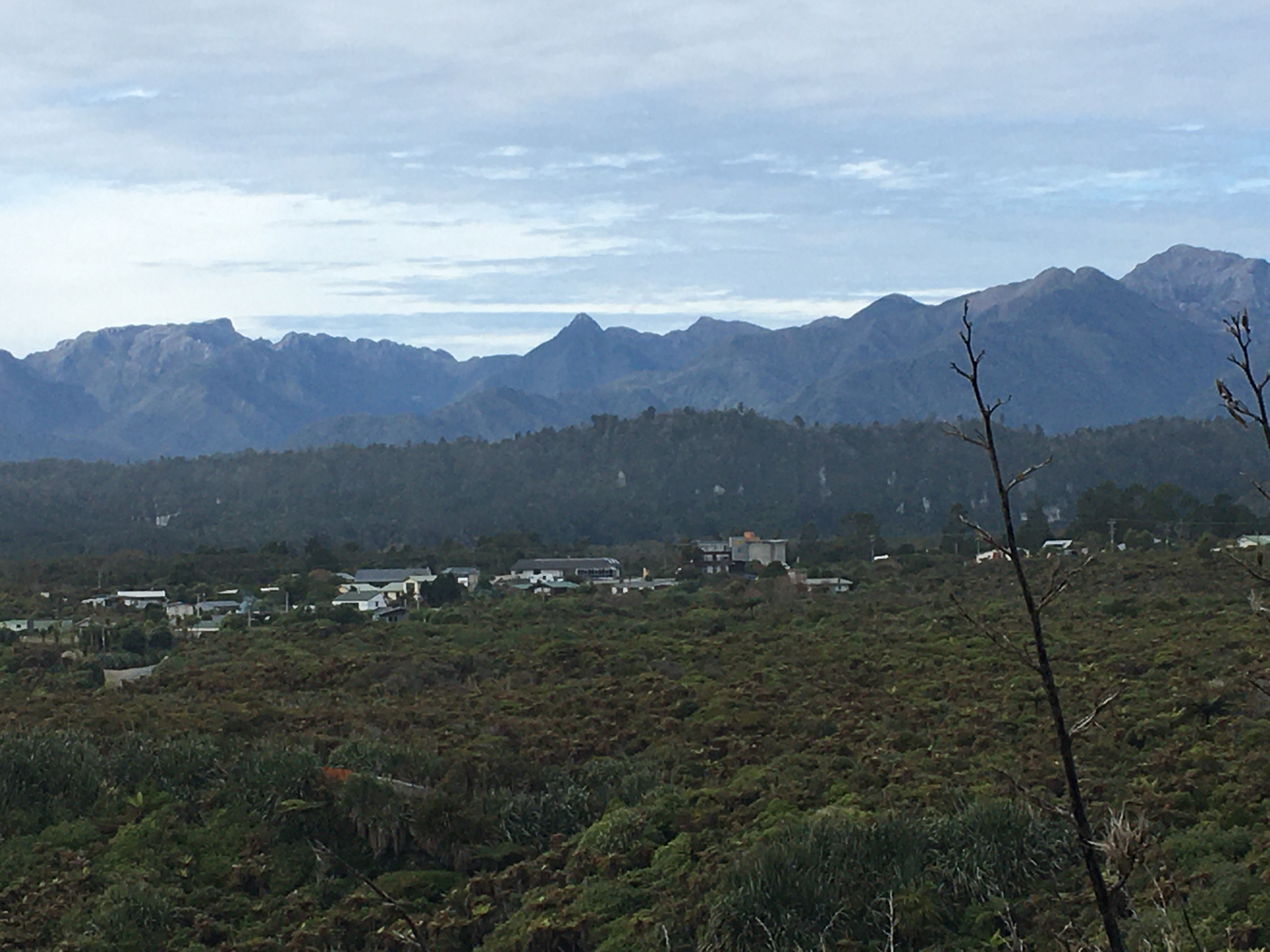
Charleston with Paparoa Mountains in the background

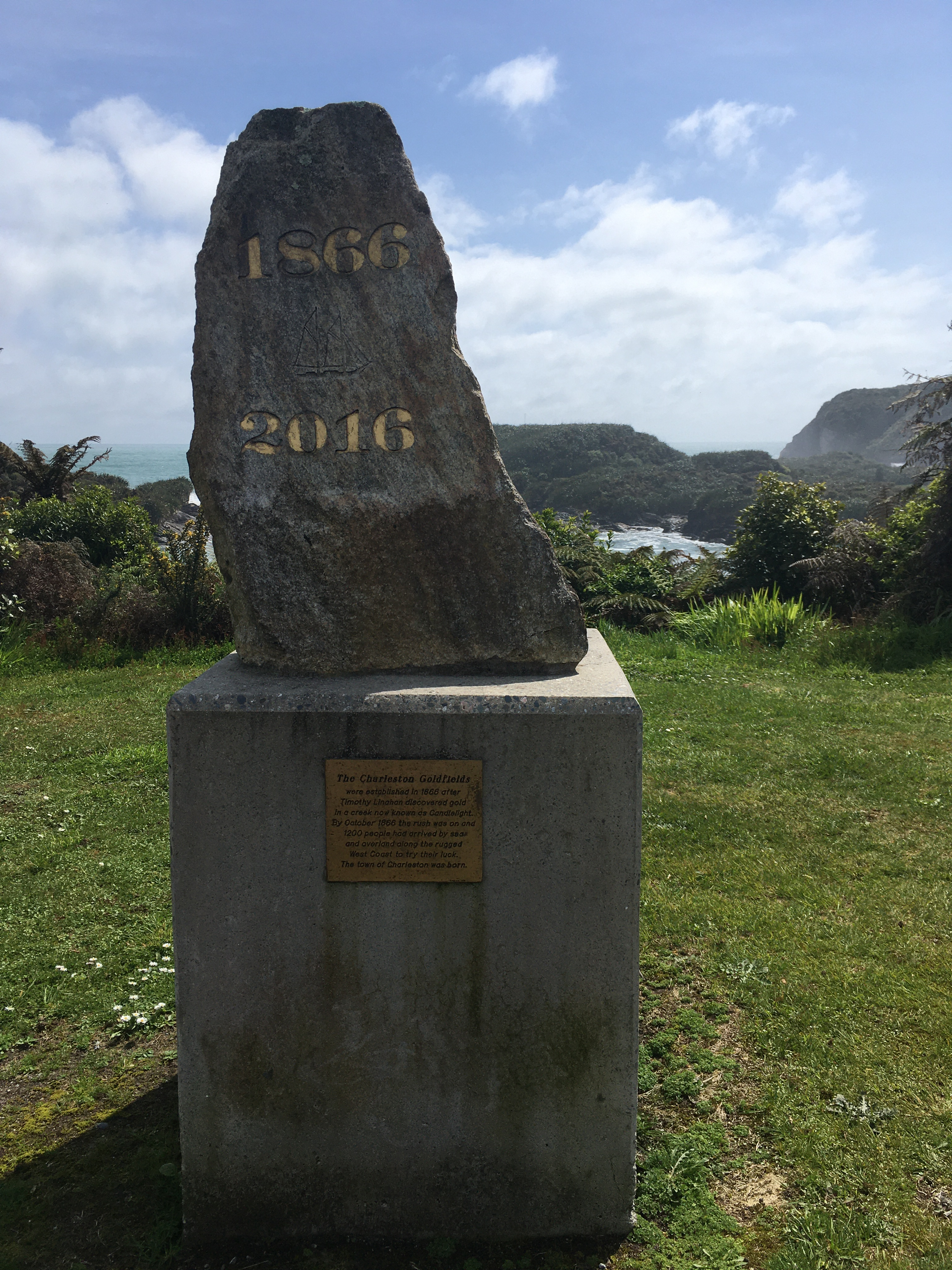
Monument to gold mining history

Charleston is a village in the South Island of New Zealand, located 30 km south of Westport on the west coast. It was founded as a goldmining town after a major goldrush in 1867, and is now an adventure tourist village noted for its extensive limestone caves and caving experiences. Guided tours of the nearby Metro Cave / Te Ananui Cave are operated out of Charleston and travel up the Waitakere / Nile River valley.

== History ==
Charleston's origins owe much to gold prospector William Fox. He was born in Ireland in about 1826 and as a young man became a sailor, then a gold prospector.

In 1862 Bill Fox's prospecting activities in the Arrow district excited intense interest. In 1864, Fox travelled to the West Coast. He prospected widely for gold and first discovered it at Fox Creek, a tributary of the Arahura River behind Hokitika, in January 1865.

According to local historian Les Wright, in July 1866 Fox organised a prospecting voyage to what was later named Fox River but didn't find gold there. He led the party on 20 km north to where Charleston would later be, but although they found gold in the sand there, it was too fine to save. So Fox went south to Ōkārito to find out how the miners there were extracting it from fine sand.

In August 1866, while Fox was away, took the credit for the Pakihi ('Parkeese') field which later became known as the Charleston field. At first, goods going to 'Parkeese' were landed at Woodpecker Bay, south of Fox River, and humped about 20 km north to the goldfield. Then Capt Charles Bonner managed to squeeze the ketch 'Constant' into a tiny bay near 'Parkeese' and the town that formed around this new landing spot, Constant Bay, was named Charleston, probably in his honour. Reed (2002) indicates that the community was originally known as 'Charlie's Town', and then 'Charles Town', before settling on the current name. Unlike its more famous American namesake, the town's name is generally pronounced with three syllables (/ˈtʃɑːrləstən/).

In November 1866 Fox made a rich strike at Brighton (now Tiromoana), about 10 miles south of Charleston, and in May 1867 a strike near Charleston itself precipitated the last real 'rush' on the West Coast. Brighton was a much bigger town at the start, but Charleston lasted longer and the two have been confused in places. In 1867 Brighton and its environs had 53 hotels while Charleston had 37. However, in 1975-79 remains of around 99 hotels where found by old bottle collectors in the Charleston area which have been documented, with the European hotel the last surviving hotel which was pulled down after the 100 year festivities around 1968. Hannahs shoe shop chain had the very first shop in Charleston in 1867. Marys hotel at the south end of the nine mile beach to the north of Charleston being said to be gateway to Charleston which was also pulled down around 1970. Open cast Coal mines replaced gold mining in Charleston with the Mowarts mine and later the McLaughlin mine which supplied coal to nearby Westport, Gold was still mined on the south end of the nine mile beach up till the late 1970s. In 1990s the seals from Cape Foulwind near Westport moved south to the Charleston coast and made camp at the mouth of the Bromielaw creek about 2 km south of Constant bay. Three ship wrecks have been located around the mouths of both Constant bay and its neighbour Joyce bay which are believed to be from the gold rush times. Charleston was the site for the first cement buildings in New Zealand; a Butter factory and a small house which still stands around 3 km south of Charleston next to Cake hill. The Waitakere / Nile river still has the Cement walls on the river of the old swing bridge which was the main road through the coast in 1899. Charleston is littered with old gold workings and one should watch for old mining shafts which are hidden throughout the area. Charleston has got coal, clay, and sandstone deposits which all have been mined over the years. Wellington's post master got a promotion to the Charleston Post office in 1867 which was a big step up in his career at the time. The Charleston school was moved to the Westport south school and the old school teacher's house (which still stands) was also the Charleston Police station and Charleston jail beforehand.

The population of Charleston during the goldrush is often exaggerated with 30,000 or even 100,000 being mentioned. At the peak of the gold rush, the population of the entire West Coast is believed to have been only 35,000. The early 1867 census, at the peak of the Charleston rush, showed 5,000 on the entire Charleston field and 6,000 on the Brighton field ten miles to the south.

== Geography ==
The Waitakere or Nile River emerges just north of Charleston from an area rich in limestone cliffs and caves. Cave and rafting tours operate from Charleston into the Nile River valley, including a short bush tram track for part of the transport. The Fox River 30 km south of Charleston is named after William Fox.

== Demographics ==
Charleston statistical area, which includes Cape Foulwind, covers 1,015.50 km^{2} (392.09 sq mi) and had an estimated population of 700 as of June 2025, with a population density of 0.69 people per km^{2}.

Historical population for the statistical area
Year	Pop.	±% p.a.
2006	516	—
2013	657	+3.51%
2018	522	−4.50%
2023	669	+5.09%

The statistical area had a population of 669 in the 2023 New Zealand census, an increase of 147 people (28.2%) since the 2018 census, and an increase of 12 people (1.8%) since the 2013 census. There were 339 males, 324 females, and 6 people of other genders in 366 dwellings. 3.1% of people identified as LGBTIQ+. The median age was 53.1 years (compared with 38.1 years nationally). There were 96 people (14.3%) aged under 15 years, 60 (9.0%) aged 15 to 29, 333 (49.8%) aged 30 to 64, and 180 (26.9%) aged 65 or older.

People could identify as more than one ethnicity. The results were 91.5% European (Pākehā); 12.6% Māori; 3.1% Asian; 0.9% Middle Eastern, Latin American and African New Zealanders (MELAA); and 3.6% other, which includes people giving their ethnicity as "New Zealander". English was spoken by 99.6%, Māori by 1.3%, and other languages by 8.1%. No language could be spoken by 0.4% (e.g. too young to talk). The percentage of people born overseas was 18.8, compared with 28.8% nationally.

Religious affiliations were 22.4% Christian, 0.4% Hindu, 1.3% Buddhist, 0.9% New Age, and 1.8% other religions. People who answered that they had no religion were 64.1%, and 9.0% of people did not answer the census question.

Of those at least 15 years old, 105 (18.3%) people had a bachelor's or higher degree, 333 (58.1%) had a post-high school certificate or diploma, and 135 (23.6%) people exclusively held high school qualifications. The median income was $30,200, compared with $41,500 nationally. 39 people (6.8%) earned over $100,000 compared to 12.1% nationally. The employment status of those at least 15 was 240 (41.9%) full-time, 111 (19.4%) part-time, and 15 (2.6%) unemployed.
