= Hannah Ball =

English Wesleyan methodist

Hannah Ball (1734–1792) was an English Wesleyan methodist and pioneer of the Sunday school.

== Life ==
Ball was born on 13 March 1734. When John Wesley and other Methodist preachers visited High Wycombe, in Bucks where she lived for most of her life, she was attracted by their teaching. In 1766 she began to keep a diary, some extracts of which have been published. Several of the letters that passed between her and Wesley have also been printed. By Wesley's advice she broke off an engagement to be married to one who, in the language of the sect, was 'an ungodly man.' She was a mystic, and Wesley warns her that 'a clear revelation of several persons in the ever blessed Trinity was by no means a sure trial to Christian perfection.'

Hannah Ball died on 16 August 1792.

== Sunday schools ==
In 1769 she began a Sunday school. It was continued by her sister Anne, was reorganised in 1801, and lasted late into the nineteenth century.

The germ of the modern Sunday school may be traced in the methods of instruction established by Luther, John Knox, and St. Charles Borromeo. There are traces of them in France in the seventeenth century. The Rev. Joseph Alleine was in the habit of drawing young pupils together for instruction on the Sunday. Bishop Thomas Wilson instituted such schools in the Isle of Man in 1703. The Seventh Day Baptists had one between 1740 and 1747 at Euphrata, Pennsylvania.

In 1763 Mrs. Catharine Cappe and the Rev. Theophilus Lindsey had such a gathering of the young at Catterick. Dr. Kennedy, about 1770, established one in Bright parish, co. Down. In 1778 the Rev. David Simpson opened one at Macclesfield. There was another at Little Lever, taught by 'Owd Jemmy o' th' Hey,' whose services were paid for by a wealthy piper-maker, Adam Crompton. These and others preceded the experiment made at Gloucester in 1783 by Robert Raikes, who is often described as the founder of Sunday schools.
