= William R. Fox =

- Civil War era Army Medal of Honor
- Born: c. 1837; Philadelphia, Pennsylvania
- Died: June 6, 1888; Philadelphia, Pennsylvania
- Burial place: Hillside Cemetery; Roslyn, Pennsylvania
- Military career
- Allegiance: United States of America
- Branch: Union Army
- Rank: Private
- Units: Company A, 95th Pennsylvania Volunteer Infantry
- Conflicts: Third Battle of Petersburg
- Awards: Medal of Honor

Private William R. Fox (c. 1837 - June 6, 1888) was an American soldier who fought in the American Civil War. Fox received the country's highest award for bravery during combat, the Medal of Honor, for his action during the Third Battle of Petersburg in Virginia on 2 April 1865. He was honored with the award on 28 March 1879.

== Biography ==
Fox was born in Philadelphia, Pennsylvania, in about 1837. Fox's trade was that of a bricklayer. He was residing at 517 South 15th Street at the time of his death, after living for some years with his family at 1528 Dean Street in Philadelphia, PA. Fox was residing on Dean Street in 1879 when he was awarded the Medal of Honor.

== Military service ==
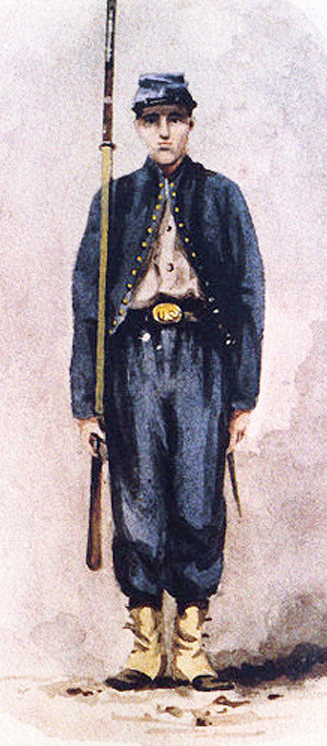

Fox enlisted in Company A, 95th Pennsylvania Infantry on September 21, 1861, at Philadelphia, Pennsylvania. He re-enlisted December 27, 1863, in Virginia and was promoted to Corporal on June 1, 1864. He was mustered out at war's end on July 17, 1865.

== Medal of Honor citation ==
Rank and organization: Private, Company A, 95th Pennsylvania Infantry, Place and date: At Petersburg, Va., 2 April 1865, Date of issue: 28 March 1879.

Fox's official Medal of Honor citation reads:

The President of the United States of America, in the name of Congress, takes pleasure in presenting the Medal of Honor to Private William R. Fox, United States Army, for extraordinary heroism on 2 April 1865, while serving with Company A, 95th Pennsylvania Infantry, in action at Petersburg, Virginia. Private Fox bravely assisted in the capture of one of the enemy's guns; with the first troops to enter the city, captured the flag of the Confederate customhouse.

== Death and burial ==
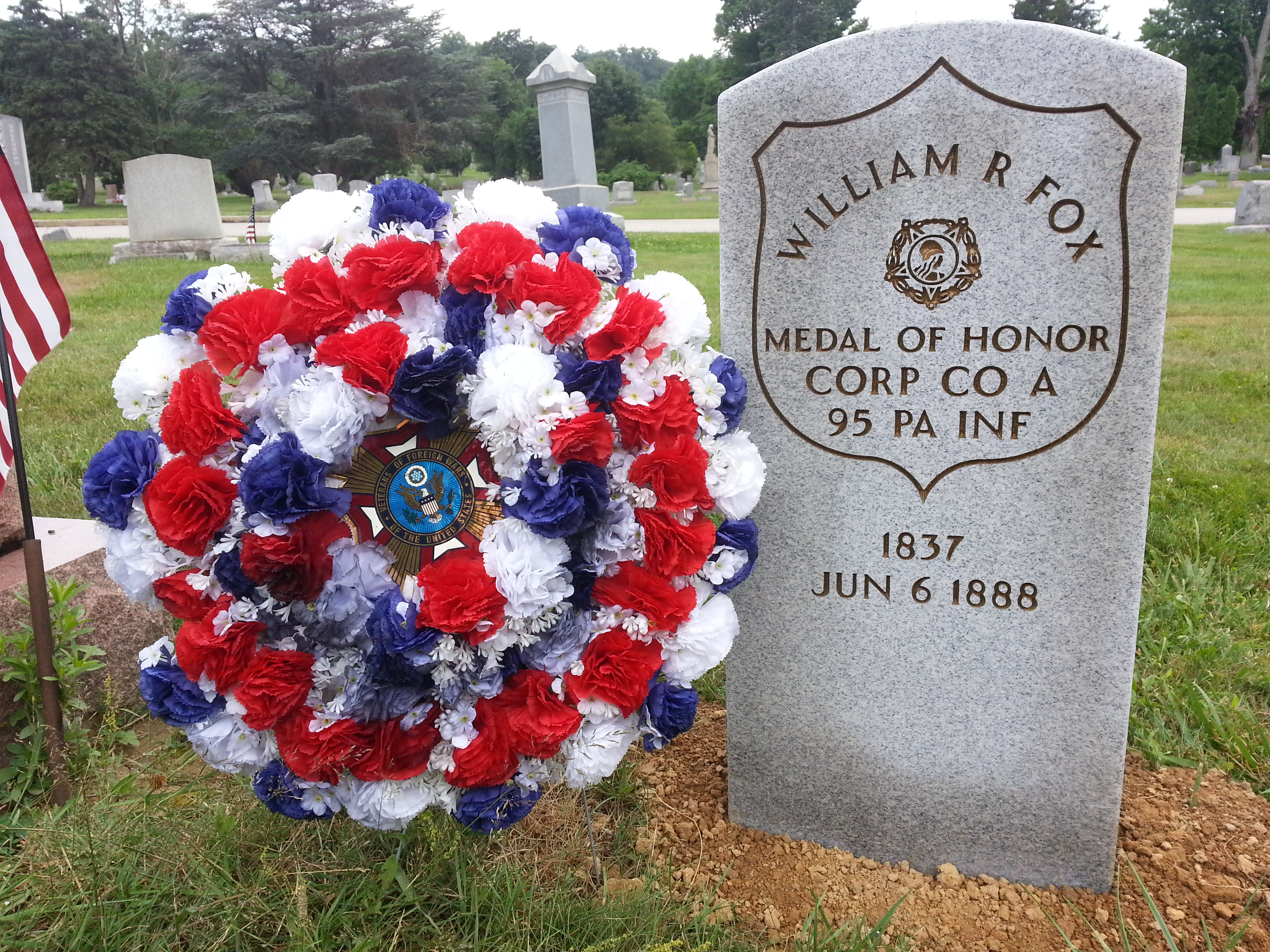
Image of William R. Fox's MOH gravestone

Medal of Honor recipient William R. Fox died June 6, 1888, of intestinal inflammation and was initially buried June 8, 1888, at the now defunct Odd Fellows Cemetery in Philadelphia, Pennsylvania. His remains were removed May 31, 1899, to Hillside Cemetery, Roslyn, Pennsylvania. Burial plot: Section C, lot 527, grave 5, GPS (lat/lon): 40.1221, -75.1384

== See also ==
- List of American Civil War Medal of Honor recipients: A–F
