= InFaith =

American Christian organization

- Formation: 1817
- Executive Director: Jerry Iamurri
- Website: infaith.org
- Formerly called: American Sunday School Union; American Missionary Fellowship

InFaith has its roots in the First Day Society (founded 1790). InFaith officially formed in 1817 as the “Sunday and Adult School Union.” In 1824, the organization changed its name to American Sunday School Union (ASSU). Then, in 1974, the ASSU changed its name to American Missionary Fellowship. It became "InFaith" on September 1, 2011.

== History ==
With roots in the First Day Society (founded 1790), the InFaith officially formed in 1817 as the "Sunday and Adult School Union". In addition to its primary work of starting Sunday schools in rural communities, the Sunday and Adult School Union became known for its publications and its ticket reward system for Sunday school students who memorized Scripture. Several people influential in the United States during the 19th century, including Francis Scott Key, Associate Supreme Court Justice Bushrod Washington, and U.S. Mint Director James Pollock, served as officers of the mission; many others supported the mission in other ways.

In 1824, the organization changed its name to "American Sunday School Union" (ASSU). Its initial efforts were directed at frontier areas. In 1830, the ASSU began the Mississippi Valley Enterprise, through which missionaries worked to "establish a Sunday-school in every destitute place where it is practicable throughout the Valley of the Mississippi" within two years. "Stuttering Stephen" Paxton, perhaps the most well known ASSU missionary, took part in this. He started 1,314 Sunday schools during his twenty years of service with the mission.

Eventually, the ASSU grew beyond starting Sunday schools to include church planting, Christian camping, and other ministries. In 1974, the ASSU changed its name to "American Missionary Fellowship" to reflect this broader ministry range. Under this name, the mission continued to start new evangelical works in overlooked communities across the United States.

In 2011, a final name change to "InFaith" was made.

According to InFaith's website: "Contemporary InFaith field staff members work in a variety of ministries in rural and urban areas, focusing particularly on places overlooked or underserved by other evangelistic ministries. While InFaith has grown well beyond its original goal of starting Sunday schools for poor children, the mission faithfully continues to convey the unchanging truth of God’s Word to a changing culture."
