= Sunday School Society =

British Sunday school organization

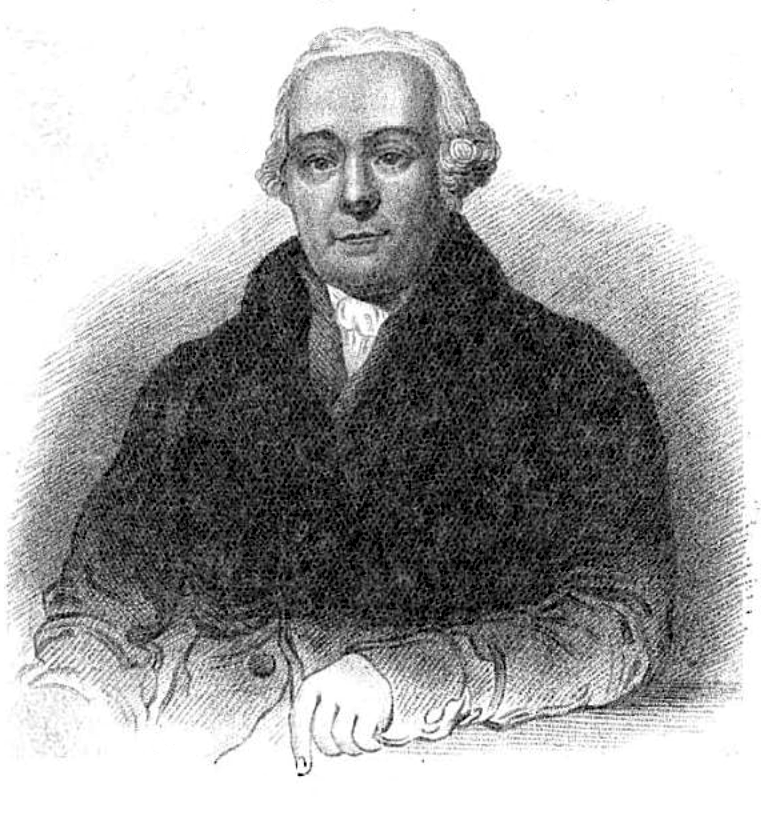
William Fox, founder of the society

The Sunday School Society was a British association of Sunday schools.

== History ==
It was founded by Baptist deacon William Fox on 7 September 1785 in Prescott Street Baptist Church of London. The latter had been touched by articles by the editor of the Gloucester Journal, Robert Raikes, on the problems of youth crime. Pastor Thomas Stock and Raikes have thus registered a hundred children from six to fourteen years old. Bible reading lessons were given by volunteer teachers in the morning and catechism took place in the afternoon. The society has published its textbooks and brought together nearly 4,000 Sunday schools.

== See also ==
- Sunday School Union
