= Waitakere / Nile River =

River in New Zealand

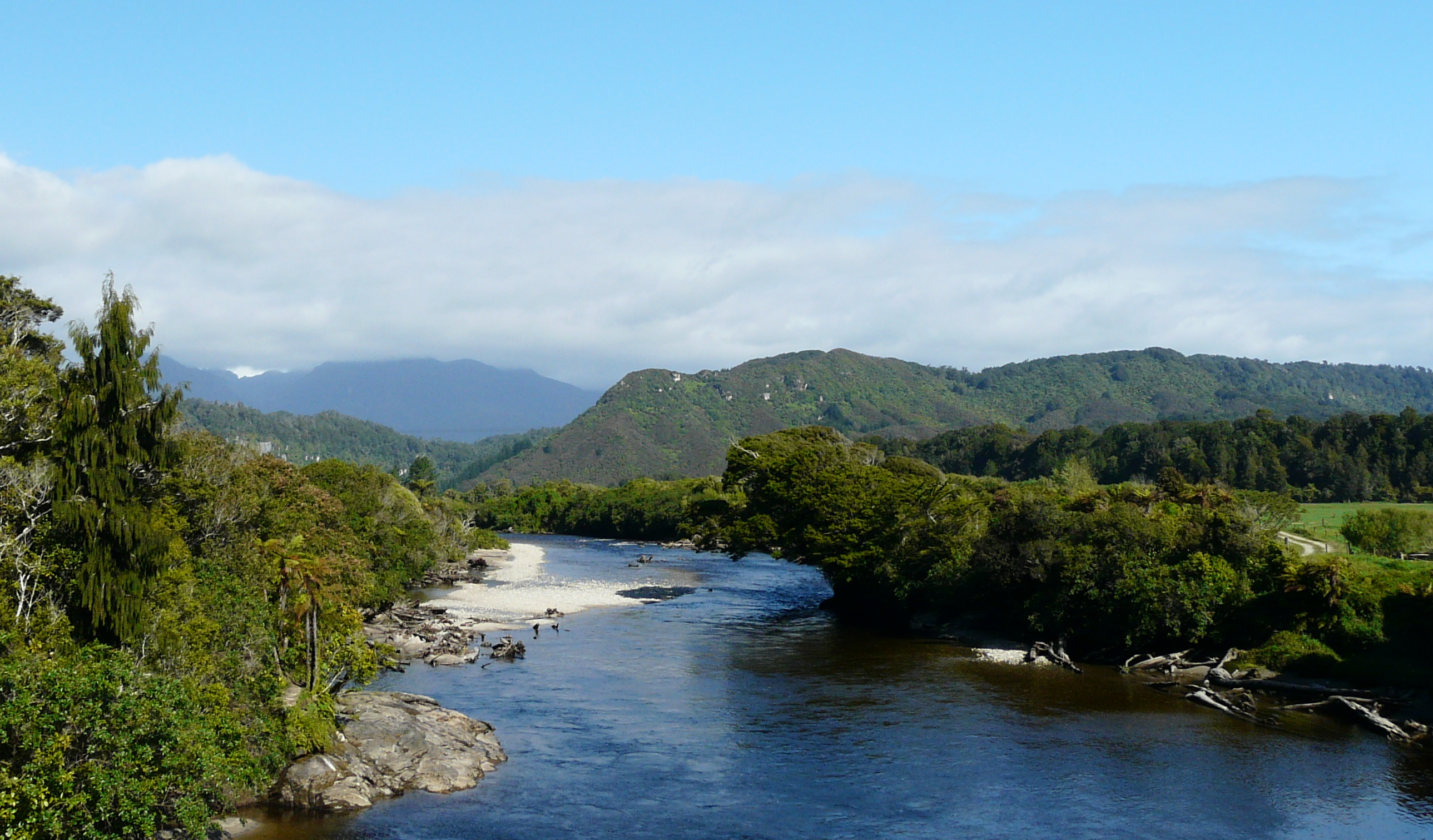
- The Waitakere / Nile River as viewed from State Highway 6
- Route of the Waitakere / Nile River
- Mouth of the Waitakere / Nile River Waitakere / Nile River (New Zealand)
- Etymology: Named after Takere, a prominent figure in the war party of Te Pūoho. Named by Europeans for the Nile.
- Native name: Ngāwaitakere (Māori)

Location
- Country: New Zealand
- Region: West Coast
- District: Buller

Physical characteristics
- Source: Paparoa Range
  - location: Near The Pinnacle
  - coordinates: 42°03′48″S 171°35′02″E
  - elevation: 1,120 metres (3,670 ft)
- Mouth: Tasman Sea
  - location: Little Beach
  - coordinates: 41°53′48″S 171°26′39″E
  - elevation: 0 metres (0 ft)
- Length: 29 kilometres (18 mi)

Basin features
- Progression: Waitakere / Nile River → Tasman Sea
- Tributaries
  - left: Makirikiri Stream, Darkies Creek
  - right: Atbara Creek, Ananui Creek, Awakiri River
- Bridges: State Highway 6, foot and cycle suspension bridge.

The Waitakere / Nile River is a river on the West Coast of New Zealand's South Island. It rises in the Paparoa Range and flows through a limestone karst landscape in a roughly northwest direction for its entire length, reaching the Tasman Sea just north of Charleston. The river and its surrounds are a popular tourist destination, particularly for a bush train along the river's canyon and caving through the nearby Metro / Te Ananui Caves. The lower reaches of the river are also a popular fishing spot, particularly for brown trout.

== History ==
Originally known to local Māori as Ngāwaitakere after Takere, a prominent figure in the war party of Te Pūoho-o-te-rangi which passed through the area on their way south in 1833, the river was named as the Nile by early Pākehā in the area during the late 1850s or early 1860s. The etymology of this is unclear, with sources attributing it either to John Rochfort in 1859 after three pyramid-shaped hills near the river, or to the SS Nile, which became the first European ship to enter the river in 1866.

Following the discovery of gold in the area in 1866 and the subsequent founding of Charleston, increased activity around the river prompted the construction of early bridges and other infrastructure. The first of these was a rough log bridge funded by settlers in Charleston and opened with a toll of one shilling in 1867. This was replaced in 1870 due to damage from driftwood and again in 1875, when the replacement bridge was washed out. This third bridge lasted for 65 years, before eventually being replaced by the present day road bridge. In 2021, the foundations of the third bridge were used to construct a new suspension bridge for foot and cycle traffic, which now forms part of the Kawatiri Coastal Trail.

The area, particularly the river's canyon, was used as the backdrop for filming of the 2001 movie The Lost World.

== Geography ==
The Waitakere / Nile River is one of several roughly perpendicular rivers to flow from the western side of the Paparoa Range to the Tasman Sea, carving deep channels in the region's Whaingaroan limestone karst landscape in the process. The river starts on the eastern side of the range's main ridgeline on the slopes of The Pinnacle, flowing northeast between Mounts Faraday and Priestley through a narrow valley. Roughly a quarter of the way along its length, the river leaves the Paparoa Range, continuing to head northeast as it is joined by numerous unnamed tributaries. At roughly the 15 kilometres (9.3 mi) mark, the river is joined by the Atbara and Sirdar Creeks, both named for Lord Kitchener and in reference to the main river's European name.

Soon after this, the land around the river narrows and develops into a short canyon, estimated to have been formed during the last million years. Ananui Creek feeds into the river at this point by way of the Metro / Te Ananui Caves, forming a popular black water rafting route. At the northern end of the canyon the river is joined by the Awakari River, before entering a narrow coastal plain and meandering to the Tasman Sea at Little Beach. The canyon is also the location to a small bush train reminiscent of those used by early loggers in the area, built in 2002 to ferry tourists and rafters to the upper canyon and top of the nearby cave systems.
