= Timothy Gallagher (politician) =

New Zealand politician

New Zealand Parliament
Years	Term	Electorate	Party
1868–1870	4th	Westland North	Independent

Timothy Gallagher (1840 – 24 August 1888) was a 19th-century Member of Parliament from the West Coast, New Zealand.

Gallagher, born in 1840, was from County Donegal in Ireland.

He represented the Westland North electorate from 1868 to 1870, when he resigned owing to urgent and private business affairs. During his time in parliament, he had advocated for the abolition of the provincial government system. He and his wife had nine children.

Gallagher fell ill with a cold. After a week, he unexpectedly died from pulmonary edema on 24 August 1888 at his home in Westport.
