= Bill Fox (goldminer) =

New Zealand gold prospector and miner (1826/7–1890)

William Fox (c. 1827–9 April 1890) was a New Zealand gold prospector and goldminer. He was born in Ireland on c. 1827. After his discovery of gold in the Arrow River in Otago in 1862 the mining township that sprang up was briefly known as Fox's, before becoming Arrowtown.
