= Fell (surname) =

Fell is a surname. Notable people with the surname include:

- Alfred Fell (merchant) (1817–1871), early settler in New Zealand
- Alfred Fell (rugby union) (1878–1953), Scottish rugby player
- Alison Fell (born 1944), Scottish poet and novelist
- Anthony Fell (politician) (1914–1998), British politician
- Anthony S. Fell, Canadian businessman
- Arthur Fell (1850–1934), English solicitor and politician
- Barry Fell (1917–1994), zoologist and writer on epigraphy
- Bill Fell (1904–1986), New Zealand policeman
- Bob Fell (born 1930), Australian politician
- Charles Fell (1844–1918), New Zealand painter and politician
- Charles Fell (divine) (1687–1763), English Catholic priest
- Christine Fell (died 1998), English academic
- Clare Fell (1912–2002), British archaeologist
- Claude Fell (1892–1972), Australian footballer
- Dafydd Fell (born 1970), political scientist
- David Fell (1869–1956), Scottish-born Australian politician
- Derek Fell, writer and photographer of art, travel and gardening
- Desmond Fell (1912–1992), South African cricketer
- George Fell (1849–1918), American physician, worked on artificial ventilation and electrocution
- Gerry Fell (footballer, born 1898) (1898–1977), English footballer
- Gerry Fell (footballer, born 1951) (1951–2025), English footballer
- Gideon Fell, fictional character created by John Dickson Carr
- Graeme Fell, 3000 meters steeplechase runner
- Hans-Josef Fell, German politician
- Heather Fell, British modern pentathlete
- Henry Fell (fl. 1672), Quaker missionary and writer
- Honor Fell (1900–1986), British scientist and zoologist
- James Fell (disambiguation)
- Jeffrey Fell (born 1956), Canadian jockey
- Jesse Fell, American anthracite experimenter from Pennsylvania
- Jesse W. Fell, American businessman from Illinois
- Jimmy Fell (1936–2011), English footballer
- John Fell (bishop) (1625–1686), English churchman and academic
- John Fell (Canadian politician) (1819–1901), Canadian businessman, farmer and political figure from Ontario
- John Fell (drummer), American drummer
- John Fell (judge) (1721–1798), American merchant and jurist
- John Fell (tutor) (1735–1797), English congregationalist minister and classical tutor
- John Barraclough Fell (1815–1902), engineer
- John Fell (industrialist) (1862–1955), Scottish born Australian oil businessman
- Julian Fell, winning contestant from the British game show Countdown
- Júnior Fell (born 1992), Brazilian football player
- Laura Fell, known as Darla Aquista, a fictional character in comic books published by DC Comics
- Leonard Fell (died 1700), English Quaker
- Les Fell (1920–2010), English footballer
- Lloyd Fell (1920–1981), Canadian politician
- Margaret Fell or Margaret Fox (1614–1702), founding member of the Religious Society of Friends
- Mark Fell (cricketer) (born 1960), English cricketer
- Mary Fell (born 1947), American poet and academic
- Matthew Fell (1875–1957), Australian footballer
- Michael Fell (disambiguation)
- Norman Fell (1924–1998), American actor of film and television
- Patrick Fell (1940–2011), Roman Catholic priest, convicted of being a commander of an IRA active service unit
- R. A. L. Fell (1895–1973), British classical scholar and writer
- R. B. Fell, Commander of the Ceylon Defence Force
- Richard Fell, British diplomat
- Rita Fell (1935–2004), also known as Rita Mills, Australian singer
- Sam Fell, animator
- Samuel Fell (1584–1649), Dean of Christ Church, Oxford
- Shane Fell (born 1967), Australian footballer
- Simon Fell (politician), British politician
- Simon H. Fell, bassist and composer
- Stuart Fell, actor and stuntman
- Terry Fell (1921–2007), American country musician
- Thomas Fell (1598–1658), lawyer, politician and vice-chancellor of the duchy of Lancaster
- Tom Fell (born 1993), English cricketer
- Tony Fell (1931–2011), British businessman and musician
- Wilfred Fell (1879–1920), Australian footballer
- William Fell (writer) (1761–1848), English writer
- William Scott Fell (1866–1930), Australian shipping merchant and politician

== See also ==
- Fells (surname)
- Felle (disambiguation)
