= George Fell (mayor) =

New Zealand businessman and local politician

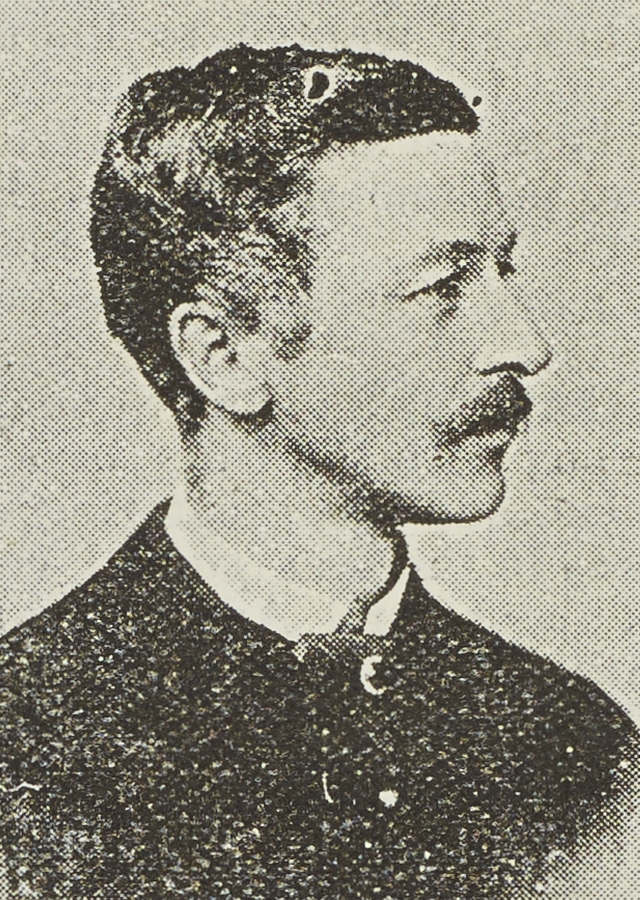

6th Mayor of Blenheim
- In office 1877–1879
- Preceded by: James Edward Hodson
- Succeeded by: Frederick Thomas Farmar

Personal details
- Born: Alfred George Fell; 12 August 1848 Nelson, New Zealand
- Died: 6 February 1917 (aged 68) Wellington, New Zealand
- Resting place: Karori Cemetery
- Parent: Alfred Fell (father)
- Relatives: Charles Fell (brother); Arthur Fell (brother); Walter Fell (brother); Alfred Fell (nephew); William Richmond Fell (nephew); Henry Seymour (grandfather)

Alfred George Fell (12 August 1848 – 6 February 1917) was a New Zealand businessman who served as the sixth mayor of Blenheim.

Fell was born in Nelson in 1848. Alfred Fell (1817–1871), an early settler in Nelson, was his father. Charles, Arthur, and Walter Fell were brothers. The Fell family left for England in January 1859 to provide good education for their by then seven children. George Fell was ten when he left New Zealand. He was one of three sons who returned to New Zealand permanently (the others were Charles and Walter).

George Fell returned to New Zealand in 1871 together with his brother Henry, and they joined the Blenheim auctioneer Henry Dodson in a business partnership. Soon after his arrival, he was elected as one of the wardens of the Anglican Church of the Nativity. Henry Fell soon returned to England and became a minister of the Church. George Fell stood for election as mayor of Blenheim in December 1876 and was successful over Frederick John Litchfield.

Fell married Alice Budge, daughter of surveyor William Budge, on 18 January 1873 at the Church of the Nativity in Blenheim. He was in business in Blenheim for many years and then sold his company to Levin and Co. He then ran a malthouse in Picton. In November 1886, Fell was the only candidate for mayor of Picton and declared elected unopposed, which was the start of unopposed returns for him in 1887, 1888, 1889, and 1890.

Fell died in Hobson Street, Wellington, on 6 February 1917, and was buried in Karori Cemetery.
