= Alfred Fell =

Alfred Fell may refer to:

- Alfred Fell (merchant) (1817–1871), early colonist to Nelson in New Zealand
- Alfred Fell (rugby union) (1878–1953), New Zealand-born international rugby union player for Scotland
