= Gerry Fell =

Gerry Fell may refer to:

- Gerry Fell (footballer, born 1898) (1898–1977), English footballer
- Gerry Fell (footballer, born 1951) (1951–2025), English footballer
