= William Fell =

William Fell may refer to:

- William Scott Fell, Australian politician
- William Fell (writer), English writer
- William Richmond Fell, New Zealand naval officer
