= Eric Peter Molyneux =

- Max Lea MBE (left) presented with the 50-plus years membership award by Eric Peter Molyneux (right)
- Born: 26 August 1923; Isle of Wight, England
- Died: 30 May 2023; Borehamwood, Hertfordshire, England
- Military career
- Allegiance: United Kingdom
- Service years: 1943-1947
- Rank: Petty Officer; Sergeant
- Service number: R267870
- Units: Merchant Navy; Royal Army Medical Corps
- Conflicts: D-Day
- Awards: 1939-1945 Star (1947); Atlantic Star with France & Germany Bar (1947); Arctic Star (1947); Africa Star (1947); Pacific Star (1947); Italy Star (1947); Defence Medal (1947); 1939-1945 War Medal (1947); 75th Anniversary of the Victory in the Great Patriotic War 1941-1945 (2021); Chevalier de la Légion d'honneur (2021)
- Other work: Before, During and After (2004)

Eric Peter Molyneux (26 August 1923 - 30 May 2023) was a war veteran who served on board HMS Prince Charles with the Merchant Navy on D-Day. His ship took the US 2nd Rangers to Omaha on the morning of June 6, 1944.

== Early life ==
Eric Peter Molyneux lived in Welwyn with his parents, Harold and Emily Molyneux. They moved to Borehamwood in 1936 as his father was working in Elstree Studios, which was still recovering from a huge fire. His mother was a nanny, and he had two brothers. He and his family occupied 40 Hillside Avenue, which he recalled "a large plum tree at the front, and that the bathroom was in the kitchen area (just inside the back door), and when World War II broke out we had an Anderson shelter built in the back garden."

== Early career ==
In the early 1940s, he had a paper round job, in which he found incendiary bomb cases in Melrose Avenue. He went to school in Furzehill Road and gained a free scholarship to Greggs Business college in Finsbury Park for two years, learning shorthand and typing. Molyneux was a part-time messenger at the so-called Ambulance Centre in the old Village Hall, now 96 Shenley Road. Eventually, he finished at Finsbury Park and took a job at Elstree with a London insurance firm which evacuated from London and was based in a big house in Barnet Lane.

== Second World War ==
Molyneux took part in the allied Normandy landings and served as a Petty officer on HMS Prince Charles (1941), taking soldiers and landing craft which would take them to Omaha Beach.

Having volunteered in the Merchant Navy since 1942, Molyneux, under the threat of heavy gunfire, collected hundreds of US Rangers in readiness for the morning's invasion which would be part of the largest ever and begin the downfall of Nazi Germany.

His two brothers, Keith and Dennis, were also involved in D-Day and survived.

== Referees Association ==
Molyneux spoke about his time in the Referees Association:

"I enthusiastically cycled to watch Arsenal, Tottenham and occasionally to Wembley before becoming interested in refereeing football, obtaining a copy of the Laws, and passing the examination in 1952. As my initial enthusiasm intensified, I joined the Referees Association, and after a few years, I became one of the top Referees in Hertfordshire. However, I did not have the time, ambition, or transport to progress to refereeing at top professional matches. Administratively, I progressed from local, through County, to Divisional and National levels of the RA and FA, becoming involved in training, monitoring, and discussions of Law changes at quite high levels. In 1993 I was appointed Life Member of the Referees Association."

Molyneux has also presented the 50-plus years membership award to Max Lea MBE.

He has received the 50 Years Referee Long Service award from the Herts FA.

== Shenley Parish Council ==
Molyneux was the Clerk of the Shenley Parish Council for 10 years.

== Legion of Honour ==
Molyneux was appointed Chevalier de la Légion d'honneur on April 1, 2021, for his role on D-Day, serving on board HMS Prince Charles with the Merchant Navy. His ship took the US 2nd Rangers to Omaha on the morning of June 6, 1944.

The Légion d'honneur has been added to Mr Molyneux's collection. He was presented with a certificate and medal by his family at his home in Borehamwood in May 2021.

Molyneux said he was "shocked and surprised" by the honour which recognises his military engagement and steadfast involvement in the Liberation of France during the war.

His grandson Carl said: "We are all extremely proud of him and we all feel unbelievably lucky to still have him here and we’ve been able to enjoy this special and momentous occasion with him. He's my idol, and part of an irreplaceable generation. We are all proud of our dad, grandad, great-grandad, and great-great-grandad."
