= Alfred Fell (merchant) =

Merchant in Nelson, New Zealand (1817–1871)

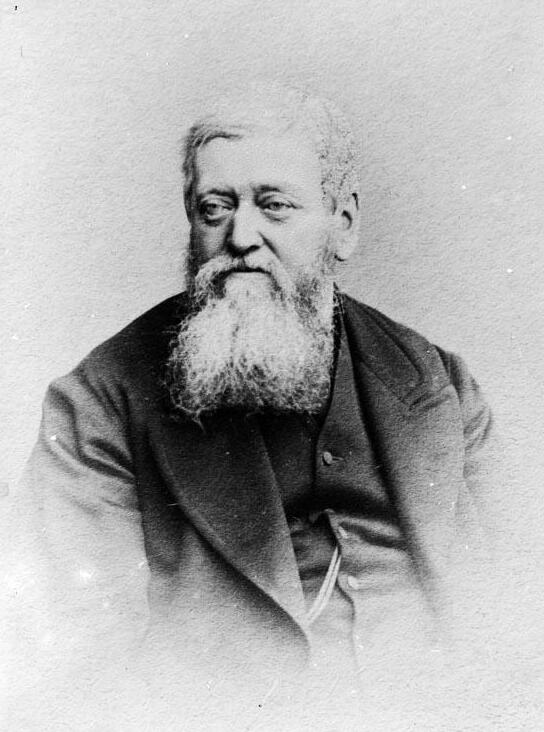
- Fell, year unknown
- Born: 1817; Yorkshire, England
- Died: 2 November 1871 (aged 53–54)
- Occupation: Merchant
- Relatives: Henry Seymour (father-in-law); Charles Fell (son); Arthur Fell (son); George Fell (son); Walter Fell (son); William Richmond Fell (grandson); Alfred Fell (grandson)

Alfred Fell (1817 – 2 November 1871) was an early colonist to Nelson in New Zealand. Born in Yorkshire, England, in 1817, he came to Nelson as a single man in 1842 as one of the first settlers of the town. He immediately established himself as a merchant. He married the daughter of a business partner and they had seven children before they returned to Britain for their children's education. Three of his sons permanently returned to New Zealand. The family home from 1854 still stands and is a registered heritage building.

== Life in New Zealand ==
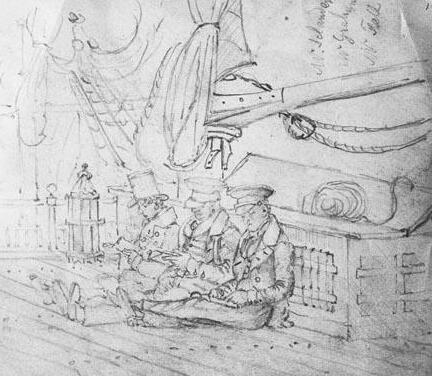
David Sclanders, Peter Graham & Fell on the deck of the Lord Auckland

Fell was born in Yorkshire, England, in 1817. He came to Nelson in February 1842 on the Lord Auckland, one of the first four immigrant ships that the New Zealand Company had sent to that settlement. Fell arrived as a single man but with goods to sell; an uncle by marriage had set him up to become a trader. He began trading as soon as he reached the shore and bought surplus stock from the Lord Auckland. When the first edition of The Nelson Examiner and New Zealand Chronicle was published on 12 March 1842, he advertised himself as "Alfred Fell and Company".

In April 1842, Henry Seymour arrived in Nelson on the Martha Ridgway with wife and daughter. In the following year, Fell, Seymour and John Barnicoat formed a partnership, and the scope of the business was expanded from being a merchant and commission agent to also include land dealings. The three-way partnership did not last long and Barnicoat left in 1844, but Fell and Seymour remained in business until February 1857, shortly before the Seymours returned to Britain to get better healthcare. In April 1858, Fell did not renew his auctioneer's licence, indicating that he had also made plans to return to Britain. He sold his company and the business premises to Nathaniel Edwards and on occasion, he worked as an auctioneer on Edwards' licence. On 3 January 1859, (Note: They travelled from Nelson to Sydney on the RMSS Lord Worsley and left Sydney on 20 January 1859 on the La Hogue. They arrived in England on 27 April.) the Fell family departed for London to provide good education for their by then seven children; their eldest, Charles Fell, was by then 14 years old.

=== Sunnyside ===
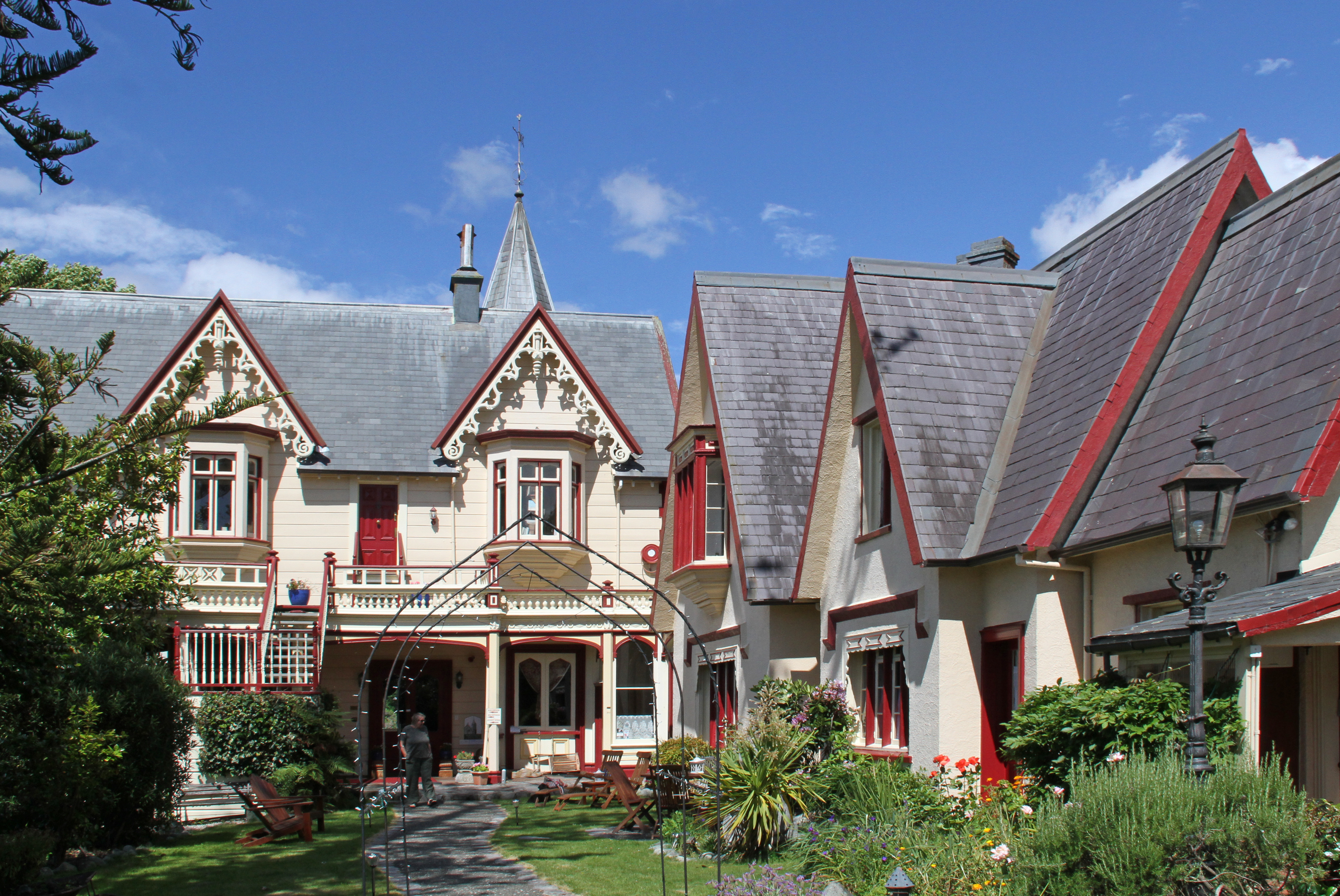
Sunnyside, now Warwick House, in 2016

Fell had a large house built for his family in 1854 that he called Sunnyside. When the family left New Zealand, Sunnyside was leased to David Monro. In 1861, Fell sold the house to Edwards. Some decades later, the name of the building changed to Warwick House. Since 1982, Warwick House has been registered as a Category II heritage building by Heritage New Zealand.

== Family ==
Fell married Seymour's daughter, Fanny, on 26 October 1843. They had seven children in New Zealand (six boys and one girl) and a further girl in 1860 after they had left. After receiving their education, three of his sons returned to New Zealand permanently (Charles, George, and Walter). Henry Seymour Fell returned for some time in a business partnership with George, but he returned to England to become a minister of the Church.

Children
Name	life range	description	references
Charles Fell	(1844–1918)	barrister, local politician, and watercolour artist (NZ)	
Henry Seymour Fell	(1847–1916)	minister of the Church (UK)	
George Fell	(1848–1917)	merchant, local politician (NZ)	
Arthur Fell	(1850–1934)	solicitor, MP (UK)	
Fanny Pope	(1852–1929)	married William Pope, a solicitor in Devon (UK)	
Walter Fell	(1855–1932)	medical doctor, watercolour artist (NZ)	
Edward Nelson Fell	(1857–1928)	mining engineer (Siberia and Canada)	
Henrietta Rundle	(1860–1932)	married Henry Rundle, a solicitor in Devon (UK)	

Alfred Fell died at his residence (either at Greenwich or at Blackheath, London – sources differ) on 2 November 1871.

== Fell's diary ==
Fell wrote a diary during the 1841–42 voyage to New Zealand. This formed the basis of a book published in 1926 A colonist's voyage to New Zealand under sail in the "early forties". His son Arthur wrote the foreword. The book was republished in 1973 as a facsimile.
