= Mary Richmond (teacher) =

New Zealand community leader, teacher and writer

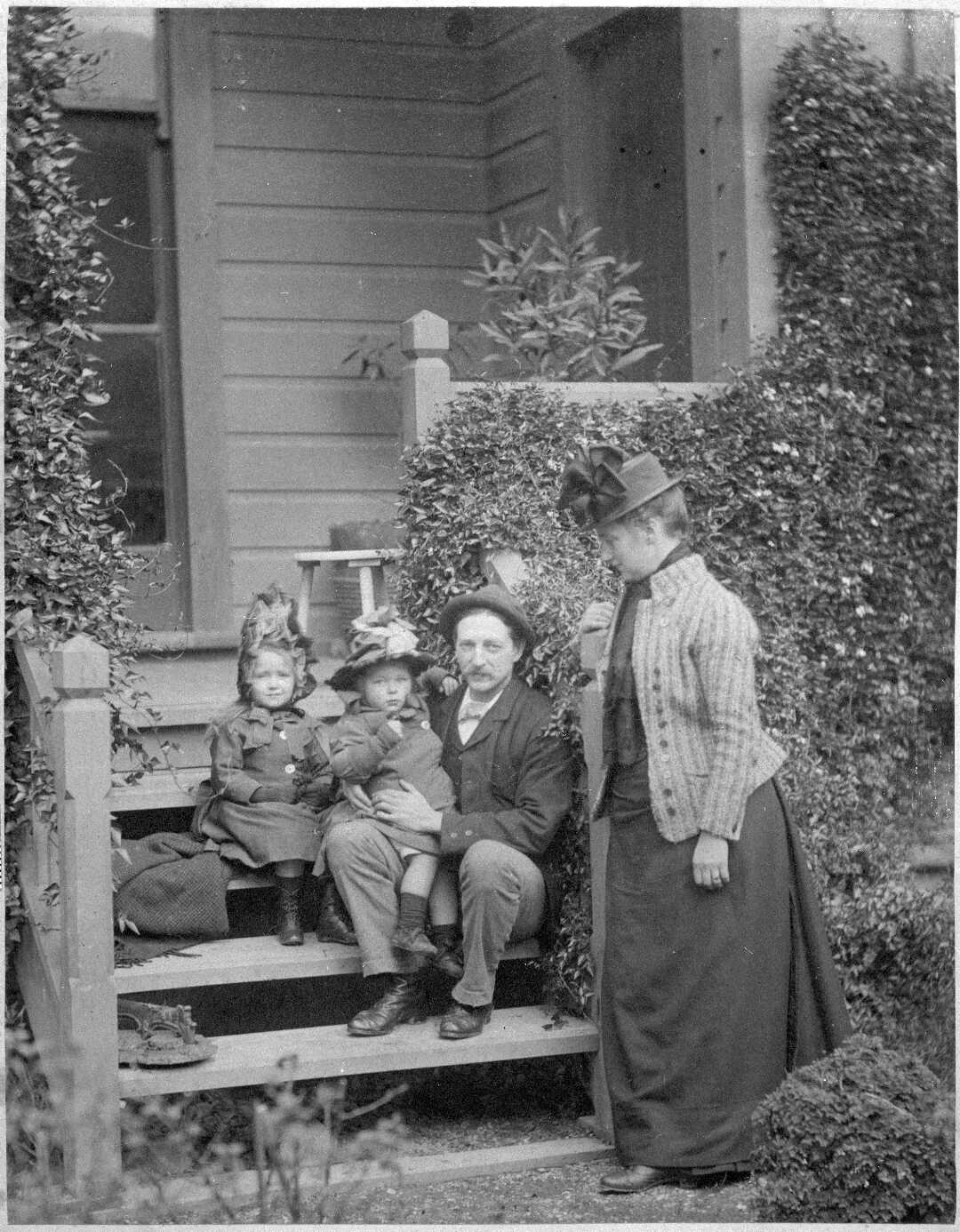
Richmond (right), in Wellington with her brother-in-law, Walter Fell, and his daughters, c. 1890

Mary Elizabeth Richmond CBE (30 August 1853 – 3 July 1949) was a New Zealand community leader, teacher and writer.

She was born in New Plymouth, New Zealand in 1853. Her parents were William Richmond and Emily Elizabeth Atkinson.

From 1884 until 1890, Richmond was a teacher at Wellington Girls' High School. In 1898 she opened a private school in Wellington for children from kindergarten to preparatory level, which she operated until 1911. In 1905 she founded the free kindergarten movement in Wellington; the first of the Richmond Kindergarten Schools was opened in 1906.

She was appointed a Commander of the Order of the British Empire in the 1949 New Year Honours for services in education and welfare work. She died later that year in Wellington, was cremated, and had her ashes buried at Karori Cemetery.
