= James Fell =

James Fell may refer to:

- James Fell (politician) (1821–1890), English-born merchant and political figure in British Columbia
- James Fell (author), Canadian writer
- James Michael Gardner Fell (1923–2016), Canadian-American mathematician
- Jimmy Fell (James Irving Fell, 1936–2011), English footballer
