= The New Zealand Medical Journal =

Peer-reviewed medical journal

- Discipline: Medicine
- Language: English
- Edited by: Frank Frizelle

Publication details
- History: 1887–present
- Publisher: Pasifika Medical Association Group (New Zealand)
- Frequency: 20/year
- Open access: Delayed, after 6 months

Standard abbreviations
- ISO 4: N. Z. Med. J.

Indexing
- CODEN: NZMJAX
- ISSN: 0028-8446 (print); 1175-8716 (web)
- OCLC no.: 01713584

Links
- Journal homepage

The New Zealand Medical Journal (NZMJ) is a peer-reviewed medical journal. It is owned by the Pasifika Medical Association Group (PMAG) and was formerly the official journal of the New Zealand Medical Association.

== Description ==
The NZMJ was established in September 1887 by the New Zealand Branch of the British Medical Association. The present editor-in-chief is Frank Frizelle. The journal is a member of the International Committee of Medical Journal Editors. It has been published online since July 2002, was a key asset of the New Zealand Medical Association (NZMA) up until the 8 July 2022, when the parent body, NZMA services, was put into liquidation. It is now owned by the Pasifika Medical Association Group (PMAG). The journal publishes editorials, original articles, case reports, viewpoint, and letters. There is a four-tier system of subscriber access, with articles older than six months and abstracts being open access.

== Editors ==
- Walter Fell (1855–1932), 1906–1911
- Frank Frizelle, ca 2002–present

== See also ==
- List of medical journals
- Health care in New Zealand
