= Mayor of Picton =

The mayor of Picton officiated over the borough of Picton, New Zealand. The office was created in 1876 when Picton became a borough, and ceased with the 1989 local government reforms, when Picton Borough was amalgamated with Blenheim Borough and Marlborough County to form Marlborough District.

== History ==
Picton was constituted a borough in September 1876. Over much confusion, caused by government gazette notices that appeared to contravene the Municipal Corporations Act, as to whether an election needed to be held, the members of the previous town board agreed that by their interpretation, they would constitute the inaugural council and thus had to elect one of their members as the first mayor. This was done and Thomas Williams was elected as the first mayor of Picton. In December 1876, the first election at large was held and Arthur Seymour beat John Godfrey. Thomas Williams and John Godfrey contested the mayoral election on 28 November 1877, with Williams the successful candidate. In November 1878, William Syms was declared elected mayor unopposed. Syms resigned in May 1879 and a by-election was to be held on 14 June, but Williams was the only candidate nominated by 31 May and once again took the office. The next election was scheduled for 26 November 1879 but on nomination day, 15 November, no candidates came forward. A new election was scheduled for 10 January 1880, but Williams was once again the only nomination and was declared re-elected on 27 December 1879. The subsequent election on 24 November 1880 was won by Alex Thompson, who defeated Captain Lachlan MacNeil. In the November 1881 election, Thompson was the only candidate and declared re-elected unopposed. Samuel Swanwick was the only nomination received on nomination day, set for 15 November 1882, for the next mayoral election. The complication was that the returning officer, Joshua Green, died an hour before nominations closed. There was disagreement whether Swanwick was declared elected by somebody who had not been appointed as deputy returning officer, or whether Swanwick's nomination was announced and the declaration of the election was pending appointment of Green's replacement. William Syms, the former mayor, was appointed as returning officer a week after Green's death but Syms refused to declare Swanwick as elected on various legal grounds. Swanwick took the case to court but lost. A new election was set for 27 January 1883, with three candidates nominated but with William Dart withdrawing before election day. The result was close, with Swanwick receiving 45 votes over 41 for Arthur Fisk.

The next mayoral election was held in November 1883, contested by Arthur Fisk and John Abraham Roberts Greensill, with Greensill successful. The November 1884 election was contested by former mayors Alex Thompson and Arthur Seymour, with Thompson winning. In November 1885, Thompson was returned unopposed. In November 1886, George Fell was the only candidate and declared elected unopposed, which started off unopposed returns for him in 1887, 1888, 1889, and 1890. In November 1891, ratepayers petitioned former mayor Arthur Seymour to accept the mayoralty, which he did.

== List of mayors of Picton ==
The following list shows the mayors of Picton:

	Name	Portrait	Term (Note: Initially, mayoral terms were for a calendar year, with elections held in either November or December for the next year. Terms are recorded by calendar year unless there were irregularities; those are explained in the prose section.)
1	Thomas Williams		1876
2	Arthur Seymour		1877
(1)	Thomas Williams; 2nd time		1878
3	William Syms		Jan–May 1879
(1)	Thomas Williams; 3rd time		May 1879 – Dec 1880
4	Alex Thompson		1881 – Jan 1883
5	Samuel Swanwick		1883
6	John Greensill		1884
(4)	Alex Thompson; 2nd time		1885–1886
7	George Fell		1887–1891
(2)	Arthur Seymour; 2nd time		1892–?
	Allan (AJ) Beaton		1980s
