= Fells (surname) =

Fells is a surname. Notable people with the surname include:

- Daniel Fells (born 1983), American football player
- Darren Fells (born 1986), American football player
- Ian Fells (1932–2025), English professor of energy conservation
- John Manger Fells (1858–1925), British accountant, consultant, and author
- Karl H. Fell (1936–1996), German politician

== See also ==
- Fell (surname)
- Felle
