= Charles Fell =

New Zealand barrister, politician and artist

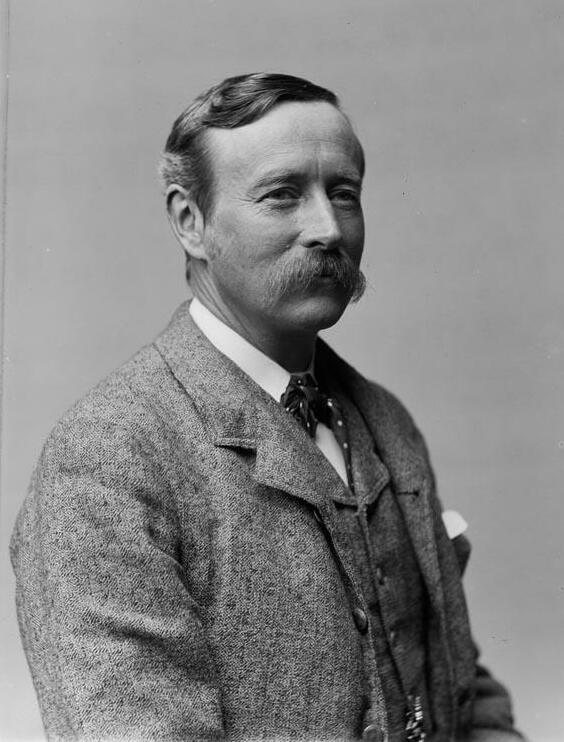
- Fell (year unknown)

5th Mayor of Nelson, New Zealand
- In office 1 May 1874 – 8 January 1875

Personal details
- Born: Charles Yates Fell; 5 August 1844 Nelson, New Zealand
- Died: 9 June 1918 (aged 73) Nelson
- Resting place: Wakapuaka Cemetery
- Relations: Alfred Fell (father); Arthur Fell (brother); Walter Fell (brother); George Fell (brother); Alfred Fell (son); William Richmond Fell (nephew); Arthur Atkinson (father-in-law); Maria Atkinson (mother-in-law)
- Profession: barrister

Charles Yates Fell (5 August 1844 – 9 June 1918) was a New Zealand barrister, politician, watercolour artist, and photographer.

== Early life and family ==
Fell was born in Nelson in 1844. He was the son of Alfred Fell, merchant and early settler, brother of the English politician Arthur Fell and grandson of Henry Seymour, after whom Seymour Square in Blenheim is named.

Fell took lessons with the Rev Meyrick Lully and later with Archdeacon Paul of Nelson. In 1859, both he and his parents returned to England, where he attended King's College School, London. From there he went to St John's College, Oxford, from 1863 to 1867, obtaining a Bachelor of Arts. He married Edith Louisa Bainbridge at Putney, London, in 1869.

== Legal practice ==
Fell was admitted to bar and joined the Home Circuit, entered Lincoln's Inn, and thence Inner Temple. After a short time practising in England he returned to New Zealand in 1870.

In 1880, he entered into partnership with Arthur Atkinson, founding the legal firm Fell and Atkinson. For many years Fell was the Crown Solicitor, Registrar of the Diocese of Nelson, and governor of Nelson College.

After the death of his first wife in 1879, he married Atkinson's daughter, Edith Emily Atkinson, in 1881. She was also the niece of the painter Dolla Richmond.

== Political career ==
Fell became Mayor of Nelson on 23 November 1882 when Edward Everett resigned. Fell remained Mayor until 21 December 1887 when he was succeeded by John Sharp.

== Arts ==
Fell had painted in watercolour while at King's College but did not paint seriously until later life. He was a trustee of the Bishop Suter Art Gallery, Nelson from its inception in 1896 until his death in 1918. In 1918 he accompanied the painter Henry Morland Gore on a sketching tour of Maitai Valley and a member of the New Zealand Academy of Fine Arts.

Two of his works, St Johns Farm, Prades (1916) and Mountain Village are held in the Suter. A third, Country Scene, Nelson, is held in a private collection.

Prior to returning to painting, Fell had become a photographer, specialising in landscapes and portraits. Some of his photographs are held in the National Library of New Zealand.

Fell's talents also extended to music, being noted as a fine musician. He also promoted and supported the Nelson School of Music.

== Sporting activities ==
He was also an athlete, noted as a sprinter, a stroke for his college boat at Oxford, and an horseman. In Nelson he was an yachtsman.

== Death ==
Fell died at Nelson on 9 June 1918 and was buried at Wakapuaka Cemetery.

His son by his first wife, Alfred Fell, played rugby for Scotland while studying at Edinburgh University and served in the Royal Army Medical Corps. His son by his second wife, Charles Richmond Fell, took his place in Fell and Atkinson. He also had six daughters, four by his first wife and two by his second. One daughter, Sylvia Brockett, produced watercolour paintings and designed stamps. Her stamp designs are in the collection at the Museum of New Zealand Te Papa Tongarewa.

Political offices
Preceded by Edward Everett	Mayor of Nelson; 1882–1887	Succeeded by John Sharp
