= Michael Fell =

Michael Fell may refer to:

- Michael Fell (lawyer), American criminal lawyer
- Michael Fell (Royal Navy officer), Royal Navy admiral
- Michael Fell (artist), British painter, printmaker and draftsman
