= Arthur Fell =

English politician

Sir Arthur Fell

Member of Parliament for Great Yarmouth
- In office 1906–1922
- Preceded by: Sir John Colomb
- Succeeded by: Arthur Harbord

Personal details
- Born: 7 August 1850 Nelson, New Zealand
- Died: 29 December 1934 (aged 84) Wimbledon, London, England
- Parent: Alfred Fell (father)
- Relatives: Charles Fell (brother); George Fell (brother); Walter Fell (brother); Alfred Fell (nephew); William Richmond Fell (nephew); Anthony Fell (politician) (grandson); Henry Seymour (grandfather)
- Education: St John's College, Oxford

Sir Arthur Fell (7 August 1850 – 29 December 1934) was an English solicitor and Conservative Party politician. After a notorious legal case in 1906 where a biased judge dismissed an election petition against him, Fell sat in the House of Commons from 1906 to 1922 for Great Yarmouth. He was noted as an opponent of free trade and as a persistent advocate of a Channel Tunnel.

== Early life ==
Fell was born in the city of Nelson, New Zealand, the fourth son of Alfred Fell and brother of Charles Fell, mayor of Nelson. He was educated at St John's College, Oxford, where he graduated in 1871 with a B.A. degree. He qualified as a solicitor in 1874, becoming a partner in the firm of Hare and Fell, agents to the Treasury Solicitor.

== Career ==
Fell moved from law into business, becoming involved in a range of companies including three of which he was chairman: the African City Properties Trust, the Siberian Syndicate and the Spassky Copper Mine. He travelled in Europe and in the British Dominions.

=== 1906 election ===
In July 1904, Fell was selected as the Conservative candidate for the borough of Great Yarmouth, where the sitting Conservative Member of Parliament (MP) Sir John Colomb was retiring and had recommended Fell to the Yarmouth Conservatives. At the general election in 1906, Fell won the seat with a majority of 236 votes (3% of the total).

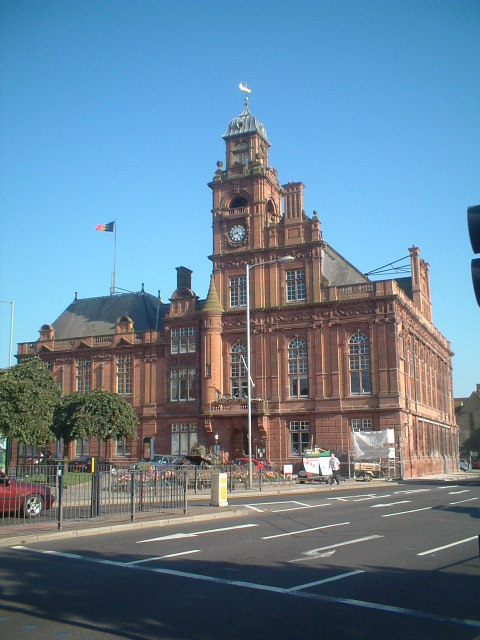
The town hall in Great Yarmouth, where hearings were held in April and May 1906 on the election petition

An election petition was lodged against the result by the defeated Liberal Party candidate Martin White, alleging a range of illegal practices including bribery and treating of voters by Fell and his agents. The hearings began on 26 April at the town hall in Yarmouth, before Justice Grantham and Justice Channell. Both Fell and White employed King's Counsel, assisted on Fell's side by four junior counsel.

The case concluded in May, and the petition was dismissed. The judges found that there had been systematic treating of voters on Fell's behalf, with a series of meetings in public houses, including one in Yarmouth Town Hall on 19 October 1905 which was described as an "orgy"; Fell had sought a drink-free meeting, but unknown to him Colomb had provided two dozen bottles of whisky, and the judges found that the drinking had not been provided on Fell's behalf and was not designed to influence voters. They also dismissed White's complaint that Fell's return of expenses had been incomplete.

However, the judges found that on election day a Mr John George Baker had give some fifteen people a small amount of money, usually a shilling or a half-crown. Baker, who was unknown to Fell's election agent, took a vehicle used by the Conservatives and delivered voters to the poll; he told the election court that he had no politics and had given money to men because they were unemployed. Both judges agreed that Baker had been bribing voters, but differed on the crucial point of whether he had done so on behalf of Fell: in legal terms, whether Baker was acting as Fell's agent. Justice Channell decided that Baker was indeed an agent of Fell, ruling that Baker's action fell clearly within the normal principles of agency; but Justice Grantham disagreed. The law required that both judges had to agree, and so the petition was dismissed. The judges were unable to award costs to Fell, and Channell observed that Fell had "escaped by the skin of his teeth".

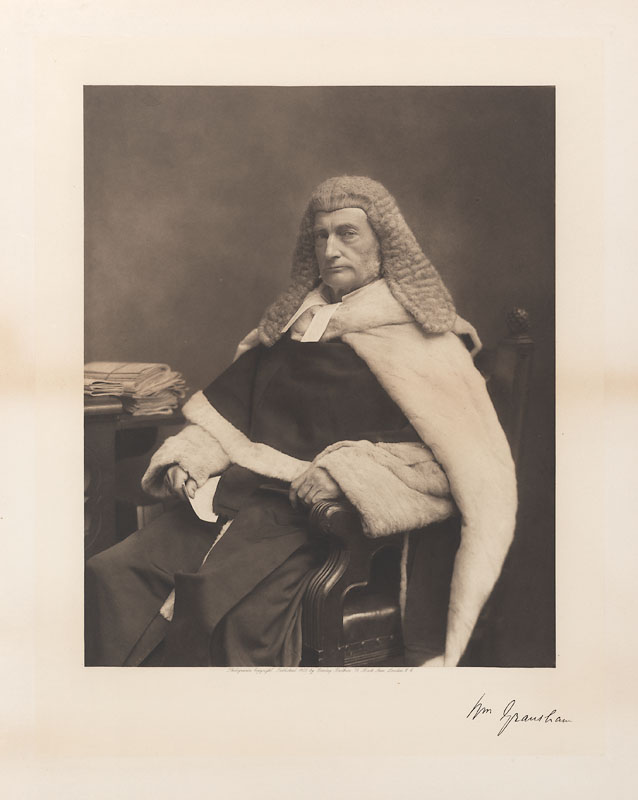
Sir Wiliam Grantham, the judge who dismissed the election petition against Fell

The Times newspaper described the decision as a "curious conclusion". Justice Grantham was himself a former Conservative MP, and this was the third petition hearing at that year in which he had been seen to express political partisanship, having previously heard petitions relating to the 1906 election in Bodmin and Maidstone. After an outburst in court in Liverpool, where he claimed the right to hold and express his political opinions, a motion was tabled in the House of Commons on the Great Yarmouth petition, which sought to begin the a formal process of examining "complaints that have been made of the partisan and political character of the conduct during the trial of that petition of Mr. Justice Grantham." The motion, which had been signed by 347 MPs, was moved by South Donegal MP J. G. Swift MacNeill, who attacked Grantham to repeated cheers in the House. Baker, he pointed out, was a boatman whose wife was being sued for non-payment of her milk bill; and Grantham had described Colomb as "my fear friend". In a lengthy debate, the Attorney-General Sir John Walton described Grantham's conduct as "most unfortunate", but warned the House that proceeding to ask the Crown to remove a judge was an extreme step, and one he advised against. MacNeill withdrew the motion.

=== Subsequent elections ===
At the January 1910 general election, Fell faced a strong challenge from the Liberal Major J. E. Platt, a manufacturer from Manchester. However, Fell held the seat with a slightly increased majority of 461 votes (5.4%), and was returned again in December 1910 with a majority of 373 votes over Platt. He was knighted in February 1918, and returned for a fourth and final time at the 1918 general election, as a Coalition Conservative and stood down from the Commons at the 1922 general election, having announced his retirement in early 1920.

=== In Parliament ===
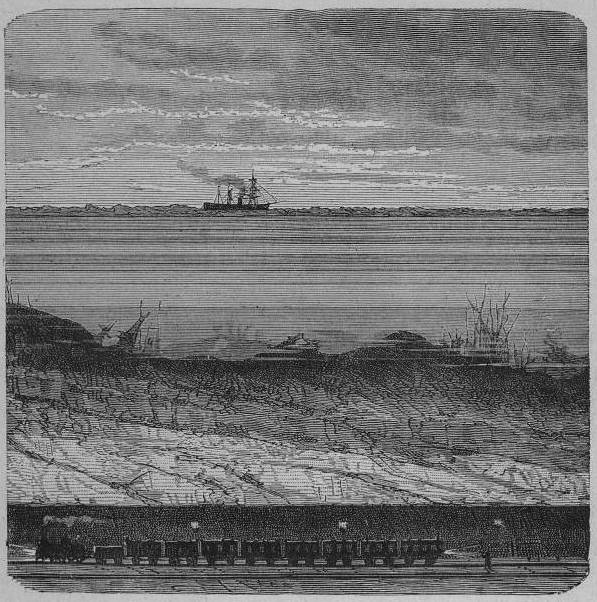
Channel Tunnel as depicted in 1885

In Parliament, Fell was a noted protectionist, and an outspoken critics of free trade who published a series of pamphlets both on trade and on food supplies in wartime, including The Fallacy of Free Trade, The Failure of Free Trade and John Bull's Balance Sheet.

Fell was also a long-standing advocate of building a rail tunnel under the English Channel between England and France. He presented a paper The Channel Tunnel to the Royal Society of Arts (RSA) on 17 December 1913 and by February 1914 he was the chairman of the House of Commons Channel Tunnel Committee, an all-party parliamentary group (with 100 members in 1914) which he chaired until 1922. The tunnel's advocates included the Duke of Argyll, Lord Glantawe, Joynson-Hicks, Will Crooks, Hamar Greenwood, Sir William Bull and Arthur Conan Doyle. At a public meeting in London in February 1914 they made the case that the tunnel would increase commerce in peacetime and improve communications in wartime.

During World War I, Fell and the committee continued to press the case for a tunnel, leading a delegation of MPs to the Prime Minister H. H. Asquith in October 1916. Asquith responded that the idea had been considered back in 1883 by a committee of both Houses of Parliament, who had recommended against a tunnel, and a long series of bills brought to Parliament since then had failed. When Henry Campbell-Bannerman became prime minister in 1907, he had commissioned a review by the Committee of Imperial Defence, which opposed the scheme. In 1913 Asquith had asked the Committee to decide whether to review its decision, and although it declined to do so, there had been a dissenting minority. Asquith said that the experience of the war had shown that a tunnel could have had an important role in supplying the British Expeditionary Force, and that a full review was now needed.

By 1917, Asquith had been replaced as prime minister by David Lloyd George, and Fell told the National Liberal Club that he had "a very shrewd idea" what Lloyd George's attitude would be to the scheme, and that if a review reported in favour of a tunnel the coalition government would support it. In June of that year, 110 MPs supported a request for a debate on a tunnel.

On 13 June 1918, Fell presented another paper to the RSA. In London and the Channel Tunnel he argued that a railway connection to other major countries was essential if London was to retain its place as a world city, and that leaving London cut off from continental Europe by "a stormy sea" would condemn it to isolation.

In November 1919, Fell led another delegation to 10 Downing Street, which included the Irish Parliamentary Party MP Captain William Redmond and the Labour Party leader William Adamson. when Lloyd George told them that the government no longer had a political objection to a tunnel, but that its final position awaited a report on the military issues from the General Staff who in 1916 had been too busy with the war to consider the project. He noted that the major change over the years was that France was now an ally rather than an enemy, but that it was still necessary to consider the risk of an enemy seizing the tunnel and mounting a surprise attack.

Little progress appears to have been made, and in July 1920 the Channel Tunnel Committee passed a resolution urging that government approval for a tunnel "no longer be postponed". In July 1921, the Annual General Meeting of the Channel Tunnel Company Limited was told by its chairman Baron Emile d'Erlanger that despite all the hard work of Fell and his committee, the company had "not yet received any intimation that the government was prepared to entertain the question seriously".

In March 1922, Fell gave notice on behalf of the Committee of his intention to move a motion in the Commons calling on the government to give permission for the resumption of work on the tunnel, experimental tunneling having begun two years earlier. In August he presented a request signed by 217 MPs for a debate to be held during the autumn session of Parliament. However, Parliament was dissolved in October for the general election and Fell retired from the Commons. He was made an honorary member of the Committee, and Sir William Bull was elected to succeed him as chairman.

The following summer, the Channel Tunnel Company's AGM was told that in December 1922 the new prime minister Bonar Law had responded to a question from Viscount Curzon by saying "no decision has yet been taken, and I am not at present prepared to consider this question".

In retirement, Fell continued to promote the cause of the tunnel, writing to The Times in 1924 to lament that while the French Channel Tunnel Company had been given the legal power to construct a tunnel, and the engineers said it could be built, the British Company had no power to start work in Kent.

== Personal life ==
Fell lived in Wimbledon for many years, at Lauriston House on Wimbledon Common. Lauriston House, a former residence of William Wilberforce, was filled with paintings by Fell, as well as containing a mural by the Swiss neo-classical artist Angelica Kauffmann. Fell supported the preservation of the Common, and opposed efforts to build on the course of the Royal Wimbledon Golf Course.

In 1877 he married Annie, the daughter of Baron von Rosenberg of Dresden, and in 1900 he married Matilda Wortabet, daughter of John Wortabet MD from Edinburgh.

Fell died suddenly on 29 December 1934, aged 84, in the Wimbledon branch of Barclays Bank. He was survived by his son and three daughters, and his grandson Sir Anthony Fell (1914–1998) was the MP for Great Yarmouth from 1951 to 1966.

Fell's estate was valued on probate at £113,371 (net), of which he left £50 to M.G. Bertin, the Secretary of the French Channel Tunnel Association "as a token of my esteem and appreciation of his untiring efforts to promote good fellowship between France and England, and to carry into effect the Channel Tunnel, the construction of which Marechal Foch declared might have prevented the War and in any case shortened its duration by half".

Parliament of the United Kingdom
Preceded by Sir John Colomb	Member of Parliament for Great Yarmouth; 1906–1922	Succeeded by Arthur Harbord
