= Walter Fell =

New Zealand physician and painter

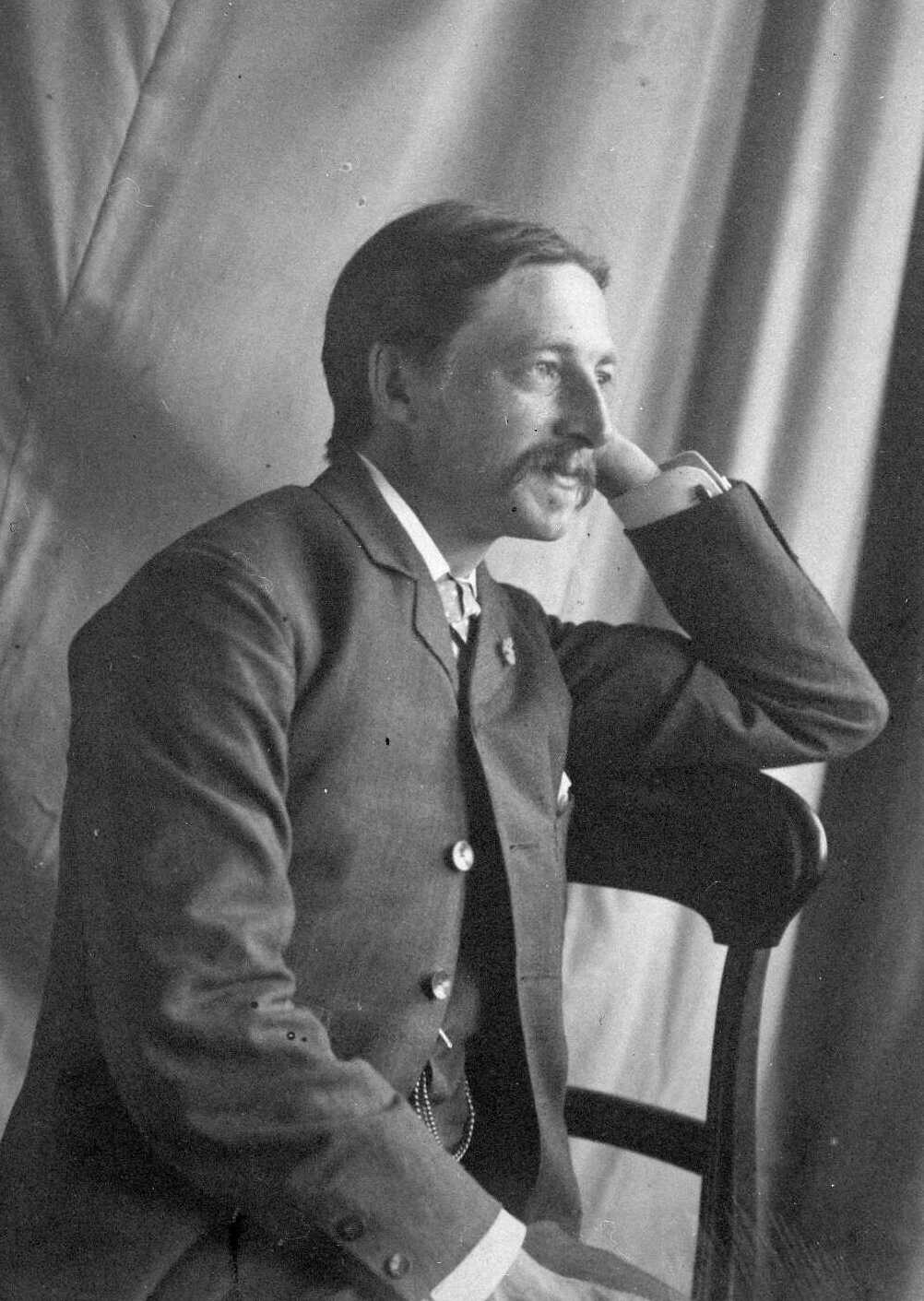
- Fell in 1895
- Born: 28 March 1855; Sunnyside, Nelson, New Zealand
- Died: 22 November 1932 (aged 77); Māhina Bay, Lower Hutt, New Zealand
- Years active: 1884–1907; 1914–1918
- Spouse: Margaret Richmond (m. 1886)
- Children: 5
- Relatives: Alfred Fell (father); Arthur Fell (brother); Charles Fell (brother); George Fell (brother); Alfred Fell (nephew); William Richmond Fell (son); William Richmond (father-in-law); Henry Seymour (grandfather)
- Medical career
- Institutions: Wellington Hospital
- Sub-specialties: Surgery
- Military career
- Allegiance: United Kingdom
- Branch: Royal Army Medical Corps
- Service years: 1914–1918
- Rank: Major
- War: World War I

Walter Fell (28 March 1855 – 22 November 1932) was a New Zealand physician and surgeon.

== Early life and education ==
Fell was born on 28 March 1855 at his parents' house Sunnyside (Note: The house still stands and is today known as Warwick House.) in Nelson, New Zealand. His parents were Fanny (née Seymour) and Alfred Fell. He was their sixth child and fifth son. His brothers included Charles, who was the eldest, George, also an older sibling, and Arthur, the next-oldest after George. Two more siblings were born in New Zealand before the family decided to return to England for better educational opportunities; they left in January 1859. Once in England, (Note: The Walter Fell obituary in The New Zealand Herald is the only obituary for any of the family that mentions that the family initially spent some years in the south of France.) one more sister was born. He received his education at Rugby School and at University College, Oxford. He studied medicine at St Thomas' Hospital in London, where he gained a Doctor of Medicine. His 1895 doctoral thesis was The Evolution of Disease.

== Professional career ==
Walter Fells' brothers Charles and George had returned to permanently live in New Zealand in 1870 and 1871, respectively. In 1884, he was the third and last of the children to return to New Zealand permanently. He joined William Collins in his Wellington practice in February 1884. He was honorary surgeon at Wellington Hospital from 1887 to 1890, then honorary physician from 1890 to 1892, and again honorary surgeon from 1893 to 1907. Fell retired in 1907. From 1906 to 1911, he was the editor of The New Zealand Medical Journal. During World War One, he went to England as an army doctor. After a variety of assignments, he worked at the Bethnal Green Soldiers' Hospital and gained the rank of major.

== Family and interests ==
During his professional career, Fell lived in Wellington at 107 Willis Street. In 1910, he moved to the eastern side of Wellington Harbour to an area belonging to Lower Hutt, where he was one of the first residents. An avid sailer, Fell had a yacht Mahina. The house he had built was also called Mahina. This name was adopted for both the locality and its bay, and Māhina Bay became the official name of the suburb. Fell served as president for both the Port Nicholson Yacht Club and the Star Boating Club. Fell took up painting in his middle years. He was one of the original members of the Wellington Art Club in 1892. From 1900 to 1909, he was president of the NZ Academy of Fine Arts. Some of his work is in The Suter Art Gallery and his work was exhibited at the New Zealand Centennial Exhibition in 1940.

On 26 April 1886 at St Paul's Church in Wellington, Fell married Margaret (Margie) Richmond. She was the daughter of judge William Richmond, and the niece of Maria and Arthur Atkinson. William Collins was groomsman. The wedding reception was held at judge Richmond's house and afterwards, the couple left for a honeymoon at Rotorua to visit the various lakes. Their son William Richmond Fell became a naval officer.

Fell died at his home on 22 November 1932. He was survived by his wife, two sons and three daughters. He was buried at Karori Cemetery in Wellington.

Gallery
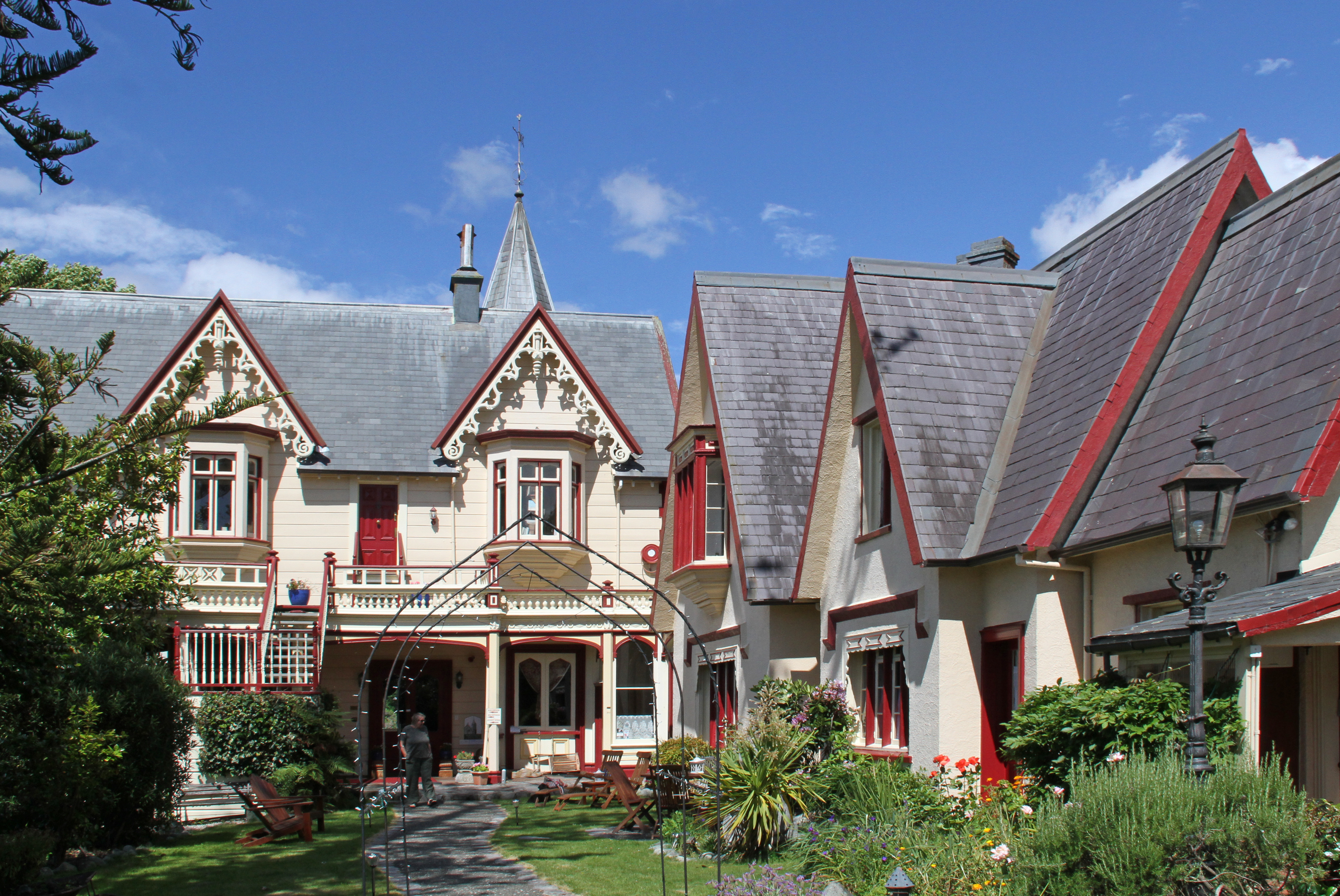
Fell's birthplace Sunnyside, now known as Warwick House

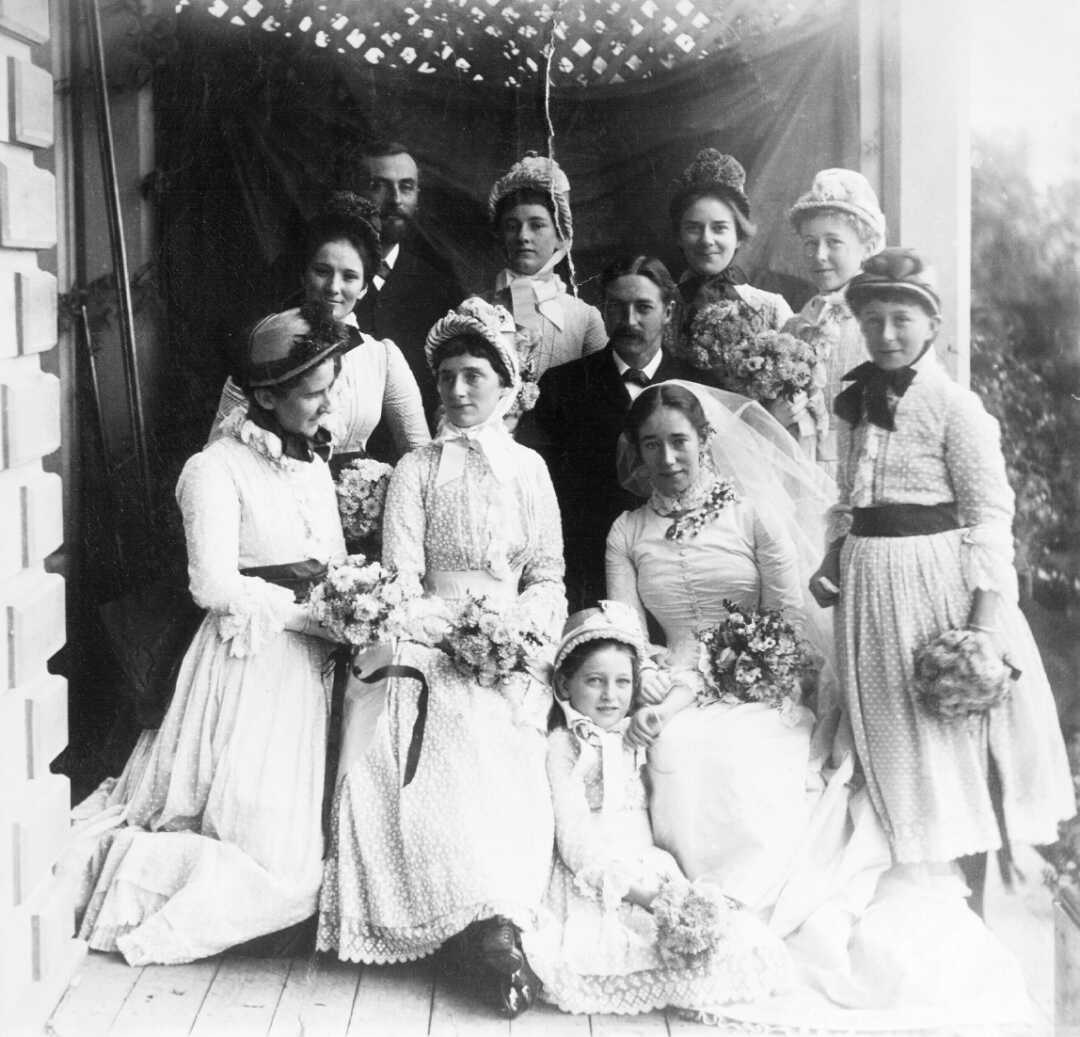
Fell / Richmond wedding party

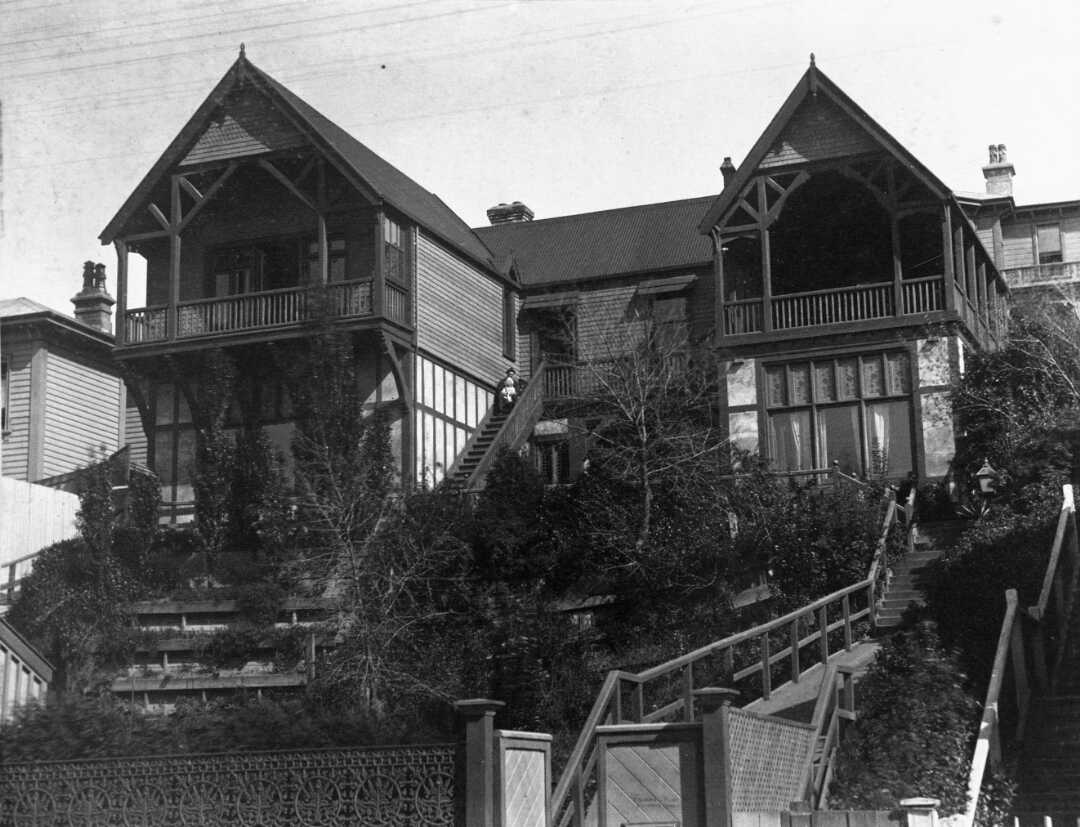
The Fell family home in Wellington's Willis Street

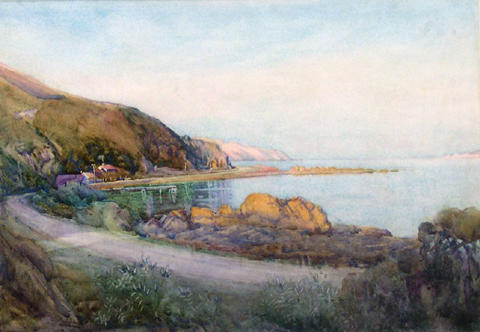
Painting of Mahina Bay by Dolla Richmond, a niece of Margaret Richmond
