= Michael Fell (lawyer) =

American lawyer

Michael L. Fell
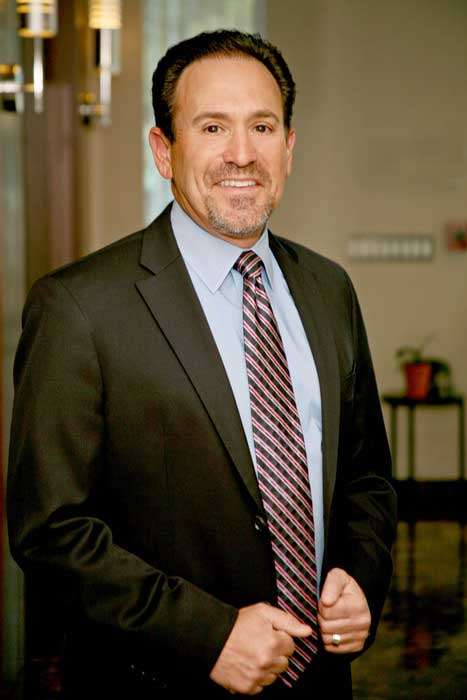
- Education: University of California at Santa Barbara BA; Loyola Law School (Los Angeles) JD
- Occupation: Attorney at Law
- Known for: Chelsea King murder trial Nick Adenhart murder trial
- Spouse: Jennifer Robertson Fell
- Children: 4
- Awards: Diligent Prosecutor Award – MADD 2006, Ambassador of Peace – Victims Rights Coalition of Orange County 2003, Certificate of Appreciation – Community Service Programs/Victim Assistance Programs 2002, Outstanding Service Award – MADD 1996, Lawyer of the Year – Mock Trial Competition, Constitutional Rights Foundation of Orange County 1995, Outstanding Service Award – MADD 1995
- Website: www.justice4crimevictims.com www.mfellattorneyatlaw.com www.ocdefensacriminal.com

Michael L. Fell is a California criminal lawyer and former prosecutor, who concentrates in representing victims under Marsy's Law, the state constitutional amendment that guarantees legal rights for victims of crime. He is the founder of Justice 4 Crime Victims (J4CV), representing crime victims and their families during the criminal prosecution of their offenders. J4CV offers legal representation to crime victims before, during and after the perpetrators have been tried for their crimes. Fell has represented victims' families in such notable cases as the molestation-murder of San Diego teenager Chelsea King, and the deaths at the hands of a drunken driver of major league baseball pitcher Nick Adenhart, aspiring sports agent Henry Pearson and Cal State Fullerton cheer leading beauty Courtney Stewart, as well as the serious injury of former Cal State Fullerton baseball great Jon Wilhite.

== Early years and education ==
Fell attended the University of California at Santa Barbara where he earned his Bachelor of Arts Degree in political science and graduated with "very high honors" in 1986. Fell was in the Political Science honors program and wrote his honor's thesis on the political and strategic implementation of the MX Missile. After graduation, Fell worked briefly as a Deputy Probation Officer for Santa Barbara County prior to attending Loyola Law School in Los Angeles, California. Fell was a staff writer and later an editor of the Law Review.

== Legal career ==
From 1989 until 2008, Fell was a California Senior Deputy District Attorney with the Orange County District Attorney's Office, where he prosecuted many high-profile cases, including People v. Dennis Rodman, People v. Raul Marin and People v. Alistair Irvine.

Fell, while serving as the Hate-Crime Prosecutor for the DA's Office, was instrumental in developing TURN (Teaching Understanding Respect and Non-Violence), a tolerance training program for juveniles through the Orange County Superior Court. In 2003, Fell was acknowledged with the prestigious Ambassador of Peace Award from the Violence Prevention Coalition of Orange County, for his efforts in developing TURN and combating hate crime.

Fell has been actively involved in representing victims who have been injured by DUI drivers. As a prosecutor, he was recognized by Mothers Against Drunk Driving (MADD) Orange County, as a two-time recipient of MADD's Diligent Prosecutor Award.

Fell left the DA's Office in January 2008, and became the California Senior Trial Counsel for the construction defect firm of Feinberg Grant Mayfield Kaneda & Litt LLP.

After starting his own firm, Fell became interested in Marsy's Law, which California voters passed on November 4, 2008, as Proposition 9, adding section 28 to Article I of the California Constitution. This constitutional amendment, spearheaded by Henry T. Nicholas in remembrance of his murdered sister Marsy Nicholas, has become known as "Marsy's Law: California's Victims' Bill of Rights." Under Marsy's Law, crime victims are now granted Constitutional Rights enabling their voices to be heard before, during, and after a criminal trial. Such constitutional guarantees as the right to meet with a prosecutor before any criminal charges are filed against the accused, the right to be heard regarding sufficient bail, the right to be heard regarding the request of an accused to continue his/her case, the right to be heard prior to sentencing, the right to obtain an attorney of their choice, as well as many others, are included under Marsy's Law. In 2010, Fell founded Justice 4 Crime Victims, offering legal representation to crime victims under Marsy's Law

== Selected cases and clients ==
=== Family of Chelsea King ===
On February 25, 2010, 17-year-old Chelsea King was jogging through Rancho Bernardo Community Park in San Diego, California. John Albert Gardner, a paroled sex offender, raped, strangled and killed Ms. King and then buried her in a shallow grave. Gardner pleaded guilty to killing Chelsea and also admitted to raping and killing 14-year-old Amber Dubois on February 13, 2009. Finally, Gardner admitted to assaulting Candice Moncayo on December 27, 2009, with the intent to rape her. For these crimes, Gardner was sentenced to life in prison without the possibility of parole.

The King family retained Fell along with a San Diego law firm to fight for their rights under Marsy's Law and to ensure that sensitive crime scene and autopsy photos of their daughter were not released to the media. Through Fell's work with the King family, no such photos were released to the public.

=== Family of Nick Adenhart ===
On April 9, 2009, Los Angeles Angels of Anaheim pitcher Adenhart, Pearson, Stewart and Wilhite were driving in a car together when they were hit by a drunk driver. Adenhart, Pearson and Stewart were killed and Wilhite suffered an internal decapitation but survived. Fell was retained under Marsy's Law by the surviving family members of victims to represent them before and during the murder trial of Andrew Gallo.

Citing Marsy's Law, the families argued against continuance motions, a venue motion, and against live media being allowed into the courtroom. It was the first time ever in Orange County that Marsy's Law had been utilized in a trial. The trial judge read written briefs filed and listened to oral testimony and arguments presented by, and on behalf of, the families. Through Fell's work with the families, the trial began after a defense continuance motion was denied, a change of venue motion was denied, and cameras were barred from the courtroom.

=== Lynette Duncan ===
On December 28, 2010, Fell represented Lynette Duncan under Marsy's Law at the parole hearing for Brett Thomas, who shot and killed her father and sister 33 years ago in Anaheim, CA. Thomas, who with Mark Titch went on a nine-day crime spree in January 1977, killing four people, including Aubrey and Denise Duncan in an attempted robbery outside the Duncan family's home. Lynette's mother was critically injured in the attack but eventually recovered, but the family was emotionally destroyed by the crime.

Thomas and Titch pleaded guilty to multiple murder counts. They were sentenced to life in prison but eligible for parole after seven years. They repeatedly have been denied parole and this is the first time a member of the Duncan family has appeared to argue against the murderers' release. Despite her fears, Lynette Duncan traveled across the country and missed Christmas with her two daughters in order to confront Thomas, but he moved at the last minute to postpone the hearing, which will be rescheduled. However, Lynette Duncan delivered a powerful statement arguing that Thomas' parole bid be rejected for the maximum 15 years required by Marsy's Law.

According to the Orange County Register, in her statement, "Duncan said she has lived in fear for 33 years, since the tragedy at her parents' home when she was 17, especially when she hears – and remembers – the sound of police and ambulance sirens. "It would be years before I could again hear a siren and not revert to a panic attack, for fear that it was happening to yet another family," she said. "I can still hear the sound of the gunshot," Duncan told the parole board. "I had never heard gunshot before. I tried to pass if off as a car backfiring, but it kept happening over and over. Every sound pierced my soul. "Life was very difficult after that," she added. "My family, which previously spent many weekends camping or visiting friends, ceased to exist...We couldn't help each other heal because we were all just surviving and needed help ourselves." Duncan said if Thomas were to be paroled, "I will be victimized all over again, as will my family. The fear is very real." According to the Orange County Register, Fell told the Parole Commissioners that Thomas was afraid to face Duncan. "After 33 years, my client mustered the courage to face (Thomas)," Fell said. "Inmate Thomas, however, can't find the courage to face her."

== Awards and recognition ==
- Diligent Prosecutor Award – Mothers Against Drunk Driving 2006
- Ambassador of Peace – Victims Rights Coalition of Orange County 2003
- Certificate of Appreciation – Community Service Programs/Victim Assistance Programs 2002
- Outstanding Service Award – Mothers Against Drunk Driving 1996
- Lawyer of the Year – Mock Trial Competition – Constitutional Rights Foundation of Orange County 1995
- Outstanding Service Award – Mothers Against Drunk Driving 1995
