= Leonard Fell =

English Quaker

Leonard Fell (died 1700), was an English Quaker.

== Biography ==
Fell was the son of Thomas Fell of Beckliff, Lancashire (now Baycliff, Cumbria), and in his early life gained a position of trust in the household of his relative, Thomas Fell, at Swarthmoor. He became a Quaker in 1652; between 1654 and 1657 he was repeatedly sent to prison for interrupting services, and in 1661 was imprisoned for a religious offence at Leicester. Most of his time was spent preaching excursions, although he retained his situation at Swarthmoor until at least 1665, when he was imprisoned in Lancaster Castle for being at an illegal conventicle. He also owned some property in Addingham, Cumberland; in 1666 he was sent to prison at the suit of the vicar of Addingham for refusing to pay tithes, but was discharged within two weeks following the vicar's death.

Fell was sentenced to a long imprisonment in 1668 for attending a meeting at Swarthmoor and then refusing the oaths. In 1672 he was again imprisoned for refusing to pay tithes to Theo Aimes, vicar of Baycliff, but was released for a second time due to the death of his suitor. He was fined for preaching at a meeting on the shore of Lake Windermere, and again two years later by the justices of Westmorland for the same offence. In the intervals between his imprisonments he was engaged in ministerial work, chiefly in the northern counties and in Wales, and his preaching was said to have been "of an earnest and loving character rather than argumentative or doctrinal". In September 1684 he was sent to prison for more than a month for absenting himself from the parish church, and immediately after his release was again arrested and incarcerated for about eight weeks for the same offence.

In 1699 Fell went on a preaching tour in northern England with Benjamin Holme and Joseph Kirkbride. He died while on a preaching excursion at Darlington in 1700, having been a minister nearly 50 years.

== Personal life ==
Fell is known to have been married, but had no family, and little education. According to the Dictionary of National Biography, "his character was amiable rather than strong, but on occasion he could be fearless. It is said that being once plundered by a highwayman, he said that though he would not give his life for his horse or money, he would for the robber's soul, whereupon the man returned both horse and money".

== Works ==
- The Persecution of them People they call Quakers in several places in Lancashire (with W. Adamson), 1656.
- An Epistle for the Strengthening and Confirming of Friends in their Most Holy Faith, 1670.
- A Warning to England in general and the cities of London and Bristol in particular, 1693.
- My Testimony to my Dear, True, and Well-beloved Friend and Father in Christ, George Fox, written 1691, printed 1706.
