= Henry Fell =

Henry Fell (fl. 1655–1674), was an English Quaker missionary and writer who travelled to Barbados and America.

== Life ==
In 1655 he was an itinerant preacher at a meeting in Gravesend.

Fell was a member of one of the numerous Lancashire families bearing his surname and was possibly related to the Quaker Margaret Fell but not in a close way. The first mention of him is in 1656 as suffering much from the magistrates in Essex, and in the same year he went as a missionary to the West Indies, where he remained about a year. After his return to England he was engaged as a travelling preacher, and is referred to by his contemporaries as having been eloquent and successful. In 1659 he was seriously ill-treated by some soldiers near Westminster Hall, and in 1660 Richard Hubberthorne, the quaker, represented to Charles II that at Thetford, Norfolk, Fell had been hauled out of a meeting, and, after being whipped, turned out of the town, and passed as a vagabond from parish to parish to Lancashire. In a letter to Margaret Fell (Swarthmore MSS.) Fell states that he was imprisoned for some time at Thetford. He was in London during the rising of the Fifth-monarchy men in this year, and was knocked down by the soldiers as a rioter, and Fox (Journal, p. 314, ed. 1765) says he would have been killed but for the interposition of the Duke of York. In 1661 he was ‘moved,’ in company with John Stubbs, to promulgate his views in ‘foreign parts, especially to Prester John's country and China.’ As no shipmasters would carry them, the quakers got a warrant from the king, which the East India Company found means to avoid. They then went to Holland, and, being unable to obtain shipping there, proceeded to Alexandria. The English consul banished them from the place as nuisances, and they were compelled to return to England. After spending some time in religious journeys, he again visited the West Indies, and a letter in the Shackleton collection states that in 1672 he was living in Barbados, that he was married, in debt, and much depressed. His wife was Lydia Erbery who was the sister of Dorcas Erbery. Dorcas had been a controversial Quaker and she too may have journeyed to Barbados. He was alive in 1674 and dead by 1680. He is thought to have died in America or Barbados.

== Bibliography ==
- ‘An Alarum of Truth sounded forth to the Nations,’ &c., 1660.
- ‘To Charles, King of England, Scotland, and Ireland, from one who is in prison, a Sufferer for the Testimony of his Conscience,’ &c., 1660.
- ‘A Plain Record or Declaration showing the Original Root and Race of Persecution,’ 1661.
