= James Fell (author) =

Canadian writer and historian

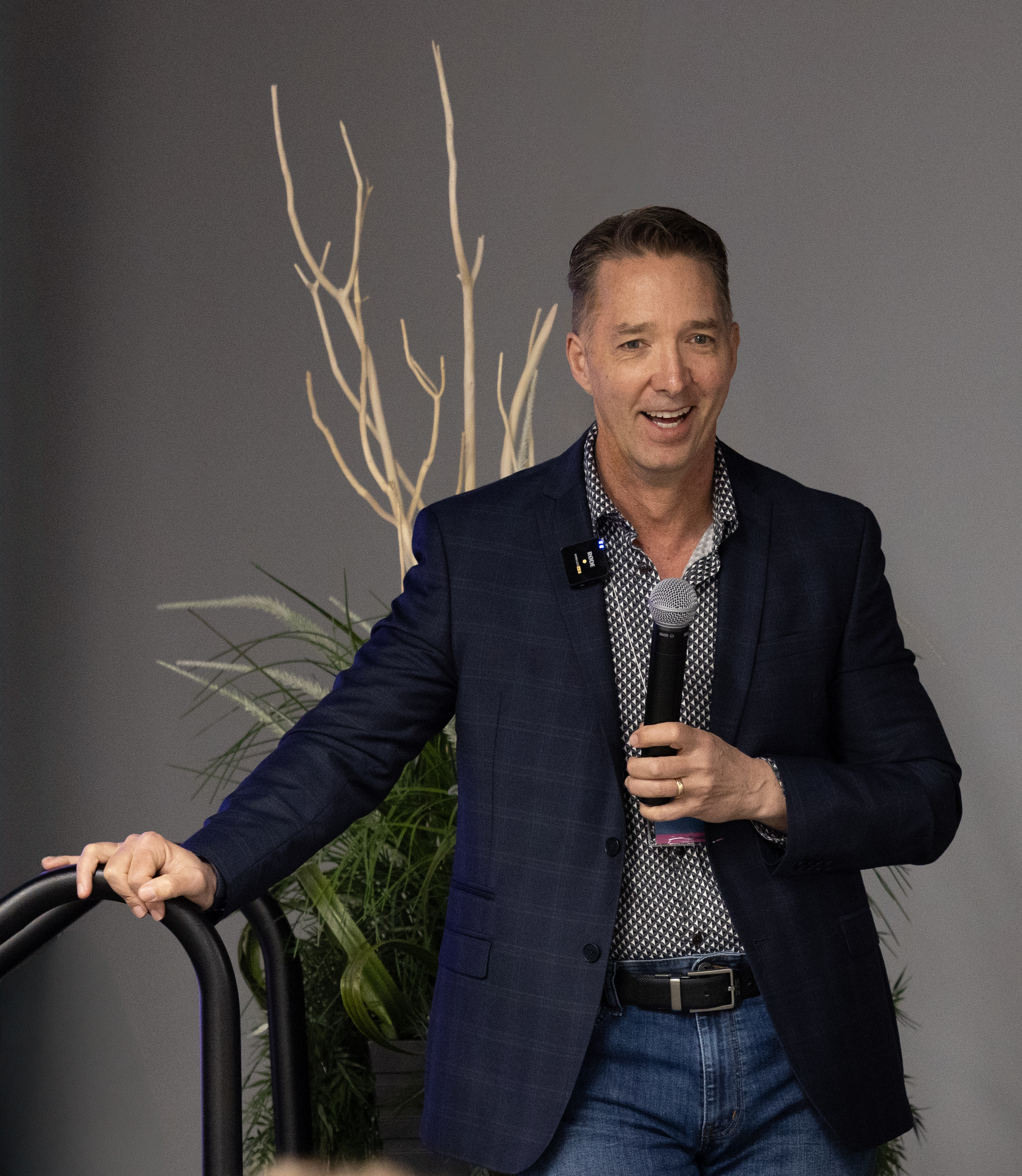
- Education: University of Calgary
- Occupation: Author
- Writing career
- Genres: fitness; diet; sweary history
- Website: jamesfell.com

Signature
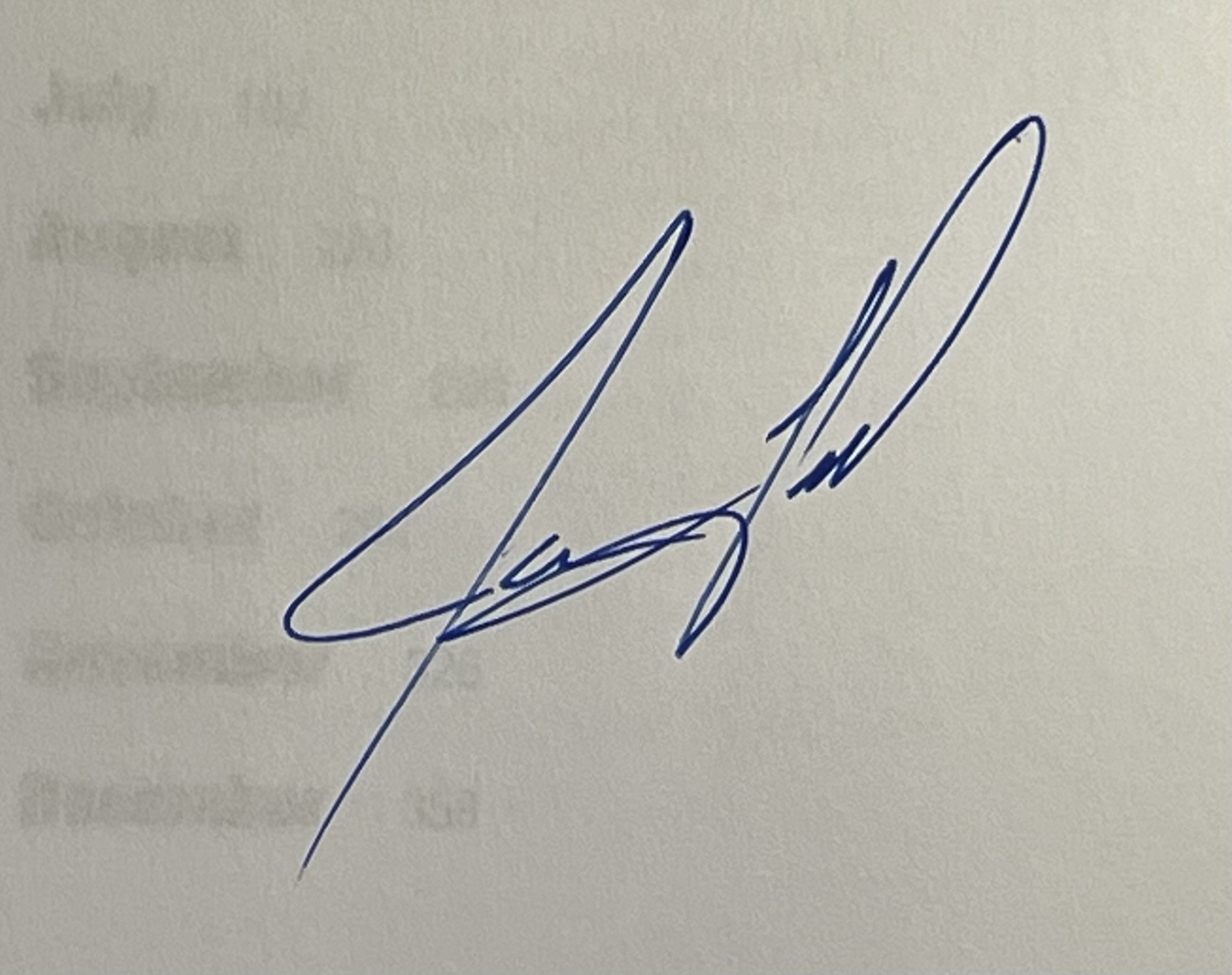

James Fell (born 1968) is a Canadian writer. He initially wrote about health and fitness in an effort to debunk fitness myths. Since 2020, his books have focused on historical events.

== Early life and education ==
James Fell resided in Victoria, British Columbia, Canada and then Burns Lake, British Columbia, until he was seven years old. His parents then divorced, and Fell and his mother moved to Prince George, then subsequently to Calgary, Alberta.

Fell disliked school; enrolled at the University of Calgary where he struggled academically. Things improved after he encountered a quote by Joan Baez, "Action is the antidote to despair," and after he met his future wife, Heidi, a medical school student. He focused on his education to impress her, and he discovered a love of history from an inspiring professor. He received a master's degree in history, then an MBA.

== Writing ==
=== Diet, fitness and motivation ===
Fell became a certified strength and conditioning specialist and wrote a column called "In-Your-Face Fitness" for the Chicago Tribune; he also wrote about fitness for the Los Angeles Times, AskMen, Men's Health, Time, The Guardian, NPR, and Chatelaine magazine.

Fell has written several books, including his first book, Lose It Right: A Brutally Honest 3-Stage Program to Help You Get Fit and Lose Weight Without Losing Your Mind, for which he received a rejection letter from a publisher because it was too "sensible", advocating for a slow approach that includes a practical diet and exercise. He had a website called Body for Wife, a play on the best-selling book Body for Life, which some of his friends followed diligently without the same results that Fell was getting. When asked about his secret, he said he was on the "Body for Wife program".

In his writing, Fell sought to debunk fitness myths, warned against fad diets, advised not comparing your body to others, recommended participating in both aerobic and weightlifting activities, and suggested finding a physical activity that a person will not hate, eventually becoming proficient at it. Fell declared that if a diet book is a best seller it probably is not a good idea to follow its guidelines. He also wrote about how marijuana has been shown to interfere with attempts to lose weight because it stimulates appetite.

In 2019, Fell's book The Holy Sh!t Moment was published by St. Martin's Press, which discussed the psychology and steps needed for long term transformations.

=== Jillian Michaels ===
In one of Fell's first articles for the Los Angeles Times, he wrote about Jillian Michaels, the fitness trainer from the television series The Biggest Loser. He referred to Michaels as "an actress playing the role of fitness trainer". He declared that her workout routines and technique were not safe, quoting others who agreed with this assessment. He also criticized her Kettlebell DVDs which promised losing five pounds a week, calling this unrealistic. Michaels was unhappy with his criticism and threatened to sue Fell for defamation. The prospect of legal action prompted the Los Angeles Times to modify certain details within the article.

=== Chicken Soup for the Soul ===
Fell wrote two stories for the book series called Chicken Soup for the Soul. One was about running, and the other was about the Cheslatta River Race in British Columbia, where Fell and his father competed when Fell was fifteen years old. The river race story was included in a Father's Day publication in 2010.

=== Writing about history ===
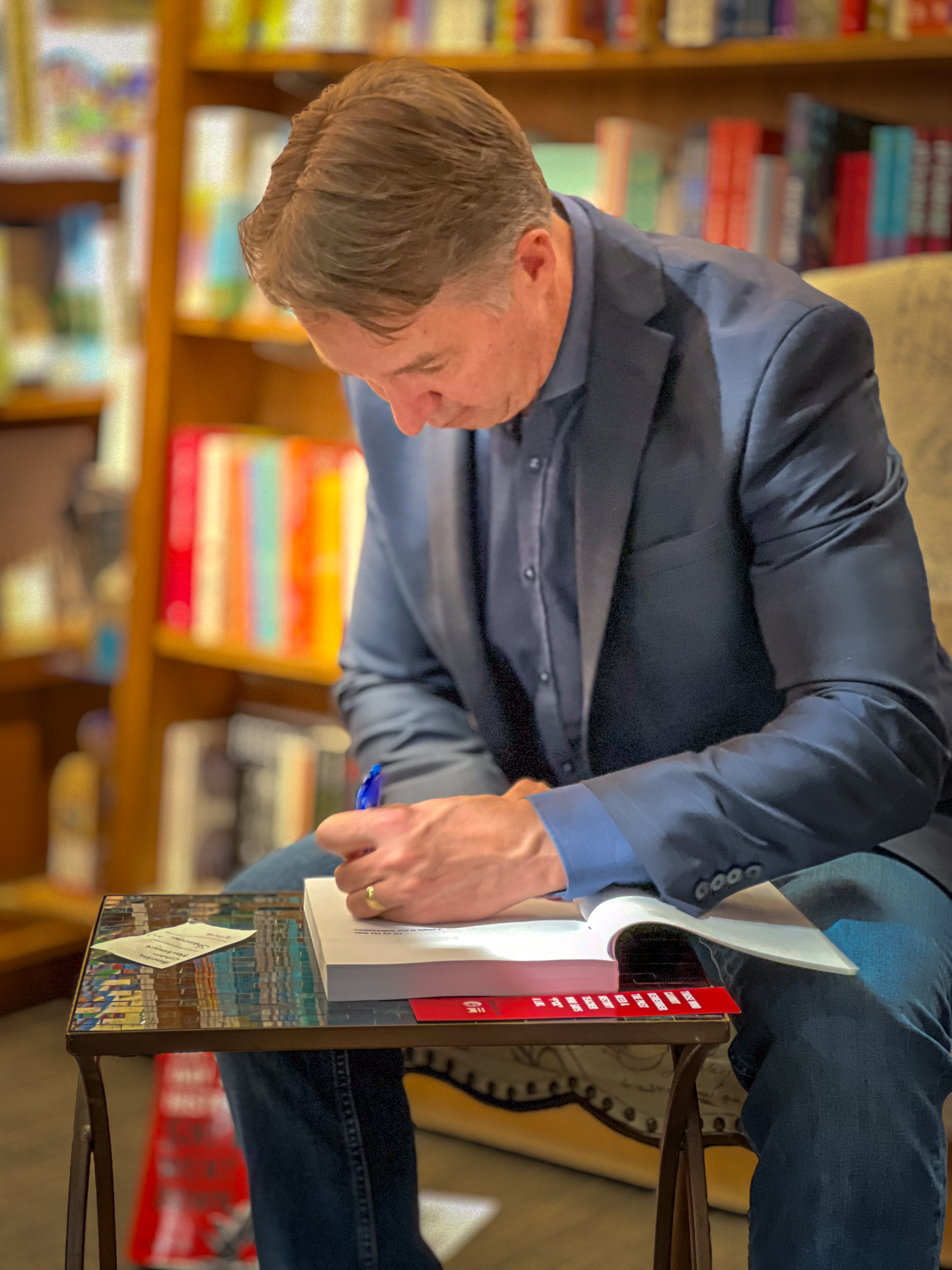
James Fell signing his book On This Day In History SH!T Went Down at the Owl's Nest books store in Calgary, Canada

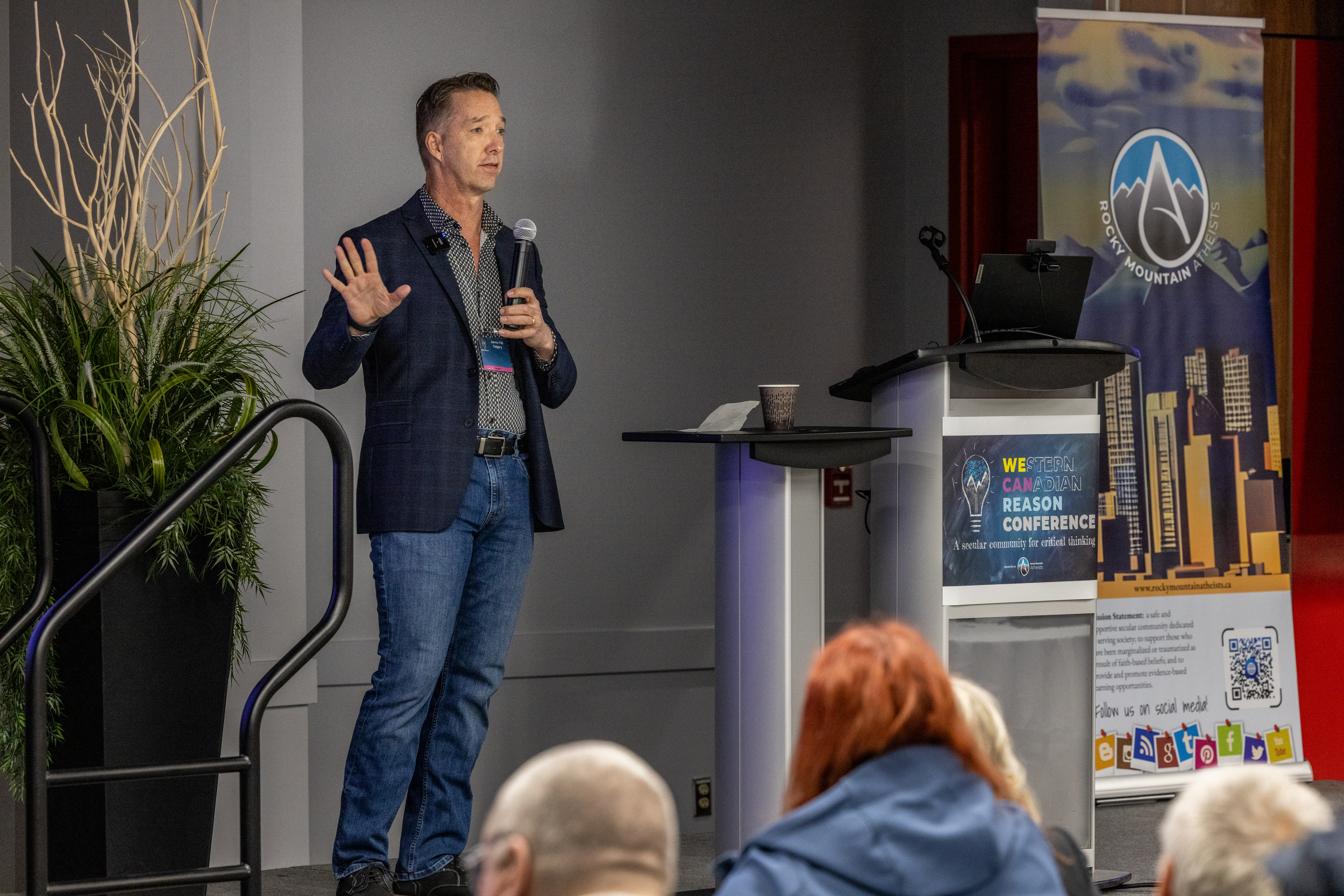
James Fell speaking at the Western Canadian Reason Conference Calgary, Canada

Fell decided to change occupations and become a public speaker, but the COVID-19 pandemic interrupted this idea. In 2020, he began writing about history, posting daily on his social media. The daily posts explained unusual and often unknown events that occurred on that calendar date in history.

In 2021, Fell independently published a collection of his daily posts called On This Day in History Sh!t Went Down. By 2022, he had sold 30,000 copies, and his social media following had grown from 80,000 to 250,000 people. He then published a second edition. The books included revisions based on feedback from readers. Fell added to his web page a "Historyscope", inspired by daily horoscopes, so readers could find out what happened in history on their birthday.

In 2023, Bantam Books released On This Day in History Sh!t Went Down, and it was ranked fourth on the Canadian non-Fiction Best sellers list for the week of October 9 to 15, 2023. It also appeared first in Alberta for non-fiction sales.

Fell, talking about a range of topics including fitness, motivation, and history, has appeared on podcasts, Canadian television, and radio shows. These include The Social, Citytv, Shaw TV Calgary, CBC Radio One, CKUA Radio Network, and The Thinking Atheist Podcast with Seth Andrews. He spoke about fitness and weight loss on JohnLivesay.com, about running on RunningforReal.com, and about brave women standing up for their rights on WhatsSheSaidTalk.com

On November 26, 2022, Fell spoke at a TEDxTirguMures event in Romania. He spoke at the Western Canadian Reason Conference in Calgary, Alberta on May 4, 2024.

== Personal life ==
As a result of the 2013 Boston Marathon Bombing, Fell set a goal to run in the 2014 Boston Marathon. Fell qualified for the race at the 2013 Victoria Marathon, despite collapsing and crawling to the finish line. The Boston Marathon was his third marathon.

In 2019, Fell opposed a planned "Straight Pride Parade". He and actor Chris Evans shared a post written by Fell, seeking to explain why a "straight pride" parade made no sense. The posts were covered by media outlets including Elle, People, India Today, and E! News.

Fell was diagnosed with ADHD when he was 53 years old, during the COVID-19 pandemic, and now takes medication which he says was life-changing. He credits his ADHD with creativity and his ability to write in an uninhibited style. He writes in the morning, taking Ritalin in the afternoon when he needs to complete household chores, marketing and administrative work.

Fell is an atheist, receiving no religious education from his parents.

== Bibliography ==
- Fell, James (2023), On This Day in History Sh!t Went Down, Bantam Books, p. 416, ISBN 978-0593724088
- Fell, James (2022), On This Day in History Sh!t Went Down: Number 2, BFW Publishing, p. 408, ISBN 978-1989351833
- Fell, James (2019), The Holy Sh!t Moment: How Lasting Change Can Happen in an Instant, St. Martin's Press, p. 288, ISBN 978-1250186300
- Fell, James (2014), Lose it Right: A Brutally Honest 3-Stage Program to Help You Get Fit and Lose Weight Without Losing Your Mind, Random House Canada, p. 320, ISBN 978-0345812469
