= Derek Fell =

Derek Fell (September 28, 1939 - 18 July 2019) was a writer and photographer with art, travel and garden books totaling more than 2.5 million in print, plus a photo library numbering more than 150,000 images portraying plants, gardens and travel destinations. Fell has created his own test garden for both design concepts as well as photographic shoots at Cedaridge Farm in Bucks County, Pennsylvania.

== Author ==
Fell has authored more than sixty books and garden calendars, including 550 Home Landscaping Ideas (Simon & Schuster), The Encyclopedia of Garden Design (Firefly Books), The Complete Garden Planning Manual (Friedman), Garden Accents (Henry Holt) and Home Landscaping (Simon & Schuster). Some titles are listed below:

- Flower and Garden Photography, Silver Pixel Press, 2000.
- Water Gardening for Beginners, Friedman/Fairfax (New York, NY), 2000.
- Herb Gardening for Beginners, Friedman/Fairfax (New York, NY), 2000.
- Van Gogh's Gardens, Simon & Schuster (New York, NY), 2001.
- Campbell Island: Land of the Blue Sunflower, David Bateman (Auckland, New Zealand), 2003.
- (And photographer) Great Gardens of New Zealand, David Bateman (Auckland, New Zealand), 2003.
- Cézanne's Garden, Simon & Schuster (New York, NY), 2004.
- Van Gogh's Women: His Love Affair and His Journey into Madness, Carroll & Graf (New York, NY), 2004.
- The Encyclopedia of Garden Design and Structure, Bateman (Auckland, New Zealand), 2006
- The Gardens of Frank Lloyd Wright, introduction by James van Sweden; Frances Linden 2009 ISBN 978-0-7112-2967-9
- "Monet's Palate Cookbook", with Aileen Bordman, Gibbs-Smith, 2015

== Photographer ==
Fell has accumulated a library of over 150,000 images. These images have been published in numerous newspapers, magazines, advertising campaigns. They also have been used for many books, calendars, postcards, invitations and many other personal projects. Fell has traveled the world to obtain these images and enjoys sharing these with designers, publishers, garden lovers, etc.

== Horticulturist/garden designer ==
Fell enjoys designing gardens. He has designed gardens throughout the world over his nearly 50 years of experience, including numerous gardens at the White House during the Gerald Ford Administration. Fell was responsible for the 'Win' garden, following his 'Win Speech', advising the nation about ten ways to fight inflation. Fell also designed “The Bamboo Garden” at historic Magnolia Plantation, South Carolina.

Fell enjoys designing all types of gardens for both individuals and businesses, including water gardens, perennial gardens, tropical gardens, herb/vegetable gardens, Japanese gardens and many more. Along with photographer and author Aileen Bordman, the kitchen garden of Claude Monet was brought back to life.

Fell died 18 July 2019.
