= Charles Fell (divine) =

English Roman Catholic priest

Charles Fell, D.D. (1687–1763) was an English Roman Catholic priest.

== Biography ==
Fell was born in England, but he was of French extraction, and was originally named Umfreville. After studying philosophy and divinity at the communauté of Monsieur Duvieux he was sent to St. Gregory's Seminary at Paris in 1706. In the following year he went to Douay to learn English and to complete his divinity course. In 1709 he returned to Paris, and in 1713 was ordained priest. He was created a Doctor of Divinity in 1716.

After coming on the English mission he resided principally in London, where he devoted his leisure time to the compilation of ‘The Lives of Saints; collected from Authentick Records of Church History. With a full Account of the other Festivals throughout the year. To which is prefixed a Treatise on the Moveable Feasts and Fasts of the Church’ Robert Witham of Douay wrote observations on this work, and denounced it at Rome. Witham's principal complaint was that Fell had taken his Lives chiefly from Bachlet, and had recorded few miracles.

Witham's manuscript was formerly in the library of the English College at Rome. The publication of the ‘Lives’ involved Fell in such pecuniary difficulties that when he was required to give a statement of his accounts of the clergy property, for which he was the administrator in London, he was found to owe 1,272 pounds. Of this sum he was unable to pay more than ten pence on the pound in 1731. In the following year his irregular election as a member of the chapter gave rise to much contention, and to some publications. The case was decided against him on appeal. He died in Gray's Inn on 22 October 1763.
