= Felle =

Felle may refer to:

== Places ==
- Felle, Norway, a village in Nissedal municipality in Telemark

== People with the surname ==
- Amelia Felle (born 1961), Italian opera singer and voice teacher
- Ernst Felle (1876–1959), German rower

== See also ==
- Feller (surname)
- Fells (surname)
- Pelle (surname)
