= Gerry Fell (footballer, born 1898) =

English footballer

Personal information
- Full name: Gerald Fell
- Date of birth: 3 December 1898
- Place of birth: Scunthorpe, England
- Date of death: 1977 (aged 78–79)
- Position: Half-back

Senior career*
Years	Team	Apps	(Gls)
1914–1915	Elsecar		
1919–1922	Barnsley	61	(3)
1922–1928	Bradford Park Avenue	184	(6)
1928–1929	Chesterfield	42	(4)
1929–1933	Gainsborough Trinity		
1933–1934	Mexborough Athletic		
1934	Newark Town		
Total		287	(13)
- * Club domestic league appearances and goals

Gerald Fell (3 December 1898 – 1977) was an English footballer who played in the Football League for Barnsley, Bradford Park Avenue and Chesterfield. He was the grandfather of his namesake, footballer Gerry Fell.
