= HMS Prince Charles (1941) =

History

Belgium
- Name: Prince Charles
- Owner: Regie voor Maritiem Transport
- Builder: Cockerill (Hoboken, Belgium)
- Launched: 12 April 1930

United Kingdom
- Name: HMS Prince Charles
- Commissioned: 21 September 1941
- Decommissioned: 1945

Belgium
- Name: Prince Charles
- Owner: Regie voor Maritiem Transport
- In service: 1945
- Out of service: 21 December 1960
- Fate: Sold for scrap and broken up at Willebroek

General characteristics
- Tonnage: 3,088 GRT
- Length: 360 ft (110 m)
- Propulsion: 6 boilers, 2 shafts, geared steam turbines, producing 15,400 shp (11.5 MW)
- Speed: 24 kn (44 km/h)
- Complement: 207 crew; 250 embarked forces
- Armament: 2 × 12 pdr AA guns (single), 2 × 2 pdr AA (single), 6 × 20 mm guns (single)
- Notes: Carried 8 × LCA's/LCS(M)s or LCP(L)s

HMS Prince Charles was a ship taken up from trade in the Second World War. Built as the Belgian cross-channel ferry Prince Charles, she was requisitioned by the Royal Navy and used as a Landing ship, infantry, before being returned in early 1945.

== History ==
=== Civilian service ===
Prince Charles was originally ordered by the Belgian government in 1929 as part of a series of four fast ferries for cross-channel use, and was completed in 1930. The ship was named after Prince Charles of Belgium.

After the war, Prince Charles resumed her cross-channel service without incident before being scrapped in December 1960.

=== Operation Archery ===
Prior to commencing Operation Archery, the operation's task force assembled at Scapa Flow and travelled from there to Sullom Voe, arriving at 13:30 on 25 December 1941. During the passage both Prince Charles and another transport, Prince Leopold reported several defects, resulting in the forward compartments of Charles being flooded to a depth of 14 feet (4.3 m). At 16:15, the decision was taken to delay the operation by 24 hours because of the seaworthiness of Prince Charles, and the expected poor weather en route. Prince Charles was assisted in having water pumped out by Chiddingfold, and as a result all repairs were completed by 14:00 hours on 26 December. The force set sail at 16:00 hours on the same day.

=== Operation Jubilee ===
Prince Charles was used in the ill-fated landings at Dieppe in 1942, along with her sister ships, Prince Leopold, Prince Albert and Princess Astrid. All four ships originally served on the same pre-war Ostend–Dover route.

=== Omaha Beach landings ===
Prince Charles also took part in the D-Day landings, transporting 300 US Rangers to Omaha Beach, and carrying wounded soldiers back to the UK. During the landings, she lost three of her attached Landing Craft Assault.
