= William Fell (writer) =

English writer

(Walter) William Fell (1761/2 – 27 March 1848, Shap) was an English writer.

== Life ==
William Fell was probably born near Brampton, Cumberland. He was a schoolmaster successively at Manchester, Wilmslow, and Lancaster, and was an industrious writer for the press. After his retirement he lived at Clifton, near Lowther, Westmorland. He died in March 1848 at Shap, aged 86, predeceased by his wife Dorothy and son Edward. He left his substantial property to the children of his elder brother, John Fell of Swindale Head, thereby disinheriting his only surviving son, Henry, who lived in Denmark.

== Works ==
- Hints on the Instruction of Youth (anonymous), Manchester, 1798
- Hints on the Causes of the High Prices of Provisions, Penrith, 1800
- A System of Political Economy, Salford, 1808
- Remarks on Mr. Lancaster's System of Education, in which his erroneous statements and the defects in his mode of tuition are detected and explained, Warrington, 1811
- A Sketch of the Principal Events in English History, Warrington, 1811; 2nd edition 1813
