= Gerry Fell (footballer, born 1951) =

English footballer (1951–2025)

Personal information
- Full name: Gerald Charles Fell
- Date of birth: 1 March 1951
- Place of birth: Newark-on-Trent, Nottinghamshire, England
- Date of death: 13 May 2025 (aged 74)
- Height: 6 ft 0 in (1.83 m)
- Position: Winger

Senior career*
Years	Team	Apps	(Gls)
- Stamford
- Long Eaton United
1974–1977	Brighton & Hove Albion	91	(20)
1977–1980	Southend United	45	(10)
1980–1982	Torquay United	50	(12)
1982	→ York City (loan)	5	(0)
1982	Happy Valley		
1982–1986	Whitehawk		
Total		191	(42)
- * Club domestic league appearances and goals

Gerald Charles Fell (1 March 1951 – 13 May 2025) was an English professional footballer who played as a winger in the Football League for Brighton & Hove Albion, Southend United, Torquay United and York City.

Fell began his career at Stamford and was then signed by Long Eaton United after impressing against them in the FA Cup. A NatWest bank clerk, he turned professional with Brighton & Hove Albion aged 23 in October 1974 after being tipped off by Albion number two and former Long Eaton boss Brian Daykin, who was Peter Taylor's assistant. He made 53 appearances and scored thirteen goals in his first two seasons at the Albion. In 1976–77, despite strong competition from Tony Towner, Fell was able to make 26 League and cup appearances. His goals included the third against eventual champions Mansfield Town and a crucial winner versus Port Vale, both in April. Fell was subsequently sold to Southend United in November 1977 as part of the deal that brought Paul Clark to the Goldstone Ground.

Following his career in the football league, Fell had a spell abroad in Hong Kong for Happy Valley, before returning to Brighton to play non-League football in the Sussex County League for Whitehawk. He finished the 1983–84 season as Whitehawk's leading goalscorer with 35 in all competitions and also played representative football for Sussex. In 1984, Fell captained Whitehawk to the Sussex County League Championship. He was player of the season at Whitehawk in 1984–85, before retiring in 1986.

Fell died of cancer on 13 May 2025, at the age of 74. His grandfather, also named Gerry Fell, was a footballer as well.
