= Henry Seymour (New Zealand politician) =

New Zealand politician (1796–1883)

Henry Seymour (6 December 1796 – 31 March 1883) was one of the earliest settlers in Nelson, New Zealand, where he was a trader and land speculator. He was a member of the Legislative Council of New Munster Province from 1849, and was appointed to the new Legislative Council in 1853 until his resignation in 1860. He returned to England and died in Worcestershire.

== Life ==
Seymour first came to notice as Steward of the Public Rooms in Teignmouth (new public rooms had been opened there in 1826, replacing an earlier establishment of 1796), where he organised events such as regattas and Christmas balls. Evidently building on this experience, in 1830 he became the first lessee of the Pittville Pump Room in Cheltenham, Gloucestershire, England, living in a house in nearby Prestbury. He was secretary of the Cheltenham Horticultural Society, and when he emigrated to New Zealand, he took acorns with him. At Pittville, he was acquainted with the architect and future New Zealand public figure Robert Stokes (politician), who tried to get Seymour a passage at the same time he himself emigrated in 1839, describing him as 'a most active person and of great energy'. By 1837, Seymour was combining running the Pump Room in the summer with operating the Pulteney Hotel in Bath in the winter. In the event, Seymour came to Nelson in April 1842 on board the Martha Ridgway, accompanied by his wife Elizabeth and daughter Fanny. Alfred Fell had arrived two months before him, and together they set themselves up as merchants and became very rich. Seymour and Fell were active as land agents, and both also speculated with land themselves. They owned the land on which Blenheim was founded, and Seymour Square is officially named for Henry Seymour, although there are some who claim that it is named for the unrelated Arthur Seymour.

The Seymours left for England in late 1850, and returned with the Maori on Christmas Day in 1851. Fell and Seymour were business partners until 1857, when Seymour decided to return to England permanently as his wife was suffering from poor health. Seymour sold his business interests to Nathaniel Edwards. The Seymours left for England in April 1857 and locals of all classes signed a testimonial, expressing their appreciation of his contributions to society. His house, Prestbury Cottage, was put up for sale in February 1858 and was still on the market the following January.

From England, Seymour helped with the appointment of a new head master for Nelson College in 1858, and George Heppel from St John's College in Cambridge was sent to New Zealand.

== Political career ==
Seymour was appointed to the Legislative Council of New Munster Province on 18 January 1849. During his New Munster membership, the Legislative Council had its only session during May and June 1849. The New Zealand Constitution Act 1852 outlined a new form of governance for New Zealand, and the Governor, George Grey, nominated the first members of the new Legislative Council in May 1853, and chose the remaining ones on 31 December of that year. Seymour was part of the latter nomination and remained a member until 28 May 1860, when he resigned. In the house, Seymour was unpopular as a representative of large absentee landlords, but in the new Legislative Council, his experience in constitutional and procedural matters was valued.

== Family and death ==
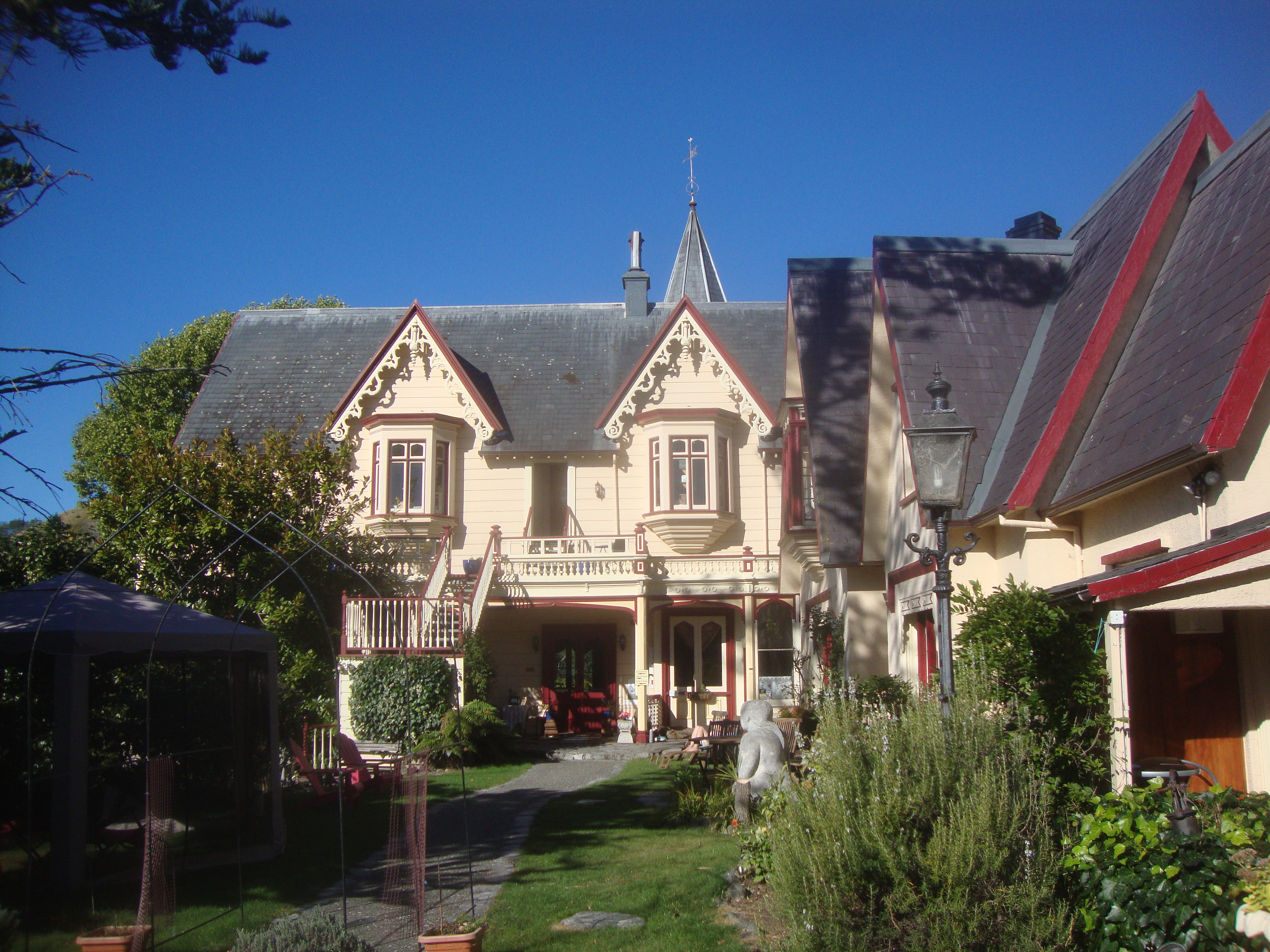
Warwick House, built by his business partner and son-in-law Alfred Fell

Fanny Seymour and Alfred Fell married on 26 October 1843. Their first son, Charles Fell (1844–1918), was later mayor of Nelson during the 1880s. Their third son, George Fell (1848–1917), was mayor of Blenheim in the 1870s. Their fourth son, also called Arthur Fell (1850–1934), was an English solicitor and represented the Conservative Party in the Parliament of the United Kingdom. Their seventh and youngest son, Edward "Nelson" Fell (1857–1928), emigrated to the United States, where he founded two townships in Florida: Narcoossee and Fellsmere.

Seymour and Fell purchased a 20 acres (8.1 ha) section just south of Nelson bordering the Brook Stream; Bronte Street was the northern boundary. Both Seymour and Fell built houses on the land, and Fell's house, today known as Warwick House (formerly Sunnyside), still stands and is registered by the New Zealand Historic Places Trust as a Category II heritage building. Seymour planted two Quercus robur (English oak) on the banks of the Brook Stream in 1842/43, but one of the trees was washed away in a flood the following year. After a lengthy search, the tree was found downstream on the banks of the Maitai River, and replanted by either Seymour or Fell some distance away from Brook Stream. This replanted tree is still alive and is located on road reserve outside 4 Seymour Avenue. The tree was probably the first English oak to be planted in the Nelson region. The property was later also purchased by Nathaniel Edwards, and when the Edwards family subdivided the land in 1910, the resulting road was called Seymour Avenue to commemorate Fanny Fell.

Seymour died on 31 March 1883 in Kempsey near Worcester, England aged 86.
