= Alfred Fell (rugby union) =

Scotland international rugby union player

- Born: Alfred Nolan Fell; 17 January 1878 Nelson, New Zealand
- Died: 20 April 1953 (aged 75) Colchester, Essex, England
- School: Nelson College
- University: University of Edinburgh
- Notable relative(s): Charles Fell (father); Arthur Fell (uncle)
- Occupation: Medical doctor

Rugby union career
- Position: Wing
Amateur team(s)
Years	Team	Apps	(Points)
- Otago University RFC
–	Edinburgh University RFC		
Provincial / State sides
Years	Team	Apps	(Points)
1899	Edinburgh District		
1900	Cities		
International career
Years	Team	Apps	(Points)
1901–1903	Scotland	7	(6)

Alfred Nolan Fell (17 January 1878 – 20 April 1953) was a New Zealand-born international rugby union player for Scotland as a member of Edinburgh University RFC.

== Personal history ==
Fell was born at Nelson, New Zealand, on 17 January 1878, the son of Nelson mayor and painter, Charles Fell. He was educated at Nelson College (1887–1896), a school his grandfather, Alfred Fell, helped found in 1856. British politician, Sir Arthur Fell was his uncle.

He married Marion White in 1908 and had four sons and one daughter. One of his sons, Lieutenant David Walton Fell, Royal Army Medical Corps, died of wounds in North Africa on 13 November 1942.

Fell was also a keen yachtsman, a passion developed in his youth at Nelson. Fell died at his home at Church Street North, Colchester, on 19 April 1953, aged 75.

== Rugby union career ==
Fell was a noted sportsperson, playing in his college's 1st XI and 1st XV (1894–1896). He was a champion 'miler' of the Scottish Universities (1901–1902) and Edinburgh University from 1901 to 1903.

Fell was a player (1898–1905), secretary (1900–1901), and captain (1901–1903) of the Edinburgh University Rugby Football Club, which he is credited with building up to one of the best sides in the history of the game. As captain, his team's first season record read 15 wins, one draw, 425 points for and 6 against.

He had previously played in New Zealand for Otago University (1896–1897), and represented Nelson in 1896 and Otago in 1897.

Fell played for Edinburgh District against Glasgow District in 1899; and for Cities against the rest of Scotland 1900.

In 1901 he was selected for the Scottish national team as a wing three-quarters.

Date	Match	Score	Venue
9 February 1901	Scotland – Wales	18–8	
23 February 1901	Scotland – Ireland	9–5	
9 March 1901	Scotland – England	9–3	
1 February 1902	Scotland – Wales	5–14	
15 March 1902	Scotland – England	3–6	
7 February 1903	Scotland – Wales	6–0	Inverness
21 March 1903	Scotland – England	10–6	

Although picked to play, injuries in 1904 and 1905 prevented him playing in the tournament of those years.

Fell was also selected to play against New Zealand in 1905, but declined as this was his home country. Commentators from the time noted that he was a fast runner and good on attack, but lacked defensive ability.

His interest in rugby continued after he retired as a player, being one of the founders and first President of the Colchester Football Rugby Club from 1925 to 1939 and again from 1946 to 1949. The club was in recess over the war years.

== Medical career ==
Fell followed his uncle, Walter Fell, into medicine. He studied at the University of Otago and then the University of Edinburgh where he graduated MB and ChB in 1902, proceeding to the MD in 1906. He won the Muir Cup in 1900 and was a double blue that same year.

In 1905 he became a member of the Royal College of Physicians and held house appointments at the Royal Infirmary, the City Fever Hospital and the Corstorphine Convalescent Hospital in Edinburgh. He relinquished this position in 1907 and settled in general practice at Colchester in 1907. He became president of the Colchester Medical Society and was a member of the Essex Panel Committee and British Medical Association. He was honorary secretary of the North-east Essex Division from 1915 to 1917 and again from 1920 to 1921; honorary secretary of the Essex Branch from 1921 to 1924; chairman of the North-east Essex Division from 1927 to 1928, and president of the Essex Branch from 1930 to 1931.

== Military service ==
From 1918 to 1919 he served as a temporary captain in the Royal Army Medical Corps and was based in Salonika, Macedonia; Bulgaria, Serbia, and the Caucasus.

== See also ==
- Edinburgh University Rugby Football Club
- History of rugby union in Scotland
- Scotland national rugby union team
- 1901 Home Nations Championship
- 1902 Home Nations Championship
- 1903 Home Nations Championship
