= William Richmond Fell =

New Zealand naval officer (1897–1981)

Captain William Richmond Fell CMG CBE DSC
- Born: William Richmond Fell; 31 January 1897; Wellington, New Zealand
- Died: 28 November 1981 (aged 84); Wellington, New Zealand
- Relatives: Walter Fell (father); William Richmond (grandfather)
- Military career
- Allegiance: United Kingdom
- Branch: Royal Navy
- Service years: 1915–48
- Rank: Captain
- Nickname: "Tiny"
- Commands: HMS L16; HMS Oxley; HMS H31; HMS Prince Charles; HMS Titania; HMS Bonaventure; 14th Submarine Flotilla
- Conflicts: World War I World War II
- Awards: Companion of the Order of St Michael and St George; Commander of the Order of the British Empire; Distinguished Service Cross; Officer of the Legion of Merit (United States)

William Richmond Fell CMG CBE DSC (31 January 1897 – 28 November 1981), was a New Zealand naval officer. He served in the Royal Navy, mainly in submarines, and was involved in the development of human torpedoes and midget submarines during the Second World War.

== Early life and education ==
Fell was born in Wellington, New Zealand. His parents were Margaret and Walter Fell. His maternal grandfather was judge William Richmond. He was educated at Wellington College before moving to Crediton Grammar School, Devon, UK.

He joined the Royal Navy in 1915, training at the Royal Naval Engineering College, Keyham. Fell then served on the battleship HMS Warspite during 1916–17, including at the Battle of Jutland In July 1918 Fell joined the submarine training establishment HMS Dolphin at Portsmouth.

During the inter-war years, he served principally in submarines.

== Second World War ==
He was awarded the Distinguished Service Cross (DSC) for his role in the Norwegian campaign.

In January 1941 he was appointed commander of the infantry assault ship HMS Prince Charles, which had been converted from a former Belgian cross-Channel steamer. He along with the Prince Charles took part in Operation Archery, a raid on Vågsøy, Norway, in December 1941. He was mentioned in despatches for his role.

During mid-1942 at the direction of Max Horton, Flag Officer Submarines, he began working with Commander G.M. Sladen to establish and train a special underwater strike unit involving divers and human torpedoes or ‘chariots. The new unit was to supplement the project to develop midget submarines, or X-Craft, then under development by the Royal Navy. Under Fell and Sladen's leadership the unit worked off the depot ship HMS Titania, initially at Loch Èireasort on the Isle of Lewis, then from Loch Striven off the Firth of Clyde attached to HMS Varbel. During this time he was also involved in the development of the midget submarines and their method of operations. Attacks were mounted using the human torpedoes, with mixed success, at Trondheim, Askvoll, and Palermo. X-Craft were used in the successful Operation Source attack on the German battleship Tirpitz in Altafjord, September 1943.

In 1944 he was appointed to command HMS Bonaventure, depot ship for midget submarine operations. In 1945 the unit was deployed with XE-Craft to the Pacific as part of the British Pacific Fleet, where they undertook several operations against Japanese warships and also the cutting of undersea telephone cables used by Japanese military forces. Fell was appointed Commander of the Order of the British Empire (CBE) and awarded the US Legion of Merit for his service as commander of the 14th Submarine Flotilla (Midget Submarines).

== Post-war ==
Fell remained with HMS Bonaventure until November 1946, when he transferred to working in the Admiralty as a salvage officer. Fell returned to New Zealand in retirement in 1959. He died on 28 November 1981.

== Bibliography ==
- Warren, C.E.T.; Benson, J. (2007) [1953]. Above Us The Waves. George G. Harrap and Co. ISBN 1-84415-440-8.
- Fell, W.R. (1960). The Sea Surrenders. Cassell & Co.
- Fell, W.R. (1966). The Sea Our Shield. Cassell & Co.
