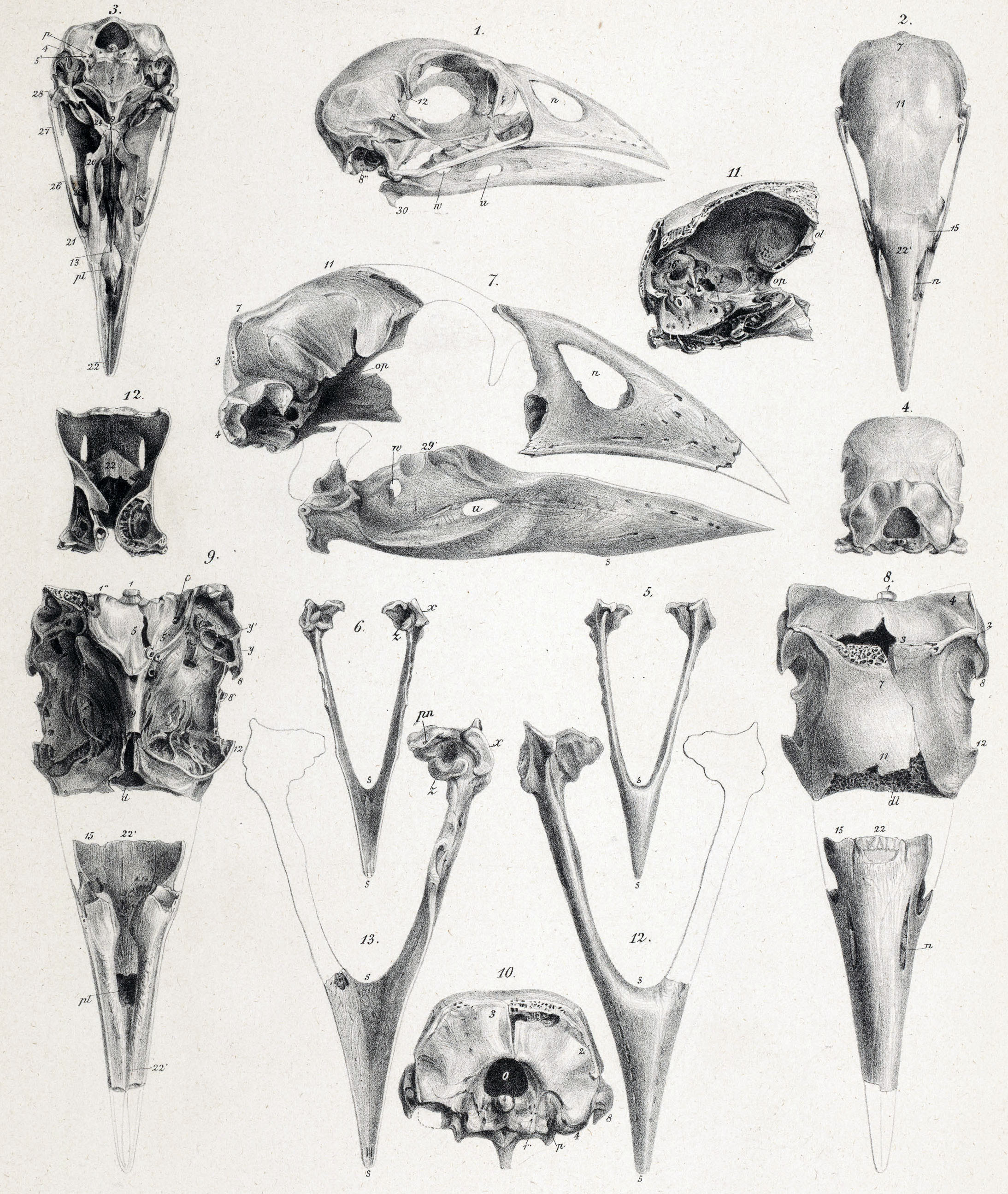
- Fossil cranial remains of P. mantelli (7-13) compared to those of a smaller, extant member of Porphyrio

Conservation status
- Extinct (1894) (IUCN 3.1)

- Extinct (1894) (NZ TCS)

Scientific classification
- Kingdom: Animalia
- Phylum: Chordata
- Class: Aves
- Order: Gruiformes
- Family: Rallidae
- Genus: Porphyrio
- Species: †P. mantelli

Binomial name
- †Porphyrio mantelli (Owen, 1848)
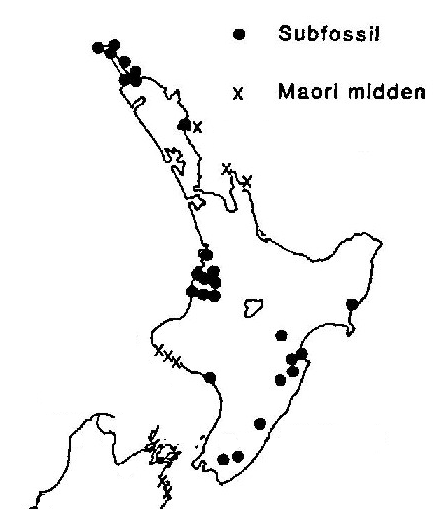
- Locations where fossils have been found

= North Island takahē =

Extinct species of bird

The North Island takahē (Māori: moho) (Porphyrio mantelli) is an extinct species of flightless swamphen that was native to the North Island of New Zealand. It is closely related to the living South Island takahē.

== Description ==
This flightless species is known from subfossils from a number of sites across North Island. The North Island takahē compared to the South island species was proportionally larger, but had a smaller premaxilla (and thus beak) relative to body size. Other differences from the South island species include the more elongate tarsometatarsus bones of the legs relative to the tibiotarsus.

== Taxonomy ==
Traditionally the North Island takahē was considered conspecific with the endangered South Island takahē. Trewick (1996) suggested that the two taxa were independently derived from two separate colonisations by flying ancestors, so proved to be separate species. However, this was challenged by the result of subsequent DNA analysis, which suggested that the two takahē species were each other's closest relatives and as such probably originated from a single colonisation of New Zealand, but were divergent enough from each other to warrant being considered distinct species, with the split estimated to have occurred 4 to 1.5 million years ago.

- Porphyrio
  - Allen's gallinule (Porphyrio alleni)
  - - - Azure gallinule (Porphyrio flavirostris)
      - American purple gallinule (Porphyrio martinica)
    - - - Black-backed swamphen (Porphyrio indicus)
        - Western swamphen (Porphyrio porphyrio)
      - - African swamphen (Porphyrio madagascariensis)
        - - - South Island takahē (Porphyrio hochstetteri)
            - †North Island takahē/Moho (Porphyrio mantelli)
          - - - Grey-headed swamphen (Porphyrio poliocephalus)
              - Philippine swamphen (Porphyrio pulverulentus)
            - Australasian swamphen (Porphyrio melanotus)

The binomial of this bird commemorates the naturalist and civil servant Walter Mantell.

== Extinction ==
The North Island takahē became extinct sometime after Māori settlement of New Zealand around 1320 AD.

Some reports have suggested that the species may have persisted until the 19th century, but this is unconfirmed. One specimen may have been taken by surveyor in the Ruahine Range in 1894 or 1898, and was recognized as one of the rare moho by elders of Ngati Muaupoko at the time. Aramoho is said to derive from the name of this bird, as the meaning of ara mohoau is 'way of the Moho'.
