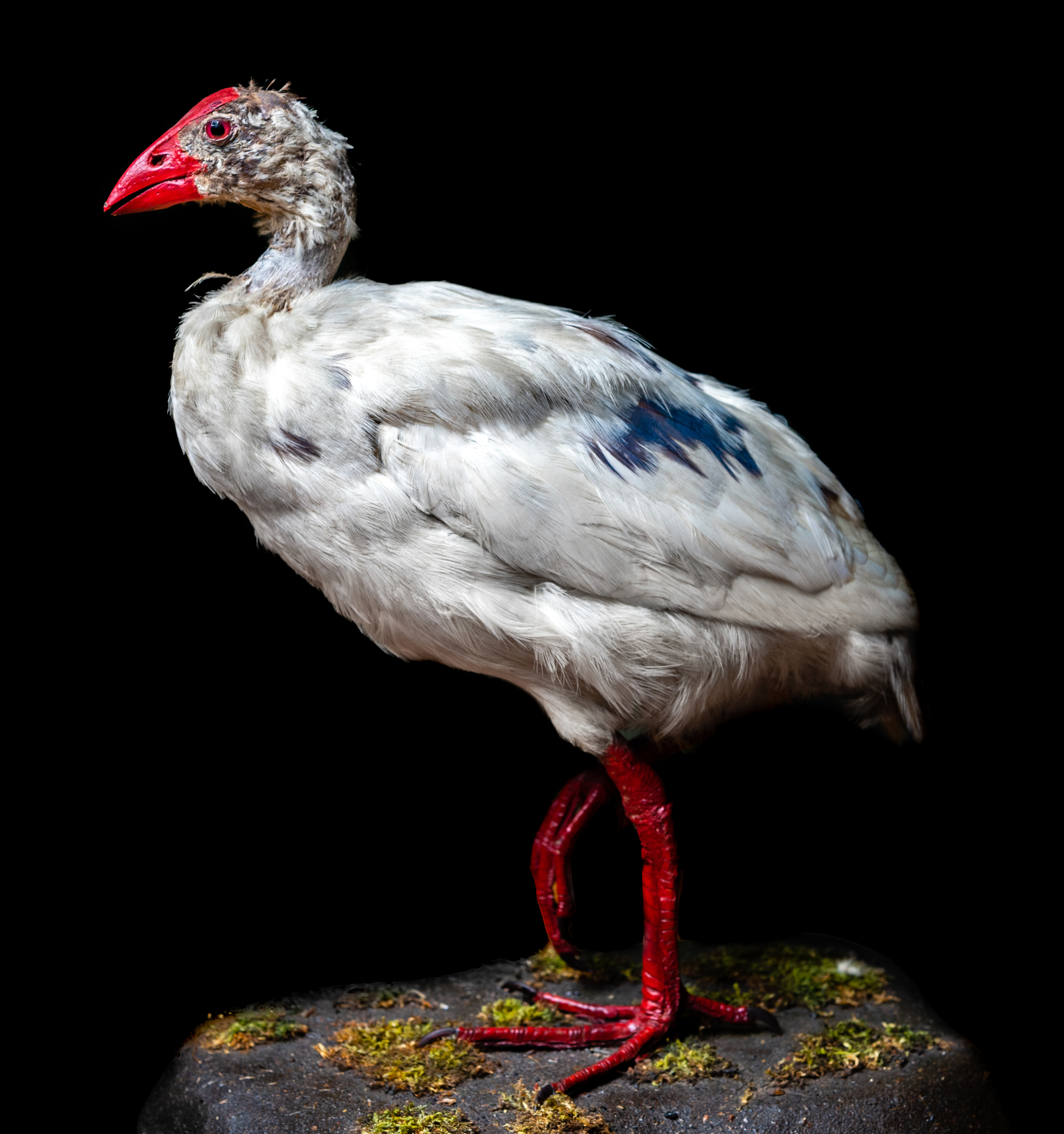
- Specimen at World Museum, Liverpool, one of two in existence. Note scattered blue feathers

Conservation status
- Extinct (probably by 1834) (IUCN 3.1)

Scientific classification
- Kingdom: Animalia
- Phylum: Chordata
- Class: Aves
- Order: Gruiformes
- Family: Rallidae
- Genus: Porphyrio
- Species: †P. albus

Binomial name
- †Porphyrio albus (Shaw, 1790)
- Location of Lord Howe Island

Synonyms
- List: Fulica alba Shaw, 1790; Gallinula alba (Latham, 1790); Porphyrio stanleyi Rowley, 1875; Porphyrio raperi Mathews, 1928; Kentrophorina alba (Mathews, 1928); Notornis alba (Pelzeln, 1860); Porphyrio albus albus (Hindwood, 1940)

= White swamphen =

Extinct species of rail from Lord Howe Island

The white swamphen (Porphyrio albus), also known as the white gallinule, the Lord Howe swamphen or the Lord Howe gallinule, is an extinct species of rail which lived on Lord Howe Island, east of Australia. It was first encountered when the crews of British ships visited the island between 1788 and 1790, and all contemporary accounts and illustrations were produced during this time. Today, two skins exist: the holotype in the Natural History Museum of Vienna, and another in Liverpool's World Museum. Although historical confusion has existed about the provenance of the specimens and the classification and anatomy of the bird, it is now thought to have been a distinct species endemic to Lord Howe Island and most similar to the Australasian swamphen. Subfossil bones have also been discovered since.

The white swamphen was 36 to 55 cm (14 to 22 in) long. Both known skins have mainly-white plumage, although the Liverpool specimen also has dispersed blue feathers. This is unlike other swamphens, but contemporary accounts indicate birds with all-white, all-blue, and mixed blue-and-white plumage. The chicks were black, becoming blue and then white as they aged. Although this has been interpreted as due to albinism, it may have been progressive greying in which feathers lose their pigment with age. The bird's bill, frontal shield and legs were red, and it had a claw (or spur) on its wing. Little was recorded about the white swamphen's behaviour. It may not have been flightless, but was probably a poor flier. This and its docility made the bird easy prey for visiting humans, who killed it with sticks. Reportedly once common, the species may have been hunted to extinction before 1834, when Lord Howe Island was settled.

== Taxonomy ==
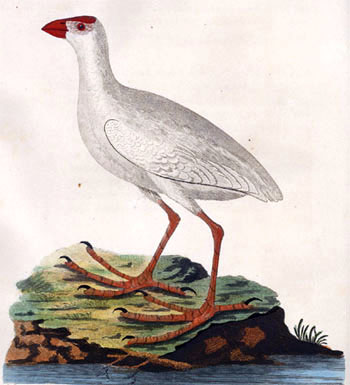
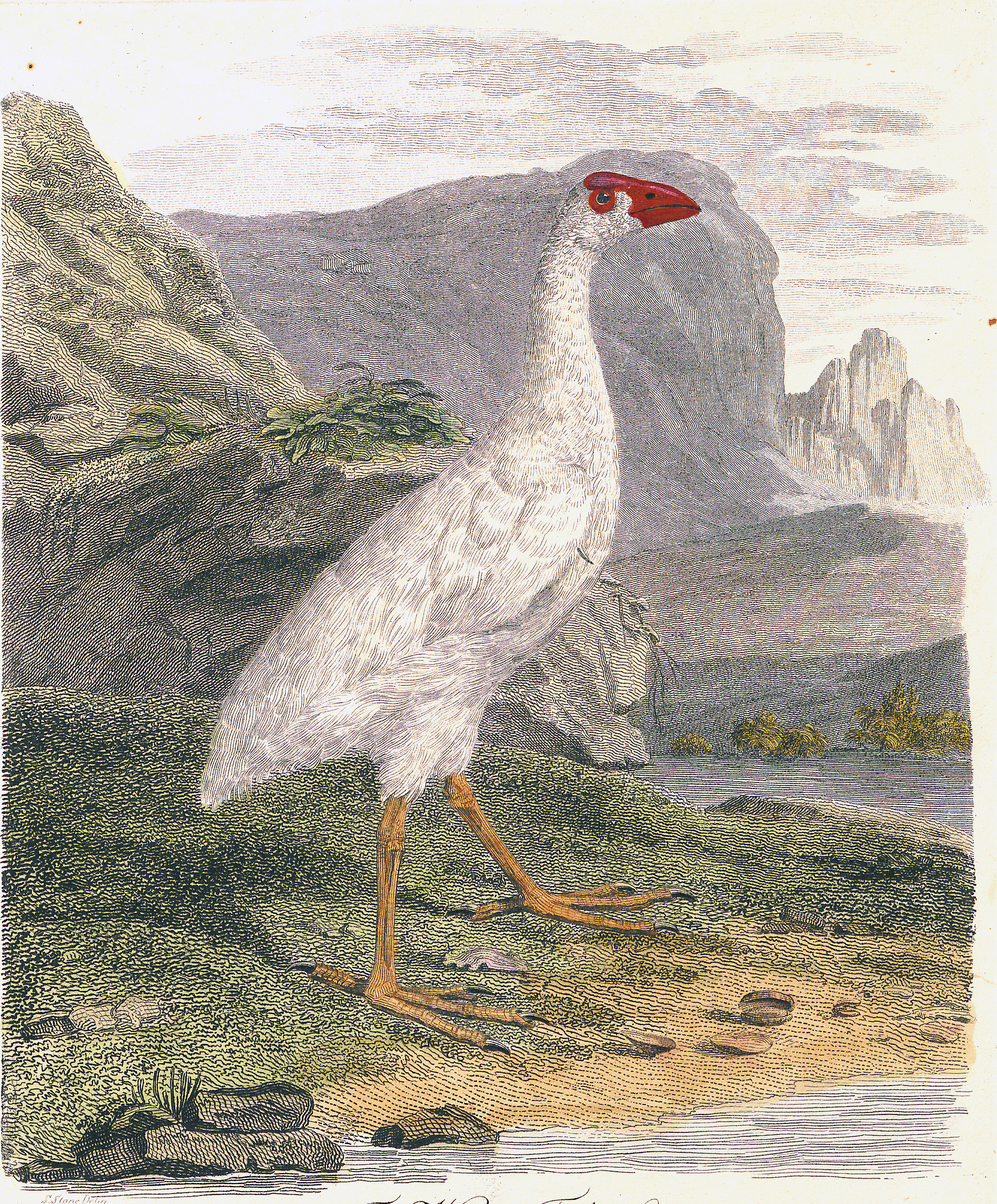
Illustration by Peter Mazell (left, probably based on a live specimen), from Arthur Phillip's 1789 book, and illustration of the Vienna holotype specimen (right) by Sarah Stone, from John White's 1790 book in which the species was named

Lord Howe Island is a small, remote island about 600 kilometres (370 mi) east of Australia. Ships first arrived on the island in 1788, including two which supplied the British penal colony on Norfolk Island and three transport ships of the British First Fleet. When HMS Supply passed the island, the ship's commander named it after First Lord of the Admiralty Richard Howe. Crews of the visiting ships captured native birds (including white swamphens), and all contemporary descriptions and depictions of the species were made between 1788 and 1790. The bird was first mentioned by the master of HMS Supply, David Blackburn, in a 1788 letter to a friend. Other accounts and illustrations were produced by Arthur Bowes Smyth, the fleet's naval officer and surgeon, who drew the first known illustration of the species; Arthur Phillip, governor of New South Wales; and George Raper, midshipman of HMS Sirius. Secondhand accounts also exist, and at least ten contemporary illustrations are known. The accounts indicate that the population varied, and individual bird plumage was white, blue, or mixed blue-and-white.

In 1790, the white swamphen was scientifically described by the surgeon John White in a book about his time in New South Wales. The binomial name in White's book, Fulica alba, was provided by the English naturalist George Shaw. The specific name is derived from the Latin word for white (albus). White found the bird most similar to the western swamphen (Porphyrio porphyrio, then in the genus Fulica). Although he apparently never visited Lord Howe Island, White may have questioned sailors and based some of his description on earlier accounts. He said he had described a skin at the Leverian Museum, and his book included an illustration of the specimen by the artist Sarah Stone. It is uncertain when (and how) the specimen arrived at the museum. This skin, the holotype specimen of the species, was purchased by the Natural History Museum of Vienna in 1806 and is catalogued as specimen NMW 50.761. The naturalist John Latham listed the bird as Gallinula alba in a later 1790 work, and wrote that it may have been a variety of purple swamphen (or "gallinule").

One other white swamphen specimen is in Liverpool's World Museum, where it is catalogued as specimen NML-VZ D3213. Obtained by the naturalist Sir Joseph Banks, it later entered the collection of the traveller William Bullock and was purchased by Lord Stanley; Stanley's son donated it to Liverpool's public museums in 1850. Although White said that the first specimen was obtained from Lord Howe Island, the provenance of the second has been unclear; it was originally said to have come from New Zealand, resulting in taxonomic confusion. Phillip wrote that the bird could also be found on Norfolk Island and elsewhere, but Latham said it could be found only on Norfolk Island. When the first specimen was sold by the Leverian Museum, it was listed as coming from New Holland (which Australia was called at the time)—perhaps because it was sent from Sydney. A note by the naturalist Edgar Leopold Layard on a contemporary illustration of the bird by Captain John Hunter inaccurately stated that it only lived on Ball's Pyramid, an islet off Lord Howe Island.

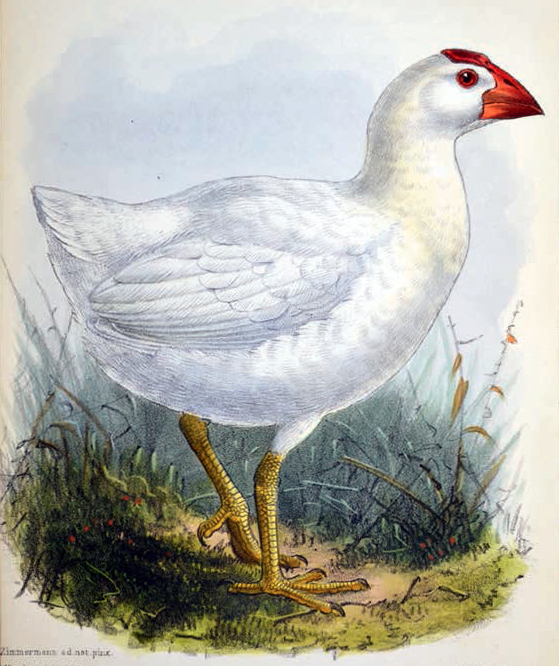
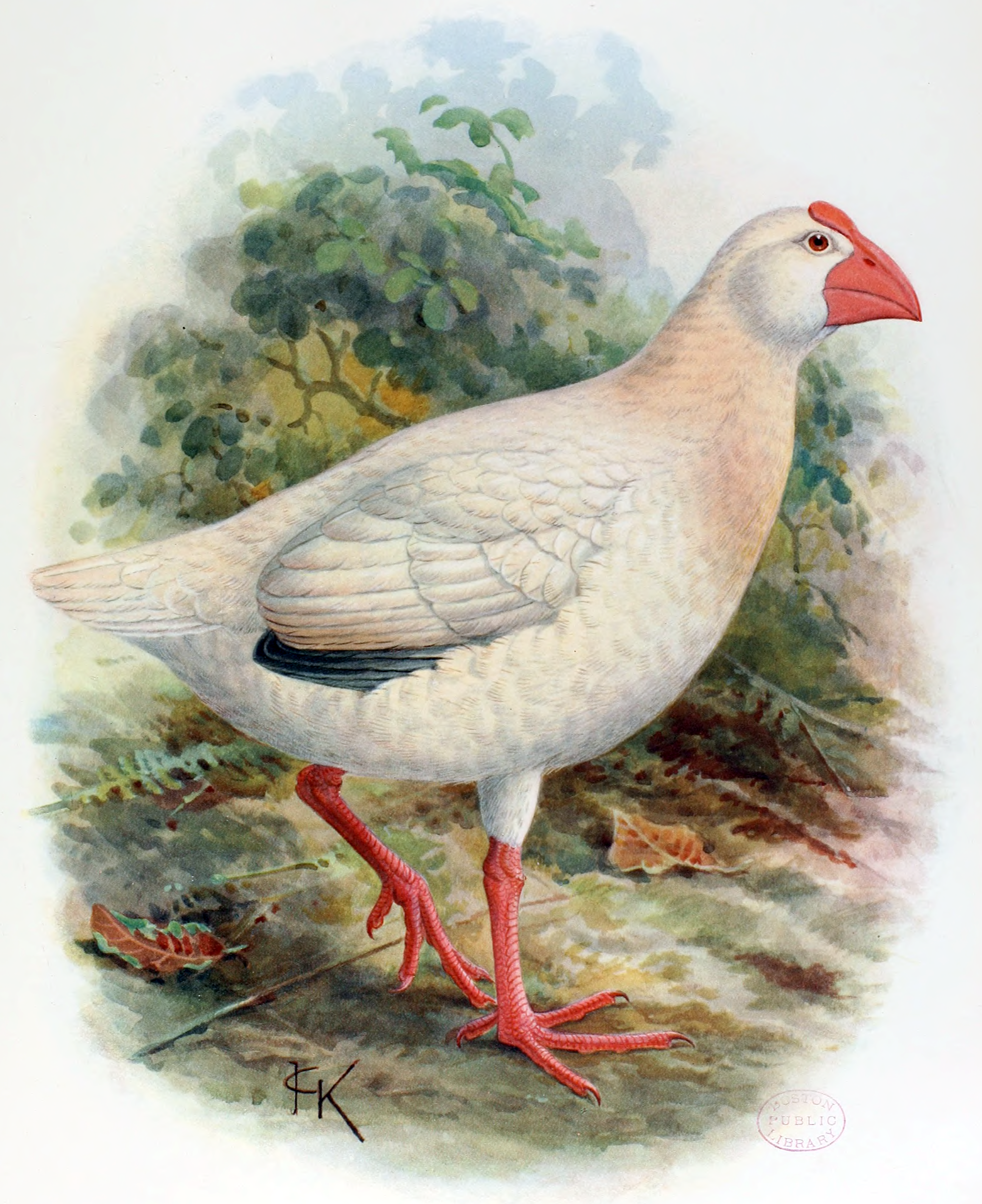
The Vienna specimen, depicted as similar to a takahē by John Gerrard Keulemans in 1873 (left) and 1907 (right, with inaccurately dark primary feathers)

The zoologist Coenraad Jacob Temminck assigned the white swamphen to the swamphen genus Porphyrio as P. albus in 1820, and the zoologist George Robert Gray considered it an albino variety of the Australasian swamphen (P. melanotus) as P. m. varius alba in 1844. The belief that the bird was simply an albino was held by several later writers, and many failed to notice that White cited Lord Howe Island as the origin of the Vienna specimen. In 1860 and 1873, the ornithologist August von Pelzeln said that the Vienna specimen had come from Norfolk Island, and assigned the species to the genus Notornis as N. alba; the takahē (P. hochstetteri) of New Zealand was also placed in that genus at the time. In 1873, the naturalist Osbert Salvin agreed that the Lord Howe Island bird was similar to the takahē, although he had apparently never seen the Vienna specimen, basing his conclusion on a drawing provided by von Pelzeln. Salvin included a takahē-like illustration of the Vienna specimen by the artist John Gerrard Keulemans, based on von Pelzeln's drawing, in his article.

In 1875, the ornithologist George Dawson Rowley noted differences between the Vienna and Liverpool specimens and named a new species based on the latter: P. stanleyi, named after Lord Stanley. He believed that the Liverpool specimen was a juvenile from Lord Howe Island or New Zealand, and continued to believe that the Vienna specimen was from Norfolk Island. Despite naming the new species, Rowley considered the possibility that P. stanleyi was an albino Australasian swamphen and considered the Vienna bird more similar to the takahē. In 1901, the ornithologist Henry Ogg Forbes had the Liverpool specimen dismounted so he could examine it for damage. Forbes found it similar enough to the Vienna specimen to belong to the same species, N. alba. The zoologist Walter Rothschild considered the two species distinct from each other in 1907, but placed them both in the genus Notornis. Rothschild thought that the image published by Phillip in 1789 depicted N. stanleyi from Lord Howe Island, and the image published by White in 1790 showed N. alba from Norfolk Island. He disagreed that the specimens were albinos, thinking instead that they were evolving into a white species. Rothschild published an illustration of N. alba by Keulemans where it is similar to a takahē, inaccurately showing it with dark primary feathers, although the Vienna specimen on which it was based is all white. In 1910, the ornithologist Tom Iredale demonstrated that there was no proof of the white swamphen existing anywhere but on Lord Howe Island and noted that early visitors to Norfolk Island (such as Captain James Cook and Lieutenant Philip Gidley King) did not mention the bird. In 1913, after examining the Vienna specimen, Iredale concluded that the bird belonged in the genus Porphyrio and did not resemble the takahē.

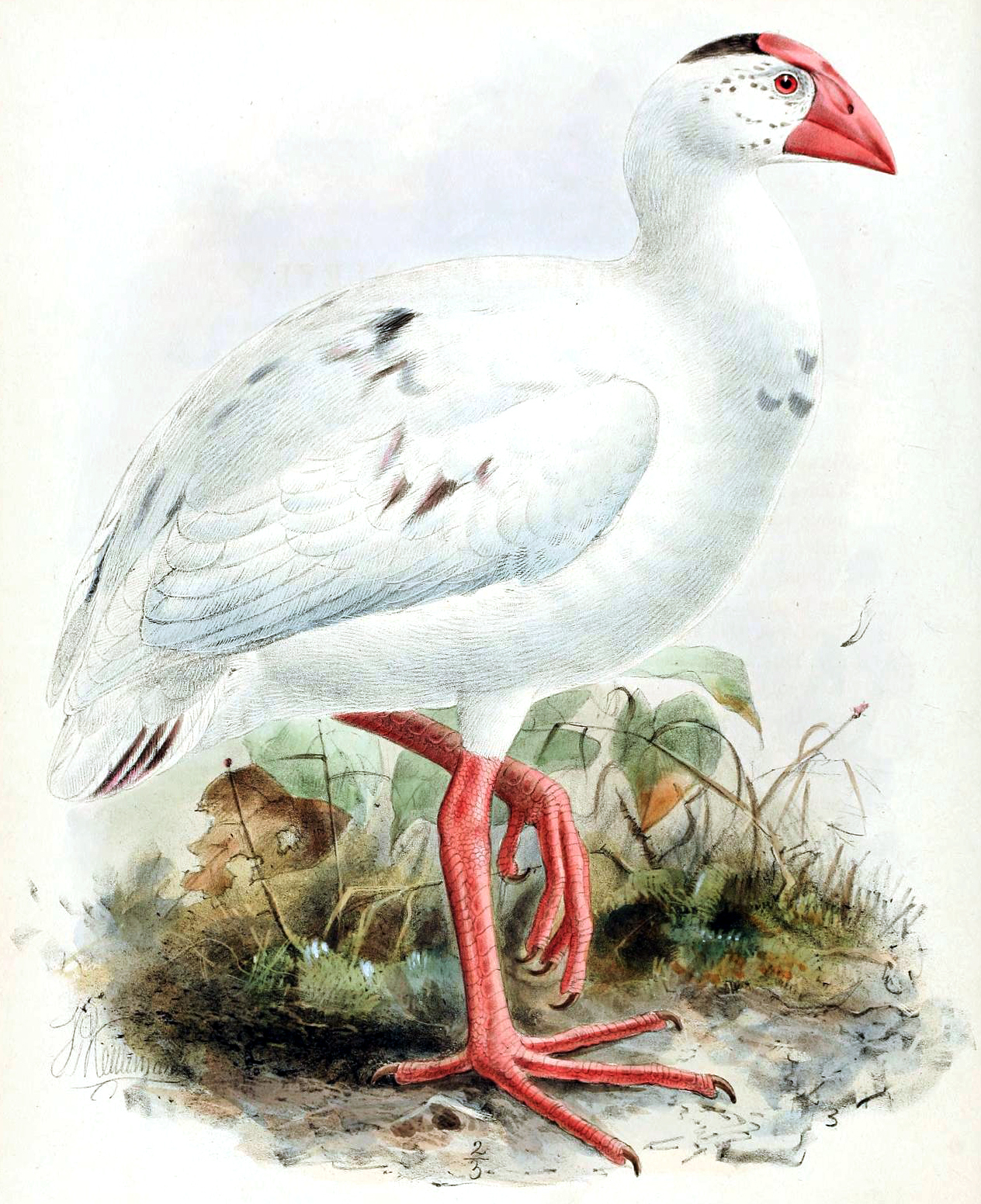
Illustration of the Liverpool specimen, the holotype of P. stanleyi (a junior synonym of P. albus), by Keulemans, 1875

In 1928, the ornithologist Gregory Mathews discussed a 1790 painting by Raper which he thought differed enough from P. albus in proportions and colouration that he named a new species based on it: P. raperi. Mathews also considered P. albus distinct enough to warrant a new genus, Kentrophorina, due to having a claw (or spur) on one wing. In 1936, he conceded that P. raperi was a synonym of P. albus. The ornithologist Keith Alfred Hindwood agreed that the bird was an albino P. melanotus in 1932, and pointed out that the naturalists Johann Reinhold Forster and Georg Forster (his son) did not record the bird when Cook's ship visited Norfolk Island in 1774. In 1940, Hindwood found the white swamphen so closely related to the Australasian swamphen that he considered them subspecies of the same species: P. albus albus and P. albus melanotus (since albus is the older name). Hindwood suggested that the population on Lord Howe Island was white; blue Australasian swamphens occasionally arrived (stragglers from elsewhere have been found on the island) and bred with the white birds, accounting for the blue and partially-blue individuals in the old accounts. He also pointed out that Australasian swamphens are prone to white feathering. In 1941, the biologist Ernst Mayr proposed that the white swamphen was a partially-albinistic population of Australasian swamphens. Mayr suggested that the blue swamphens remaining on Lord Howe Island were not stragglers, but had survived because they were less conspicuous than the white ones. In 1967, the ornithologist James Greenway also considered the white swamphen a subspecies (with P. stanleyi a synonym) and considered the white individuals albinos. He suggested that the similarities between the wing feathers of the white swamphen and the takahē were due to parallel evolution in two isolated populations of reluctant fliers.

The ornithologist Sidney Dillon Ripley found the white swamphen to be intermediate between the takahē and the purple swamphen in 1977, based on patterns of the leg-scutes, and reported that X-rays of bones also showed similarities with the takahē. He considered only the Vienna specimen to be a white swamphen, whereas he considered the Liverpool specimen to be an albino Australasian swamphen (listing P. stanleyi as a junior synonym of that bird) from New Zealand. In 1991, the ornithologist Ian Hutton reported subfossil bones of the white swamphen. Hutton agreed that the birds described as having white-and-blue feathers were hybrids between the white swamphen and the Australasian swamphen, an idea also considered by the ornithologists Barry Taylor and Ber van Perlo in 2000. In 2000, the writer Errol Fuller said that since swamphens are widespread colonists, it would be expected that populations would evolve similarly to the takahē when they found refuges without mammals (losing flight and becoming bulkier with stouter legs, for example); this was the case with the white swamphen. Fuller suggested that they could be called "white takahēs", which had been alluded to earlier; the white birds may have been a colour morph of the population, or the blue birds may have been Australasian swamphens which associated with the white birds.

In 2015, the biologists Juan C. Garcia-R. and Steve A. Trewick analysed the DNA of the purple swamphens. They found that the white swamphen was most closely related to the Philippine swamphen (P. pulverulentus), and the black-backed swamphen (P. indicus) more closely related to both than to other species in its region. Garcia-R. and Trewick used DNA from the Vienna specimen, but were unable to obtain usable DNA from the Liverpool specimen. They suggested that the white swamphen may have descended from a few migrant Philippine swamphens during the late Pleistocene (about 500,000 years ago), dispersing over other islands. This indicates a complex history, since their lineages are not recorded on the islands between them; according to the biologists, such results (based on ancient DNA sources) should be treated with caution. Although many purple swamphen taxa had been considered subspecies of the species P. porphyrio, they considered this a paraphyletic (unnatural) grouping since they found different species to group among the subspecies. The cladogram below shows the phylogenetic position of the white swamphen according to the 2015 study:

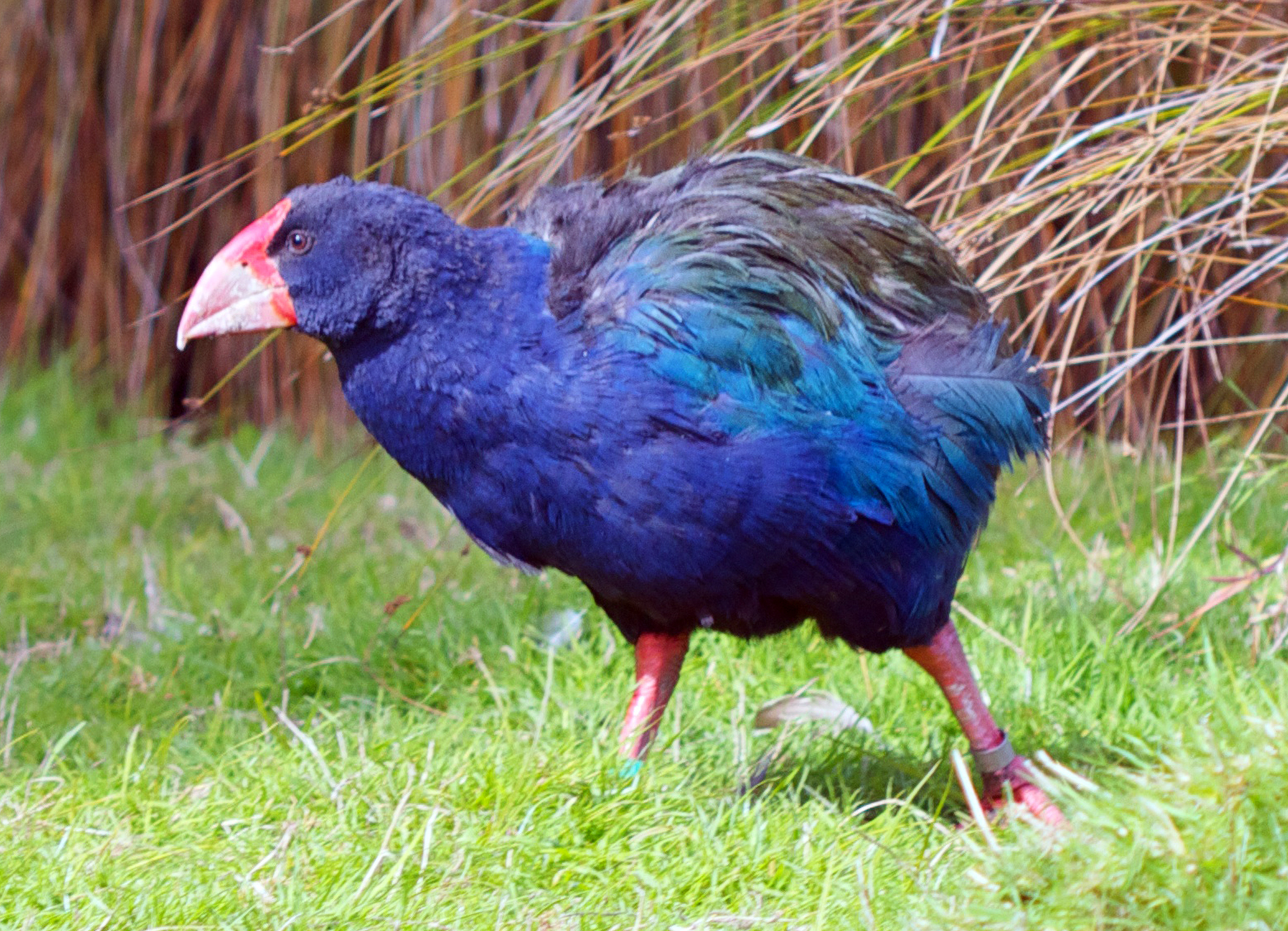
The takahē was once considered a close relative by some writers

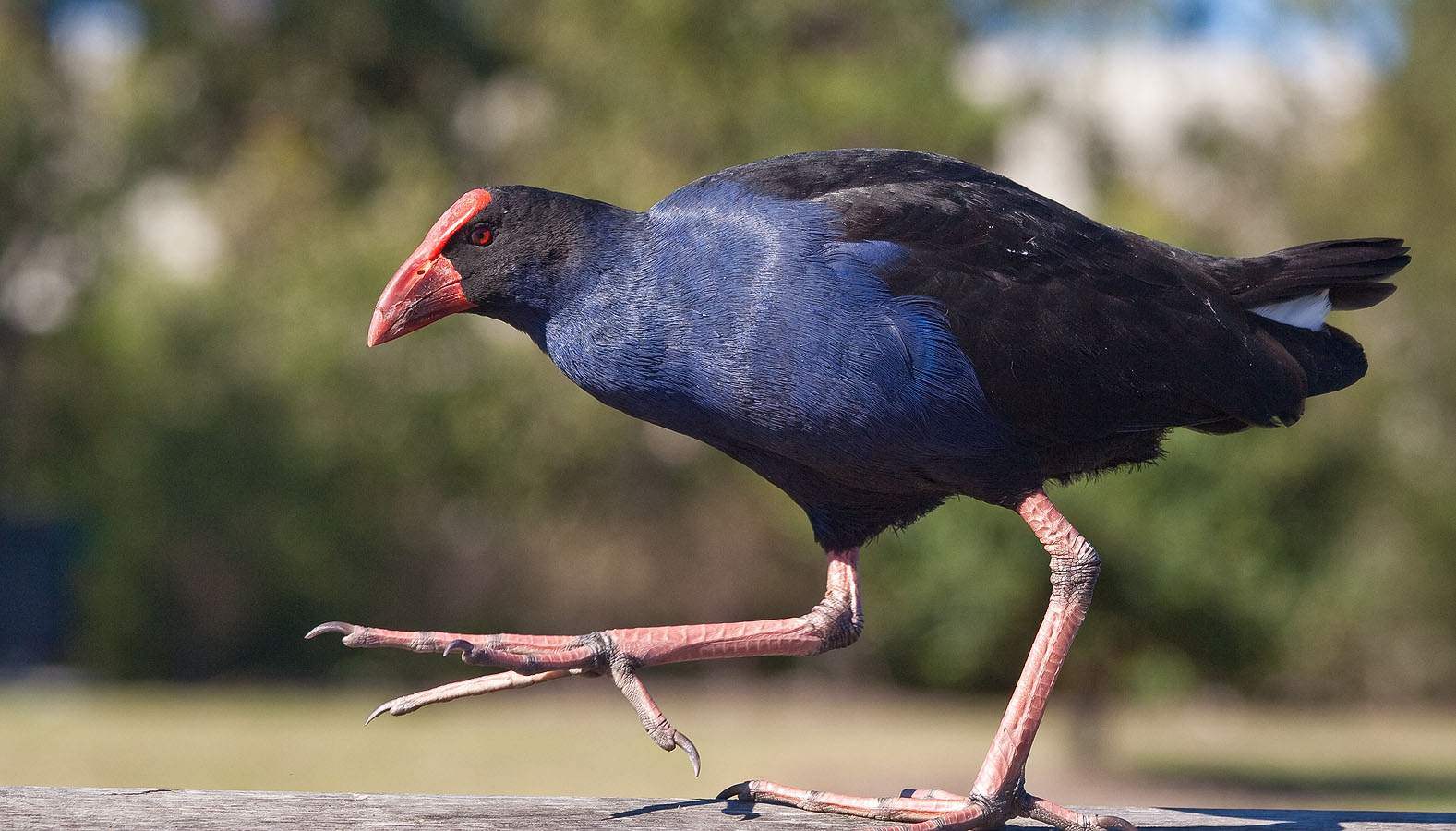
The Australasian swamphen is an anatomically similar and perhaps closely related species

- - P. alleni (1)
  - - - P. martinica (2)
      - P. flavirostris (3)
    - Clade A
      - - P. p. porphyrio (1 sample)
        - P. p. indicus (7 samples)
      - - P. p. madagascariensis (1 sample)
        - - P. hochstetteri (#4)
          - - P. mantelli (#5)
            - - - Clade B
                  - P. p. melanotus (35 samples)
                  - P. p. bellus (5 samples)
                - - - P. p. pulverulentus (1 sample)
                    - - P. albus (#6)
                      - P. p. indicus (1 sample)
                  - - P. p. seistanicus (1 sample)
                    - P. p. poliocephalus (8 samples)

The ornithologists Hein van Grouw and Julian P. Hume concluded in 2016 that many of the old accounts had errors in the bird's provenance, that it was endemic to Lord Howe Island, and suggested when the specimens were collected (between March and May 1788) and under which circumstances they arrived in England. They concluded that the white swamphen was a valid species which changed colouration with age, after reconstructing the colouration of juvenile birds before turning white (which was distinct from other swamphens). Van Grouw and Hume found the white swamphen anatomically more similar to the Australasian swamphen than the Philippine swamphen, and suggested that studies with more-complete data sets than the earlier DNA might yield different results. Due to their anatomical similarities, geographic proximity and the recolonisation of Lord Howe and Norfolk Island by Australasian swamphens, they found it likely that the white swamphen was descended from Australasian swamphens.

In 2021, Hume and colleagues reported the results of their palaeontological reconnaissance of Lord Howe Island, which included the discovery of subfossil white swamphen bones. A complete pelvis and representatives of most limb bones were found in the dunes of Blinky Beach (situated at the end of an airport runway), and the authors stated these would provide new insight into the morphology and behaviour of the species.

== Description ==
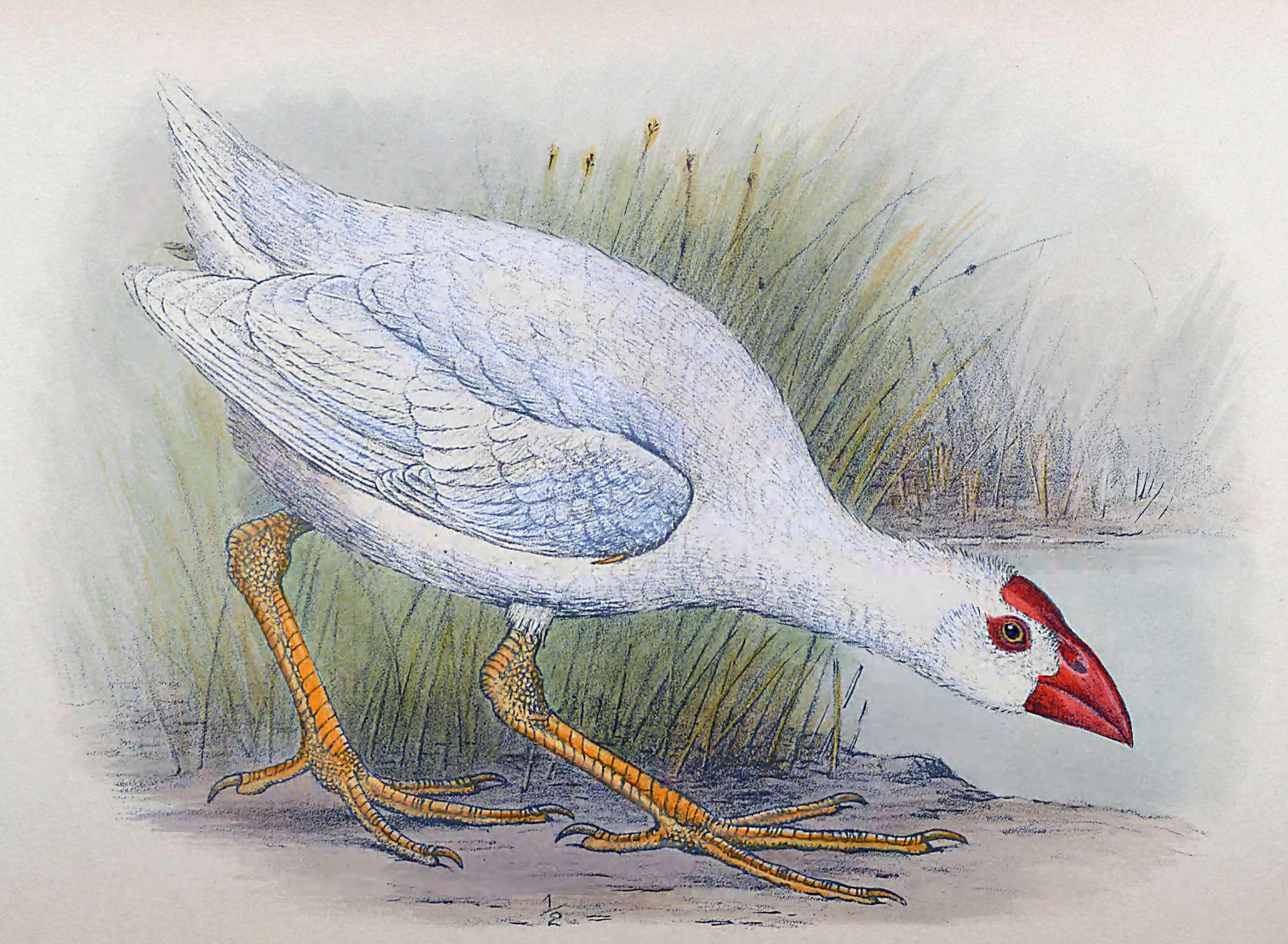
Illustration by Henrik Grönvold, 1928; the legs were probably red in life

The length of the white swamphen has been given as 36 cm (14 in) and 55 cm (22 in), making it similar to the Australasian swamphen in size. Its wings were proportionally the shortest of all swamphens. The wing of the Vienna specimen is 218 mm (9 in) mm long, the tail is 73.3 mm (3 in), the culmen with its frontal shield (the fleshy plate on the head) is 79 mm (3 in), the tarsus is 86 mm (3 in), and the middle toe is 77.7 mm (3 in) long. The wing of the Liverpool specimen is 235 mm (9 in) long, the tarsus is 88.4 mm (3 in) and the middle toe is 66.5 mm (3 in). Its tail and beak are damaged, and cannot be reliably measured. The white swamphen differed from most other swamphens (except the Australasian swamphen) in having a short middle toe; it is the same length as the tarsus, or longer, in other species. The white swamphen's tail was also the shortest. Both specimens have a claw (or spur) on their wings; it is longer and more discernible in the Vienna specimen, and sharp and buried in the feathers of the Liverpool specimen. This feature is variable among other kinds of swamphen. The softness of the rectrices (tail feathers) and the lengths of the secondary and wing covert feathers relative to the primary feathers appear to have been intermediate between those of the purple swamphen and the takahē.

Although the known skins are mostly white, contemporary illustrations depict some blue individuals; others had a mixture of white and blue feathers. Their legs were red or yellow, but the latter colour may be present only on dried specimens. The bill and frontal shield were red, and the iris was red or brown. According to notes written on an illustration by an unknown artist (in the collection of the artist Thomas Watling, inaccurately dated 1792), the chicks were black and became bluish-grey and then white as they matured. The Vienna specimen is pure white, but the Liverpool specimen has yellowish reflections on its neck and breast, blackish-blue feathers speckled on the head (concentrated near the upper surface of the shield) and neck, blue feathers on the breast, and purplish-blue feathers on the shoulders, back, scapular, and lesser covert feathers. Some of the rectrices (tail feathers) are purplish-brown, and some of the scapular feathers and those on the mid-back are sooty-brown at the base and sooty-blue further up. The central rectrices are sooty-brown and bluish. This colouration indicates that the Liverpool specimen was a younger bird than the Vienna specimen, and the latter had reached the final stage of maturity. Since the Liverpool specimen preserves some of its original colour, van Grouw, and Hume were able to reconstruct its natural colouration before becoming white. It differed from other swamphens in having blackish-blue lores, forehead, crown, nape, and hind neck; purple-blue mantle, back, and wings; a darker rump and upper-tail covert feathers; and dark greyish-blue underparts.

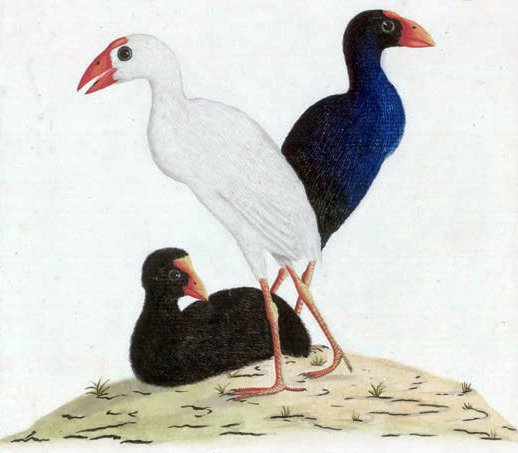
Illustration by an unknown artist (in the collection of Thomas Watling), showing the bird's three colour stages

Phillip gave a detailed description in 1789, possibly based on a live bird he received in Sydney:

This beautiful bird greatly resembles the purple Gallinule in shape and make, but is much superior in size, being as large as a dunghill fowl. The length from the end of the bill to that of the claws is two feet three inches; the bill is very stout, and the colour of it, the whole top of the head, and the irides red; the sides of the head around the eyes are reddish, very thinly sprinkled with white feathers; the whole of the plumage without exception is white. The legs the colour of the bill. This species is pretty common on Lord Howe's Island, Norfolk Island, and other places, and is a very tame species. The other sex, supposed to be the male, is said to have some blue on the wings.

=== Condition of the specimens ===
The Vienna specimen is today a study skin with its legs outstretched (not a taxidermy mount), but van Grouw and Hume suggested that Stone's 1790 illustration showed its original mounted pose. It is in good condition; although the legs are faded to a pale orange-brown, they were probably reddish in the living bird. It has no yellowish or purple feathers, contradicting Rothschild's observation. Forbes suggested that the Liverpool specimen was "remade" and mounted after Stone's illustration, though its present pose is dissimilar. Keulemans's illustration of the mount shows the present pose, so Forbes was either incorrect or a new pose was based on Keulemans's image. The Liverpool specimen is in good condition, although it has lost some feathers from its head and neck. The bill is broken, and its rhamphotheca (the keratinous covering of the bill) is missing; the underlying bone was painted red to simulate an undamaged bill, which has caused some confusion. The legs have also been painted red, and there is no indication of their original colouration. The reason only white specimens are known today may be collecting bias; unusually-coloured specimens are more likely to be collected than normally-coloured ones.

== Behaviour and ecology ==
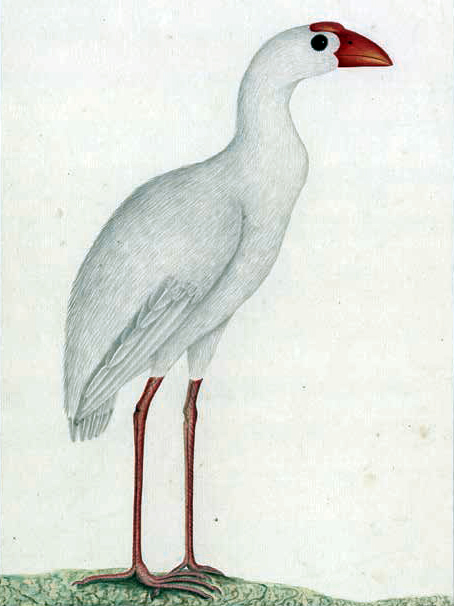
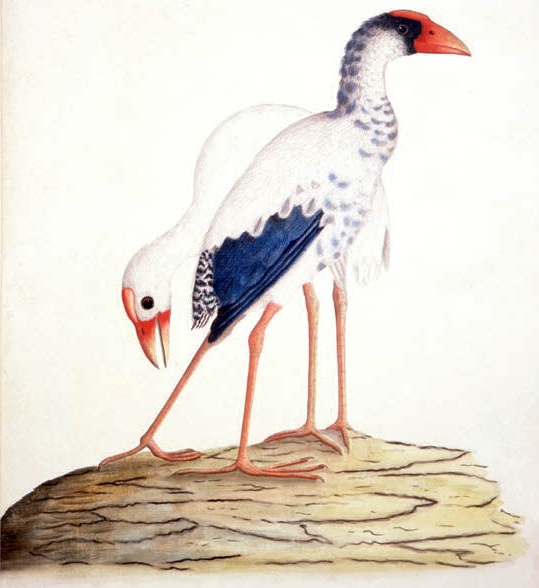
Illustration of presumably live birds by George Raper, 1790; the left image is the basis of the junior synonym P. raperi, and the right shows one white and one still-variegated individual

The white swamphen inhabited wooded lowland areas in wetlands. Nothing was recorded about its social and reproductive behaviour and its nest, eggs and call were never described. Presumably it did not migrate. Blackburn's 1788 account is the only one that mentions the diet of this bird:

... On the shore we caught several sorts of birds ... and a white fowl – something like a Guinea hen, with a very strong thick & sharp pointed bill of a red colour – stout legs and claws – I believe they are carnivorous they hold their food between the thumb or hind claw & the bottom of the foot & lift it to the mouth without stopping so much as a parrot.

Some contemporary accounts indicated that the bird was flightless. Rowley considered the Liverpool specimen (representing the separate species P. stanleyi) capable of flight, due to its longer wings; Rothschild believed that both were flightless, although he was inconsistent about whether their wings were the same length. Van Grouw and Hume found that both specimens showed evidence of an increased terrestrial lifestyle (including decreased wing length, more robust feet and short toes), and were in the process of becoming flightless. Although it may still have been capable of flight, it was behaviourally flightless, similar to other island birds, such as some parrots. Though the white swamphen was similar in size to the Australasian swamphen, it had proportionally shorter wings and therefore a higher wing load – perhaps the highest of all swamphens. Upon the discovery of subfossil pelvic and limb bones in 2021, Hume and colleagues preliminarily stated that these bones were much more robust in the white swamphen than in the volant Australasian swamphen, a trait common in flightless rails.

Van Grouw and Hume pointed out that a white colour aberration in birds is rarely caused by albinism (which is less common than formerly believed), but by leucism or progressive greying – a phenomenon van Grouw described in 2012 and 2013. These conditions produce white feathers due to the absence of cells which produce the pigment melanin. Leucism is inherited, and the white feathering is present in juveniles and does not change with age; progressive greying causes normally-coloured juveniles to lose pigment-producing cells with age, and they become white as they moult. Since contemporary accounts indicate that the white swamphen turned from black to bluish-grey and then white, Van Grouw and Hume concluded that it underwent inheritable progressive greying. Progressive greying is a common cause of white feathers in many types of birds (including rails), although such specimens have sometimes been inaccurately referred to as albinos. The condition does not affect carotenoid pigments (red and yellow), and the bill and legs of the white swamphens retained their colouration. The large number of white individuals on Lord Howe Island may be due to its small founding population, which would have facilitated the spread of inheritable progressive greying.

== Extinction ==
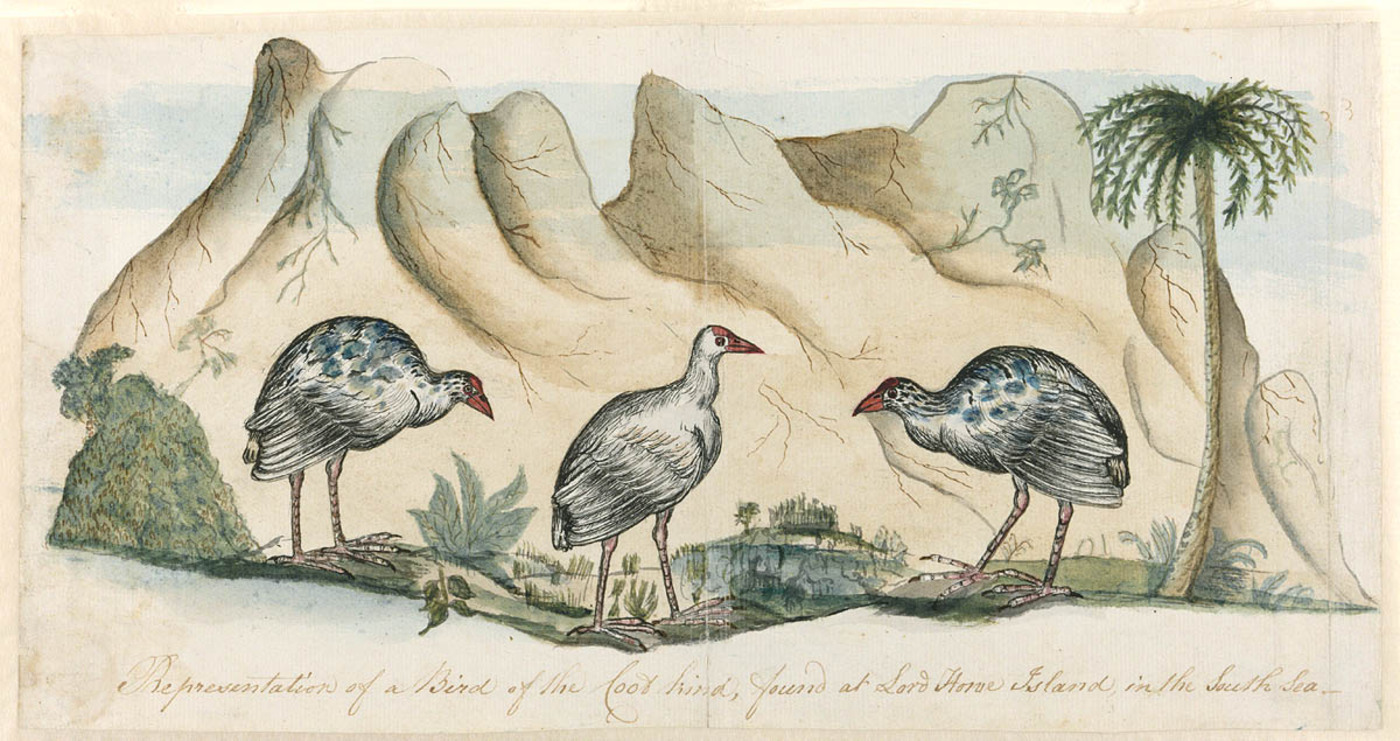
Three live birds by Arthur Bowes Smyth c. 1788, the first known illustration of this species

Although the white swamphen was considered common during the late 18th century, it appears to have disappeared quickly; the period from the island's discovery to the last mention of living birds is only two years (1788–90). It had probably vanished by 1834, when Lord Howe Island was first settled, or during the following decade. Whalers and sealers had used the island for supplies, and may have hunted the bird to extinction. Habitat destruction probably did not play a role, and animal predators (such as rats and cats) arrived later. Several contemporary accounts stress the ease with which the island's birds were hunted, and the large number which could be taken to provision ships. In 1789, White described how the white swamphen could be caught:

They [sailors] also found on it, in great plenty, a kind of fowl, resembling much of the Guinea fowl in shape and size, but widely different in colour; they being in general all white, with a red fleshy substance rising, like a cock's comb, from the head, and not unlike a piece of sealing-wax. These not being birds of flight, nor in the least wild, the sailors availing themselves of their gentleness and inability to take wing from their pursuits, easily struck them down with sticks.

The fact that they could be killed with sticks may have been due to their poor flying ability, which would have made them vulnerable to human predation. With no natural enemies on the island, they were tame and curious. The physician John Foulis conducted a mid-1840s ornithological survey on the island but did not mention the bird, so it was almost certainly extinct by that time. In 1909, the writer Arthur Francis Basset Hull expressed hope that the bird still survived in unexplored mountains.

Eight types of bird have become extinct due to human interference since Lord Howe Island was discovered, including the Lord Howe pigeon (Columba vitiensis godmanae), the Lord Howe parakeet (Cyanoramphus subflavescens), the Lord Howe gerygone (Gerygone insularis), the Lord Howe fantail (Rhipidura fuliginosa cervina), the Lord Howe thrush (Turdus poliocephalus vinitinctus), the robust white-eye (Zosterops strenuus) and the Lord Howe starling (Aplonis fusca hulliana). The extinction of so many native birds is similar to extinctions on several other islands, such as the Mascarenes.

== See also ==
- List of recently extinct bird species
