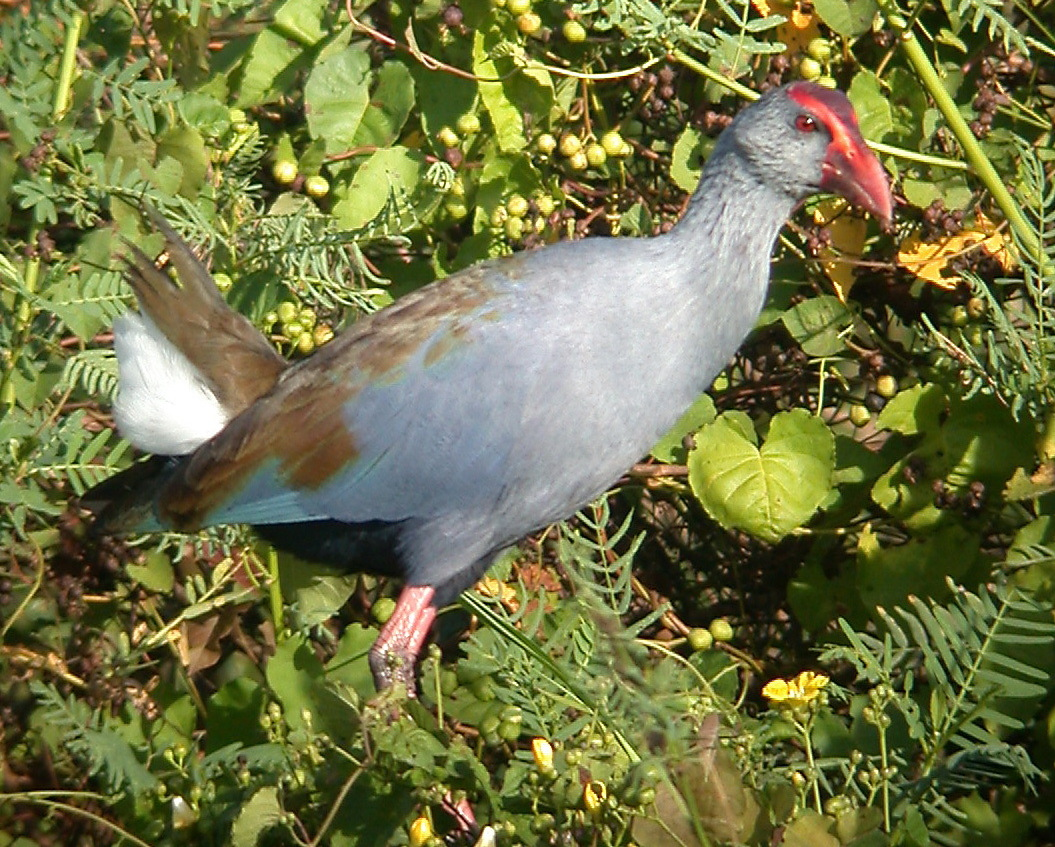

Scientific classification
- Kingdom: Animalia
- Phylum: Chordata
- Class: Aves
- Order: Gruiformes
- Family: Rallidae
- Genus: Porphyrio
- Species: P. pulverulentus

Binomial name
- Porphyrio pulverulentus Temminck, 1826

Synonyms
- Porphyrio porphyrio pulverulentus

= Philippine swamphen =

Species of bird

Philippine swamphen (Porphyrio pulverulentus Temminck, 1826) is a species of swamphen occurring in the Philippines and in the Talaud Islands, Indonesia. In the Philippines, it is found on Luzon, Mindanao, and other larger islands. Its habitat is dense reedbeds in swamps and wetlands, and fringing vegetation by lakes, ponds and rivers.

It used to be considered a subspecies of the purple swamphen; it differs from other members of this group in having olive-brown mantle and scapulars, and the head and body are tinged with ash-grey.

== Description and taxonomy ==
It is part of the purple swamphen species complex which also includes the Australasian swamphen, grey-headed swamphen, western swamphen, African swamphen and black-backed swamphen but was differentiated through molecular studies, and its browner back and paler body.

This species is monotypic.

== Ecology and behavior ==
There have been no species specific studies on its breeding and diet but it is pressumed to have the same behavior as the purple swamphen species complex. Primarily feeds on vegetable matter such as roots, shoots, stems, flowers and leaves. Also feeds on insects, mollusks and small vertebrates. Uses its bill and legs to cut up food. Typically seen foraging on the shore in shallow water and in floating vegetation.

It lives in communal groups and multiple females lay in one single communal nest with all members helping in raising the young.

== Habitat and conservation status ==
This species occupies a variety of wetlands fresh or brackish ponds, lakes, canals and rivers with overgrown vegetation.

IUCN has yet to assess this bird as it still accepts the purple swamphens as one species. It is likely that the population is declining. These birds are generally uncommon, and its wetland habitat is in danger of being converted into farmland and residential areas.

In the 2010s, Black-backed swamphen and/or Australasian swamphens have been reported in Mindanao and Western Visayas where they have now become the dominant species and have replaced Philippine swamphens. In 2023, it was first reported in Rizal. It is unknown if it spreading and slowly replacing the birds on Luzon.
