= Wasit Wetland Centre =

Protected area in the United Arab Emirates

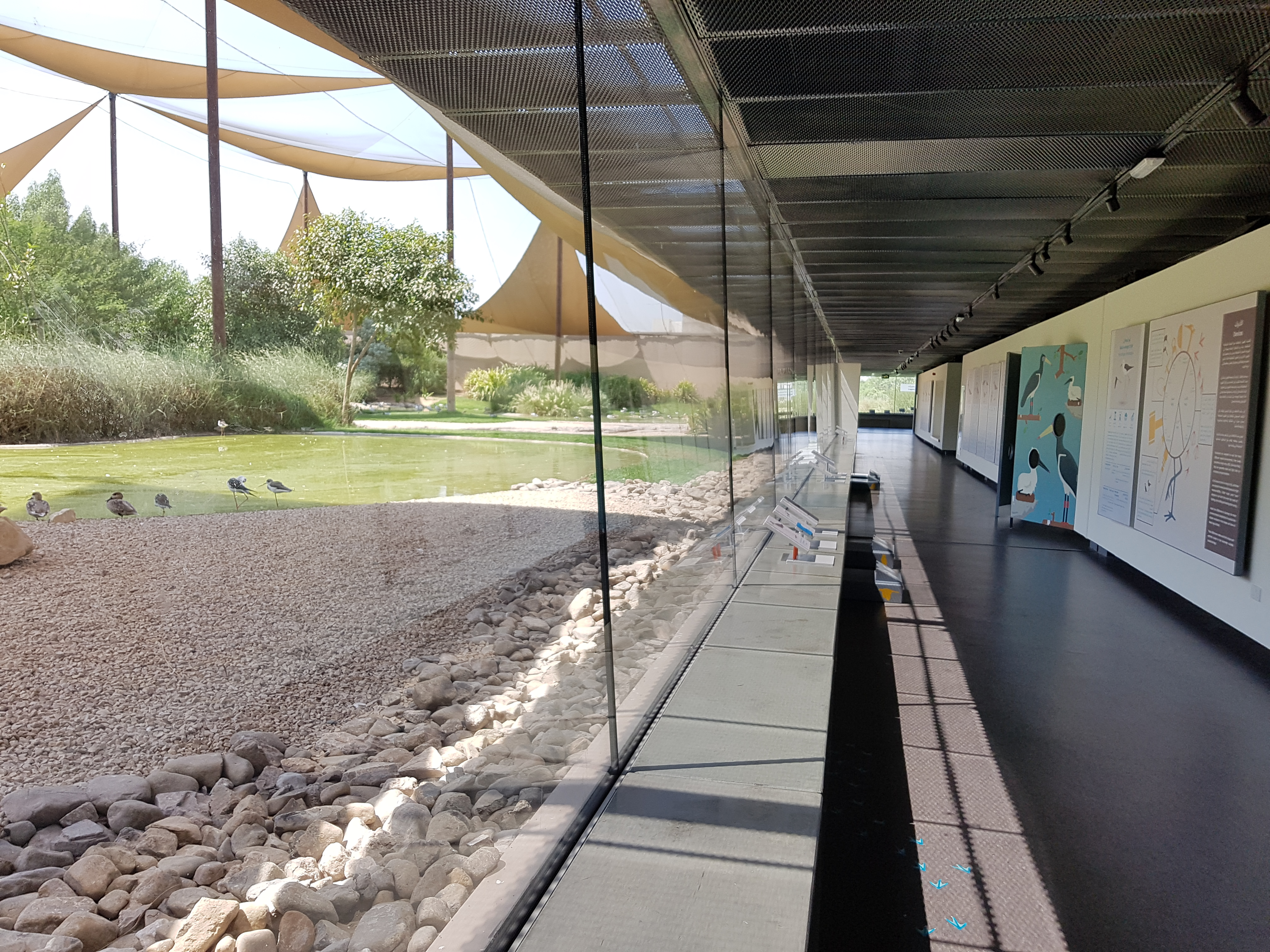
- Interactive map of Wasit Wetland Centre
- Coordinates: 25.366°N 55.464°E
- Area: 86 hectares (210 acres)
- Established: 2015
- Governing body: City of Sharjah

Ramsar Wetland
- Official name: Wasit Nature Reserve
- Designated: 9 May 2019
- Reference no.: 2386

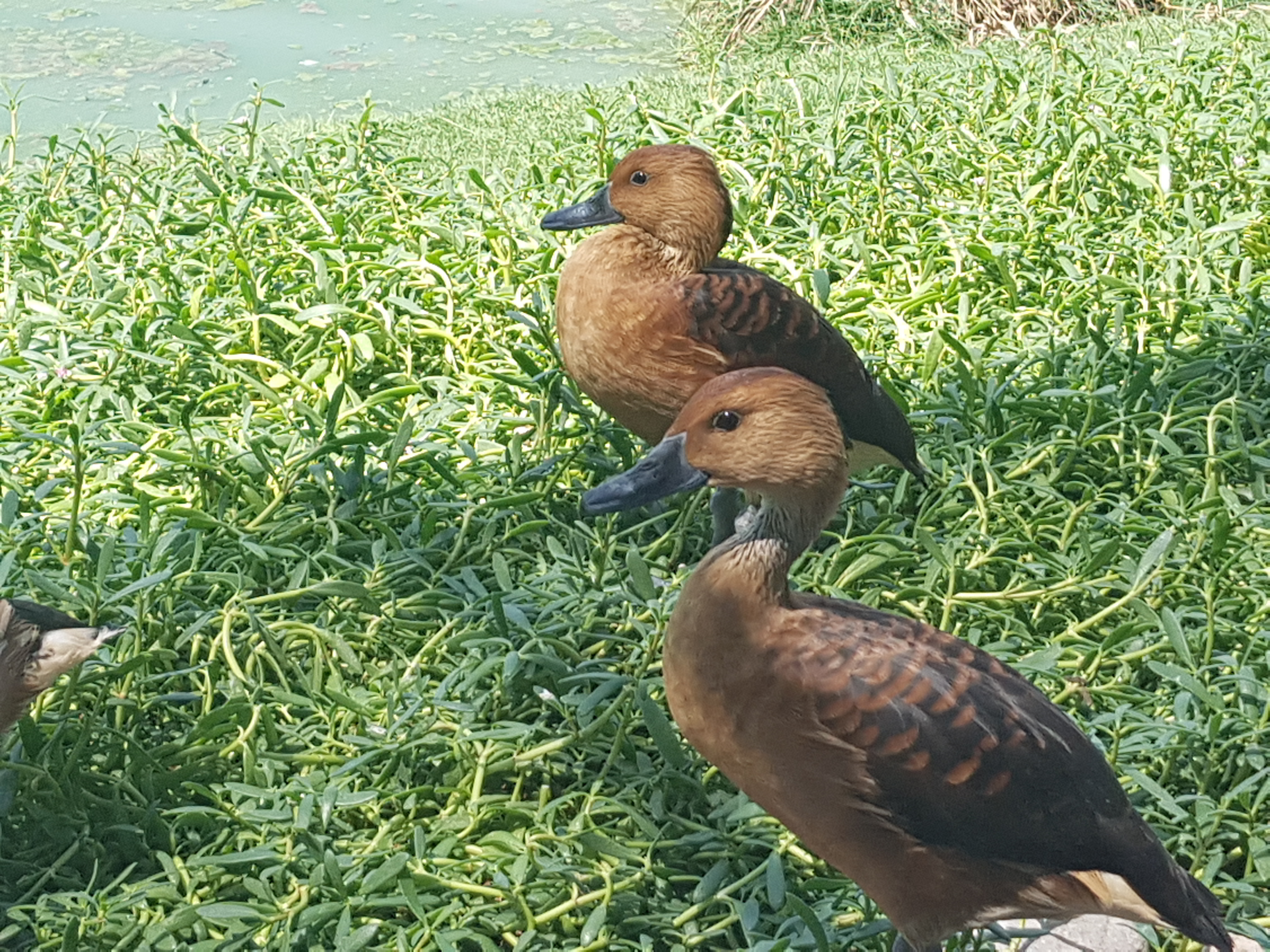
A pair of fulvous whistling ducks (Dendrocygna bicolor) at Wasit Wetland Centre

Wasit Wetland Centre is a conservation area in Sharjah, United Arab Emirates. It preserves an area of a type of wetland (sabkha or salt plain) once common along the western coastal plains of the UAE and consists of a visitor centre with viewing points to both captive and wild birds, as well as extensive areas of dunes, mud flats, salty lagoons and freshwater pools.

Located in the northern Sharjah suburb of Wasit, the centre runs along the Sharjah/Ajman border. The centre comprises 86 hectares (210 acres) of protected habitat and has been designated as a Ramsar site since 2019.

The centre, which was opened in 2015 by the ruler of Sharjah, Dr. Sultan bin Muhammad Al Qasimi, is operated by the Environment and Protected Areas Authority of Sharjah Government and conducts golf-buggy tours around the extensive preservation area, which features a number of hides or observation points. An active educational program is maintained, encouraging visits from local schools. The centre also offers an on-site café, a souvenir store and interactive educational games for children. At the core of the visitor centre is a long, soundproofed gallery which allows visitors to view the birds without disturbing them.

== Biodiversity and environmental education ==
The facility's goal is to educate and inform visitors about the unique wetland environment while encouraging its preservation. In addition to viewing areas, the centre has documentation and displays about the wetlands and houses lecture halls and offices.

The Wetland Centre provides local fauna and migrant birds a safe place to reproduce. Up to 350 species of bird live in or are migratory visitors to the area, and some 60 species of birds are housed permanently in the visitor centre. These include a number of rare birds, including northern bald ibis, glossy ibis, grey heron, marbled duck (a threatened species), purple swamphen, pink-backed pelican and greater flamingo.

== Minimally invasive ==
Designed by X-Architects of Dubai in 2012, and completed in 2015, the building integrates into the site's topography to blend into its environment with minimal visual impact. When visitors enter the building, they go underground and into a linear, transparent gallery to view birds in their natural habitat. There are also eight bird observation structures along the wetland path so visitors can observe birds and other wildlife from within the environment.

In 2019, the Wasit Wetland Centre received the Aga Khan Award for Architecture. It was one of the first projects in the UAE to be shortlisted for the award, along with Concrete in Alserkal Avenue and Al Mureijah Art Spaces at the Sharjah Art Foundation. A common theme shared by the three projects is education.

This project won the Aga Khan Award for Architecture due to its contribution to the betterment of the urban environment. It transformed close to 20 acres of a former wasteland into a pleasant place for visitors to enjoy Nature while simultaneously recovering the native ecosystem. Nowadays it harbours over 350 species of local and migratory birds.

== Transforming wetlands ==
The site of the Wasit Wetland Centre was once a garbage dump, so the centre’s establishment literally turned a wasteland into a wetland. It is part of a larger project to rehabilitate coastal wetlands that began in 2010. The centre is dedicated to environmental education, helping visitors understand biodiversity and their environment while providing a "green lung" for Sharjah residents.
