= Purple swamphen =

The purple swamphen has been split into the following species:

- Western swamphen, Porphyrio porphyrio, southwest Europe and northwest Africa
- African swamphen, Porphyrio madagascariensis, sub-Saharan continental Africa and Madagascar
- Grey-headed swamphen, Porphyrio poliocephalus, Middle East, through the Indian subcontinent to southern China and northern Thailand
- Black-backed swamphen, Porphyrio indicus, southeast Asia to Sulawesi
- Philippine swamphen, Porphyrio pulverulentus, Philippine islands
- Australasian swamphen, Porphyrio melanotus, Australia, New Zealand, and Oceania

== See also ==
- Swamphen, the genus Porphyrio
- Purple gallinule, Porphyrio martinica, found in the Americas
