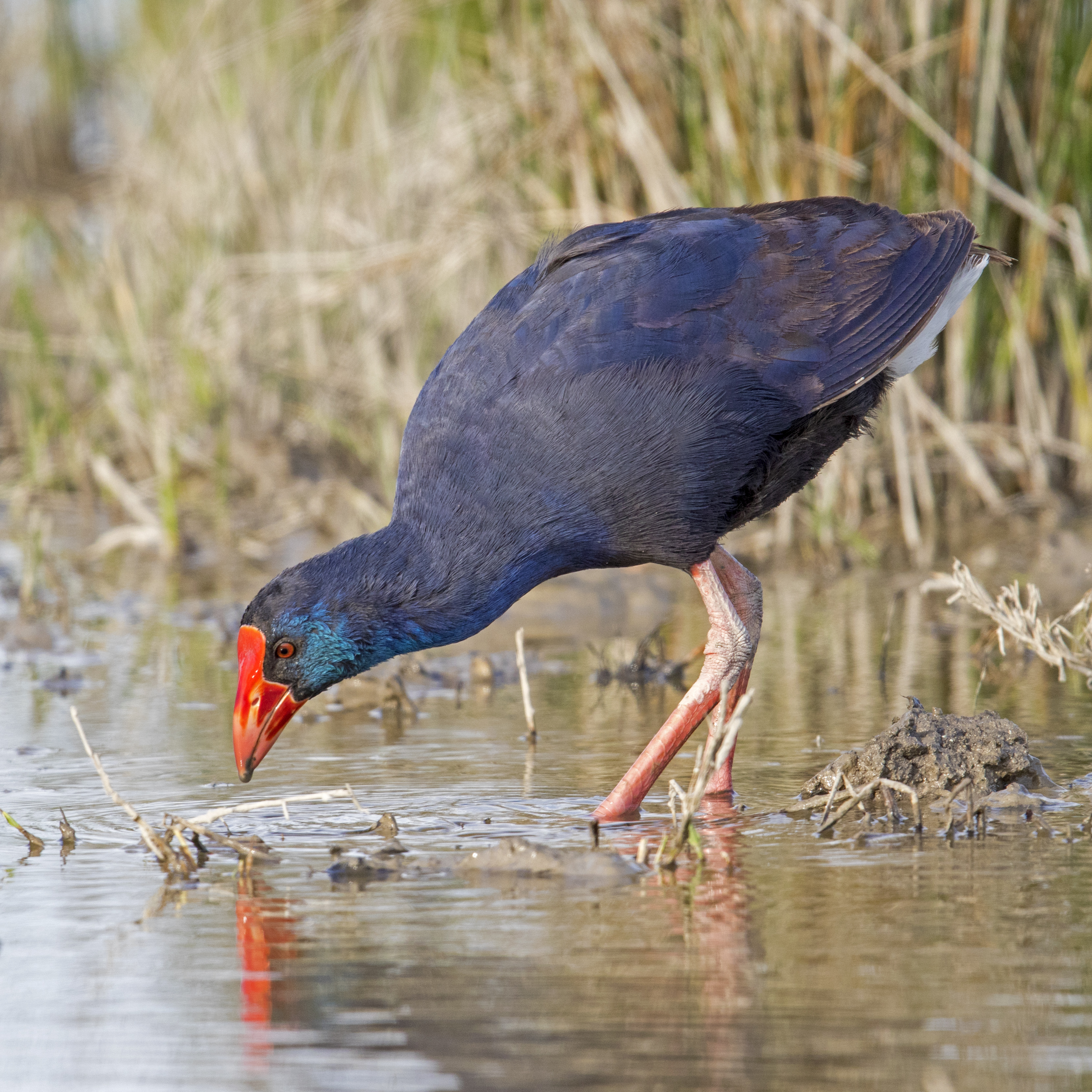
- Western swamphen Porphyrio porphyrio in Mallorca, Spain

Scientific classification
- Kingdom: Animalia
- Phylum: Chordata
- Class: Aves
- Order: Gruiformes
- Family: Rallidae
- Genus: Porphyrio; Brisson, 1760

Type species
- Porphyrio porphyrio Linnaeus, 1758

Species
- See text

Synonyms
- Notornis; Porphyrula

= Swamphen =

Swamphen Temporal range: Middle Miocene-Present 15–0 Ma

Genus of birds

Porphyrio, also known as swamphens or swamp hens, is a genus of semi-aquatic birds in the rail family Rallidae. It includes some smaller species of gallinules which are sometimes separated as the genus Porphyrula or united with the gallinules proper (or "moorhens") in the genus Gallinula. The Porphyrio gallinules are distributed in the warmer regions of the world. The group probably originated in Africa in the Middle Miocene, before spreading across the world in waves from the Late Miocene to the Pleistocene.

The genus Porphyrio was introduced by the French zoologist Mathurin Jacques Brisson in 1760 with the western swamphen (Porphyrio porphyrio) as the type species. The genus name Porphyrio is the Latin name for "swamphen".

== Species ==
The genus contains 10 extant species and two that have become extinct in historical times:

=== Extant species ===
- Purple swamphen complex
  - Western swamphen, Porphyrio porphyrio
  - African swamphen, Porphyrio madagascariensis
  - Grey-headed swamphen, Porphyrio poliocephalus
  - Black-backed swamphen, Porphyrio indicus
  - Philippine swamphen, Porphyrio pulverulentus
  - Australasian swamphen or pūkeko, Porphyrio melanotus
- South Island takahē, Porphyrio hochstetteri
- Allen's gallinule or lesser gallinule, Porphyrio alleni (formerly Porphyrula alleni)
- American purple gallinule, Porphyrio martinica (formerly Porphyrula martinica)
- Azure gallinule, Porphyrio flavirostris

=== Extinct species ===
- White swamphen or Lord Howe swamphen Porphyrio albus (early 19th century)
- Réunion swamphen or oiseau bleu, Porphyrio coerulescens (18th century, hypothetical species)
- Marquesas swamphen, Porphyrio paepae (prehistoric or c. 1900)
- North Island takahē or moho, Porphyrio mantelli (prehistoric or the 1890s)
- New Caledonian swamphen, Porphyrio kukwiedei (prehistoric or more recent)
- Huahine swamphen, Porphyrio mcnabi (prehistoric)
- Porphyrio claytongreenei (prehistoric)
- Buka swamphen, Porphyrio sp. (prehistoric)
- New Ireland swamphen, Porphyrio sp. (prehistoric)
- Norfolk Island swamphen, Porphyrio sp. (prehistoric)
- Rota swamphen, Porphyrio sp. (prehistoric)
- Mangaia swamphen/woodhen, ?Porphyrio sp. (prehistoric) - would belong into Porphyrula, Gallinula or Pareudiastes (the latter genus if it is considered valid)
