= Porphyrio claytongreenei =

Porphyrio claytongreenei Temporal range: Calabrian

Scientific classification
- Kingdom: Animalia
- Phylum: Chordata
- Class: Aves
- Order: Gruiformes
- Family: Rallidae
- Genus: Porphyrio
- Species: †P. claytongreenei

Binomial name
- †Porphyrio claytongreenei Worthy et al., 2026

Extinct species of Porphyrio

Porphyrio claytongreenei is an extinct species of rail in the genus Porphyrio that lived in Zealandia during the Calabrian stage of the Pleistocene Epoch.

== Etymology ==
The specific epithet of Porphyrio claytongreenei references Warren Clayton-Greene, the landowner of the site on which the holotype was found, for his encouragement of scientific research in the caves located on his land and his protection of fossil sites by fencing them off from livestock.
