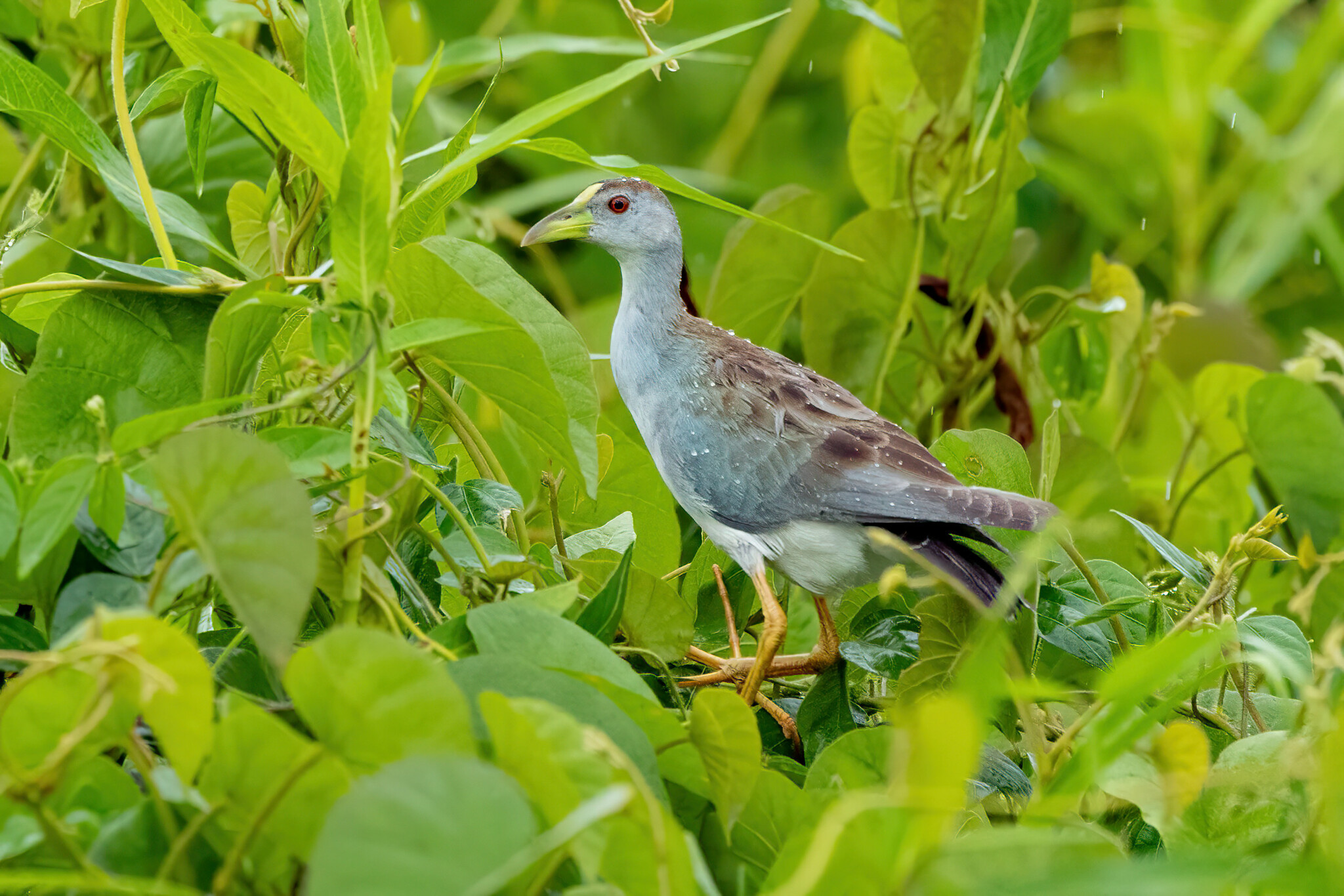
- At Pucallpa, Peru

Conservation status
- Least Concern (IUCN 3.1)

Scientific classification
- Kingdom: Animalia
- Phylum: Chordata
- Class: Aves
- Order: Gruiformes
- Family: Rallidae
- Genus: Porphyrio
- Species: P. flavirostris

Binomial name
- Porphyrio flavirostris (Gmelin, JF, 1789)

Synonyms
- Porphyrula flavirostris

= Azure gallinule =

Species of bird

The azure gallinule (Porphyrio flavirostris) is a species of bird in subfamily Rallinae of family Rallidae, the rails, gallinules, and coots. It is found in Argentina, Bolivia, Brazil, Colombia, Ecuador, French Guiana, Guyana, Paraguay, Peru, Suriname, Trinidad and Tobago, and Venezuela.

== Taxonomy and systematics ==
The azure gallinule was formally described in 1789 by the German naturalist Johann Friedrich Gmelin in his revised and expanded edition of Carl Linnaeus's Systema Naturae. He placed it with the coots in the genus Fulica and coined the binomial name Fulica flavirostris. Gmelin based his description on "La Favorite de Cayenne" that had been described and illustrated in 1781 by the French polymath Georges-Louis Leclerc, Comte de Buffon. The azure gallinule is now placed in the genus Porphyrio that was introduced by the French zoologist Mathurin Jacques Brisson in 1760. The genus name Porphyrio is the Latin word for "swamphen" (from the Ancient Greek πορφυριος/porphurios meaning "purple-clad"). The specific epithet flavirostris combines the Latin flavus meaning "yellow" and -rostris meaning "billed".

The azure gallinule is monotypic: No subspecies are recognized.

== Description ==
The azure gallinule is 23 to 26 cm (9.1 to 10 in) long. Males weigh 92 to 111 g (3.2 to 3.9 oz) and females 92 to 107 g (3.2 to 3.8 oz). It is the smallest member of its genus and has quite different plumage from the others. The sexes are alike. Adults have a pale greenish yellow bill and frontal shield and yellow legs and feet. They have a pale brownish olive crown, hindneck, and back. Their upperwing coverts are azure to greenish blue, their flight feathers gray-blue, and the uppertail coverts and tail brownish olive to black. Their face, sides of the neck, and breast are pale blue-gray and the rest of their underparts white. Immature birds have browner upperparts than adults with a buffy face, neck, and breast; their frontal shield is green and their legs and feet yellowish orange.

== Distribution and habitat ==
The azure gallinule is found in Trinidad and Tobago; from Venezuela south through Colombia and Ecuador into northern Peru; from Venezuela east through the Guianas into Brazil; in Amazonian Brazil, Peru, Bolivia, Paraguay and far northern Argentina; and in eastern Brazil's states of Minas Gerais and Rio de Janeiro. It has also occurred as a vagrant in Uruguay. It primarily inhabits freshwater marshes with fairly deep water and much marsh grass and other vegetation. It also occurs in rice paddies, wet savanna, the margins of swampy streams and rivers, and permanent and seasonal ponds. Though it often shares habitat with the purple gallinule (P. martinica) it prefers areas with shorter vegetation and no bushes. In elevation it typically is found below 500 m (1,600 ft) but has been recorded as high as 2,600 m (8,500 ft) in the Colombian Andes.

== Behavior ==
=== Movement ===
The azure gallinule makes seasonal movements in most of its range; many movements appear to follow the local wet season. Most of the records in the far north are between April and August and that population moves south into southern Amazonia following that period. The species is present in the upper Amazon basin only between January and July. It appears to be resident in southern Colombia and Ecuador, though it does not breed in northern Colombia. It also is present in Peru only outside the breeding season.

=== Feeding ===
The azure gallinule's diet has not been fully defined but is known to include grass seeds, several kinds of insects, and spiders. It forages both in cover and in the open on floating vegetation, and seldom swims. It climbs on grass stalks, bending them to reach the seeds.

=== Breeding ===
The azure gallinule's breeding season varies geographically. For example, it nests between May and August in Suriname and in Ecuador probably between June and September. It is monogamous and is believed to be territorial in the breeding season. It conceals its nest of dead leaves and rushes in marsh vegetation. Both sexes incubate the clutch of four or five eggs but the incubation period is not known.

=== Vocalization ===
The azure gallinule is usually quiet but sometimes makes "a short trill".

== Status ==
The IUCN has assessed the azure gallinule as being of Least Concern. It has a very large range but its population size and trend are not known. No immediate threats have been identified. Its occurrence varies from uncommon to fairly common.
