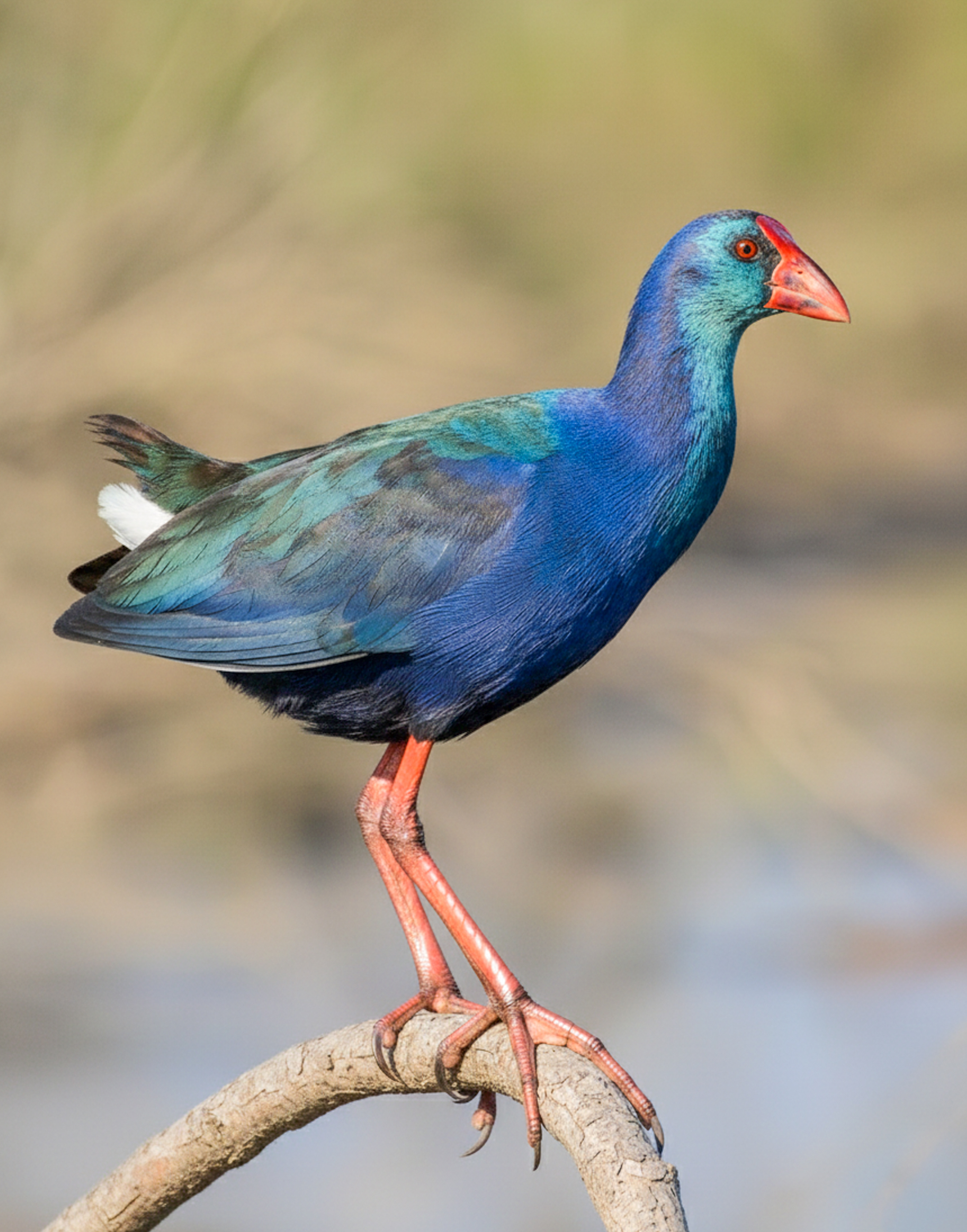
- Individual in Wadi El Rayan, Faiyum, Egypt

Scientific classification
- Kingdom: Animalia
- Phylum: Chordata
- Class: Aves
- Order: Gruiformes
- Family: Rallidae
- Genus: Porphyrio
- Species: P. madagascariensis

Binomial name
- Porphyrio madagascariensis (Latham, 1801)

Synonyms
- Porphyrio porphyrio madagascariensis

= African swamphen =

Species of bird

The African swamphen (Porphyrio madagascariensis) is a species of swamphen occurring in Egypt, Sub-Saharan Africa and Madagascar. It used to be considered a subspecies of the western swamphen, which it resembles, but with bronze green or green-blue back and scapulars. It also resembles the grey-headed swamphen of Asia, sharing the greenish back with it, but lacking the paler grey head of that species.

The African Swamphen is a mainly sedentary species that can be found in sub-Saharan Africa, including southern Africa, where it is sometimes locally common, and also along the Nile north to the Nile Delta in Egypt. It is found in northern and eastern Botswana, part of Namibia, Zimbabwe, South Africa and the coast of Mozambique. In South Africa it is absent from the Northern Cape and the interior of the Eastern Cape.

It has occurred as a vagrant in Israel with a record from Eilat in October 2015.

The African swamphen has a preference for freshwater or brackish ponds, slow flowing rivers, especially those flanked by reeds (Phragmites) and sedges, marshes, swamps, it also occurs on seasonally flooded wetlands.

The population is believed to be decreasing due to local disturbance and loss of habitat although it is not considered to be threatened.

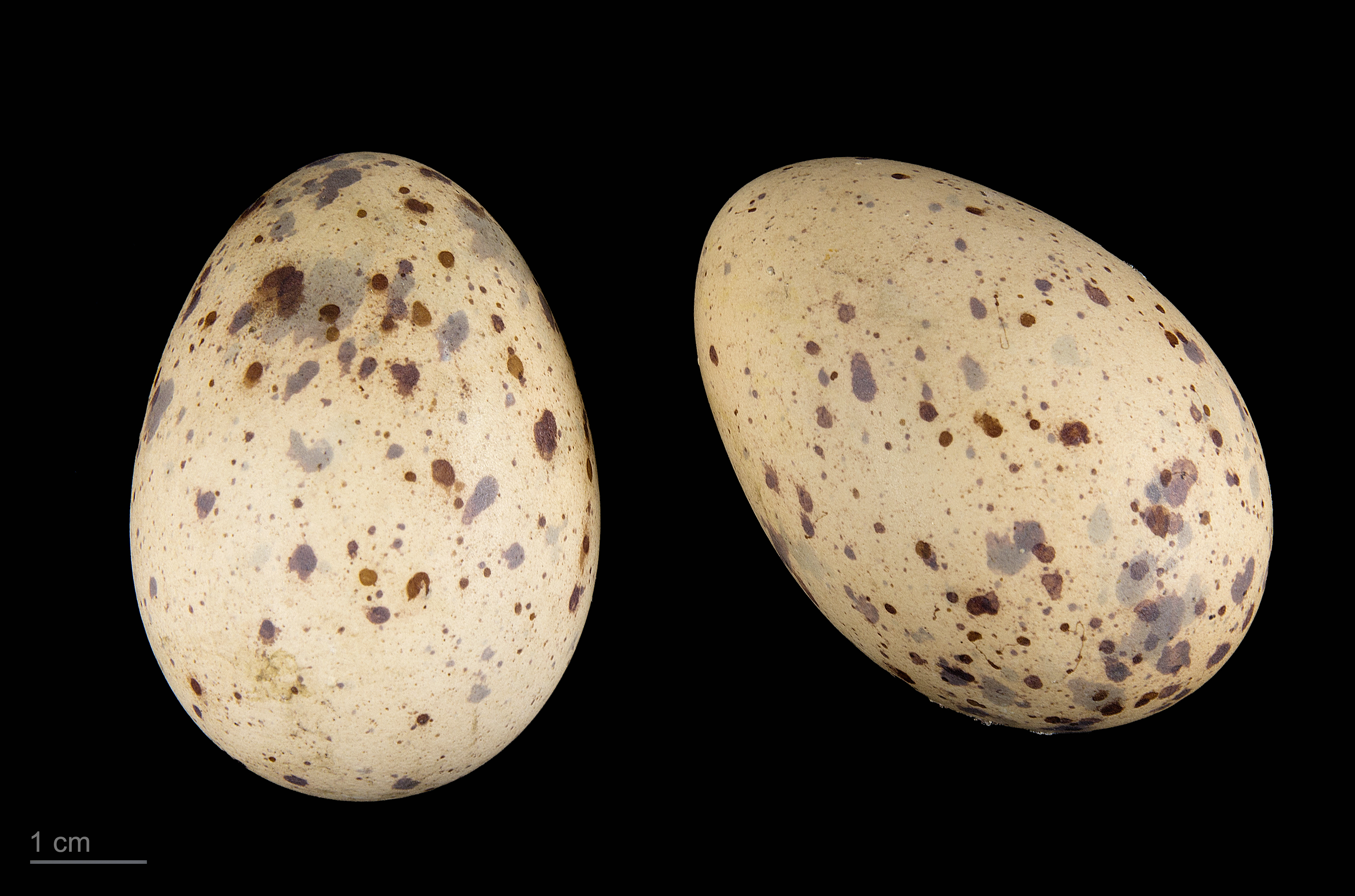
MHNT

in Faiyum, Egypyt
