= George Dawson Rowley =

English amateur ornithologist

George Dawson Rowley (3 May 1822 – 21 November 1878) was an English amateur ornithologist who published a series called Ornithological Miscellany in which he reprinted notes on bird studies of the time. He studied at Eton and Trinity College and was a friend of John Wolley (1823–1859) along with whom he graduated in 1846. He settled in Brighton and spent considerable time researching the history of the great auk and his ornithological journal included specially chosen works by the leading ornithologists of his time. He translated and published the works of Nikolai Przhevalsky.

== Family ==
George Dawson Rowley was the son of George William Rowley & his wife Jane Catherine née Maine
On 30 October 1849 he married his cousin Caroline Frances Lindsay at Trinity Church, Marylebone, London. They had one son : George Fydell Rowley (1851-1933).
