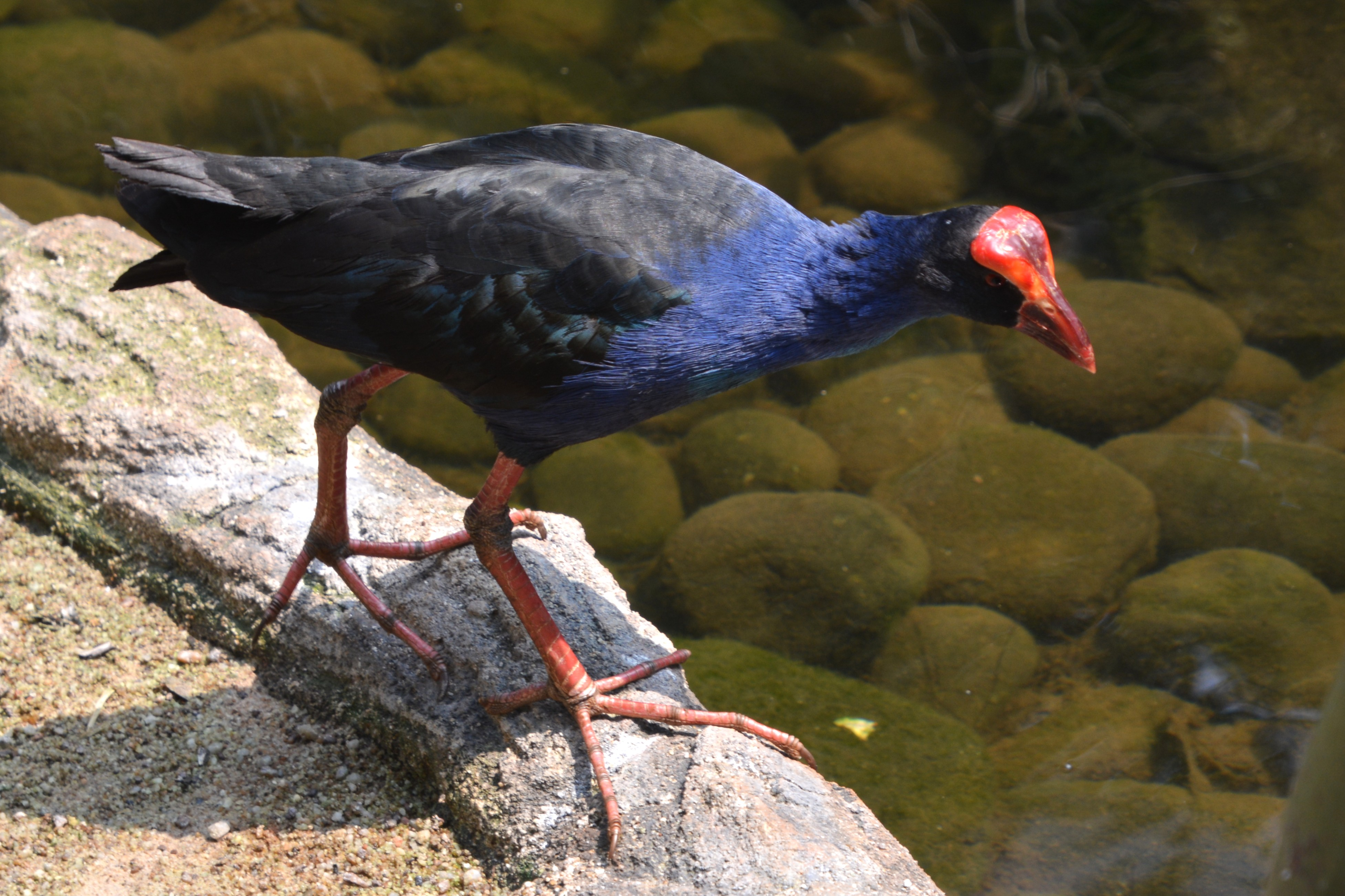

Scientific classification
- Kingdom: Animalia
- Phylum: Chordata
- Class: Aves
- Order: Gruiformes
- Family: Rallidae
- Genus: Porphyrio
- Species: P. indicus

Binomial name
- Porphyrio indicus Horsfield, 1821

Synonyms
- Porphyrio porphyrio indicus

= Black-backed swamphen =

Species of bird

The black-backed swamphen (Porphyrio indicus) is a species of swamphen occurring from southeast Asia to Sulawesi and Borneo. It used to be considered a subspecies of the purple swamphen, which it resembles, but has a large shield, black upperparts, and the side of the head is blackish.

It tends to migrate away from urbanization and other human activity. It lives in wetlands, preferring those with slow-flowing water.
