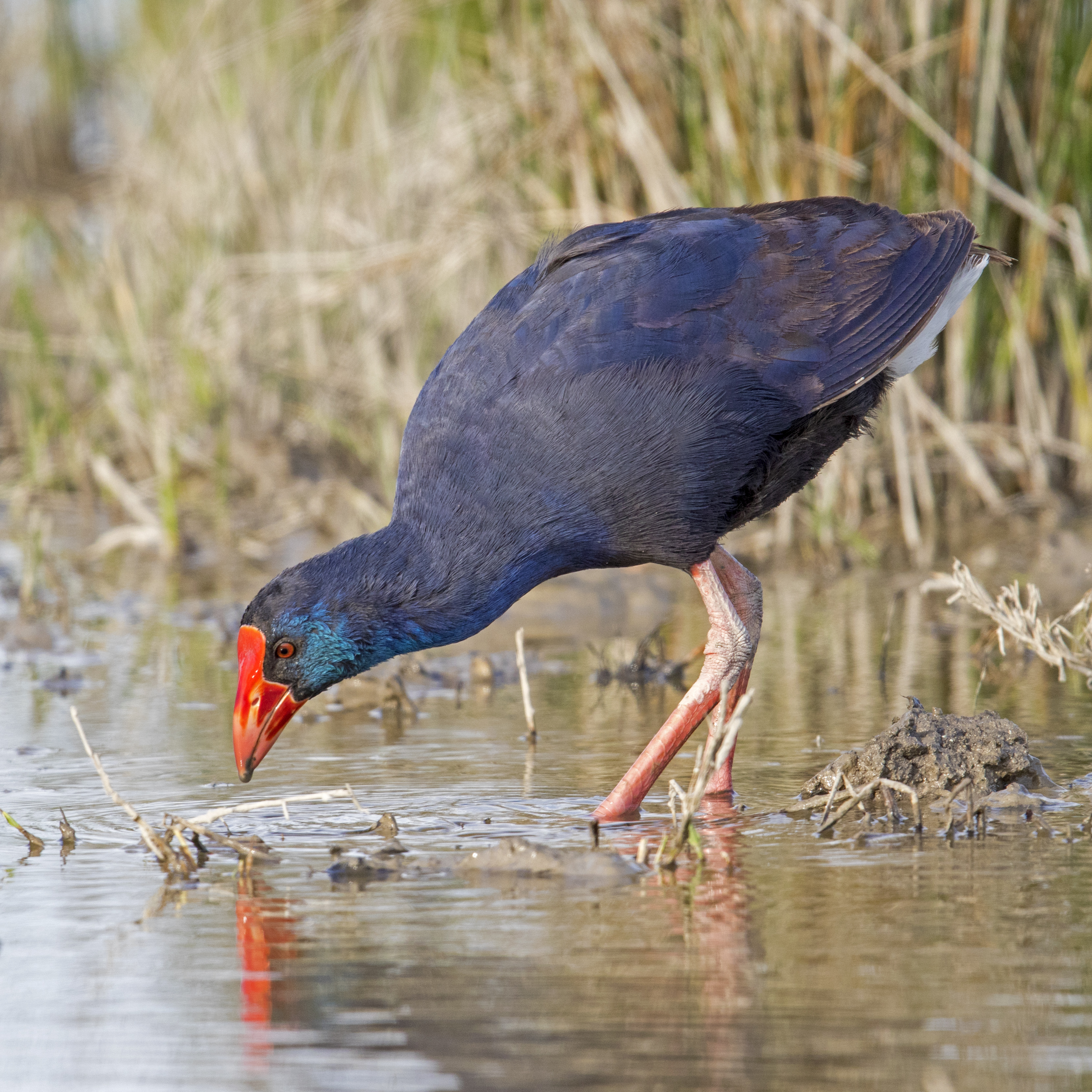
- On the island of Mallorca, Spain

Conservation status
- Least Concern (IUCN 3.1)

Scientific classification
- Kingdom: Animalia
- Phylum: Chordata
- Class: Aves
- Order: Gruiformes
- Family: Rallidae
- Genus: Porphyrio
- Species: P. porphyrio

Binomial name
- Porphyrio porphyrio (Linnaeus, 1758)

Synonyms
- Fulica porphyrio Linnaeus, 1758; Porphyrio coeruleus

= Western swamphen =

Species of waterbird

The western swamphen (Porphyrio porphyrio) is a species of swamphen in the rail family Rallidae, one of the six species of purple swamphen. This chicken-sized bird, with its large feet, bright plumage and red bill and frontal shield is easily recognisable in its native range. It used to be considered the nominate subspecies of the purple swamphen, but is now recognised as a separate species. The western swamphen is found in wetlands in Spain (where the largest population lives), Portugal, southeastern France, Italy (Sardinia and Sicily) and northwestern Africa (Morocco, Algeria and Tunisia).

== Taxonomy ==
The western swamphen was formally described in 1758 by the Swedish naturalist Carl Linnaeus in the tenth edition of his Systema Naturae. He placed it with the coots in the genus Fulica and coined the binomial name Fulica porphyrio. The specific epithet porphyrio is Latin for a swamphen. The word is from Ancient Greek πορφυριον (porphurion) meaning "swamphen" which in turn is from πορφυρα (porphura) meaning "purple". The species had been described in 1678 by the English ornithologist Francis Willughby under that Latin name Porphyrio and English name "purple water-hen". Linnaeas specified the type location as Asia, Africa but this has been restricted to the lands bordering the western Mediterranean. The western swamphen is now one of 12 species placed in the genus Porphyrio that was introduced in 1760 by the French zoologist Mathurin Jacques Brisson.

The western swamphen was formerly considered as the nominate subspecies in the purple swamphen species complex. The complex was split into six species based primarily on a molecular phylogenetic studies published in 1997 and 2015. Following this revision, the species is now considered monotypic, with no subspecies recognised.

== Behaviour ==
The species makes loud, quick, bleating and hooting calls which are hardly bird-like in tone. It is particularly noisy during the breeding season. Despite being clumsy in flight it can fly long distances, and is a good swimmer, especially for a bird without webbed feet.

=== Breeding ===
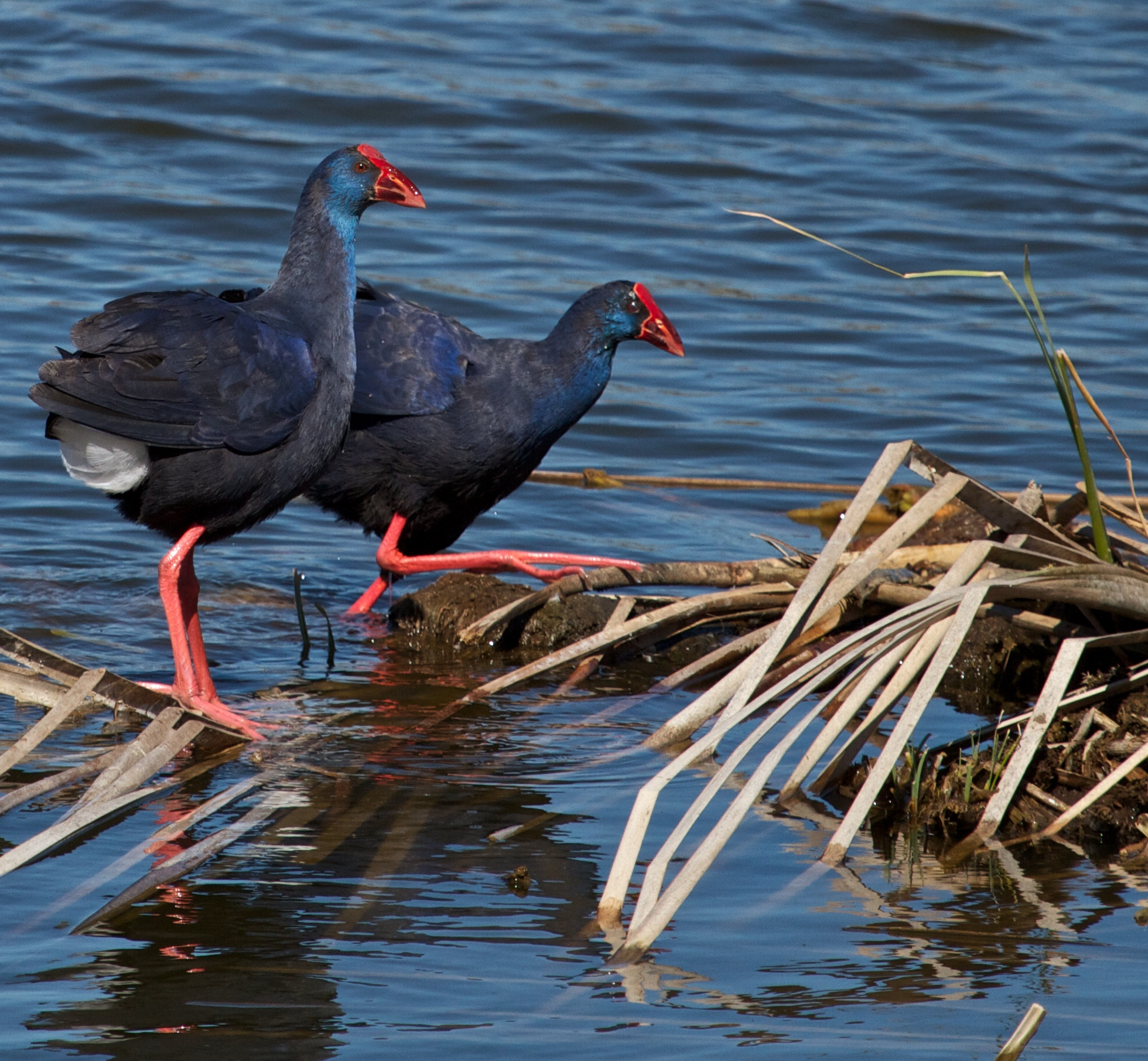
A pair in Portugal

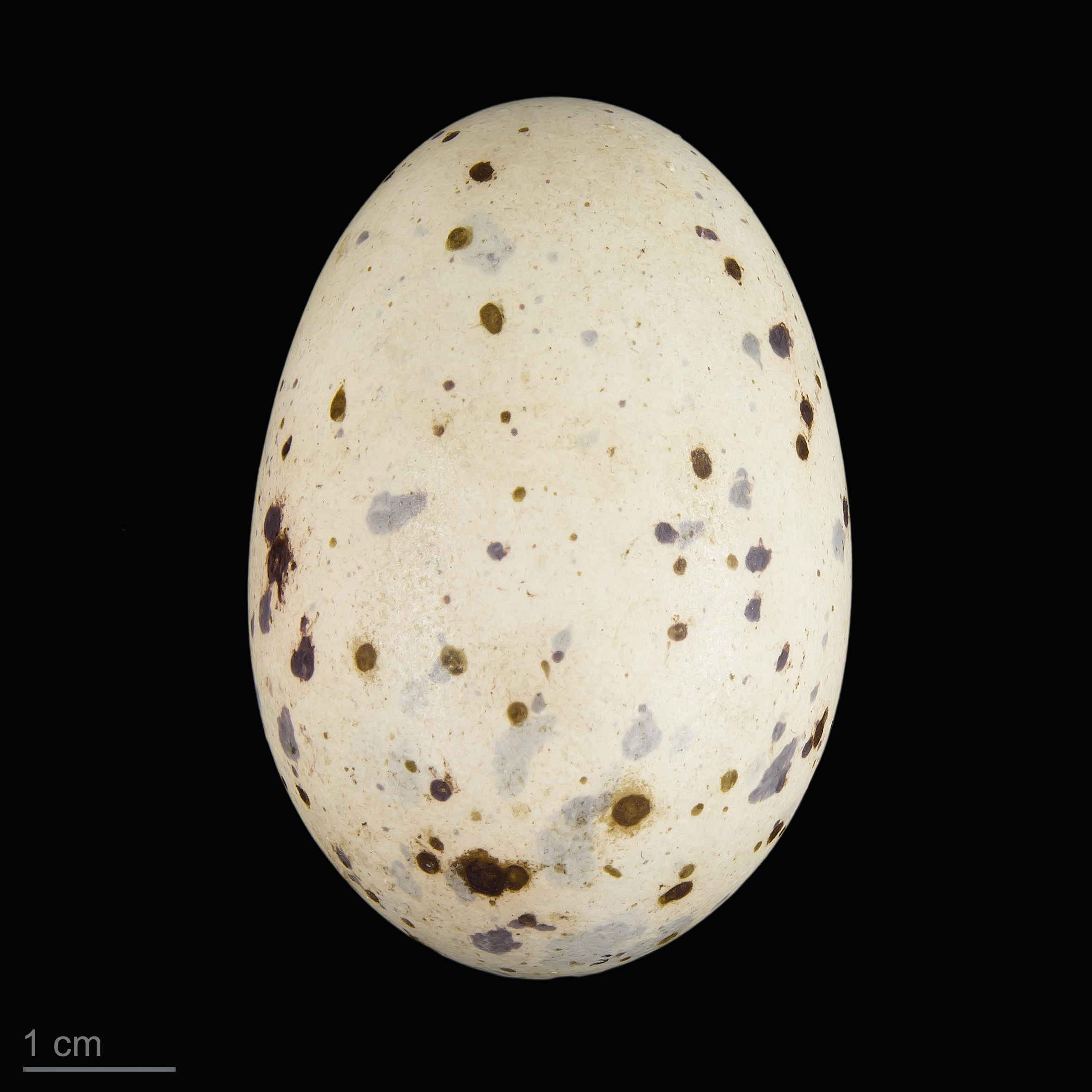
Egg of western swamphen – MHNT

Western swamphens are generally seasonal breeders, correlating with peak rainfall in many places, or summer in more temperate climes. The purple swamphen breeds in warm reed beds. The pattern of social behaviour tends to be monogamy.

Pairs nest in a large pad of interwoven reed flags, etc., on a mass of floating debris or amongst matted reeds slightly above water level in swamps, clumps of rushes in paddocks or long unkempt grass. Each bird can lay 3–6 speckled eggs, pale yellowish stone to reddish buff, blotched and spotted with reddish brown. The incubation period is 23–27 days, and is performed by both sexes. The precocious chicks are feathered with downy black feathers and able to leave the nest soon after hatching, but will often remain in the nest for a few days. Young chicks are fed by their parents (and group members) for between 10–14 days, after which they begin to feed themselves.

=== Food and feeding ===
The western swamphen prefers wet areas with high rainfall, swamps, lake edges and damp pastures. The birds often live in pairs and larger communities. It clambers through the reeds, eating the tender shoots and vegetable-like matter. They have been known to eat eggs, ducklings, small fish and invertebrates such as snails. They have even been known to attack large eels; however, there is no consensus amongst ornithologists if they actually eat eel. They will often use one foot to bring food to their mouth rather than eat it on the ground. Where they are not persecuted, they can become tame and be readily seen in towns and cities.

== Relationship with humans ==
=== Ancient times ===
Swamphens were often kept in captivity in ancient Greece and ancient Rome. The behaviour of the species was described in some detail by Aristotle in History of Animals (4th century BC), and they were also mentioned by Aristophanes (5th century BC), Pliny the Elder (1st century BC), Aelian and Athenaeus (2nd to 3rd century AD). These birds included both western swamphens (originating from the Balearic Islands, among others) and grey-headed swamphens (originating from Turkey), and the two were already distinguished by Pliny the Elder who considered the former superior. They typically were not kept for food, but instead were decorative birds in villas and temples. If raised in captivity, swamphens tend to become quite tame. There are many depictions of the species on Roman mosaics and frescos, typically in a natural or domestic environment, including the famous garden fresco from Pompeii. In early Christianity, it was also frequently depicted, but here symbolising the richness of life and often perched in the tree of life.

=== Status and conservation ===
Today the western swamphen is locally common, with the largest population in Spain. It was formerly listed as "Rare" by the European Union, but has been delisted to "Localised".

The species declined drastically in the first half of the 20th century due to habitat loss and hunting. It was relatively widespread until 1900, but by the 1960s it was seriously threatened and its range in the Iberian Peninsula was limited to a few locations in the Guadalquivir basin. As a result of reintroduction schemes and protection of both the species and its habitat, the western swamphen has since recovered. By the 1990s it was locally common, and by 2000 its range in the Iberian Peninsula was similar to its range in 1900. The center is in Spain where the population increased from 600–900 breeding pairs in 1992 to 3500–4500 breeding pairs in 1999. From Spain it has continued its expansion into southeastern France where small numbers now breed. It remains rare and local in Portugal where there were 49–67 breeding pairs in 2002, but this population is also recovering. It was extirpated from Sicily in 1957, effectively restricting its Italian range to Sardinia where the population was 450–600 breeding pairs in 1999. Beginning in 2000, it was reintroduced to Sicily. A small "purple swamphen" population in central Italy is the result of grey-headed swamphens that escaped from a zoo.

Little is known about the status of the western swamphen in Africa, but northeastern Algeria is considered one of its strongholds in this region.

When protected, western swamphens are able to thrive in human-managed habitats, and in some places they live in paddy fields, resulting in conflicts with farmers as they can be destructive to the rice.
