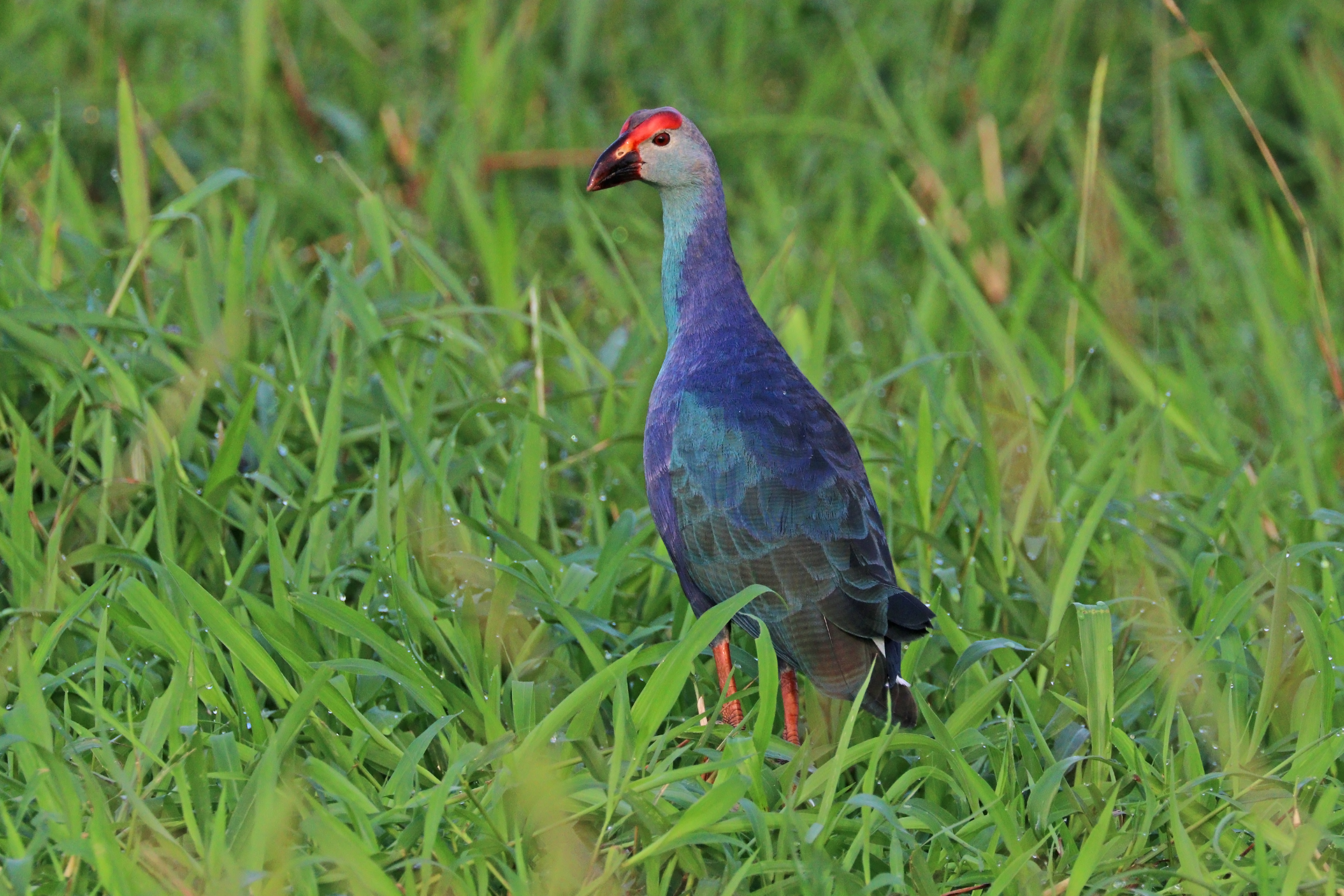
- Male
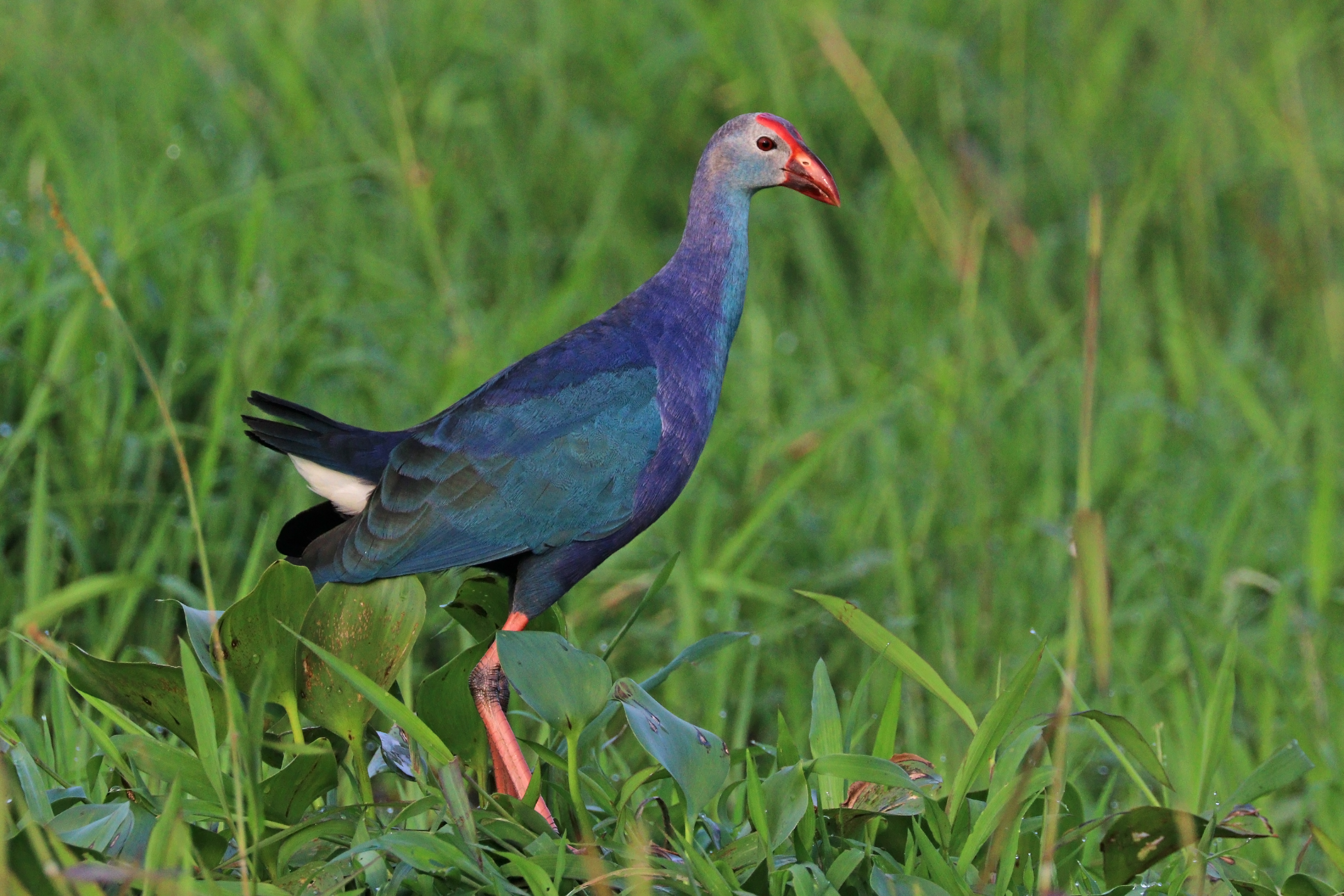
- Female; Both, Vembanad Lake, Kerala

Scientific classification
- Kingdom: Animalia
- Phylum: Chordata
- Class: Aves
- Order: Gruiformes
- Family: Rallidae
- Genus: Porphyrio
- Species: P. poliocephalus

Binomial name
- Porphyrio poliocephalus (Latham, 1801)

Synonyms
- Porphyrio porphyrio poliocephalus

= Grey-headed swamphen =

Species of bird

Grey-headed swamphen in Tanguar Haor, Bangladesh.

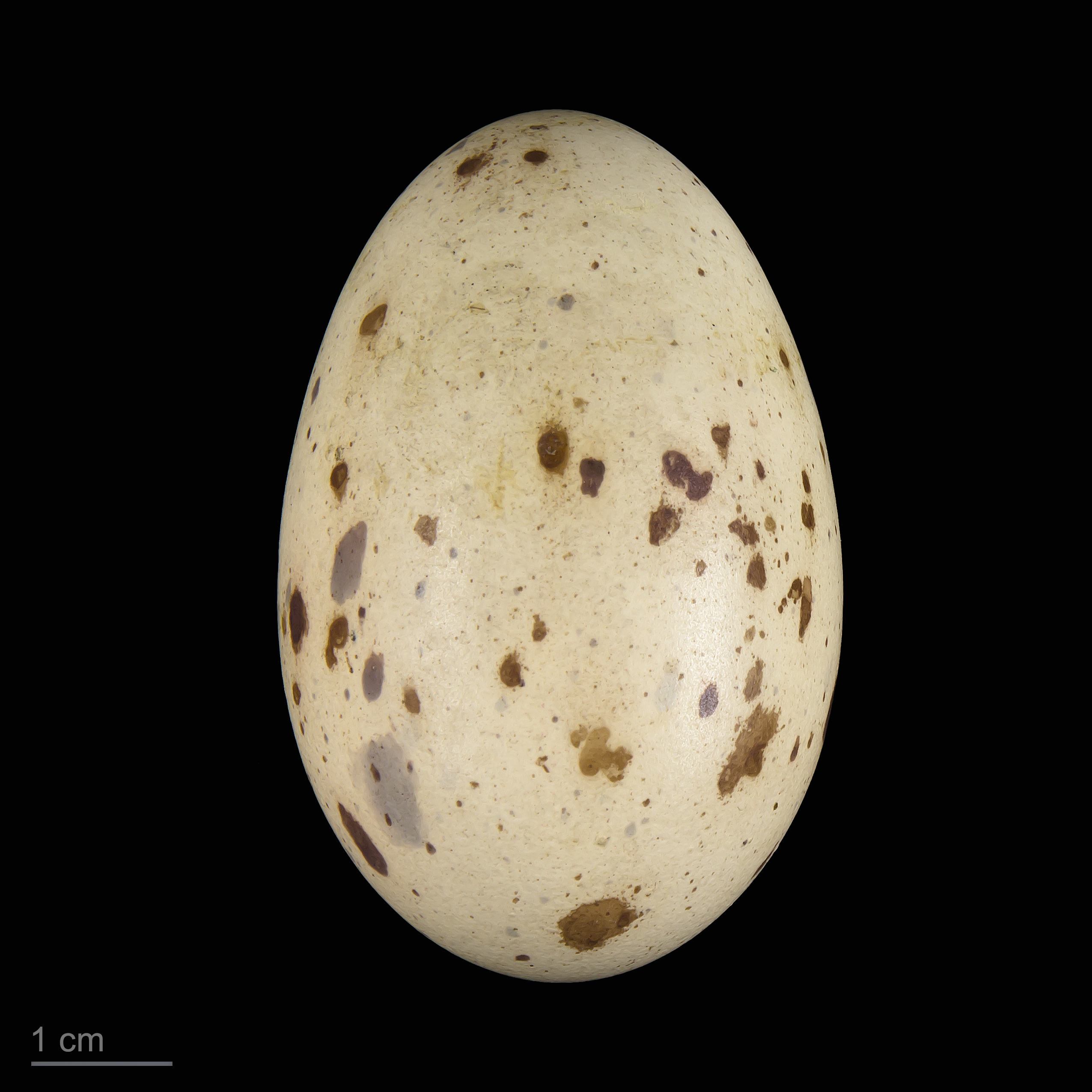
Porphyrio poliocephalus - MHNT

The grey-headed swamphen (Porphyrio poliocephalus) is a species of swamphen occurring from the Middle East and the Indian subcontinent to southern China and northern Thailand. It used to be considered a subspecies of the purple swamphen, but was elevated to full species status in 2015; today the purple swamphen is considered a superspecies and each of its six subspecies groups are designated full species.

It is a large greyish-blue to greyish-purple wetland bird 43 cm long with a pale grey head, and a stout red bill. The wings are greenish, and the legs red. It occurs in marshes and jheels.

The male has an elaborate courtship display, holding water weeds in his bill and bowing to the female with loud chuckles.

== Taxonomy and systematics ==
The grey-headed swamphen is one of 13 species in the genus Porphyrio. It was classified as a subspecies of P. porphyrio until 2015, when the purple swamphen species complex was split into six species, with P. porphyrio being restricted to the western swamphen of the western Mediterranean region.

=== Subspecies ===
Three subspecies are accepted:

- P. p. poliocephalus Latham, 1801. The nominate subspecies. India (including the Andaman and Nicobar Islands) and Sri Lanka to southern China and northern Thailand.
- P. p. seistanicus Zarudny and Härms, 1911. Iraq and southern Iran to Pakistan, Afghanistan, and northwestern India. There is also an introduced population in Florida.
- P. p. caspius Hartert, 1917. Caspian Sea, northwestern Iran, and Turkey.

== As an invasive species ==
The grey-headed swamphen was introduced to North America in the late 1990s due to avicultural escapes in the Pembroke Pines, Florida area. State wildlife biologists attempted to eradicate the birds, but they have multiplied and can now be found in many areas of central and southern Florida. Ornithological authorities consider it likely that the swamphen will become an established part of Florida's avifauna. It was added to the American Birding Association checklist in February 2013.
