= Jessie Buckland =

New Zealand photographer

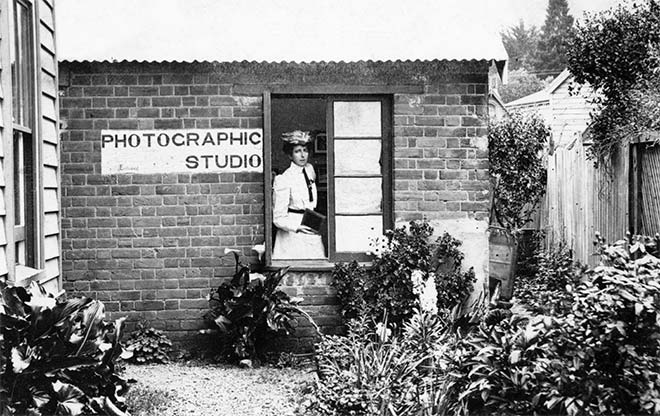
- Born: Jessie Lillian Buckland; 9 May 1878; Tumai, Otago, New Zealand
- Died: 8 June 1939 (aged 61); South Pacific Ocean
- Occupation: Photographer
- Relatives: John Buckland (father); William Thomas Fairburn (grandfather); William Buckland (grandfather); Rachel Buckland (sister); Bessie Hocken (aunt); Thomas Hocken (uncle); Frank Buckland (uncle); Geoffrey Orbell (nephew); Elizabeth Colenso (aunt); William Colenso (uncle)

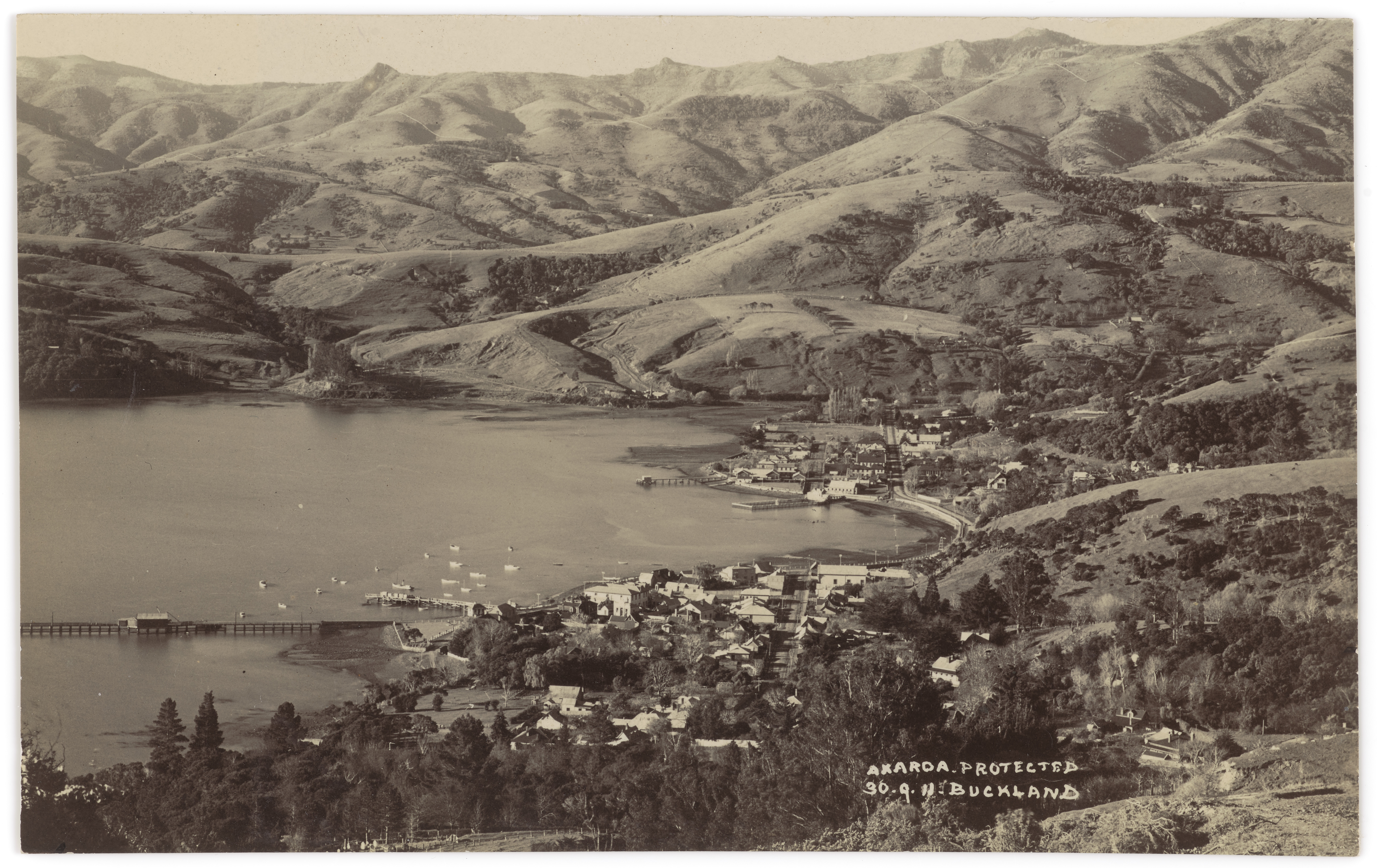
Akaroa, circa 1911, Akaroa, by Jessie Buckland. Purchased 2022. Te Papa (PS.003702)

Jessie Lillian Buckland (9 May 1878 – 8 June 1939) was a New Zealand photographer.

== Life and career ==
Buckland was born in Tumai, Otago, New Zealand on 9 May 1878. Her parents were Caroline Fairburn and John Buckland and she was one of seven children. Her maternal grandfather was William Thomas Fairburn, and her aunt Elizabeth Fairburn was married to William Colenso. Her father was a member of parliament for Waikouaiti between 1884 and 1887 and her uncle, Frank Buckland, was an MP for Auckland electorates at the same time. Her paternal grandfather, William Buckland, was an MP for Auckland electorates from 1865. In 1890, the family moved to Taieri Lake Station where Buckland and several other members of her family took up photography. Her aunt was artist and translator Bessie Hocken, who was a key influence on her photography practice, and her nephew was doctor Geoffrey Orbell.

In 1895, Buckland won second place in a photography competition run by the newspaper The Australasian. She regularly submitted photographs to The Australasian after this competition. While she was a teenager she often used a pseudonym, P. Gay, while she changed it to a capital 'B' as she got older and then when she became a professional photographer she began using her initials and full name.

Buckland worked as a governess at Otago Girls' High School between 1899 and 1902 before she was let go by the school board because of a falling number of students. She then moved with her family to Akaroa. Her work was exhibited in Christchurch at the International Exhibition between 1906 and 1907 and she opened a studio in Akaroa in 1907 where she was well known for producing portraits, photo-postcards and prints for tourists.Her work was recognised by the Wellington's Department of Tourism when they visited Akaroa in 1906 and 1910. Her work was printed in several publications including one by James Cowan and by Blanche Baughan. She also continued to regularly enter competitions and she came first in a competition run by the Auckland Herald Weekly in 1907.

She also worked as a freelance news photographer for more than 30 years. Her work included the opening of Takamatua wharf in 1910, Armistice day celebrations and the opening of the war memorial in 1924. Buckland managed to photograph the Terra Nova as it made an unannounced visit to Akaroa as its first port of call after Robert Falcon Scott's Antarctica expedition in 1912.

She began winding down her business after the death of her older sister in 1930 so that she could look after her elderly mother. Her friend Margaret Mackenzie came to live with them during this period. Her mother died in April 1934 and Buckland and Mackenzie left Akaroa in January 1935 and travelled to the United Kingdom. Buckland was diagnosed with cancer in March 1939 and received treatment in London. She left for New Zealand on the Tamaroa on 8 May but died during the voyage on 8 June. She was buried at sea according to her wishes. The Buckland family albums are held at Hocken Library in Dunedin.

== Sources ==
- Hearnshaw, Vickie (1997). "A Study in Black and White: The Life and Work of Photographer Jessie Buckland". Women's Studies Journal. 13 (1). ProQuest 1306154856.
