= Hocken =

Hocken is a surname. Notable people with the surname include:

- Elizabeth Hocken (1848-1933), artist and translator from New Zealand
- Horatio Clarence Hocken (1857–1937), Canadian politician
- Peter Hocken (1932-2017), Roman Catholic priest
- Sheila Hocken, English writer and canine specialist
- Thomas Hocken (1836–1910), New Zealand collector, bibliographer and researcher

== See also ==
- Hocken Collections
