= John Buckland (New Zealand politician) =

New Zealand politician (1844–1909)

Member of the New Zealand Parliament for Waikouaiti
- In office 22 July 1884 – 26 September 1887
- Preceded by: James Green
- Succeeded by: James Green

Personal details
- Born: John Channing Buckland; 1844 Auckland, New Zealand
- Died: 4 April 1909 (aged 64–65) Akaroa, New Zealand
- Spouse: Caroline Buckland
- Children: Jessie Buckland
- Relatives: William Buckland (father); William Thomas Fairburn (father-in-law); Bessie Hocken (sister); Thomas Hocken (brother-in-law); Frank Buckland (brother); Geoffrey Orbell (grandson); Elizabeth Colenso (sister-in-law); William Colenso (brother-in-law); Alfred Buckland (uncle)
- Profession: Politician, farmer

John Channing Buckland (1844 – 4 April 1909) was a 19th-century Member of Parliament from Otago, New Zealand.

== Early life ==
Buckland was born in Auckland in 1844, the son of William Buckland and Susan (née Channing). Alfred Buckland was his uncle. Frank Buckland and Bessie Buckland were younger siblings; his brother became a politician and his sister (who married the collector and bibliographer Thomas Hocken) a notable artist and translator. Buckland received his education at Dr. Kinder's Grammar School and at St John's College in Auckland. On 17 December 1867, John Buckland married Caroline Fairburn. She was a daughter of William Thomas Fairburn. Her sister Elizabeth Fairburn was a missionary, teacher and bible translator and she was married to the missionary William Colenso.

== Career ==
Buckland fought in the Invasion of the Waikato under Colonel Marmaduke Nixon. Afterwards, he went to England for some years and returned in 1867, when he settled in Ōtāhuhu near Auckland, one of the fencible settlements established during the 1840s. Some years later, he moved to Otago and first lived at Waikouaiti and then at Taieri. He sold his holdings in Taieri in 1899.

New Zealand Parliament
Years	Term	Electorate	Party
1884–1887	9th	Waikouaiti	Independent

Buckland represented the Waikouaiti electorate from 1884 to 1887, when he was defeated in the Waihemo electorate by John McKenzie. He was defeated again in 1890 by McKenzie in the Waitaki electorate. His brother Frank Buckland was a member for south Auckland electorates at the same time.

In 1902, Buckland moved from North Otago to Akaroa, where he bought the Mount Bossu estate sheep farm at Wainui. He served on the Akaroa Council Council for four years but did not stand for re-election in 1908 over failing health.

He died on 4 April 1909 at his homestead, The Glen. He was survived by his wife and seven children, including Jessie Buckland. His grandson, Geoffrey Orbell, was born a few months before his death to his daughter Rachel Orbell.
