= Geoffrey Orbell =

New Zealand doctor and naturalist

Geoffrey Orbell MBE
- Born: Geoffrey Buckland Orbell; 7 October 1908; Pukeuri, New Zealand
- Died: 14 August 2007 (aged 98); Dunedin, New Zealand
- Occupation: Doctor
- Known for: Rediscovery of the takahē
- Relatives: Rachel Buckland (mother)

Geoffrey Buckland Orbell MBE (7 October 1908 – 14 August 2007) was a New Zealand doctor and keen hunter and tramper (bush walker) who was responsible for the rediscovery of the takahē in 1948.

== Biography ==
Orbell grew up on a farm at Pukeuri, near Oamaru, in New Zealand's South Island. His father, Lionel Orbell, was a farmer and his mother, Rachel Buckland, was a watercolour artist. Orbell attended Waitaki Boys High School, Oamaru and Christ's College, Christchurch, before graduating in medicine from the University of Otago, Dunedin. He completed further studies in Melbourne, Australia, and at Moorfields Eye Hospital in London, and practised as an ear, eye, nose and throat specialist in Invercargill.

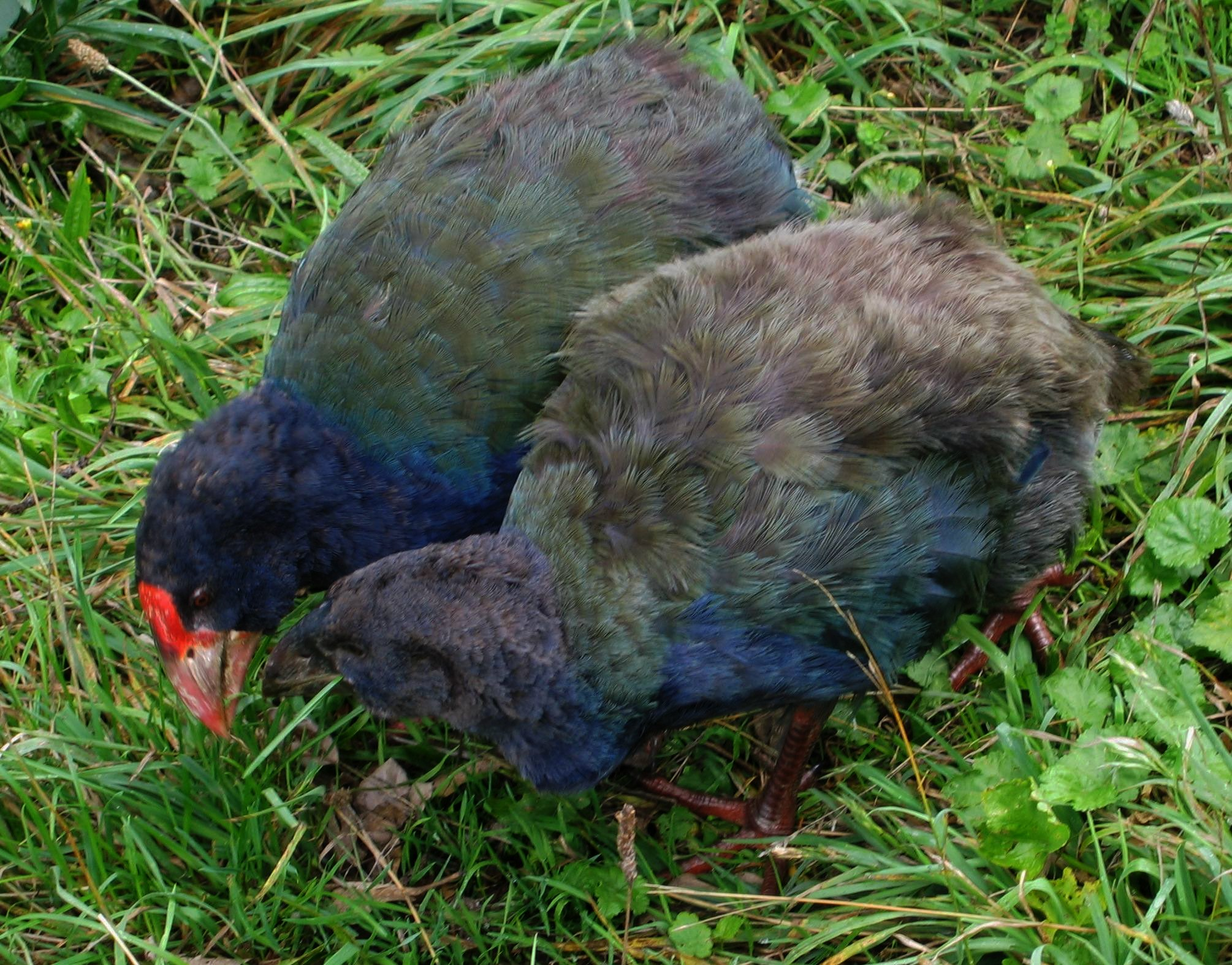
An adult and juvenile takahē

The takahē had been last sighted in 1898 and was widely thought to be extinct but Orbell suspected it might have survived. He had been interested in the bird since childhood and had read widely about it. He was convinced that if it still existed, it might be found in the Murchison Mountains west of Lake Te Anau. In April 1948, Orbell and friends Rex Watson and Neil McCrostie went into the area on a deer hunting trip. Orbell heard bird calls he did not recognise, and found tracks that convinced him the takahē existed. The same group, plus Joan Telfer, returned to the area in November of the same year. While searching, Orbell again discovered a set of unfamiliar footprints and heard a strange bird call. After following the footprints, Orbell rediscovered three of the species on 20 November 1948 in a remote valley. A lake in the valley was named Lake Orbell in his honour.

Orbell was one of the founders of the New Zealand Deerstalkers' Association and was its first president, holding the position from 1938 to 1952. He was elected to the Invercargill City Council in 1941 and was appointed to the inaugural Invercargill Licensing Trust board in 1944. In the 1953 Coronation Honours, he was appointed a Member of the Order of the British Empire, for scientific work. He retired from medical practice at the age of 70, after 46 years in practice, and in later years lived in Mosgiel, near Dunedin. Orbell died on 14 August 2007. He is buried at Invercargill's St John's Cemetery.

== Personal life ==
In 1935 Orbell married Sheila Houston. The couple had four children together. His aunt was photographer Jessie Buckland and his grandfather was politician John Buckland. His great-aunt was artist and translator Elizabeth Hocken.
