= William Buckland (politician) =

New Zealand politician

William Thorne Buckland
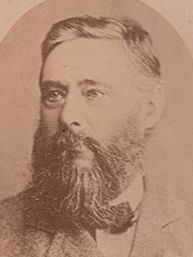
- Portrait of W. T. Buckland

Member of the New Zealand Parliament for Raglan
- In office 19 April 1865 – 27 January 1866
- Preceded by: Charles John Taylor
- Succeeded by: Joseph Newman

Member of the New Zealand Parliament for Franklin
- In office 23 February 1871 – 6 December 1875
- Preceded by: William Turnbull Swan; Theodore Haultain
- Succeeded by: Hugh Lusk; Ebenezer Hamlin

Personal details
- Born: 1819
- Died: 17 January 1876 (aged 56) Remuera, Auckland, New Zealand
- Relations: Frank Buckland (son); John Buckland (son); Elizabeth Hocken (daughter); Alfred Buckland (brother); Thomas Morland Hocken (son-in-law); Jessie Buckland (granddaughter)

William Thorne Buckland (1819 – 17 January 1876) was a 19th-century Member of Parliament in New Zealand.

Buckland was born in 1819 or 1820. His mother was Elizabeth (née Mortimore) and his father was the broker John Buckland; they were from Devon, England. The auctioneer Alfred Buckland was a younger brother.

Buckland arrived in New Zealand in 1841 from South Australia, and was a butcher in Auckland, then a farmer in the Waikato. He married Susan Channing on 13 April 1843 at St Paul's Church in Auckland.

Buckland was appointed to the Auckland Executive Council of the Auckland Province in November 1856 (the source does not state and end date), and was again appointed from February to July 1857. He was elected to the Auckland Provincial Council for the Raglan electorate in November 1861 and served until 1869. From 1869 to 1873, he represented the Franklin electorate. He had no intention of standing for the Provincial Council again but happened to ride past the nomination meeting in Newmarket for the Eden electorate. There was only one nomination thus far for the two available positions, and Buckland was talked into being nominated. As the number of nominations matched the number of available positions, he was declared elected unopposed, and served until his death.

New Zealand Parliament
Years	Term	Electorate	Party
1865–1866	3rd	Raglan	Independent
1871–1875	5th	Franklin	Independent

He represented two South Auckland electorates; first the Raglan electorate from 1865 to 1866, when he retired to go overseas. He then represented the Franklin electorate from 1871 to 1875. He was nominated for the 1876 election and gave a speech at the nomination meeting on 10 January 1876, but withdrew his nomination before the end of the proceedings. The Auckland Star suggested that the sole purpose of his nomination was that he could make a speech in opposition to Sir George Grey. Buckland left for the Waikato immediately afterwards to support Alfred Cox in his candidacy in the Waipa electorate. However, he became ill with symptoms of heat stroke and returned to his home in Remuera.

He died at his home in Remuera, Auckland aged 56 years after that brief illness. He was buried at St Stephen's Cemetery in Parnell. His wife had died in September 1871; she had committed suicide after having become depressed. Their sons Frank and John Buckland were both elected to the parliament in the 1884 election; their daughter Elizabeth Mary married prominent Dunedin doctor and historian Thomas Morland Hocken. Jessie Buckland was his son John's daughter.

== Notes ==
New Zealand Parliament
Preceded by Charles John Taylor	Member of Parliament for Raglan; 1865–1866	Succeeded by Joseph Newman
Preceded by William Turnbull Swan, Theodore Haultain	Member of Parliament for Franklin; 1871–1876; Served alongside: Archibald Clark, Joseph May	Succeeded by Hugh Lusk, Ebenezer Hamlin
