= Murchison Mountains =

Mountains in Fiordland National Park in New Zealand

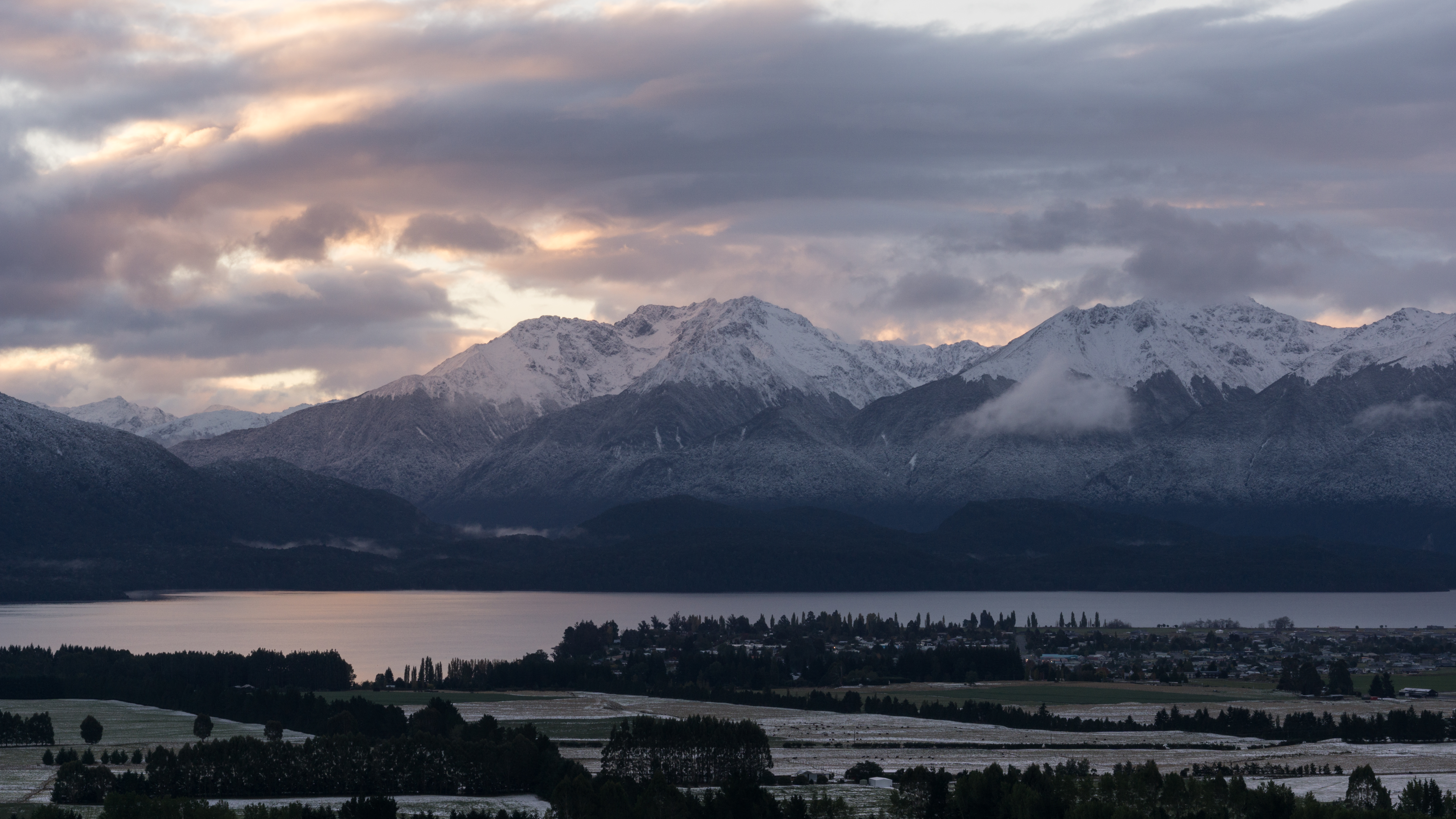
- A view of the Murchison Mountains from Te Anau

Highest point
- Peak: Mount Lyall
- Elevation: 1,892 m (6,207 ft)
- Coordinates: 45.27516°S 167.53659°E

Geography
- Location within New Zealand
- Country: New Zealand
- Range coordinates: 45.20086°S 167.43017°E
- Topo map: GNS Science

Geology
- Mountain type: Mountain Range

The Murchison Mountains (Māori: Te Puhi-a-noa) are a group of mountains in Fiordland National Park in New Zealand. It is the location where the South Island takahē, a type of bird presumed extinct, was rediscovered in 1948. The highest mountain is Mount Lyall at 1,892 metres (6,207 ft).

== Naming ==
The Murchison Mountains are named after Roderick Murchison, one of the founders of the Royal Geographical Society.

== Flora and fauna ==
Native birds recorded in the area include takahē, mohua, whio, kea, New Zealand kākā, kākāriki, New Zealand falcon, weka, rock wren, tomtit, tūī, bellbird, fantail, rifleman, grey warbler, brown creeper, silver-eye, pipit and kiwi.

The 1948 discovery of the takahē, the largest living member of the rail family, happened after unrecognized bird footprints were found, and Geoffrey Orbell, an Invercargill-based physician, led an expedition to find the unknown bird. After this, an area of 500 square kilometres (190 sq mi) was set aside for the conservation of the takahē. Following the reintroduction of takahē to Gouland Downs in Kahurangi National Park, this is one of only two places where wild takahē can be seen. It is the longest running conservation programme in New Zealand.

With the aim of protecting the native bird populations, the New Zealand Department of Conservation started a program in 2002 to control stoats in the area. In 2007, a population increase of stoats in the mountains after a beech and tussock mast seeding led to a halving of the takahē population. The numbers of red deer in the Murchison Mountains steadily grew between 1930 and 1973 but hunting on foot and helicopter reduced the population by 60% between 1973 and 1975. In a 1953 expedition to the Murchison Mountains for the Canterbury Museum, W. R. Philipson discovered a new type of plant from the genus Pachycladon, Pachycladon crenata. A 2007 study by the Ornithological Society of New Zealand reported that the New Zealand rock wren population in the Murchison Mountains had dropped by 44% in the last 20 years compared with a study in 1989.

== Climate ==
Climate data for Murchison Mtns, elevation 1,140 m (3,740 ft), (1991–2020)
Month	Jan	Feb	Mar	Apr	May	Jun	Jul	Aug	Sep	Oct	Nov	Dec	Year
Mean daily maximum °C (°F)	12.8 (55.0)	13.2 (55.8)	11.5 (52.7)	8.4 (47.1)	6.2 (43.2)	4.2 (39.6)	3.0 (37.4)	4.2 (39.6)	5.8 (42.4)	7.4 (45.3)	9.7 (49.5)	11.8 (53.2)	8.2 (46.7)
Daily mean °C (°F)	9.1 (48.4)	9.4 (48.9)	8.0 (46.4)	5.3 (41.5)	3.7 (38.7)	1.7 (35.1)	0.7 (33.3)	1.4 (34.5)	2.7 (36.9)	3.9 (39.0)	5.8 (42.4)	7.9 (46.2)	5.0 (40.9)
Mean daily minimum °C (°F)	5.3 (41.5)	5.6 (42.1)	4.5 (40.1)	2.2 (36.0)	1.1 (34.0)	−0.7 (30.7)	−1.7 (28.9)	−1.4 (29.5)	−0.4 (31.3)	0.4 (32.7)	1.9 (35.4)	4.0 (39.2)	1.7 (35.1)
Average rainfall mm (inches)	306.9 (12.08)	227.1 (8.94)	220.0 (8.66)	298.0 (11.73)	353.1 (13.90)	143.8 (5.66)	245.1 (9.65)	157.5 (6.20)	256.2 (10.09)	274.0 (10.79)	236.2 (9.30)	250.5 (9.86)	2,968.4 (116.86)
Source: NIWA

Climate data for Takahe Valley, elevation 895 m (2,936 ft), (1991–2020)
Month	Jan	Feb	Mar	Apr	May	Jun	Jul	Aug	Sep	Oct	Nov	Dec	Year
Mean daily maximum °C (°F)	14.8 (58.6)	14.9 (58.8)	13.1 (55.6)	9.9 (49.8)	6.4 (43.5)	3.1 (37.6)	2.5 (36.5)	4.9 (40.8)	7.2 (45.0)	9.3 (48.7)	11.4 (52.5)	13.7 (56.7)	9.3 (48.7)
Daily mean °C (°F)	10.0 (50.0)	10.1 (50.2)	8.4 (47.1)	5.8 (42.4)	3.3 (37.9)	0.2 (32.4)	−0.6 (30.9)	1.0 (33.8)	3.2 (37.8)	5.0 (41.0)	6.6 (43.9)	9.0 (48.2)	5.2 (41.3)
Mean daily minimum °C (°F)	5.1 (41.2)	5.3 (41.5)	3.8 (38.8)	1.6 (34.9)	0.1 (32.2)	−2.7 (27.1)	−3.7 (25.3)	−2.9 (26.8)	−0.8 (30.6)	0.6 (33.1)	1.9 (35.4)	4.2 (39.6)	1.0 (33.9)
Source: NIWA
