= Arthur Morrow =

New Zealand soldier and artist (1842–1937)

- Studio portrait of Morrow, published in 1900
- Born: 1842; County Longford, Ireland
- Died: 30 August 1937 (aged 94); Auckland, New Zealand
- Known for: Artist surveyor
- Military career
- Allegiance: New Zealand
- Service years: 1861–1904
- Rank: Lieutenant Colonel
- Unit: Auckland Volunteer Rifles
- Conflicts: New Zealand Wars: Invasion of the Waikato
- Awards: Volunteer Decoration; New Zealand War Medal

Arthur Morrow VD (1842 – 30 August 1937) was a New Zealand artist and soldier, active from the late 19th to early 20th century and best known for his paintings and pencil sketches of military scenes and life in the Auckland region.

Originally from County Longford, Morrow emigrated to New Zealand in 1861. He settled in Auckland and found work as a surveyor, also serving in the militia. He was called up for active service with the Auckland Volunteer Rifles just prior to the invasion of the Waikato in July 1863 and saw action in September during skirmishing at Wairoa to the east of Auckland and at the Battle of Orakau the following year. During this time he made sketches and paintings of military life. He returned to his career as a surveyor at the end of the campaign in the Waikato in late 1864, but continued to serve part-time in the militia for the next several years until his retirement in 1904. He also continued to paint, executing works depicting Auckland scenes and landscapes. He died in 1937 at the age of 94. Many of his artworks are in the collections of the Auckland Art Gallery, the Fletcher Trust, and Heritage New Zealand, the latter using them to decorate Highwic, a house museum in Newmarket.

== Early life ==
Arthur Morrow was born in 1842 in County Longford, Ireland, the son of Hugh Morrow, who worked for the British Board of Ordnance for many years. In his youth, Morrow had intended to join the Royal Marines and had studied to this effect. However, by the time he passed the entrance examination, he was too old to join as a junior officer. In 1861, he migrated with his father and family to New Zealand, where they settled in Auckland. Morrow found work in the civil service, initially in the Waste Lands Department, carrying out surveying duties.

== Invasion of the Waikato ==
Soon after his arrival in Auckland, Morrow joined the local militia and served as a private. During the tensions prior to the invasion of the Waikato in July 1863, he became a member of the Auckland Rifle Volunteers, gaining a commission as an ensign. Once the invasion commenced in July 1863, his unit was attached to various British Army regiments as it protected the hills to the southeast of Auckland. He was involved in engagements in Wairoa, near modern day Clevedon, in mid-September; his company was manning the Galloway Redoubt when it defended an attack by Kingite forces on 15 September. A few days later a nearby settlement was attacked. Morrow and his men, accompanied by elements of the British 18th Regiment of Foot, sallied from the redoubt to beat off the attack.

Later in the campaign, Morrow was attached to the 70th Regiment of Foot as it moved south into the Waikato and was present at the Battle of Orakau in late March 1864. After the end of hostilities in the Waikato later in the year, Morrow returned to civilian life. During the course of his service with the Auckland Rifle Volunteers, he became friends with the artist Charles Heaphy, also a serving member of the unit, and made sketches and paintings of military life.

== Later life ==
Now a civilian, Morrow resumed his surveying career with the Waste Lands Department, working in the Auckland district. He was latterly employed by the Department of Lands and Survey. In June 1877 he married Mariamne Harris Buckland, the daughter of the well known businessman Alfred Buckland, at St Sepulchre's Church on Symonds Street in Auckland. Morrow continued his interest in art, making numerous sketches and paintings of the Auckland area. These are noted for their accuracy in depicting the local landscapes, and became an important record of life in Auckland in the late 1800s to early 1900s. He exhibited with the Auckland Society of Arts in 1904.

Morrow also continued to serve part-time in the militia, which became officially known as the Volunteer Force. A noted marksman, he received several awards for his rifle shooting. By 1874, he was a captain and commanding a company in the Auckland Rifle Volunteers. He eventually became a staff officer in the Auckland Military District. In his later military career he was deputy-assistant adjutant-general. He was also an inventor and was granted a patent, entitled "Improvements in projectiles", in 1893 for munitions-related technology. He retired in 1904 as a lieutenant colonel and a recipient of the Volunteer Decoration for his extensive service.

Morrow's later years were spent residing at Bucklands Beach but he died aged 94 at his home in Epson on 30 August 1937. His medals, which include the Volunteer Decoration, the New Zealand War Medal, and Long Service Medal are in the collection of the Auckland War Memorial Museum.

Morrow's Musick Point, painted in 1905, is in the collection of the Auckland Art Gallery

Some of Morrow's works are in the collection of the Auckland Art Gallery, and at least one painting, of a military encampment, is owned by the Fletcher Trust. Examples of his work were included in a 1962 touring exhibition, "The Wars of New Zealand", along paintings by Heaphy, Colonel Cyprian Bridge, Major Gustavus von Tempsky and Major General Horatio Robley, among others. Several other examples are in the possession of Heritage New Zealand, having been donated by his descendants to help furnish Highwic, formerly owned by Alfred Buckland, his father-in-law, and now a house museum. Morrow Avenue, in Bucklands Beach, is named for his wife.
