= Henry Chamberlin =

New Zealand politician

The Honourable Henry Chamberlin

Member of the New Zealand Legislative Council
- In office 8 February 1869 – 12 April 1888

Personal details
- Born: 31 July 1825 Narborough, Norfolk, England
- Died: 12 April 1888 (aged 62) Drury, New Zealand
- Resting place: St Thomas' Cemetery, Kohimarama
- Spouse: Elizabeth Catherine Heard (m. 1859–1888)
- Children: one daughter
- Occupation: land holder politician
- Other name: Henry Chamberlain

Henry Chamberlin (31 July 1825 – 12 April 1888), in many sources referred to as Chamberlain, was a member of the New Zealand Legislative Council. He came to New Zealand in his late 20s with a younger brother and a lot of capital, which he invested in land south and west of Auckland. After a failed attempt to win election to the House of Representatives in 1867, he was called to the Legislative Council in early 1869. He remained a member until his accidental drowning in 1888.

== Early life and family ==
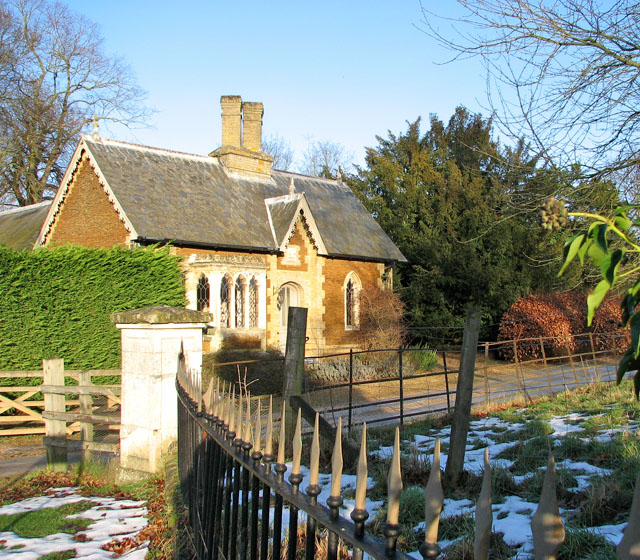
The gatehouse of Narborough Hall

Chamberlin was born at The Close, Norwich in 1825. His father owned Narborough Hall.

== Life in New Zealand ==
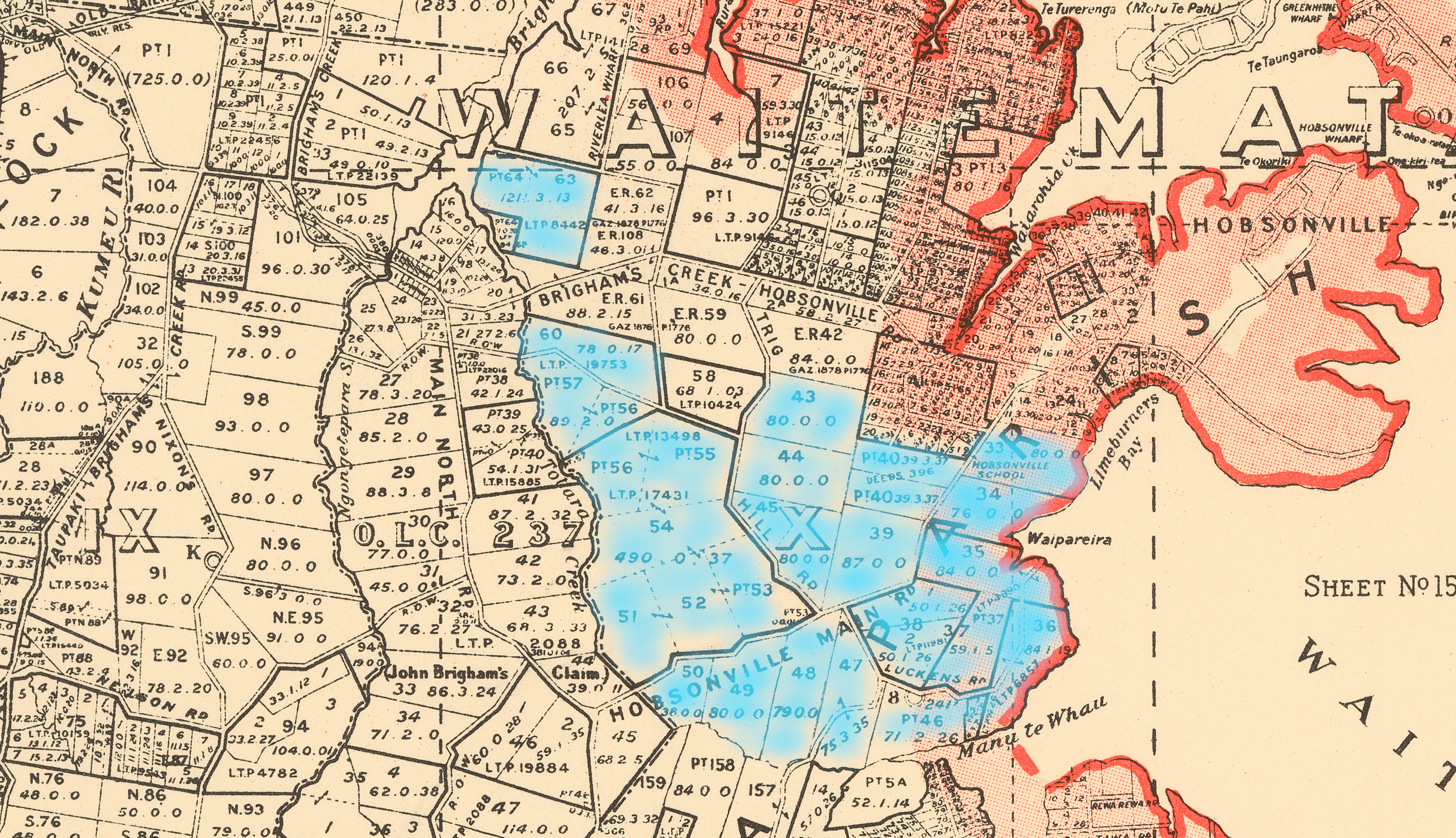
Map showing Chamberlin's holdings in New Zealand

Chamberlin arrived in Auckland in 1853. He had brought £20,000 with him and invested it in land, purchasing the Waihoihoi Estate near Drury as well as land in Raglan. Chamberlin's brother, Charles, came over from England with him to assist in the management of these properties. Chamberlin used his land for both farming and coal prospecting, the former being a largely unsuccessful venture. In July (Note: Chamberlin is registered as being the owner of some of these lands in April 1862) 1862 Chamberlin obtained 5 land grants totalling 25 lots in Hobsonville. Chamberlin's holdings were bounded by Lawson's Creek in the south, Totara Creek in the west, and the Waitemata Harbour in the east, with the northern extent of the land roughly being in parallel with the southern extent of Limeburners Bay. In 1867 Chamberlin advertised his 2,000 acres (810 ha) for flax cultivation.

=== Political career ===
In the 1860s, Chamberlin was a trustee of the Hunua Highway Board. When Joseph Newman resigned his membership in the House of Representatives for the Raglan electorate, Chamberlin was one of three candidates contesting the 1867 Raglan by-election. Chamberlin was nominated by Reader Wood but came last, getting 10% of the vote. During the premiership of Edward Stafford, Chamberlin was called to the New Zealand Legislative Council, effective from 8 February 1869. Chamberlin was an ineffective politician and most notable for attempting to pass a bill every session that would have banned female employment in hotel bars.

== Death ==
In April 1888 Chamberlin fell into a hole on his Drury property and drowned; he had long been prospecting on his land for coal and had recently dug the trench in which he drowned. The intention was for him to be buried at St Stephen's Chapel but the graveyard had been restricted for family burials, and his body was interred at St Thomas' Cemetery in Kohimarama instead. The funeral was attended by Frederick Whitaker, William Pollock Moat, and Frederick Moss.

Chamberlin's holdings passed to his wife, although the land in Hobsonville was subject to two Supreme Court cases, before being sold in 1894 to J.A. Laing, the wife of his daughter.

== Personal life ==
In 1859 Chamberlin returned to England to marry Elizabeth Heard. The couple honeymooned in Palestine before returning to New Zealand.

Chamberlin was a philanthropist who gave to charity both in his hometown and in New Zealand. Chamberlin was the director of the South British Insurance Company.
