= 1867 Raglan by-election =

New Zealand by-election

The 1867 Raglan by-election was a by-election held on 4 June 1887 in the Raglan electorate during the 4th New Zealand Parliament.

The by-election was caused by the resignation of the incumbent MP Joseph Newman on 9 April 1867.

The by-election was won by James Farmer.

== Results ==
1867 Raglan by-election
Party	Candidate	Votes	%	±%
Independent	James Farmer	224	56.85	
Independent	Joseph Crispe	127	32.23	
Independent	Henry Chamberlin	43	10.91	
Turnout		394		
Majority		97	24.62	
