= Highwic =

Historic house in New Zealand

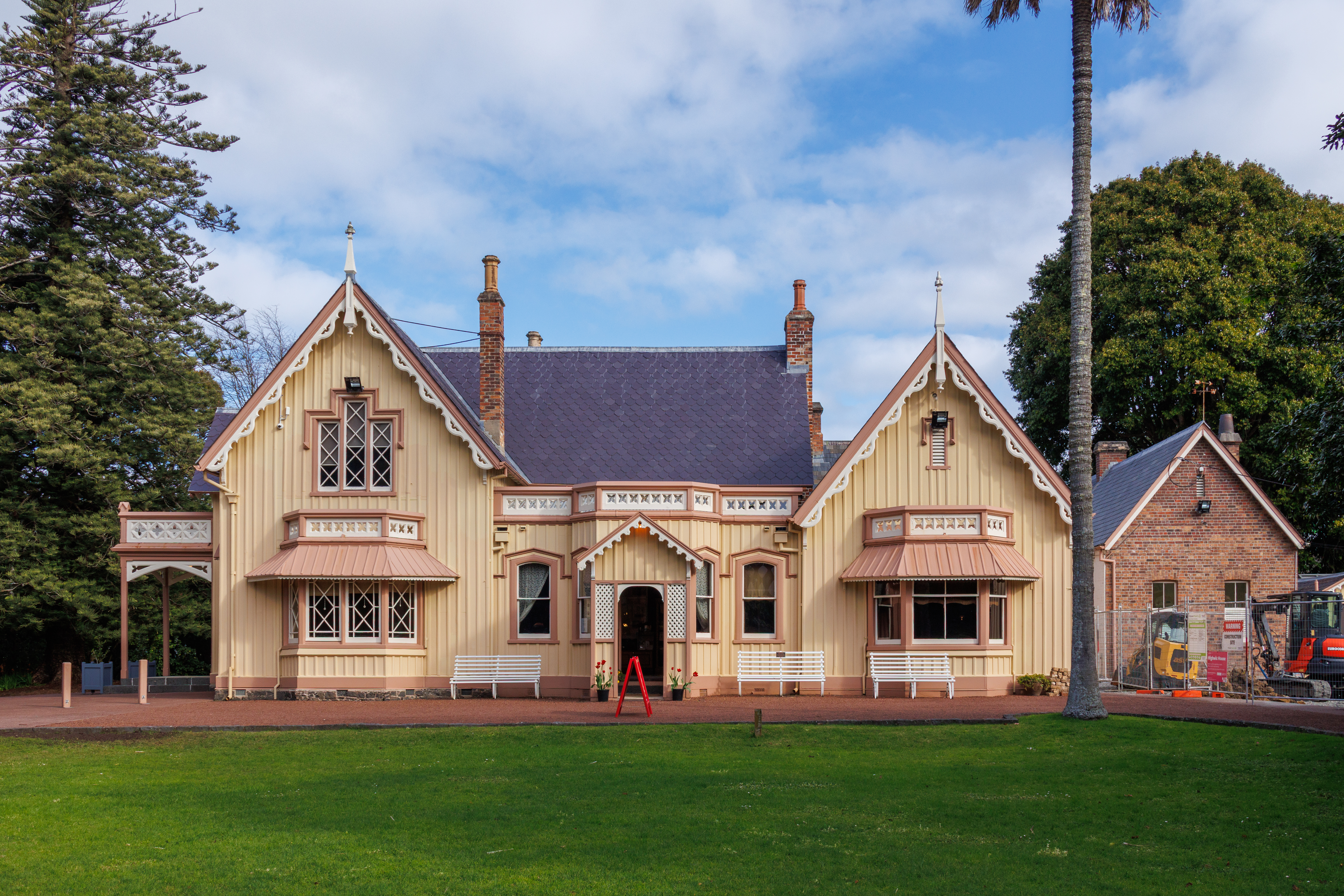

General information
- Status: Historic house museum
- Architectural style: Carpenter Gothic
- Location: 40 Gillies Avenue, Epsom (off Mortimer Pass Newmarket), New Zealand
- Coordinates: 36°52′18″S 174°46′30″E
- Opened: 1981

Heritage New Zealand – Category 1
- Designated: 7 April 1983
- Reference no.: 18

Highwic is a 19th-century house in Auckland, New Zealand, which is listed by Heritage New Zealand as a Category I structure. The house was built in 1862 for Alfred Buckland, a wealthy colonial settler and landowner. The building sits in an elevated position above Newmarket.

== History ==
Alfred Buckland purchased the land from William Hay in 1862 and began work on constructing a house for his family on the 2.5 acres (1.0 ha) section. Highwic was a timber villa with six or seven rooms and was based on a Carpenter Gothic design by A.J. Downing. Richard Keals, who designed another building for Buckland, may have been the architect of Highwic. The name Highwic likely comes from Highweek in Devonshire, as the Buckland family had connections to the village. Alfred Buckland grew to become quite wealthy from his pastoral business and as his personal wealth grew so did Highwic, with enlargements being carried out in 1873 and 1885.

Highwic is a large house of Carpenter Gothic design that was built for a wealthy colonial settler and landowner, Alfred Buckland. The building was erected in an elevated position looking out over the town of Newmarket. In 1861, the land was purchased by Alfred's first wife Eliza for £1,000. The family with seven children, moved into the house in 1862. Eliza Buckland had two more children during her short time alive in her new house, she died of pneumonia in July 1866. The original eight room house was extended in 1874, 1883 and 1884 as the Buckland family grew bigger and their wealth increased.

The building included a Drawing Room, several bedrooms, a boy's dormitory, a laundry, kitchen, scullery, outside stables, grooms accommodation, a billiard house, and a service yard. By the early 20th century two inside bathrooms were added with baths, hand basins, flushing toilets and hot and cold water on tap. Family descendants who lived in the house until 1978 made alterations of their own. The property was then jointly purchased by the New Zealand Historic Places Trust (now Heritage New Zealand) and Auckland City Council to save the site from subdivision. Highwic was opened as a historic house museum in 1981.

=== 150th anniversary ===
In 2012, year-long celebrations were planned to celebrate the 150th anniversary of the building including high tea at the house, seeing a collection of Victorian era costumes and floral arrangements as part of the Festival of Flowers plus music and arts. Several paintings by Lieutenant Colonel Arthur Morrow, a son-in-law of Alfred Buckland, were donated by his descendants to help furnish Highwic for the celebrations.

== Filming ==
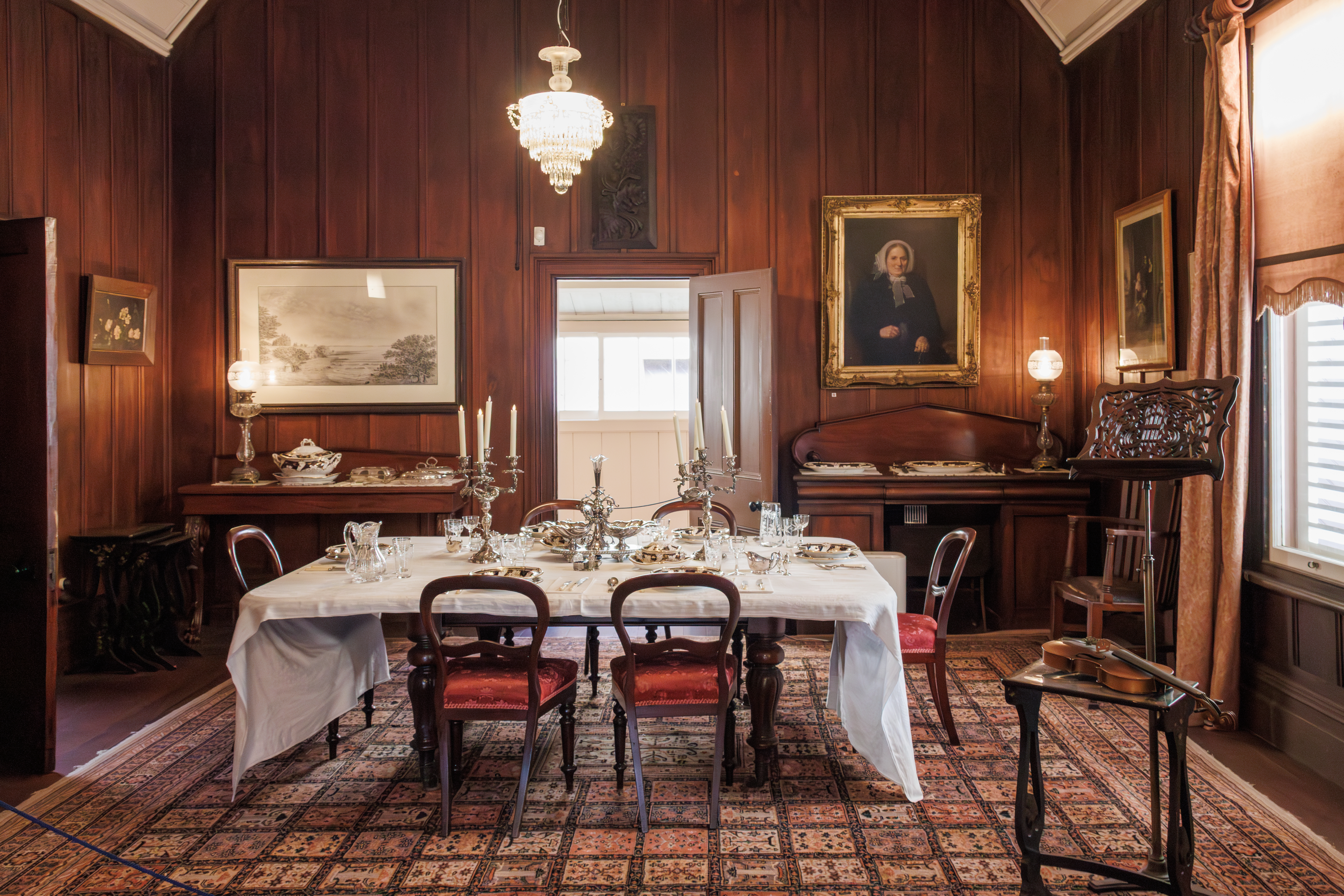
The Dining Room

The building has been used in filming for music acts such as Bic Runga, Rhys Darby, and also television shows such as East of Eden, The Jono Project and The Luminaries.
