= Hāre Pōmare =

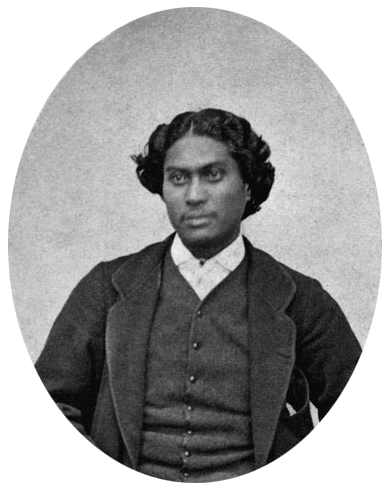
Hāre Pōmare photographed in 1864

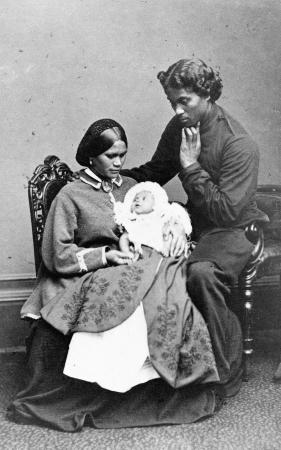
Hāre Pōmare with his wife and son, 1864

Hāre Pōmare (died 1864) was a New Zealand Māori, the son of Pōmare II, who identified with the Ngāpuhi and Ngati Manu iwi. His wife, Hariata Pōmare, was a Ngāpuhi woman from Te Ahuahu, near Ōhaeawai, who was the daughter of Pikimana Tutapuiti.

Hāre and Hariata Pōmare were members of a party of Māori people who travelled to England in 1863 in a tour organised by William Jenkins, a Wesleyan lay preacher. The members of the tour party quarrelled with Jenkins, as the Māori members of the tour travelled steerage class of the ship in unpleasant conditions and without fresh food, while Jenkins travelled first class. The Māori members continued to argue with Jenkins in England over his management of the tour and he eventually abandoned them.

The Māori members of the tour performed songs and dances at receptions. They were presented to the Prince and Princess of Wales and met Queen Victoria in July 1863 at a reception at Osborne House, on the Isle of Wight.

Hāre and Hariata stayed with Elizabeth Fairburn Colenso in Tottenham, London. On 26 October 1863, Hariata gave birth to Albert Victor, who was named after the Queen's deceased husband. On 4 December 1863, Elizabeth accompanied Hariata and Hāre as interpreter on a visit to Queen Victoria at Windsor Castle to present Albert Victor. Queen Victoria was made the godmother of Albert Victor Pōmare.

The family returned to New Zealand travelling first class with the Queen paying their fares, and they arrived in Auckland on 7 May 1864. Hāre Pōmare is believed to have died in Wellington later that year. Hariata remarried. Albert Victor Pōmare was educated at St Stephen's school in Auckland.
