= 1865 Raglan by-election =

New Zealand by-election

The 1865 Raglan by-election was a by-election held on 19 April 1865 in the Raglan electorate during the 3rd New Zealand Parliament.

The by-election was caused by the resignation of the incumbent MP Charles John Taylor on 1 April 1865.

The by-election was won by William Buckland.

As no other candidates were nominated, he was declared duly elected; Joseph Crispe had retired from the contest.
