= James Farmer (politician) =

New Zealand politician (1823–1895)

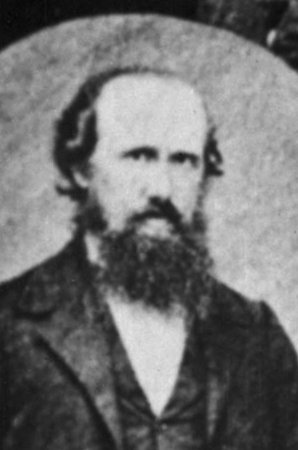
Farmer in 1860

James Farmer (1823–1895) was a 19th-century Member of Parliament in the Waikato region, New Zealand.

New Zealand Parliament
Years	Term	Electorate	Party
1859–1860	2nd	Marsden	Independent
1867–1870	4th	Raglan	Independent

He represented the Marsden electorate from 1859 to 1860 (when he was defeated for Onehunga), and then the Raglan electorate from 1867 to 1870, when he retired.

He was appointed to the Legislative Council on 3 July 1871, and served until he resigned on 29 July 1874.

Having made his fortune from mining "speculation" at Thames he retired to live as a gentleman in London. On their 1875–76 visit to Britain, James Hector was delighted that Mrs Farmer takes all care of Mrs Hector off my hands which leaves me quite free (to visit fellow scientists).

New Zealand Parliament
New constituency	Member of Parliament for Marsden; 1859–1860	Succeeded by John Munro
Preceded by Joseph Newman	Member of Parliament for Raglan; 1867–1870	Vacant Constituency abolished, recreated in 1911 Title next held by Richard Bollard
