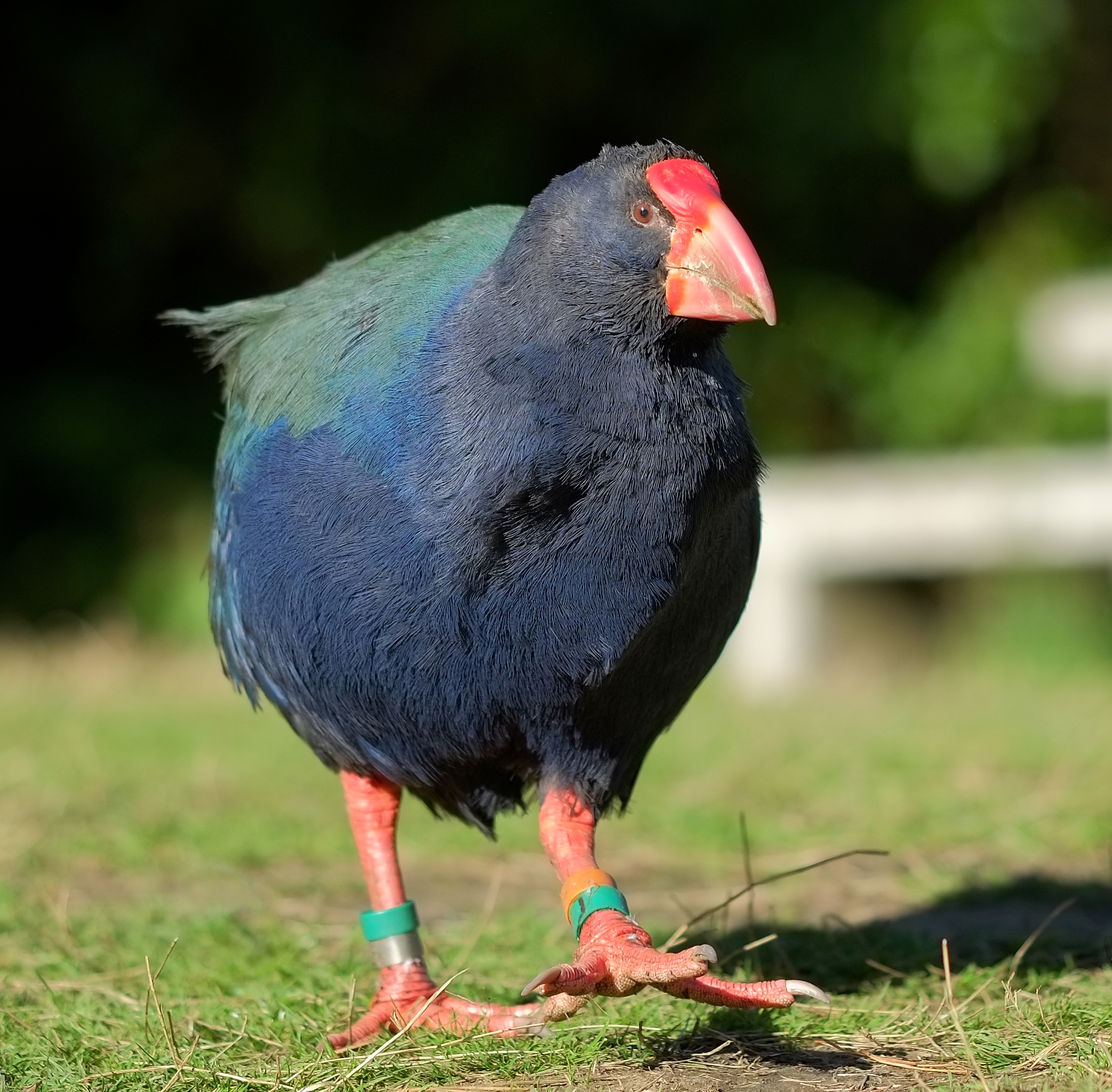
- Male South Island takahē at Zealandia

Conservation status
- Endangered (IUCN 3.1)

- Nationally Vulnerable (NZ TCS)

Scientific classification
- Kingdom: Animalia
- Phylum: Chordata
- Class: Aves
- Order: Gruiformes
- Family: Rallidae
- Genus: Porphyrio
- Species: P. hochstetteri

Binomial name
- Porphyrio hochstetteri (A.B. Meyer, 1883)
- Distribution of the South Island takahē, including sanctuaries

Synonyms
- Notornis mantelli hochstetteri; Porphyrio mantelli hochstetteri

= Takahē =

South Island takahē

Species of bird

The South Island takahē (Porphyrio hochstetteri) is a flightless swamphen indigenous to New Zealand and the largest living member of the rail family. It is often known by the abbreviated name takahē, which it shares with the recently (14th century) extinct North Island takahē. The two takahē species are also known as notornis.

Takahē were hunted extensively by both early European settlers and Māori, and takahē bones have been found in middens in the South Island. Fossil remains have also been found across the South Island. They were not named and described by Europeans until 1847, and then only from fossil bones. In 1850 a living bird was captured, and three more collected in the 19th century. After another bird was captured in 1898, and no more were to be found, the species was presumed extinct. Fifty years later, however, after a carefully planned search, South Island takahē were dramatically rediscovered in November 1948 by Geoffrey Orbell in an isolated valley in the South Island's Murchison Mountains. The species is now managed by the New Zealand Department of Conservation, whose Takahē Recovery Programme maintains populations on several offshore islands as well as Takahē Valley. Takahē has been reintroduced to numerous locations across the country. Although South Island takahē are still a threatened species, their NZTCS status was downgraded in 2016 from Nationally Critical to Nationally Vulnerable. As of 2023, the population is around 500 and is growing by 8 percent per year.

== Scientific description and naming ==
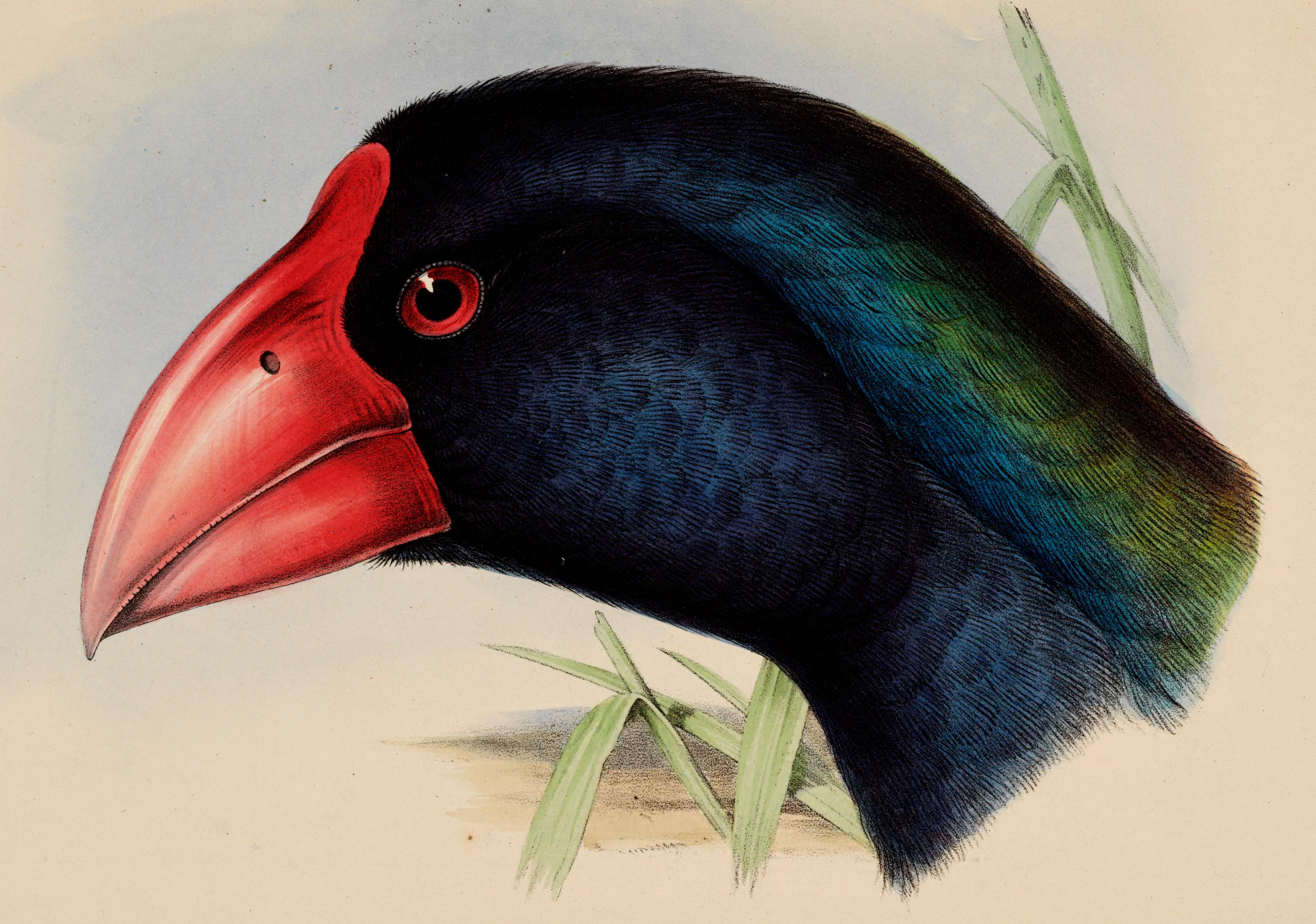
The first illustration of the South Island takahē from Gideon and Walter Mantell's notice of the discovery in 1850

Anatomist Richard Owen was sent fossil bird bones found in 1847 in South Taranaki on the North Island by collector Walter Mantell, and in 1848 he coined the genus Notornis ("southern bird") for them, naming the new species Notornis mantelli. The bird was presumed by Western science to be another extinct species like the moa.

Two years later, a group of sealers in Tamatea / Dusky Sound, Fiordland, encountered a large bird which they chased with their dogs. "It ran with great speed, and upon being captured uttered loud screams, and fought and struggled violently; it was kept alive three or four days on board the schooner and then killed, and the body roasted and ate by the crew, each partaking of the dainty, which was declared to be delicious." Walter Mantell happened to meet the sealers, and secured the bird's skin from them. He sent it to his father, palaeontologist Gideon Mantell, who realised this was Notornis, a living bird known only from fossil bones, and presented it in 1850 to a meeting of the Zoological Society of London. A second specimen was sent to Gideon Mantell in 1851, caught by Māori on Secretary Island, Fiordland. (Takahē were well known to Māori, who travelled long distances to hunt them. The bird's name comes from the Māori verb takahi, to stamp or trample.)

Only two more South Island takahē were collected by Europeans in the 19th century. One was caught by a rabbiter's dog on the eastern side of Lake Te Anau in 1879. It was bought by what is now the State Museum of Zoology, Dresden, for £105, and destroyed during the bombing of Dresden in World War II. Another takahē was caught by another dog, also on the shore of Lake Te Anau, on 7 August 1898; the dog, named 'Rough', was owned by musterer Jack Ross. Ross tried to revive the female takahē, but it died, and he delivered it to curator William Benham at Otago Museum. In excellent condition, it was purchased by the New Zealand government for £250 and was put on display; for many years it was the only mounted specimen in New Zealand, and the only takahē on display anywhere in the world.

After 1898, hunters and settlers continued to report sightings of large blue-and-green birds, described as "giant pukakis" (pūkeko or Australasian swamphens); one group chased but could not catch a bird "the size of a goose, with blue-green feathers and the speed of a racehorse". None of the sightings were authenticated, and the only specimens collected were fossil bones. The takahē was considered extinct.

== Taxonomy and systematics ==
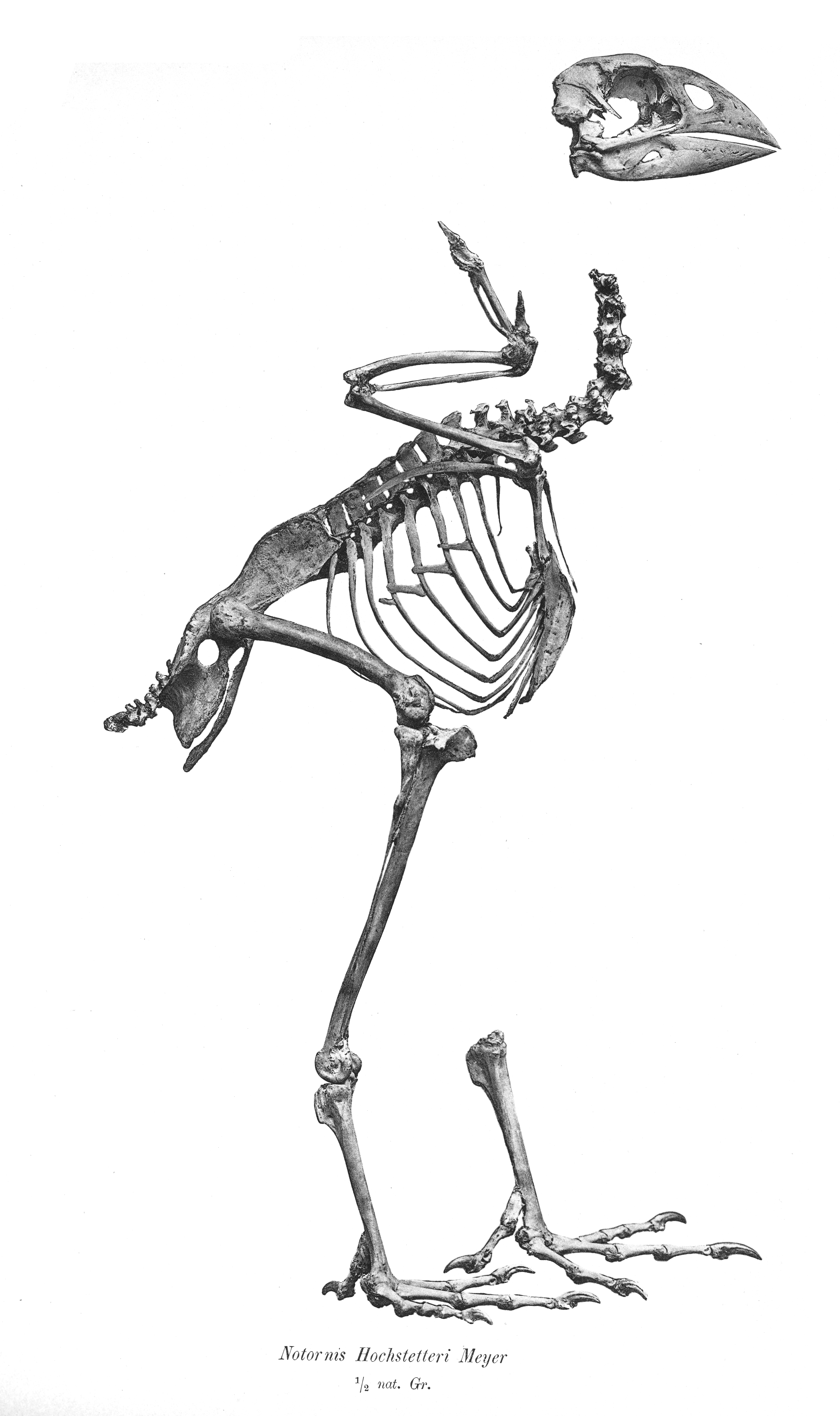
Notornis hochstetteri, from Meyer's 1883 description

The third takahē collected went to the Königlich Zoologisches und Anthropologisch-Ethnographisches Museum in Dresden, and the Director Adolf Bernhard Meyer examined the skeleton while preparing his classification of the museum's birds, Abbildungen von Vogelskeletten (1879–1895). He decided the skeletal differences between the Fiordland bird and Owen's North Island specimen were sufficient to make it a separate species, which he called Notornis hochstetteri, after the Austrian geologist Ferdinand von Hochstetter.

Over the second half of the 20th century, the two Notornis species were gradually relegated to subspecies: Notornis mantelli mantelli in the North Island, and Notornis mantelli hochstetteri in the South. They were then incorporated into the same genus as the closely related Australasian swamphen or pūkeko (Porphyrio porphyrio), becoming a subspecies of Porphyrio mantelli. Pūkeko are members of a widespread species of swamphen, but based on fossil evidence have only been in New Zealand for a few hundred years, arriving from Australia after the islands were first settled by Polynesians.

A morphological and genetic study of living and extinct Porphyrio revealed that North and South Island takahē were, as originally proposed by Meyer, separate species. The North Island species (P. mantelli, as described by Owen) was known to Māori as moho; it is extinct and only known from skeletal remains and one possible specimen. Moho were taller and more slender than takahē, and share a common ancestor with living pūkeko. Although it was historically proposed that the two takahē species were unrelated, a genetic analysis published in 2024 suggested that they are each other's closest relatives and likely descended from a single ancestor that colonised New Zealand, with the split between the two species dated at around 4 to 1.5 million years ago.

- Porphyrio
  - Allen's gallinule (Porphyrio alleni)
  - - - Azure gallinule (Porphyrio flavirostris)
      - American purple gallinule (Porphyrio martinica)
    - - - Black-backed swamphen (Porphyrio indicus)
        - Western swamphen (Porphyrio porphyrio)
      - - African swamphen (Porphyrio madagascariensis)
        - - - South Island takahē (Porphyrio hochstetteri)
            - †North Island takahē/Moho (Porphyrio mantelli)
          - - - Grey-headed swamphen (Porphyrio poliocephalus)
              - Philippine swamphen (Porphyrio pulverulentus)
            - Australasian swamphen (Porphyrio melanotus)

== Rediscovery ==
Living South Island takahē were rediscovered in an expedition led by Invercargill-based physician Geoffrey Orbell near Lake Te Anau in the Murchison Mountains, on 20 November 1948. The expedition started when footprints of an unknown bird were found near Lake Te Anau. Two takahē were caught but returned to the wild after photos were taken of the rediscovered bird.

== Description ==
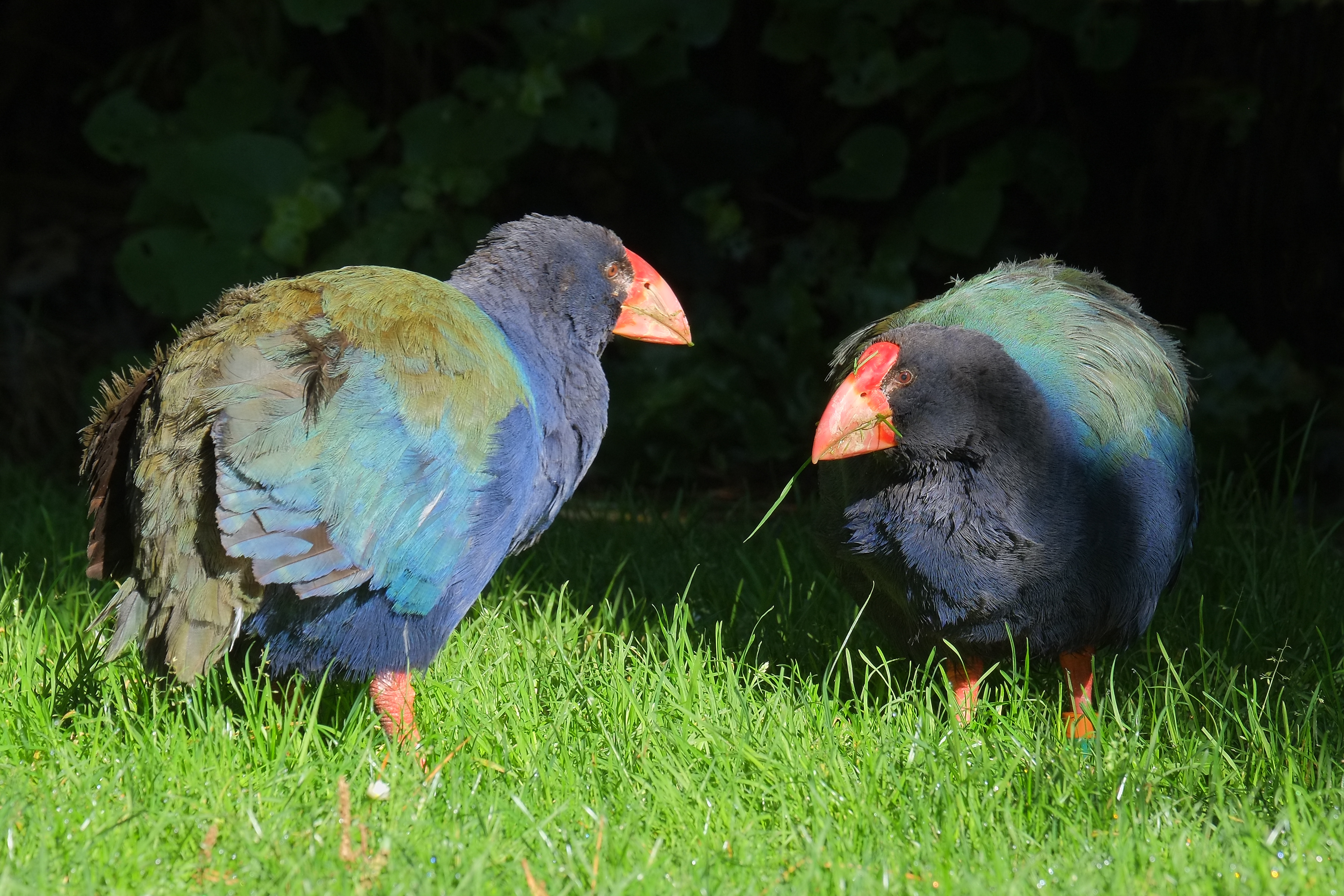
The colour of both female and male adults is mainly purple-blue with a greenish back and inner wings.

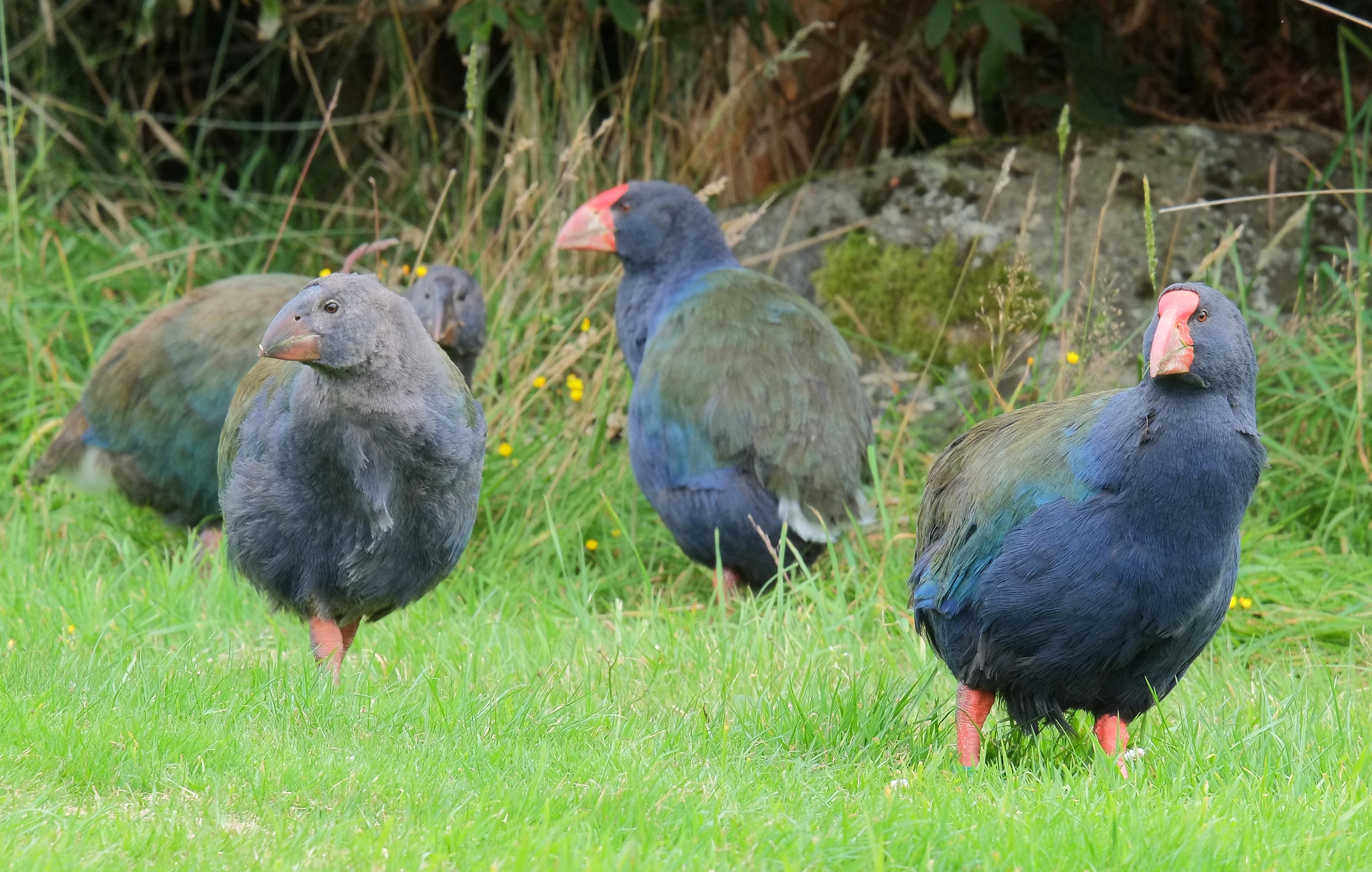
Two juveniles and two adults (with red beaks) at Orokonui Ecosanctuary

The South Island takahē is the largest living member of the family Rallidae. Its overall length averages 63 cm (25 in) and its average weight is about 2.7 kg (6.0 lb) in males and 2.3 kg (5.1 lb) in females, ranging from 1.8–4.2 kg (4.0–9.3 lb). The lifespan of a takahē can range from 18 years in the wild or 22 in animal sanctuaries. Its standing height is around 50 cm (20 in). It is a stocky, powerful bird, with short strong legs and a massive bill which can deliver a painful bite to the unwary. Although a flightless bird, the takahē sometimes uses its reduced wings to help it clamber up slopes.

South Island takahē plumage, beaks, and legs show typical gallinule colours. Adult takahē plumage is silky, iridescent, and mostly dark-blue or navy-blue on the head, neck, and underside, peacock blue on the wings. The back and inner wings are teal and green, becoming olive-green at the tail, which is white underneath. Takahē have a bright scarlet frontal shield and "carmine beaks marbled with shades of red". Their scarlet legs were described as "crayfish-red" by one of the early rediscoverers.

Sexes are similar; the females are slightly smaller, and may display frayed tail feathers when nesting. Chicks are covered with jet-black fluffy down when hatched, and have very large brown legs, with a dark white-tipped bill. Immature takahē have a duller version of adult colouring, with a dark bill that turns red as they mature.

South Island takahē are noisy. They have a non-directional warning womph call, which was described by the rediscoverers of takahē as someone "whistling to them over a .303 cartridge case", and a loud clowp call. The contact call is easily confused with that of the weka (Gallirallus australis), but is generally more resonant and deeper.

== Behaviour and ecology ==
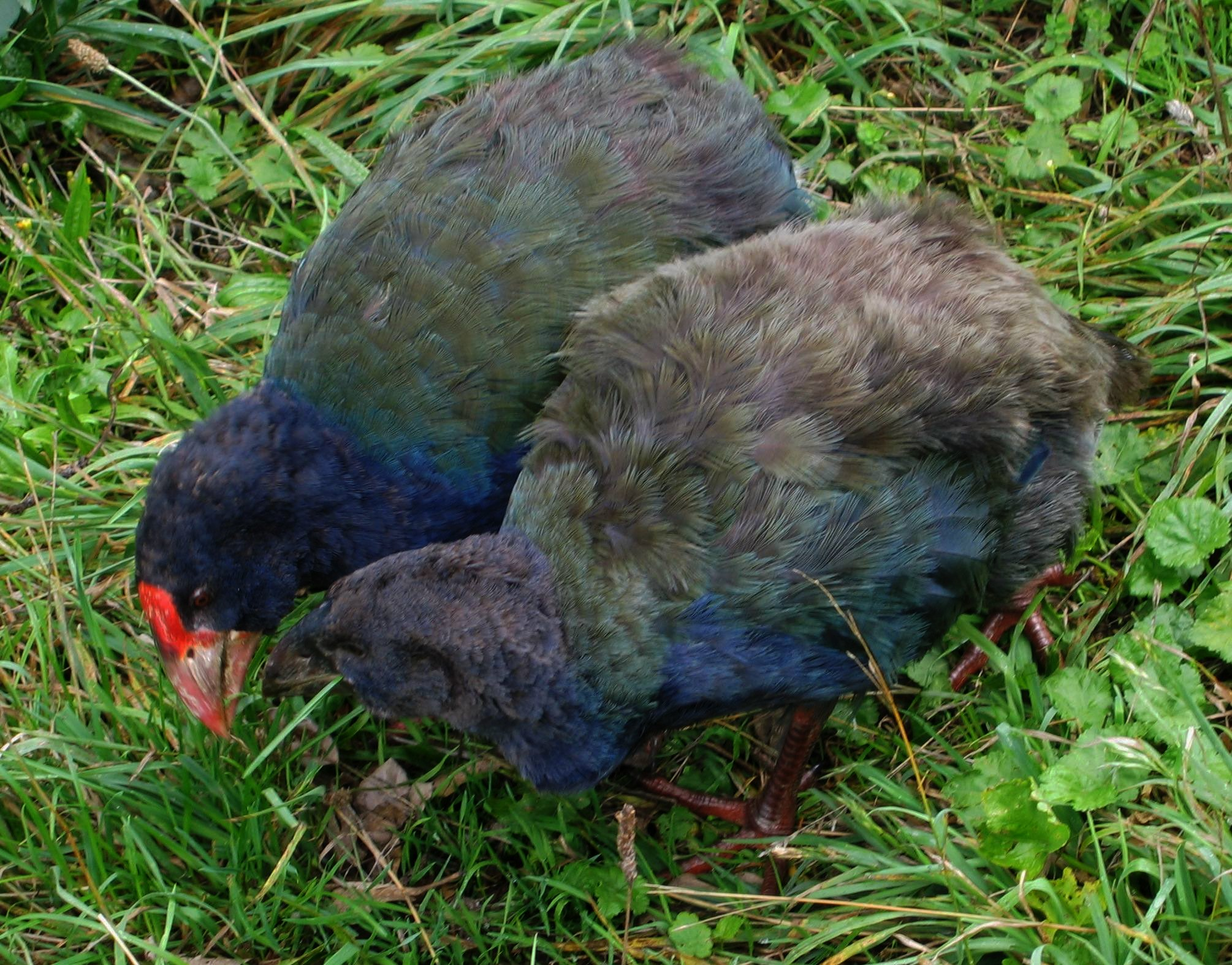
Adult feeding a chick

The South Island takahē is a sedentary and flightless bird currently found in alpine grasslands habitats. It is territorial and remains in the grassland until the arrival of snow, when it descends to the forest or scrub. It eats grass, shoots, and insects, but predominantly leaves of Chionochloa tussocks and other alpine grass species. The South Island takahē can often be seen plucking a snow grass (Danthonia flavescens) stalk, taking it into one claw, and eating only the soft lower parts, which appears to be its favourite food, while the rest is discarded.

A South Island takahē has been recorded feeding on a paradise duckling at Zealandia. Although this behaviour was previously unknown, the related Australasian swamphen or pūkeko occasionally feeds on eggs and nestlings of other birds as well.

=== Breeding ===
The South Island takahē is monogamous, with pairs remaining together from 12 years to, probably, their entire lives. It builds a bulky nest under bushes and scrub, and lays one to three buff eggs. The chick survival rate is between 25% and 80%, depending on location.

== Distribution and habitat ==
The takahē's preferred habitat is alpine grasslands. The species is still present in the location where it was rediscovered in the Murchison Mountains. Small numbers have also been successfully translocated to five predator-free offshore islands, Tiritiri Matangi, Kapiti, Maud, Mana and Motutapu. Additionally, captive takahē can be viewed at Te Anau and Pūkaha / Mount Bruce National wildlife centres. In June 2006 a pair of takahē were relocated to the Maungatautari Restoration Project. In September 2010 a pair of takahē (Hamilton and Guy) were released at Willowbank Wildlife Reserve – the first non-Department of Conservation institution to hold this species. In January 2011 two takahē were released in Zealandia, Wellington, and in mid-2015, two more takahē were released on Rotoroa Island in the Hauraki Gulf. There have also been relocations onto the Tawharanui Peninsula. In 2014 two pairs of Takahē were released into Wairakei golf and sanctuary, a private fenced sanctuary at Wairakei north of Taupō, the first chick was born there in November 2015. At October 2017 there were 347 takahē accounted for, an increase of 41 over 2016. The Orokonui Ecosanctuary is home to a single takahē breeding pair, Quammen and Paku. The pair successfully bred two chicks in 2018, both of which died from exposure after heavy rains in November 2018. The deaths caused some controversy with regards to the Ecosanctuary's policy of "non-interference".

In 2018, eighteen South Island takahē were reintroduced to the Kahurangi National Park, 100 years after their local extinction.

Following the 2018 release, a second re-introduction has taken place on Te Waipounamu in August 2023, eighteen takahē were released in the Upper Whakatipu Waimāori Valley in Ngāi Tahu owned Greenstone Station. Later that year in October, six more takahē were released onto the property.

== Status and conservation ==
The near extinction of the formerly widespread South Island takahē is due to a number of factors: over-hunting, loss of habitat and introduced predators have all played a part. The introduction of red deer (Cervus elaphus) represent a severe competition for food, while stoats (Mustela erminea) take a role as predators. The spread of the forests in post-glacial Pleistocene-Holocene has contributed to the reduction of habitat. Since the species is K-selected, i.e. is long-lived, reproduces slowly, takes several years to reach maturity, and had a large range that has drastically contracted in comparatively few generations, inbreeding depression is a significant problem. The recovery efforts are hampered especially by low fertility of the remaining birds. Genetic analyses have been employed to select captive breeding stock in an effort to preserve the maximum genetic diversity.

=== Decline of takahē ===
The causes of the pre-European decline of takahē were postulated by Williams (1962) and later supported in a detailed report by Mills et al. (1984). They held that climate changes were the main cause of the low numbers of takahē before European settlement. The environmental conditions prior to the period of European settlement were not suitable for takahē, and eliminated most of the population. The rising temperatures were not tolerated by this group of birds. Takahē are adapted to alpine grasslands, and the post-glacial era modified those zones, causing a sharp decline in the takahē population.

Secondly, they suggested that Polynesian settlers arriving about 800–1,000 years ago, bringing dogs and Polynesian rats (Rattus exulans) and hunting takahē for food, started another decline. European settlement in the nineteenth century almost wiped them out through hunting and introducing mammals such as deer which competed for food and predators (e.g. stoats) which preyed on them directly.

=== Takahē population, conservation and protection ===
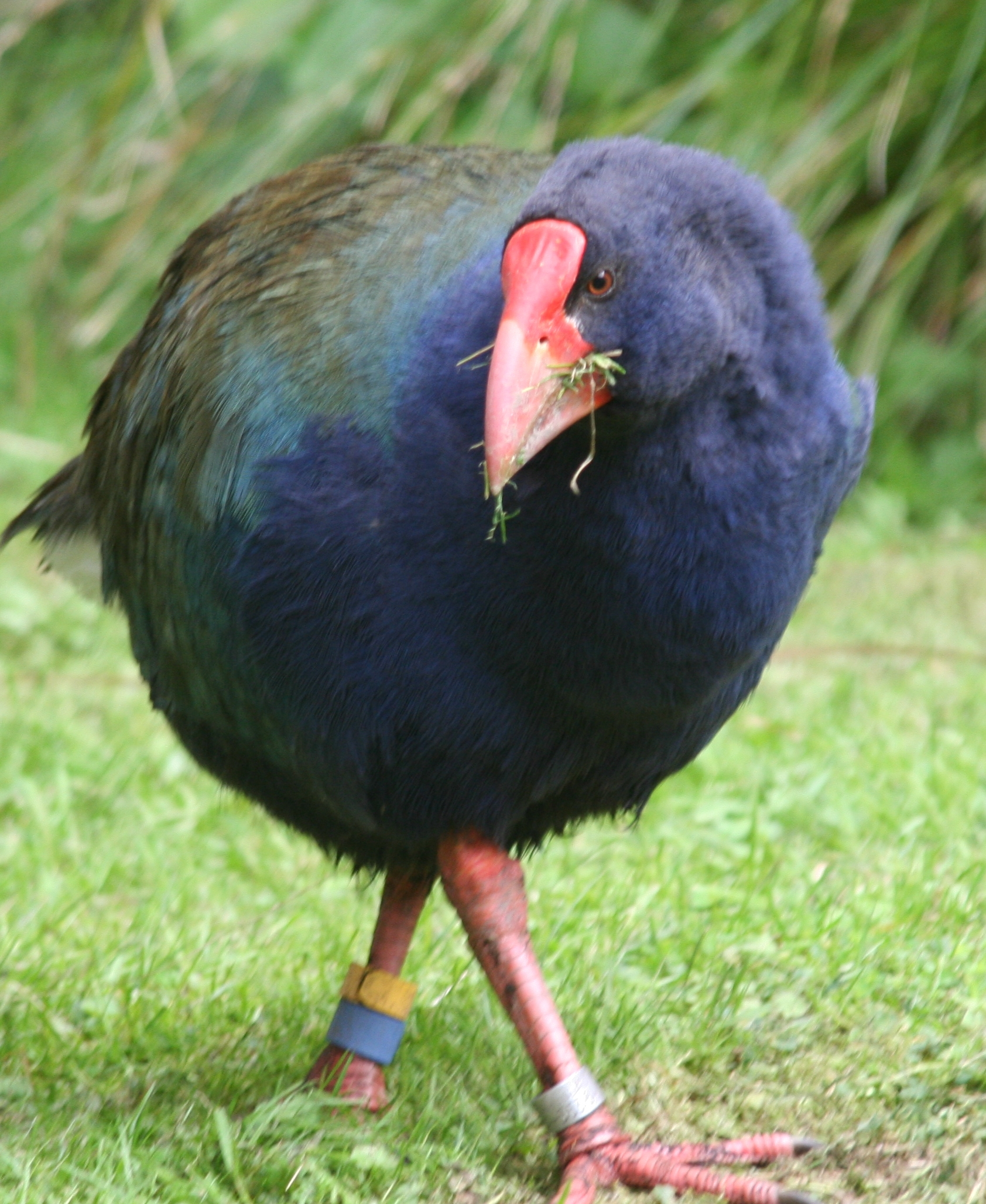
Ringed female South Island takahē at Kapiti Island

After long threats of extinction, South Island takahē now find protection in Fiordland National Park (New Zealand's largest national park). However, the species has not made a stable recovery in this habitat since they were rediscovered in November 1948. In fact, the takahē population was at 400 before it was reduced to 118 in 1982 due to competition with Fiordland domestic deer. Conservationists noticed the threat that deer posed to takahē survival, and the national park has now implemented deer control with hunting by helicopter.

The rediscovery of the South Island takahē caused great public interest. The New Zealand government took immediate action by closing off a remote part of Fiordland National Park to prevent the birds from being bothered. However, at the moment of rediscovery, there were different perspectives on how the bird should be conserved. At first, the Forest and Bird Society advocated for takahē to be left to work out their own "destiny", but many worried that the takahē would be incapable of making a comeback and thus become extinct like New Zealand's native huia. Interventionists then sought to relocate the takahē to "island sanctuaries" and breed them in captivity. Ultimately, no action was taken for nearly a decade due to a lack of resources and a desire to avoid conflict.

The Burwood Takahē Breeding Centre was opened in 1985 at a site near Te Anau. The initial approach was to incubate eggs collected from nests and raise them by hand. Staff used hand-held puppets that replayed sounds of adult contact calls while feeding and interacting with the chicks, to help prevent the birds becoming "imprinted" on humans. Fibreglass replicas of adult birds were also placed in areas where the chicks slept. These methods were not used after 2011.

Biologists from the Department of Conservation drew on their experience with designing remote island sanctuaries to establish a safe habitat for takahē and translocate birds onto Maud Island (Marlborough Sounds), Mana Island (near Wellington), Kapiti Island (Kapiti Coast), and Tiritiri Matangi Island (Hauraki Gulf). The success of these translocations has meant that the takahē's island metapopulation appears to have reached its carrying capacity, as revealed by the increasing ratio of non-breeding to breeding adults and declines in produced offspring. This may lead to reduced population growth rates and increased rates of inbreeding over time, thereby posing problems regarding the maintenance of genetic diversity and thus takahē survival in the long term.

Recently, human intervention has been required to maintain the breeding success of the takahē, which is relatively low in the wild compared to other, less threatened species, so methods such as the removal of infertile eggs from nests and the captive rearing of chicks have been introduced to manage the takahē population. The Fiordland takahē population has a successful degree of reproductive output due to these management methods: the number of chicks per pairing with infertile egg removal and captive rearing is 0.66, compared to 0.43 for regions without any breeding management.

It was reported that several takahē have accidentally been killed by hunters under contract to the Department of Conservation in the course of control measures aimed at reducing populations of the similar-looking pūkeko. One bird was killed in 2009 and four more—equivalent to 5% of the total population—in 2015.

=== Future efforts for protection ===
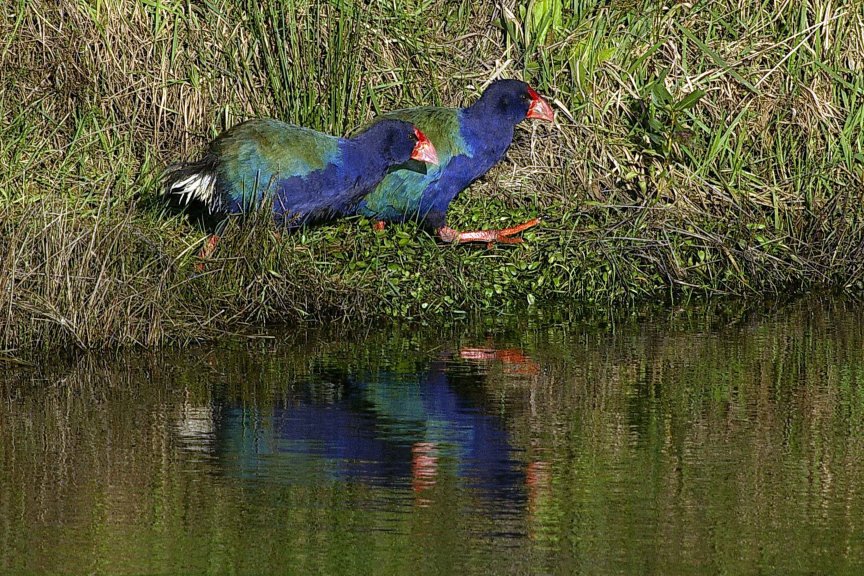
South Island takahē released at Maungatautari Restoration Project ecological island, Waikato District, North Island in June 2006

The original recovery strategies and goals set in the early 1980s, both long-term and short-term, are now well under way.

The programme to move South Island takahē to predator-free island refuges, where the birds also receive supplementary feeding, began in 1984. Takahē can now be found on five small islands; Maud Island in the Marlborough Sounds, Mana Island and Kapiti Island off Wellington's west coast, and Tiritiri Matangi Island and Motutapu Island in the Hauraki Gulf. The Department of Conservation also runs a captive breeding and rearing programme at the Burwood Breeding Centre near Te Anau which has up to 25 breeding pairs. Chicks are reared with minimal human contact. The offspring of the captive birds are used for new island releases and to add to the wild population in the Murchison Mountains. The Department of Conservation also manages wild takahē nests to boost the birds' recovery.

An important management development has been the stringent control of deer in the Murchison Mountains and other takahē areas of Fiordland National Park. Following the introduction of deer hunting by helicopter, deer numbers have decreased dramatically and alpine vegetation is now recovering from years of heavy browsing. This improvement in its habitat has helped to increase takahē breeding success and survival. As of 2009, ongoing research aims to measure the impact of attacks by stoats and thus decide whether stoats are a significant problem requiring management.

== Population ==
One of the original long-term goals was to establish a self-sustaining population of well over 500 South Island takahē. The population stood at 263 at the beginning of 2013. In 2016 the population rose to 306 takahē. In 2017 the population rose to 347—a 13 percent increase from the last year. In 2019, it increased to 418. As of 2023, the population is around 500.
