= Mehetabel Newman =

English missionary in New Zealand (1822–1908)

Mehetabel Newman (1822 – 8 January 1908) was a Methodist missionary, a letter-writer, a teacher and a homemaker in New Zealand.

Newman was baptised on 22 December 1822 at Willoughby, Lincolnshire. In 1844, she emigrated to New Zealand. She initially lived with her sister Jane and Jane's husband, the missionary George Buttle. Three other siblings were living in New Zealand, including her older brother Joseph Newman. Her sister Elizabeth was married to the missionary William Thomas Fairburn.

She married John Warren in 1878.
