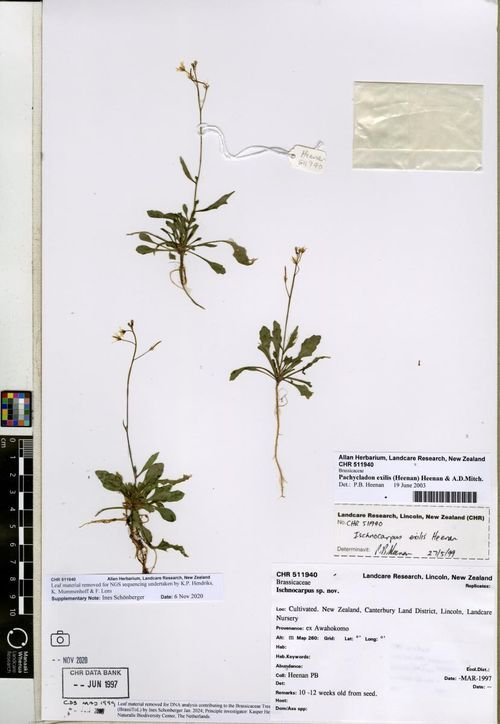
- Herbarium specimen of Pachycladon exile

Scientific classification
- Kingdom: Plantae
- Clade: Embryophytes
- Clade: Tracheophytes
- Clade: Spermatophytes
- Clade: Angiosperms
- Clade: Eudicots
- Clade: Rosids
- Order: Brassicales
- Family: Brassicaceae
- Genus: Pachycladon
- Species: P. exile

Binomial name
- Pachycladon exile (Heenan) Heenan & A.D.Mitch.

Synonyms
- Ischnocarpus exilis Heenan

= Pachycladon exile =

Species of flowering plant

Pachycladon exile is a species of plant in family Brassicaceae that is endemic to the South Island of New Zealand. Commonly known as limestone cress, it is a perennial herb with hairy leaves that is only found on one specific limestone outcrop site. It has been used to analyse principles behind adaptive radiation, together with other species of Pachycladon. Its conservation status is Threatened - Nationally Critical.

== Taxonomy ==
Pachycladon exile is a species of plant that is endemic to the South Island of New Zealand in the family Brassicaceae. P. exile was originally described in 1999 as Ischnocarpus exilis by Peter Heenan. It was later transferred to the genus Pachycladon in 2002.

P. exile is morphologically similar to P. novae-zelandiae. It can be distinguished from that species by its slender growth habit, terete ovary, slender siliques, smaller flowers, leaves and inflorescences, and a style that is small but distinct. It is also similar to P. cheesemanii, as both species are polycarpic and have woody caudices, short branches, slender inflorescences, terete siliques, heterophyllous leaves, and seeds that are uniseriate and without wings.

== Description ==
P. exile is a perennial, polycarpic, heterophyllous rosette plant that has slender inflorescences, a woody caudex, short branches, and hairy, heterophyllous leaves. Its fruit is a terete silique, and its seeds do not have wings, and are uniseriate.

== Distribution and habitat ==
Pachycladon exile is only found on a specific limestone outcrop site in the Waitaki Valley. It is found in habitats that have a high fertility rock substrate, such as limestone, schist, and volcanics, from 10 to 1600 m above sea level.

== Phylogeny ==
P. exile is closely related to P. cheesemanii. Alongside other Pachycladon species it has been used to analyse principles behind adaptive radiation.

== Conservation status ==
Pachycladon exile is listed as Threatened - Nationally Critical, with the qualifiers CD (Conservation Dependent), DPT (Data Poor Trend), EF (Extreme Fluctuations), OL (One Location) in the most recent assessment (2023) of the New Zealand Threatened Classification for plants.

It is the sixth most endangered species in New Zealand.

It was featured as Critter of the Week on 12 May 2019 on Radio New Zealand.

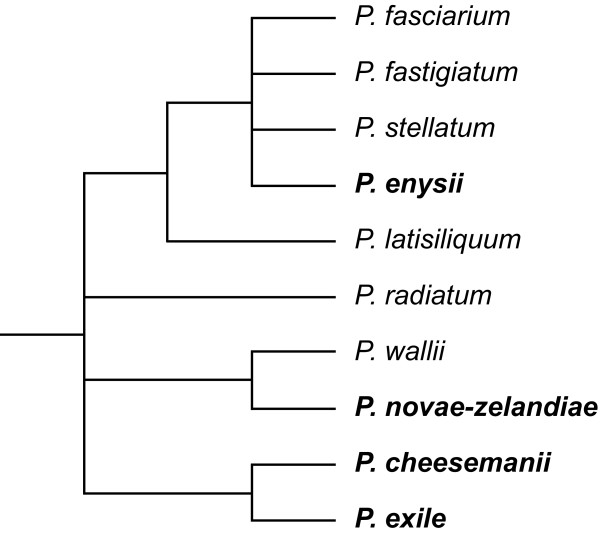
Phylogenetic relationships in Pachycladon
