= Alfred Buckland =

Landowner, auctioneer, farmer, pastoralist, businessman

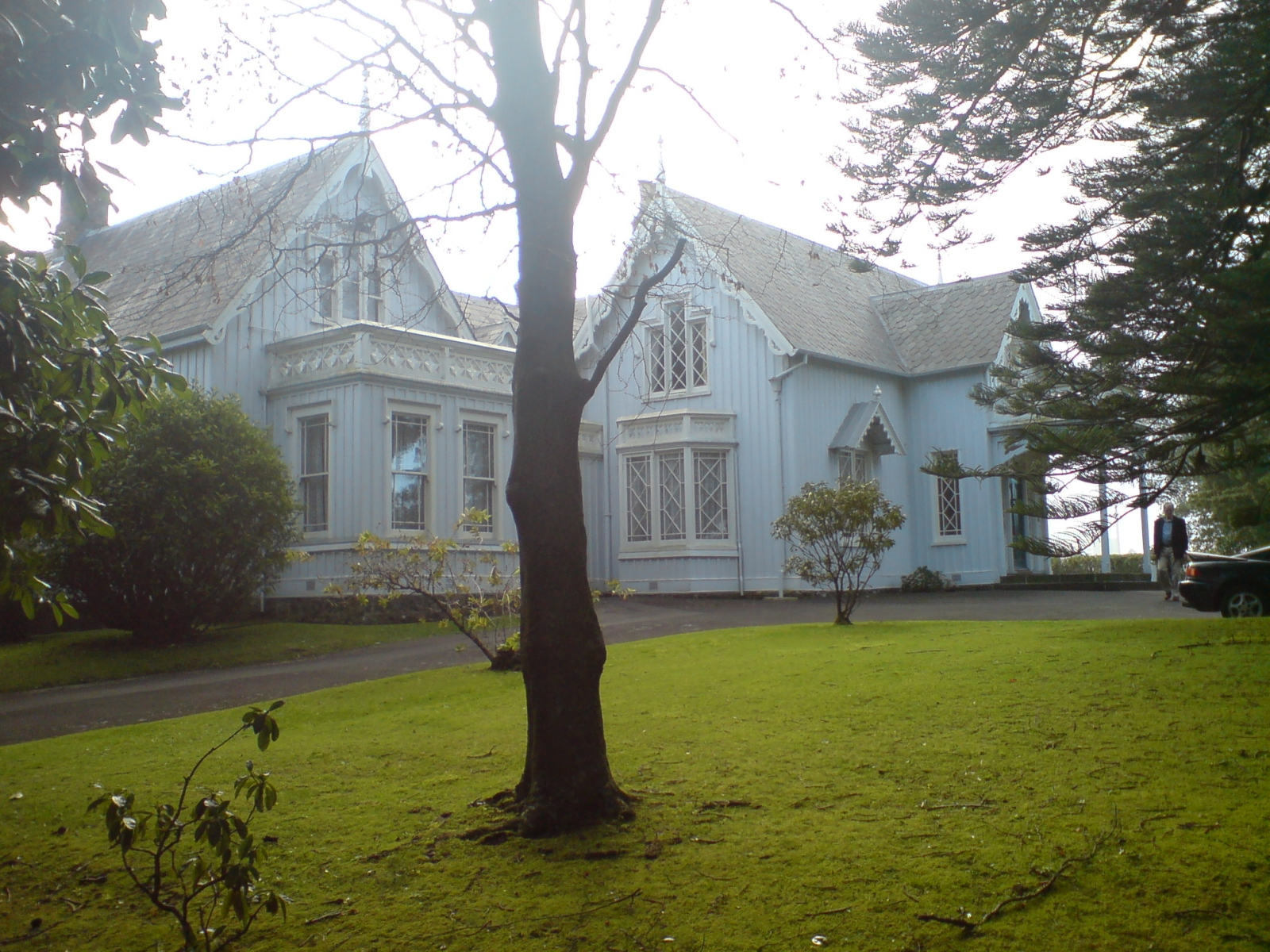
Buckland's house Highwic above Newmarket

Alfred Buckland (17 December 1825 – 12 June 1903) was a New Zealand landowner, auctioneer, farmer, pastoralist and businessman. His house, Highwic, is registered by Heritage New Zealand as a Category I structure, with registration number 18.

== Family ==
Buckland was born in Newton Abbot, Devonshire, England on 17 December 1825. His mother was Elizabeth (née Mortimore) and his father was the broker John Buckland. William Buckland was an elder brother who had arrived in Auckland in 1841 via Adelaide. Frank Buckland and John Buckland were his nephews. Their sister (his niece), the artist Bessie Hocken, was married to Thomas Hocken.

== Arrival in New Zealand ==
According to his obituary, Buckland was a farmer before leaving England in August 1850. Alfred and his wife Eliza arrived in New Zealand on the Sir Edward Paget in December 1850. In 1867, Buckland married Matilda Frodshan, shortly after the death of Eliza.

== Life in New Zealand ==
Buckland supplied horses to the British troops during the New Zealand Wars and along with James Banks, Thomas Morrin and then-Mayor of Auckland J. McCocsh Clark sold off a piece of land near Ellerslie Racecourse to the Auckland Agricultural and Pastoral Association. In the 1880s, Buckland bought extensive lands around on the South Kaipara Head, where he established a cattle run. He was later President of the association in 1883 and 1886. Alfred died aged 77 on 12 June 1903. He was regarded as "highly esteemed" and in Wellington was reported as "the well-known auctioneer".

Buckland's land holdings grew to become the most extensive in Auckland Province, expanded from his initial farm at Mangere with holdings in One Tree Hill, Three Kings, the South Kaipara Head, Awhitu, and in the Waikato. Buckland was president of the Auckland Racing Club and formed the Pakuranga Hunt Club in 1872.
