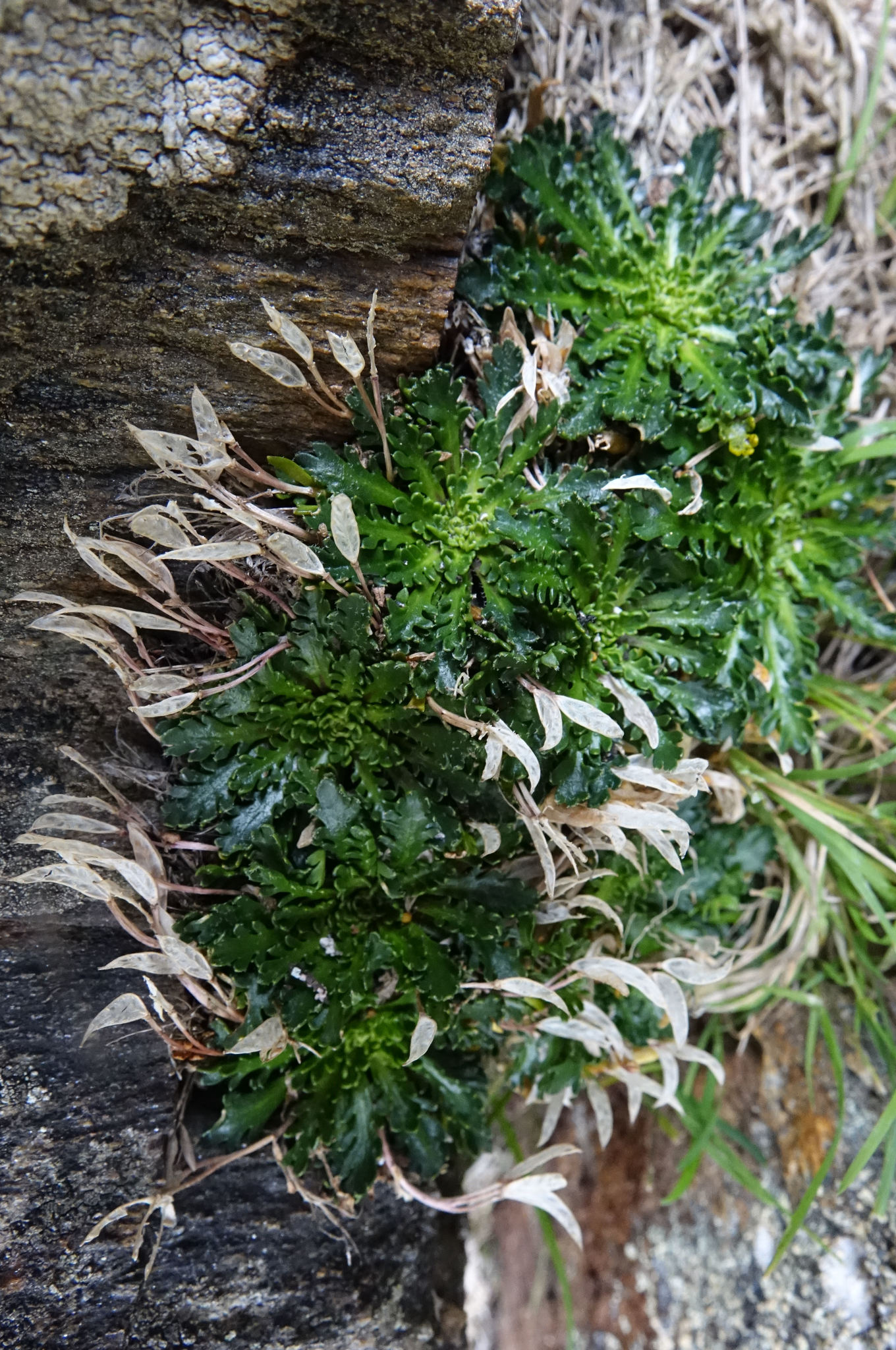
- Type species Pachycladon novae-zelandiae

Scientific classification
- Kingdom: Plantae
- Clade: Tracheophytes
- Clade: Angiosperms
- Clade: Eudicots
- Clade: Rosids
- Order: Brassicales
- Family: Brassicaceae
- Genus: Pachycladon; Hook.f.

Synonyms
- Cheesemania O.E.Schulz; Ischnocarpus O.E.Schulz

= Pachycladon =

Genus of flowering plants

Pachycladon (with synonyms Cheesemania and Ischnocarpus) is a genus of flowering plants of the family Brassicaceae, native to Tasmania and the South Island of New Zealand. It contains the following species:

- Pachycladon cheesemanii Heenan & A.D.Mitch.
- Pachycladon crenatum Philipson
- Pachycladon enysii (Cheeseman ex Kirk) Heenan & A.D.Mitch.
- Pachycladon exile (Heenan) Heenan & A.D.Mitch.
- Pachycladon fasciarium Heenan
- Pachycladon fastigiatum (Hook.f.) Heenan & A.D.Mitch.
- Pachycladon latesiliquum (Cheeseman) Heenan & A.D.Mitch.
- Pachycladon novae-zelandiae (Hook.f.) Hook.f.
- Pachycladon radicatum (Hook.f.) Heenan & A.D.Mitch.
- Pachycladon stellatum (Allan) Heenan & A.D.Mitch.
- Pachycladon wallii (Carse) Heenan & A.D.Mitch.

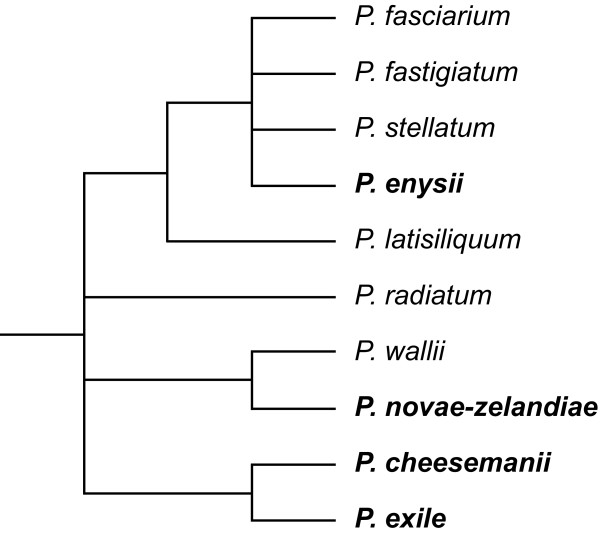
Phylogenetic relationships in Pachycladon
