= Joseph Newman (politician) =

New Zealand politician (1815–1892)

Joseph Newman (1815 – 4 January 1892) was a 19th-century Member of Parliament in the Waikato, New Zealand.

== Biography ==
Newman was born in Willoughby, Lincolnshire in 1815 to a small farmer of the same name. Mehetabel Newman was a younger sister. Another sister was Elizabeth Newman, who became the second wife of William Thomas Fairburn and died in childbirth in 1847. Newman received his education at the nearby Alford Grammar School and then worked in the flour milling and grain-buying business. He became a teetotaller as a young man. He applied to become a missionary for the London Missionary Society but was not chosen.

Newman came to New Zealand on the James in 1840, travelling in the company of several missionaries. He returned to England in 1845 to marry Caroline Ewen. Upon his return, he bought farming land at Kohimarama. From 1850, he worked as an auctioneer. He had a house, now Cotter House, built in Remuera in 1847 and rebuilt in 1862; it is an early Victorian-style house which is one of the oldest remaining houses still standing in Auckland. He had a business partnership with the landowner and auctioneer Alfred Buckland from 1855 to 1856. Afterwards, he had a business partnership with his brother-in-law, Walter Ewen.

New Zealand Parliament
Years	Term	Electorate	Party
1866–1867	4th	Raglan	Independent

Newman entered politics by being elected to the first Auckland Provincial Council for the Southern Division electorate, where he served from August 1853 to September 1855. In October 1863, he was elected unopposed to represent the Raglan electorate on the council, was again unopposed at the 1865 election and served until November 1868. From February to December 1864, he was appointed to the Auckland Executive Council. From 18 April 1864, he served as Deputy Superintendent, until he resigned in November of that year. The next Deputy Superintendent, Samuel Jackson, was appointed on 21 July 1865. In January 1865 Newman was appointed as commissioner for settlement of the 'waste lands' of Waikato after their invasion. He represented the Raglan electorate in Parliament from 1866 to 1867, when he resigned.

He died on 4 January 1892 at his Remuera residence, a bit over a year after sustaining serious injury from a falling signboard. Several obituaries and more modern sources say the board was a whisky advert and that he was struck down by drink, but it was more probably advertising biscuits. Newman was well known as a teetotaller. He was buried in St Andrew's, Epsom Anglican cemetery and was survived by his wife; they had no children.

== Notes ==
New Zealand Parliament
Preceded by William Buckland	Member of Parliament for Raglan; 1866–1867	Succeeded by James Farmer
