= Tumai =

- Settlement
- Location of Tumai in New Zealand
- Coordinates: 45°34′00″S 170°41′40″E
- Country: New Zealand
- Island: South Island
- Region: East Otago

Government
  - Regional council: Otago Regional Council
  - Territorial authority: Dunedin City Council
- Time zone: UTC+12 (NZST)
  - Summer (DST): UTC+13 (NZDT)
- Area code: 03
- Local iwi: Ngāi Tahu

Tumai is a rural locality in East Otago in the South Island of New Zealand. It is located on State Highway 1 between Waikouaiti and Palmerston, and close to the South Island Main Trunk railway, although trains no longer stop at Tumai. It is close to the northernmost coastal part of Dunedin city.

A small creek runs close to Tumai, flowing north into the estuary of the Pleasant River. There is evidence of Māori settlement in the area dating to at least the 15th century AD, notably the midden from a small settlement close to the southern edge of the Pleasant River estuary. The site was extensively excavated in 1976, and has a Heritage New Zealand Category II historic place classification.
