= Rachel Buckland =

New Zealand artist (1873–1946)

Rachel Susan Christabel Buckland (1873 in Waikouaiti, Otago, New Zealand – 1946) was a New Zealand artist. Her watercolour paintings are included in the collection of Hocken Library.

Her father was the politician John Buckland. She attended a private school in Dunedin where she met and became friends with Fanny Wimperis. The pair painted together in Dunedin and the surrounding countryside. In about 1893 the family moved to Taieri Lake Station and Buckland continued to paint watercolours there.

== Personal life ==
In 1901, she married a farmer, Lionel Orbell in Winchester. The couple lived at Geraldine for some years, then moved to Fairfield Farm at Pukeuri. One of their children, Geoffrey Orbell, was a noted naturalist.
