= Elizabeth Colenso =

New Zealand missionary and translator (1821–1904)

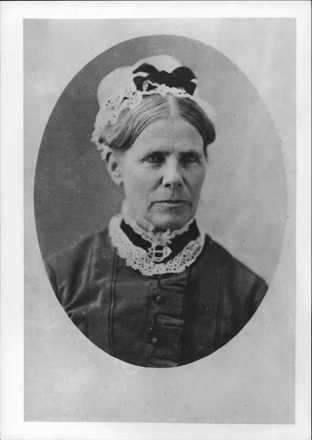
- Born: Elizabeth Fairburn; 29 August 1821; Kerikeri, New Zealand
- Died: 2 September 1904 (aged 83); Forest Lakes, Ōtaki, New Zealand
- Other name: Elizabeth Fairburn Colenso
- Occupation: Missionary
- Spouse: William Colenso

Elizabeth Colenso (née Fairburn; 29 August 1821 – 2 September 1904) was a missionary, teacher and Bible translator in New Zealand.

== Early life ==
Elizabeth Fairburn was born at the Church Missionary Society (CMS) station at Kerikeri, New Zealand, in 1821. She was the daughter of Sarah Tuckwell and her husband, William Fairburn.

In 1834 William Fairburn and his wife opened a mission station at Puriri in the Thames district. Their five children, Richard (aged 15), Elizabeth (13), John (11), Edwin (7), and Esther (5), remained at Paihia where they attended the CMS school conducted by Marianne Williams.

== Life with Colenso ==
Elizabeth became fluent in Māori, and in 1840, aged 19 years, was teaching Māori children and young people at her father's mission station at Maraetai. When Bishop Selwyn visited the mission, he engaged Elizabeth to teach at St. John's College, which was then at the Waimate Mission. Here she met missionary and printer William Colenso. The pair married on 27 April 1843. Following Colenso's ordination as a deacon in September 1844 the couple, with their infant daughter Frances Mary (Fanny), established the Waitangi Mission at Ahuriri, Napier. In September 1845 Elizabeth went overland to the Rev. William Williams' mission station at Tūranga, Poverty Bay for the birth of her son Ridley Latimer (Latty).

After several unhappy years of marriage, Elizabeth became aware that William was the father of Wiremu, a child born in 1850 to Ripeka Meretene, a member of the household. In November 1851 her husband was suspended as a deacon, and in 1852 was dismissed from the mission as the consequence of his adultery. Only after William's adultery became public knowledge in 1853 did the couple separate, though they never divorced. After her separation the CMS engaged Elizabeth to work as a teacher at the Kaitotehe Mission near Mount Taupiri in the Waikato.

== To England ==
In 1860 the First Taranaki War broke out and the mission stations in the vicinity of the fighting were abandoned. Elizabeth took her two children, Fanny (17), and Latty (15), to England to finish their education, and settled in Tottenham, north London. In 1863, Hariata and Hare Pomare, members of a tour party of Māori organised by Wesleyan lay preacher William Jenkins, stayed with the Colensos. On 26 October 1863 Hariata gave birth to Albert Victor, who was named after the Queen's deceased husband. On 4 December 1863 Elizabeth accompanied Hariata and Hare Pomare as interpreter on a visit to Queen Victoria.

Having grown up speaking the Māori language from a young age, Colenso helped oversee the publication in England of a Māori language edition of the Old Testament, a lengthy undertaking which continued until the mid-1860s. She also helped prepare the revised New Testament for press, correcting the printed copy, and sometimes suggesting alternative translations.

== Later life in New Zealand and the Pacific ==
Latty entered St John's College, Cambridge in 1866, and Elizabeth and Fanny left England in October of that year, returning to Auckland by early 1867. In 1869 Elizabeth started a school for Māori children at the mission house at Paihia and kept it going until the end of 1875.

At this time, Elizabeth travelled to Norfolk Island to help in the work of the Melanesian Mission, at the request of Bishop John Selwyn. Here, she translated Christian materials into the Mota language, which was chosen as the 'lingua franca' of the Mission.

In 1879 Colenso visited New Zealand and travelled to Ōtaki to see her daughter Fanny and son-in-law, William H. Simcox. In 1891 Elizabeth again visited New Zealand; this visit also included a visit to her family in Ōtaki. In January 1895 Fanny moved to Norfolk Island.

Elizabeth retired from mission life in 1898, at the age of 76, by which time she was suffering increasing pain from rheumatism. She lived to the age of 83, dying on 2 September 1904 at Forest Lakes, Ōtaki.
