= Bessie Hocken =

New Zealand artist and translator (1848–1933)

Elizabeth Mary Hocken
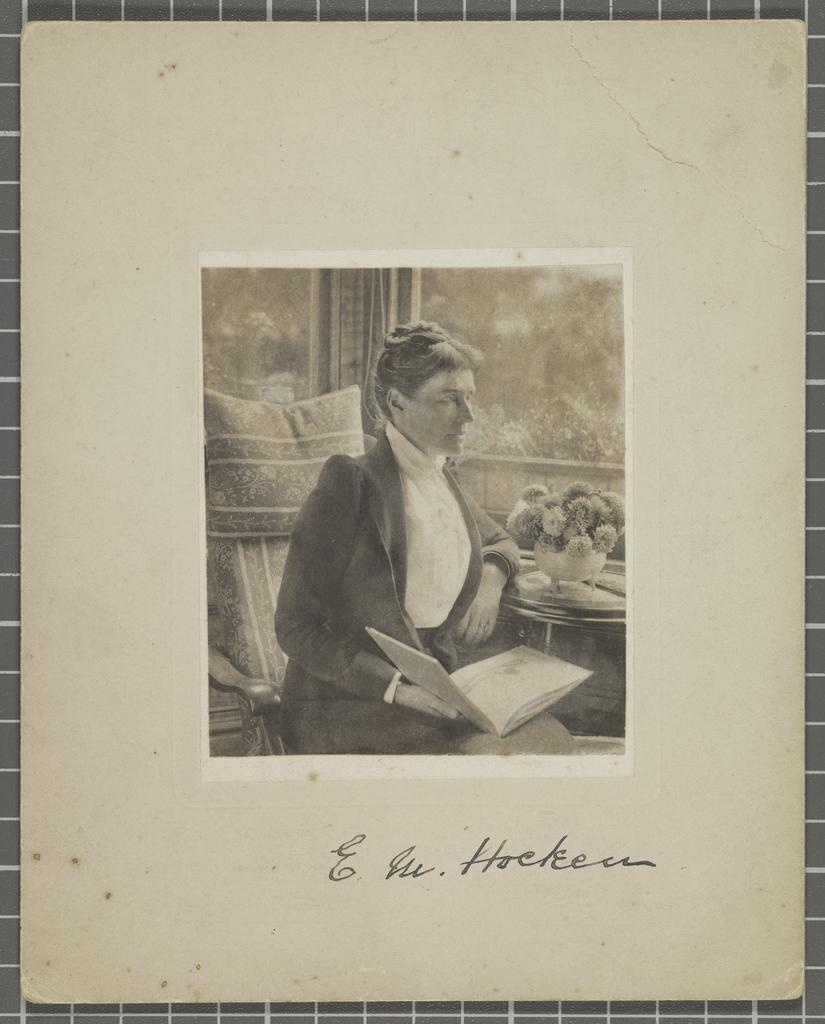
- Born: 25 October 1848; Auckland, New Zealand
- Died: 19 April 1933 (aged 84); Rondebosch, Cape Town, South Africa

Elizabeth Mary Hocken (née Buckland; 25 October 1848 – 19 April 1933), was a New Zealand artist and translator. She was known as Bessie.

== Biography ==
Hocken was born in Auckland on 25 October 1848 to merchants William Buckland and Susan (née Channing). On 24 July 1883, she married Dunedin-based doctor Thomas Hocken at Invercargill's St John's Church. Her husband was a keen collector of documents describing early European settlement in New Zealand, and Hocken used her skills in painting (oils and water-colours), photography and translation to assist him in recording and illustrating his historical work. She painted original works and also copied historical works from private collections to add to those acquired by her husband. Hocken also helped her husband translate the text of Abel Tasman’s 1642 voyage from Dutch to English.

Hocken was awarded a prize for flower painting at the New Zealand and South Seas Exhibition in Dunedin in 1889–90, and exhibited with the Otago Art Society from 1887 to 1914.

She was one of the first women to join the Dunedin Photographic Society in April 1892.

Her brothers were politicians Frank Buckland and John Buckland and her niece was photographer Jessie Buckland.

Hocken died in Johannesburg, South Africa on 19 April 1933.
