= Frank Lawry =

New Zealand politician

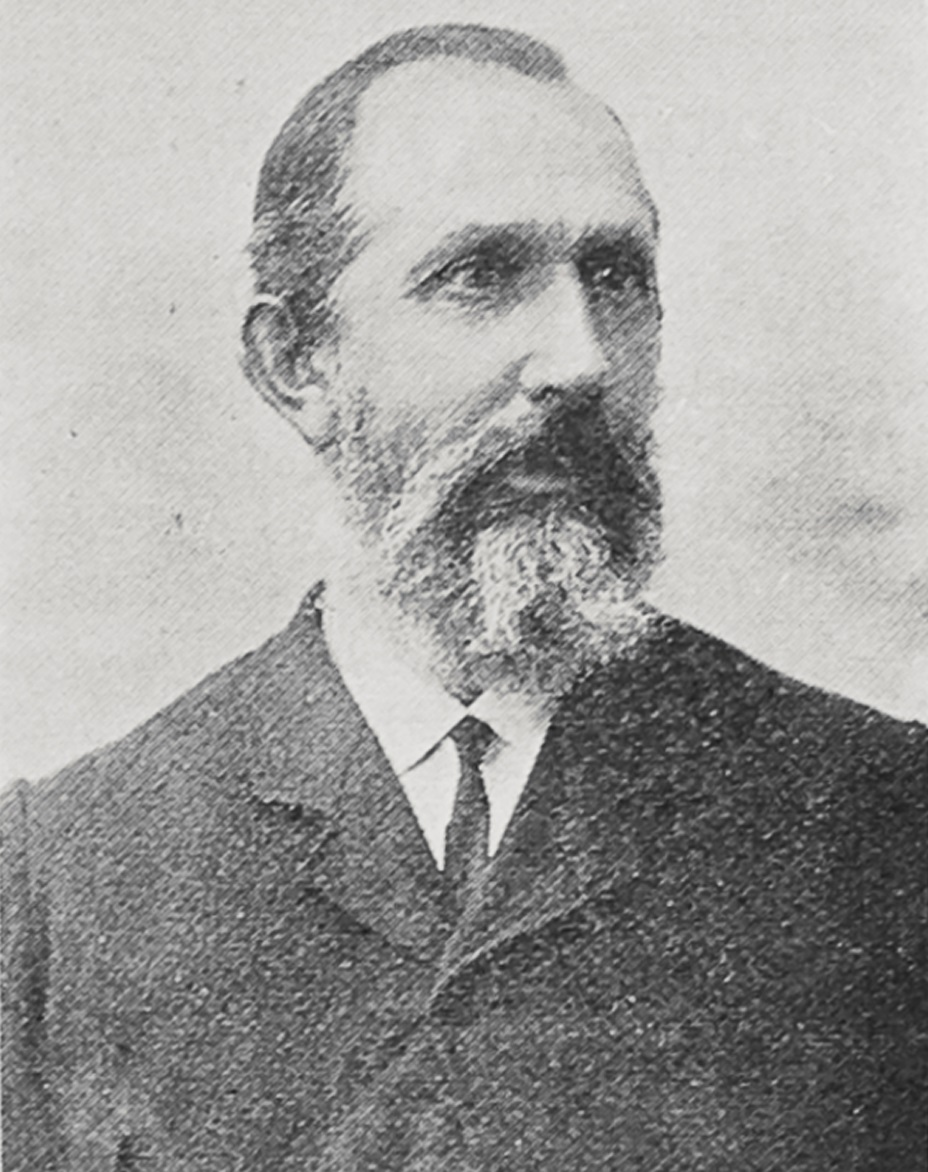

Member of the New Zealand Parliament for Parnell
- In office 1890–1911
- Preceded by: Frederick Moss
- Succeeded by: James Dickson

Member of the New Zealand Parliament for Franklin North
- In office 1887–1890
- Preceded by: Frank Buckland
- Succeeded by: Constituency abolished

Personal details
- Born: 1839 Bleadon, Somerset, England
- Died: 19 January 1921 (aged 81) Auckland, New Zealand
- Party: Liberal
- Spouse: Sarah Davies (m. 1868)

Francis Lawry (1839 – 19 January 1921) was a conservative then Liberal Party Member of Parliament in New Zealand.

== Biography ==
=== Early life ===
Lawry was born in Bleadon, Somerset, England, in 1839, the son of William Lawry, a farmer and Methodist minister. He was educated at the British school at Weston-super-Mare, and then entered a career in farming. Lawry emigrated to New Zealand in 1863 aboard the ship Ulcoates. At Epsom on 21 October 1868 he married Sarah Davies. The couple went on to have one daughter.

Lawry entered public life as a member of the North Auckland Cattle Boards and was later president of the Auckland Agricultural and Pastoral Association. He was the chairman of the Epsom Road Board for thirteen consecutive years and spent two years as a member of the Board of Education. He was also a Freemason.

=== Political career ===
New Zealand Parliament
Years	Term	Electorate	Party
1887–1890	10th	Franklin North	Independent
1890–1891	11th	Parnell	Independent
1891–1893	Changed allegiance to:		Liberal
1893–1896	12th	Parnell	Liberal
1896–1899	13th	Parnell	Liberal
1899–1902	14th	Parnell	Liberal
1902–1905	15th	Parnell	Liberal
1905–1908	16th	Parnell	Liberal
1908–1911	17th	Parnell	Liberal

In the 1881 general election he contested the Franklin South electorate. He was beaten by Ebenezer Hamlin, by the mere majority of 40 votes. In 1884 he stood against Maurice O'Rorke in Manukau, but was again defeated by 127 votes. He won the Franklin North electorate in 1887, and then the Parnell electorate in 1890 which he represented until he retired in 1911.

In the 1890 election, he was listed as a supporter of the conservative Atkinson Ministry, led by Harry Atkinson. Following the election, he did change his allegiance to the Liberal Party and became Senior Whip for the Liberal Government from 1891 until his resignation from the role on 29 October 1894.

Throughout his long Parliamentary career he was a member of many committees, chiefly the Agricultural and Pastoral Committee, which for several years he was its chairman.

=== Death ===
Lawry died in Auckland in 1921, and was buried at St Matthias' Church, Panmure.

== Notes ==
New Zealand Parliament
Preceded by Frank Buckland	Member of Parliament for Franklin North; 1887–1890	Constituency abolished
Preceded by Frederick Moss	Member of Parliament for Parnell; 1890–1911	Succeeded by James Dickson
Party political offices
Preceded by Westby Perceval	Senior Whip of the Liberal Party; 1891–1894	Succeeded by Charles H. Mills
