= Electoral history of William Massey =

List of elections featuring William Massey as a candidate

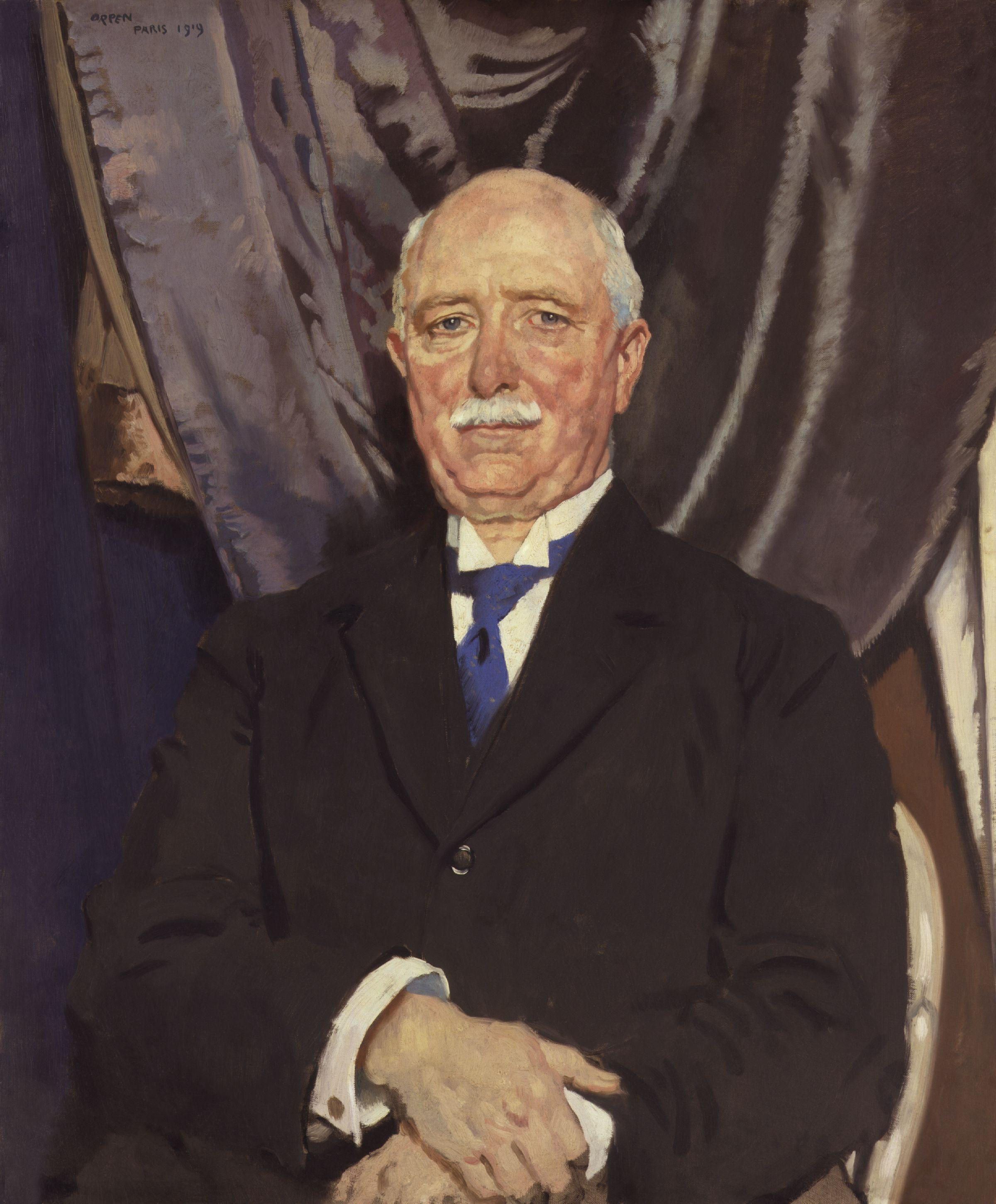
Portrait of Massey by Sir William Orpen

This is a summary of the electoral history of William Massey, Prime Minister of New Zealand, (1912–1925). He represented two electorates during his political career.

== Parliamentary elections ==
=== 1893 election ===
General election, 1893: Franklin
Party	Candidate	Votes	%	±%
Liberal	Benjamin Harris	1,684	51.36	+3.21
Conservative	William Massey	1,595	48.64	
Majority		89	2.71	
Turnout		3,279	79.55	+18.16
Registered electors		4,122		

=== 1894 by-election ===
1894 Waitemata by-election
Party	Candidate	Votes	%	±%
Conservative	William Massey	1,619	52.82	
Independent Liberal	Jackson Palmer	1,446	47.17	
Majority		173	5.64	
Turnout		3,065		

=== 1896 election ===
General election, 1896: Franklin
Party	Candidate	Votes	%	±%
Conservative	William Massey	2,184	55.76	+7.12
Liberal	Benjamin Harris	1,710	43.66	−7.70
Informal votes		23	0.58	
Majority		474	12.10	
Turnout		3,917		

=== 1899 election ===
General election, 1899: Franklin
Party	Candidate	Votes	%	±%
Conservative	William Massey	2,458	65.79	−10.03
Liberal	W Findlay Wilson	1,278	34.21	
Majority		1,180	31.58	−19.48
Turnout		3,736	77.90	
Registered electors		4,796		

=== 1902 election ===
General election, 1902: Franklin
Party	Candidate	Votes	%	±%
Conservative	William Massey	2,297	66.87	+1.08
Liberal	Alfred Richard Harris	1,121	32.63	
Informal votes		17	0.49	
Majority		1,176	34.23	+2.65
Turnout		3,435	70.81	−7.09
Registered electors		4,851		

=== 1905 election ===
General election, 1905: Franklin
Party	Candidate	Votes	%	±%
Conservative	William Massey	3,120	57.58	−9.29
Liberal	William Wilson McCardle	2,165	39.95	
Informal votes		133	2.45	+1.96
Majority		955	17.62	−16.61
Turnout		5,418	85.91	+15.10
Registered electors		6,306		

=== 1908 election ===
General election, 1908: Franklin
Party	Candidate	Votes	%	±%
Conservative	William Massey	2,781	62.62	+5.04
Liberal	John McLarin	1,594	35.89	
Informal votes		66	1.48	−0.97
Majority		1,187	26.72	−9.10
Turnout		4,441	78.43	−7.48
Registered electors		5,662		

=== 1911 election ===
General election, 1911: Franklin
Party	Candidate	Votes	%	±%
Reform	William Massey	3,779	66.99	−4.37
Liberal	John McLarin	1,816	32.20	−3.69
Informal votes		46	0.81	−0.67
Majority		1,963	34.79	+8.07
Turnout		5,641	80.47	+2.04
Registered electors		7,010		

=== 1914 election ===
General election, 1914: Franklin
Party	Candidate	Votes	%	±%
Reform	William Massey	4,818	71.82	+4.83
Liberal	Arthur Glass	1,890	28.17	
Informal votes		68	1.01	+0.30
Majority		2,928	43.64	−8.85
Turnout		6,708	84.34	+3.87
Registered electors		7,953		

=== 1919 election ===
General election, 1919: Franklin
Party	Candidate	Votes	%	±%
Reform	William Massey	4,195	68.42	−3.40
Liberal	Joseph Rea	1,165	19.02	
Labour	Ernest Piggott	637	10.38	
Informal votes		134	2.18	+1.17
Majority		3,030	49.42	+5.78
Turnout		6,131	85.33	+0.99
Registered electors		7,185		

=== 1922 election ===
General election, 1922: Franklin
Party	Candidate	Votes	%	±%
Reform	William Massey	5,276	66.70	−1.72
Liberal	Joseph Rea	2,526	31.94	+12.92
Informal votes		108	1.36	+0.82
Majority		2,750	34.76	−14.66
Turnout		7,910	88.73	−3.40
Registered electors		8,914		
