= 1878 Franklin by-election =

New Zealand by-election

The 1874 Franklin by-election was a by-election held on 20 May 1878 in the Franklin electorate during the 6th New Zealand Parliament.

The by-election was caused by the resignation of the incumbent MP Hugh Lusk on 16 April 1878.

At the nomination meeting, Richard Hobbs of Pokeno was put forward. As there were no other nominations, he was declared duly elected.
