= Joseph May (politician) =

New Zealand politician (1816–1890)

New Zealand Parliament
Years	Term	Electorate	Party
1874–1875	5th	Franklin	Independent

Joseph May (1816 – 10 February 1890) was a 19th-century Member of Parliament from the Auckland Region in New Zealand.

May was first elected to Auckland Provincial Council for the Mongonui electorate in October 1855, where he served until August 1857. He then represented the Southern Division electorate from November 1859 to September 1861. He then stood in the Raglan electorate and represented it from November 1861 to April 1864, and again from November 1865 to October 1867, and for a third period from December 1869 to October 1873. From October 1874 until the abolition of provincial government on 31 October 1876, he represented the Eden electorate.

From January to November 1856, he was a member of the Auckland Executive Council. He was again appointed to the Executive Council in December 1862, and he served until he and fellow executive councillor William Daldy were on 8 April 1864 replaced by John Anderson Gilfillan and Samuel Jackson. May was appointed to the Executive Council for a third period from December 1869 to December 1870. From June 1870, he was the 7th and last Deputy-Superintendent of Auckland Province.

He represented the Franklin electorate in Parliament from 9 April 1874 to 6 December 1875, when he was defeated.

He died in Mt Roskill, Auckland aged 75.

== Notes ==
New Zealand Parliament
Preceded by Archibald Clark	Member of Parliament for Franklin; 1874–1876; Served alongside: William Buckland	Succeeded by Hugh Lusk, Ebenezer Hamlin
