= 1925 Franklin by-election =

New Zealand by-election

The Franklin by-election of 1925 was a by-election during the 21st New Zealand Parliament. The seat became vacant due to the death of the sitting Member, William Massey. It was held on 17 June 1925. Two candidates contested the seat:

Previous general election result

1922 general election: Franklin
Party	Candidate	Votes	%	±%
Reform	William Massey	5,276	66.70	−1.72
Liberal	Joseph Rea	2,526	31.94	+12.92
Informal votes		108	1.36	+0.82
Majority		2,750	34.76	−14.66
Turnout		7,910	88.73	−3.40
Registered electors		8,914		

By-election result

1925 Franklin by-election
Party	Candidate	Votes	%	±%
Reform	Ewen McLennan	6,056	72.96	
Labour	John Sommerville Montgomerie	2,245	27.04	
Informal votes		43	0.5	
Majority		3,811	45.91	
Turnout		8,344		
Reform hold		Swing		
