= Bill Birch =

New Zealand politician (1934–2026)

The Right Honourable Sir Bill Birch GNZM
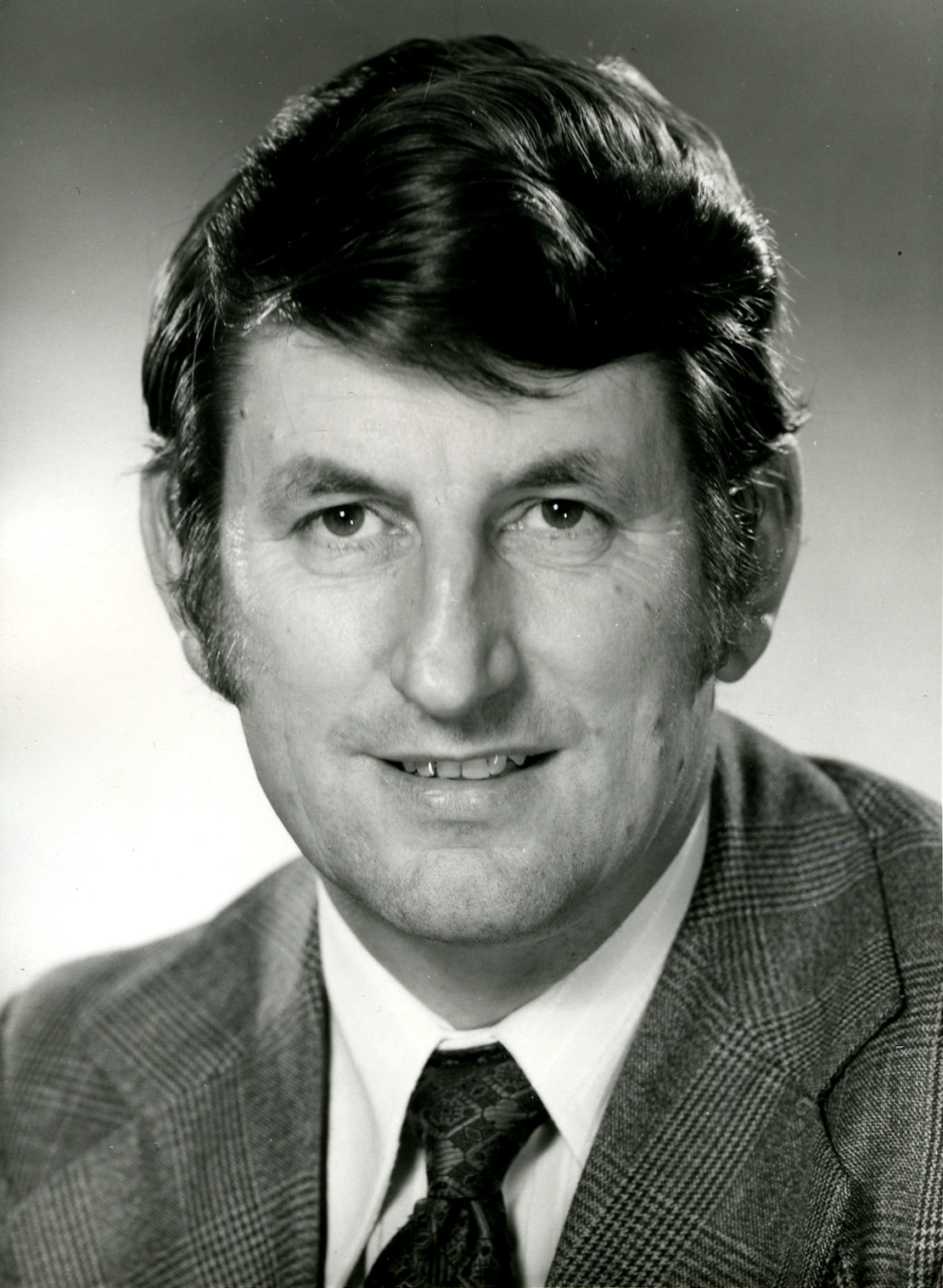
- Birch c. 1980s

38th Minister of Finance
- In office 22 June 1999 – 10 December 1999
- Prime Minister: Jenny Shipley
- Preceded by: Bill English
- Succeeded by: Michael Cullen
- In office 29 November 1993 – 31 January 1999
- Prime Minister: Jim Bolger; Jenny Shipley
- Preceded by: Ruth Richardson
- Succeeded by: Bill English

2nd Treasurer of New Zealand
- In office 14 August 1998 – 22 June 1999
- Prime Minister: Jenny Shipley
- Preceded by: Winston Peters
- Succeeded by: Bill English

31st Minister of Health
- In office 27 March 1993 – 29 November 1993
- Prime Minister: Jim Bolger
- Preceded by: Simon Upton
- Succeeded by: Jenny Shipley

30th Minister of Labour
- In office 2 November 1990 – 27 March 1993
- Prime Minister: Jim Bolger
- Preceded by: Helen Clark
- Succeeded by: Maurice McTigue

4th Minister of Energy
- In office 13 December 1978 – 26 July 1984
- Prime Minister: Robert Muldoon
- Preceded by: George Gair
- Succeeded by: Bob Tizard

Member of the New Zealand Parliament
- In office 25 November 1972 – 27 November 1999
- Preceded by: Alf Allen
- Succeeded by: Paul Hutchison
- Constituency: See list: Franklin (1972–78, 1984–87, 1993–96); Rangiriri (1978–84); Maramarua (1987–93); Port Waikato (1996–99)

Personal details
- Born: 9 April 1934 Hastings, New Zealand
- Died: 17 July 2026 (aged 92)
- Party: National
- Spouse: Alice Rosa Mitchell (m. 1953; died 2015)
- Children: 4
- Profession: Surveyor

Sir William Francis Birch GNZM PC (9 April 1934 – 17 July 2026) was a New Zealand politician. He served as Minister of Finance from 1993 to 1999 in the fourth National Government.

== Early life ==
Birch was born in Hastings on 9 April 1934, the son of Charles and Elizabeth Birch. He was educated at Hamilton's Technical High School and through Wellington Technical Correspondence School. He was trained as a surveyor, and established a business in Pukekohe, a small town south of Auckland. Birch quickly became involved in various Pukekohe community organisations. He served on Pukehohe's borough council from 1965 to 1974, and was deputy mayor from 1968 to 1974.

In 1953, Birch married Rosa Mitchell, and the couple went on to have four children.

== Member of Parliament ==
New Zealand Parliament
Years	Term	Electorate	List	Party
1972–1975	37th	Franklin		National
1975–1978	38th	Franklin		National
1978–1981	39th	Rangiriri		National
1981–1984	40th	Rangiriri		National
1984–1987	41st	Franklin		National
1987–1990	42nd	Maramarua		National
1990–1993	43rd	Maramarua		National
1993–1996	44th	Franklin		National
1996–1999	45th	Port Waikato	3	National

Birch first entered parliament in the 1972 election and would remain an MP for the next twenty-seven years.

At first, Birch stood in Franklin, succeeding the retiring National Party MP and Speaker of the New Zealand House of Representatives Alf Allen. The seat had once been held by Prime Minister William Massey. Its name and shape changed regularly as required by post-New Zealand census boundary adjustments. Over Birch's career, the extreme borders of his electorate sometimes extended as far as north as Beachlands, as far south-west as Pirongia Mountain and as far east as Thames (though never all at once). However, no matter the name, Birch's electorate always included the town of Pukekohe.

After his retirement in 1999, he was succeeded by Paul Hutchison as MP for Port Waikato.

=== Third National Government, 1975–1984 ===
Birch's initial term of Parliament was in Opposition, but under leader and finance spokesperson Robert Muldoon, the National Party won the following three elections and formed the Third National Government. After holding a number of internal National Party positions in his first six years as an MP, including senior whip from 1976 to 1979, Birch was made Minister of National Development, Minister of Energy, and Minister of Science and Technology when National won its second term in government at the 1978 election.

As a minister in the Third National Government, Birch supported the Government's dawn raids against overstayers, which disproportionately targeted the Pasifika community. In response, the Polynesian Panthers activist group staged "counter raids" on the homes of Birch and the Minister of Immigration Frank Gill, surrounding them with light and chanting with megaphones. As Minister of Energy during the 1979 oil crisis, Birch oversaw the introduction of temporary petrol demand reduction measures including carless days and the ban on petrol sales during weekends.

After the 1981 election, he swapped the Science and Technology role for the Regional Development portfolio. As Minister for National Development, Birch was closely involved in the Think Big project, a series of high-cost programmes designed to reduce New Zealand's dependence on imported fuel. When National lost the 1984 election, Birch's ministerial career was interrupted, but he remained in parliament.

=== Opposition, 1984–1990 ===
Muldoon kept Birch on in the Energy and National Development portfolios when he announced his shadow cabinet in July 1984. He then was one of four ex-ministers who challenged Muldoon for the leadership of the party which resulted in Jim McLay becoming leader. McLay promoted Birch to replace Muldoon in the finance portfolio and third rank in the party caucus. McLay later dumped Birch as finance spokesman in an attempt to "rejuvenate" the party and instead allocated him the job of spokesperson for Labour and Employment and the twelfth rank. This motivated Birch to support a successful challenge to McLay a month later. Under new leader Jim Bolger, Birch returned to his position as third-ranked in caucus and retained the Labour and Employment portfolios. In the second opposition term, from 1987 to 1990, he was additionally the spokesperson for immigration and state services.

=== Fourth National Government, 1990–1996 ===
After National regained power in the 1990 election, Birch re-entered cabinet as part of the fourth National government. Over the next three years, he was to hold a number of ministerial roles, including Minister of Labour, Minister of Immigration, Minister of Pacific Island Affairs, Minister of Employment, Minister of Health, Minister of State Services, and Minister responsible for the ACC.

The first term of the National government was often fraught, and Birch clashed a number of times with the controversial Minister of Finance, Ruth Richardson. The Prime Minister, Jim Bolger, had never been a supporter of Richardson's strong laissez-faire policies, and preferred the more conservative Birch for the Finance portfolio.

==== Minister of Labour ====
National had foreshadowed labour market reform in the 1990 manifesto, though it was vague on details. Birch drew on advice from the Business Roundtable and Employers Federation to help draft a new industrial relations statute that would diminish the power of the New Zealand union movement. Richardson interfered in his Labour portfolio by submitting her own draft before Birch, as she did not believe the draft went far enough. Birch eventually prevailed.

The Employment Contracts Act became law despite nationwide protests to "kill the bill". It radically reshaped New Zealand’s industrial relations system, going far beyond anything attempted in any Western country at the time. Industrial awards were abolished and replaced by individual and collective employment contracts. Unions were reduced to the status of "bargaining agents", making organising extremely difficult. Award minimums, such as overtime and penalty rates of pay, had no statutory basis. Unions were also forced to re-register as incorporated societies, as the Act did not afford them any legal recognition. Birch later described the legislation as "balanced", a view not shared by labour market experts at the time or by the International Labour Organization.

In 1992, Birch was made a member of the Privy Council of the United Kingdom, an honour formerly reserved for senior New Zealand politicians.

==== Minister of Health ====
In early 1993, Bolger appointed Bill Birch Minister of Health to manage a deeply unpopular series of health reforms championed by his predecessor Simon Upton. One of his first acts in this portfolio was to abolish the $50 overnight hospital charges introduced in the 1991 budget, which had caused an uproar.

While he had rolled back user charges, Birch ensured the passage of the Health and Disability Services Act 1993. Area Health Boards, which had been established in 1983, were abolished. In their place, 23 Crown Health Enterprises (CHE's) were created. The funder and provider systems of the health system were split with the formation of Regional Health Authorities (RHAs). This closely reflected the 1988 Gibbs report, which urged the creation of an internal market to impose competitive disciplines within the health system. Due to political constrains however, all CHEs quickly reported chronic deficits, as they were not able to recover costs as competitive enterprises from patients. His successor in the portfolio, Jenny Shipley, continued the reforms until the 1996 election. By 1997, the health reforms had effectively been abandoned.

==== Minister of Finance ====
The price of reform cost National dearly at the 1993 election, and the government came close perilously to losing. Polls projecting National would win a comfortable majority were proven spectacularly wrong on election night and only special votes allowed National to claim a working majority. Bolger believed that the public had sent a clear verdict on Richardson as Finance Minister, demoting her. Bolger appointed his original preference, Bill Birch, as Finance Minister. His first task was passing the Fiscal Responsibility Act, which he worked closely with his predecessor on drafting.

Birch's appointment to the Finance portfolio raised eyebrows, given Birch's association with the Think Big projects. However, he soon developed a reputation for a frugal finance minister, delivering a succession of balanced budgets. In 1995, Birch completed the privatisation of the New Zealand Forestry Corporation and sold Radio New Zealand's commercial arm. In early 1996, the Ministry of Works was split, sold, and dissolved. Despite this, Birch largely reflected his pragmatic conservative background, with little expansion of the economic reform agenda which had nearly cost National the treasury benches in 1993.

Economic prospects for New Zealand improved in the mid-1990s as unemployment fell from 10.7% in 1991/1992 to 6.5% by 1996. The recovery, however, was uneven. While Birch significantly increased Family Support payments in the 1994 budget, this only applied to low and middle-income New Zealanders in paid employment and hardship remained high. Spending on core services, such as health and education, also increased. The health spend rose by an average of 6% over the 1995 to 1999 period.

=== National-New Zealand First Coalition Government, 1996–1999 ===
==== Treasurer ====
After the 1996 election, National needed to form a coalition with the New Zealand First party in order to govern. New Zealand First's leader, Winston Peters, insisted on control of the Finance role as part of the coalition agreement, and National eventually agreed. The Minister of Finance role was split into two separate offices. The senior position was given the title "Treasurer" and was assigned to Peters; Birch retained the title of Minister of Finance and its remaining responsibilities. Some, however, have voiced the opinion that whatever the official arrangement may have been, Birch still performed most of the job's key functions. Mike Moore of the Labour Party commented that "we are always impressed when Winston Peters answers questions, because Bill Birch's lips do not move."

During the compilation of the coalition agreement between National and New Zealand First, Birch added the proviso to almost every page that "All funding proposals subject to being considered within the agreed spending policy parameters" which essentially rendered every policy agreement provisional, much to Peters' annoyance. When the coalition with New Zealand First broke down, Birch took over the role of Treasurer. For a short period he held both financial offices until Bill English was promoted to be Minister of Finance, leaving Birch with the senior role. In the middle of 1999, as part of the preparations for Birch's planned retirement, Birch and English were swapped. English became the Treasurer and Birch served once again as Minister of Finance.

== Retirement and death ==
Birch retired from Parliament at the 1999 general election. His wife, Rosa, Lady Birch, died in Pukekohe on 22 June 2015.

In 2020 his biography, Bill Birch: Minister of Everything, written by Brad Tattersfield, was published. Birch died on 17 July 2026, at the age of 92.

== Honours and awards ==
Birch was awarded the Queen Elizabeth II Silver Jubilee Medal in 1977, and the New Zealand 1990 Commemoration Medal in 1990. In the 1999 Queen's Birthday Honours, he was appointed a Knight Grand Companion of the New Zealand Order of Merit, for public services as a Member of Parliament and Minister of the Crown.

== Notes ==
New Zealand Parliament
Preceded by Alf Allen	Member of Parliament for Franklin; 1972–1978; 1984–1987; 1993–1996	Constituency abolished
New constituency	Member of Parliament for Rangiriri; 1978–1984	Constituency abolished
New constituency	Member of Parliament for Maramarua; 1987–1993	Constituency abolished
New constituency	Member of Parliament for Port Waikato; 1996–1999	Succeeded by Paul Hutchison
Political offices
Preceded by George Gair	Minister of Energy; 1978–1984	Succeeded by Bob Tizard
Preceded by Helen Clark	Minister of Labour; 1990–1993	Succeeded by Maurice McTigue
Preceded by Simon Upton	Minister of Health; 1993	Succeeded by Jenny Shipley
Preceded by Ruth Richardson	Minister of Finance; 1993–1999; 1999	Succeeded by Bill English
Preceded by Bill English	Minister of Finance; 1993–1999; 1999	Succeeded by Michael Cullen
Preceded by Winston Peters	Treasurer; 1998–1999	Succeeded by Bill English
