= Frank Buckland (politician) =

New Zealand politician

New Zealand Parliament
Years	Term	Electorate	Party
1884–1887	9th	Franklin North	Independent
1890–1893	11th	Manukau	Independent

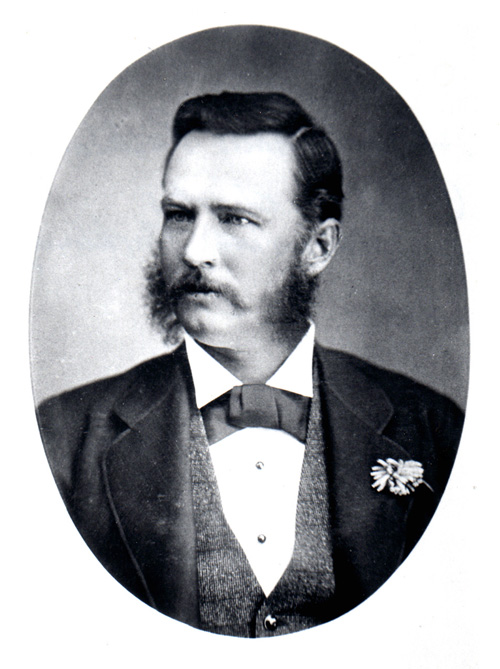
W. F. Buckland

William Francis Buckland (8 August 1847 – 29 December 1915) was a 19th-century Member of Parliament in New Zealand, an independent conservative MP and cricketer.

== Life and career ==
Buckland was born in Auckland in 1847, a son of William Buckland. John Buckland was an elder brother. Frank Buckland received private tuition, and attended Parnell Grammar School and St John's College. He trained as a civil engineer and was employed by the engineer's department of the Auckland Provincial Council, before joining the Colonial Survey as a surveyor. He then became mine manager in Thames. He also trained in law and was called to the bar in 1884.

Buckland held various public offices in Remuera between 1873 and 1880. Buckland was one of four candidates who contested the Franklin North electorate in the 1881 election. He was beaten by Captain Benjamin Harris, who had since 1879 been one of the two members of the Franklin electorate, by just two votes. Early in 1882, Buckland petitioned to the courts against the election on various grounds. The case was heard by the Chief Justice, James Prendergast, and Justice Gillies, who declared the election void. Buckland and Harris contested the resulting 1882 by-election, which was won by Harris by 529 votes to 499. In the 1884 election, Buckland defeated Harris in Franklin North. In the 1887 election, Buckland was defeated by the liberal politician Frank Lawry. Buckland then represented the Manukau electorate from 1890, when he defeated long-term MP Maurice O'Rorke. In 1893, O'Rorke defeated him in turn. He again contested the Manukau electorate in the 1896 election, but could not beat the incumbent, Sir Maurice O'Rorke. He tried again in 1899, when four candidates contested the electorate, but O'Rorke remained successful.

He was mayor of Cambridge 1898–1903 and 1905–1910. He practised law in Cambridge.

Buckland also played seven first-class cricket matches for Auckland between 1873 and 1883. In 1873 he organised the first tour by a New Zealand provincial team, when over three weeks in November and December Auckland played in Dunedin, Christchurch, Wellington and Nelson, winning all four matches. At the time he was described as a batsman with "a true eye and capital nerve" and a destructive fast bowler with "good lasting powers".

He died on 29 December 1915 at his son's house "Mona Vale" in Cambridge. His wife had died before him.

== See also ==
- List of Auckland representative cricketers

New Zealand Parliament
Preceded by Benjamin Harris	Member of Parliament for Franklin North; 1884–1887	Succeeded by Frank Lawry
Preceded by Maurice O'Rorke	Member of Parliament for Manukau; 1890–1893	Succeeded by Maurice O'Rorke
