= 1868 Franklin by-election =

New Zealand by-election

The 1868 Franklin by-election was a by-election held on 2 July 1868 in the Franklin electorate during the 4th New Zealand Parliament.

The by-election was caused by the resignation of the incumbent MP Robert Graham on 25 May 1868.

The by-election was won by William Turnbull Swan.

== Results ==
1868 Franklin by-election
Party	Candidate	Votes	%	±%
Independent	William Turnbull Swan	619	53.04	
Independent	William Buckland	548	46.96	
Turnout		1167		
Majority		71	6.08	
