= Ewen McLennan =

New Zealand politician

Member of the New Zealand Parliament for Franklin
- In office 1931–1928
- Preceded by: William Massey
- Succeeded by: Jack Massey

Personal details
- Born: Ewen Donald McLennan; 3 August 1861; New Zealand
- Died: 14 December 1948 (aged 87); Papakura, Auckland, New Zealand
- Resting place: Papakura Cemetery
- Political party: Reform
- Spouse: Janet McCullough (m. 1895)

Ewen Donald McLennan (3 August 1861 – 14 December 1948) was a Reform Party Member of Parliament.

New Zealand Parliament
Years	Term	Electorate	Party
1925	21st	Franklin	Reform
1925–1928	22nd	Franklin	Reform

He won the Franklin electorate in a 1925 by-election after the death of the previous MP, Prime Minister William Massey and retired in 1928.

New Zealand Parliament
Preceded by William Massey	Member of Parliament for Franklin; 1925–1928	Succeeded by Jack Massey
