= Rangiriri (electorate) =

Rangiriri was a rural New Zealand parliamentary electorate in the Waikato Region from 1978 to 1984.

== Population centres ==
The 1977 electoral redistribution was the most overtly political since the Representation Commission had been established through an amendment to the Representation Act in 1886, initiated by Muldoon's National Government. As part of the 1976 census, a large number of people failed to fill out an electoral re-registration card, and census staff had not been given the authority to insist on the card being completed. This had little practical effect for people on the general roll, but it transferred Māori to the general roll if the card was not handed in. Together with a northward shift of New Zealand's population, this resulted in five new electorates having to be created in the upper part of the North Island. The electoral redistribution was very disruptive, and 22 electorates were abolished, while 27 electorates were newly created (including Rangiriri) or re-established. These changes came into effect for the 1978 election. The electorate existed from 1978 to 1984: it replaced parts of Franklin and Raglan in 1978, and was replaced mostly by a recreated Raglan electorate, with the balance going to a recreated Franklin in the 1983 electoral redistribution.

Population centres for those six years included Pukekohe, Meremere, Huntly, and Ngāruawāhia.

== History ==
In the 1978 election, the Rangiriri electorate was won by future National minister Bill Birch, who had been MP for the Franklin electorate since the 1972 election. When Rangiriri was abolished for the 1984 election, Birch transferred back to the Franklin electorate.

=== Member of Parliament ===
Key

National

Election	Winner
1978 election	Bill Birch
1981 election	Bill Birch
Electorate abolished 1984; see Raglan and Franklin

== Election results ==
=== 1981 election ===
1981 general election: Rangiriri
Party	Candidate	Votes	%	±%
National	Bill Birch	8,148	46.83	−0.81
Labour	Roy Haywood	5,144	29.56	
Social Credit	Ron Gilberd	4,105	23.59	+6.64
Majority		3,004	17.26	+3.60
Turnout		17,397	87.33	+19.16
Registered electors		19,919		

=== 1978 election ===
1978 general election: Rangiriri
Party	Candidate	Votes	%	±%
National	Bill Birch	7,934	47.64	
Labour	Robert Frederick McKee	5,658	33.97	
Social Credit	Ron Gilberd	2,824	16.95	
Values	John Cameron	238	1.42	
Majority		2,276	13.66	
Turnout		16,654	68.17	
Registered electors		24,428		
