= William Turnbull Swan =

New Zealand Parliament
Years	Term	Electorate	Party
1868–1870	4th	Franklin	Independent

William Turnbull Swan (27 August 1827 – 15 March 1875) was a 19th-century politician in Auckland, New Zealand.

== Life ==
Swan was born in Serampore, West Bengal, India in 1827. At the time, the area was part of Danish India. His elder brother Thomas was also born in Serampore but all younger siblings were born in Birmingham, England. His father, Rev. Thomas Swan, was a leading abolitionist minister for a dissenting congregation in Birmingham. His mother was Elizabeth Swan (née Mcfarlane). In England, Swan had produced a popular book used in National schools. In about 1862, he moved from Birmingham to New Zealand after his publisher had gone bankrupt. In Auckland, he was a clerk at W. J. Young & Co in Queen Street. When the gold rush on Coromandel Peninsula started in 1867, he relocated to what became Thames and was one of the leading citizens who took control of the development of the town.

Swan represented the Franklin electorate in the House of Representatives from 1868 to 1870, when he was defeated standing for the newly formed Thames electorate.

Swan then represented the Thames electorate in the Auckland Provincial Council from 17 October 1872 until his death. He died in his lodgings at Symonds Street, Auckland on 15 March 1875 aged 47 years. He held strong political views that were often unpopular. As a consequence, none of the fellow provincial councillors attended his funeral at Symonds Street Cemetery.

Swan was succeeded on the Provincial Council by William Davies, the mayor of Thames, who beat former Newton councillor William Rowe in a by-election on 5 April 1875.

New Zealand Parliament
Preceded by Robert Graham	Member of Parliament for Franklin; 1868–1871; Served alongside: Theodore Haultain	Succeeded by William Buckland, Archibald Clark
