= Thomas Swan (abolitionist) =

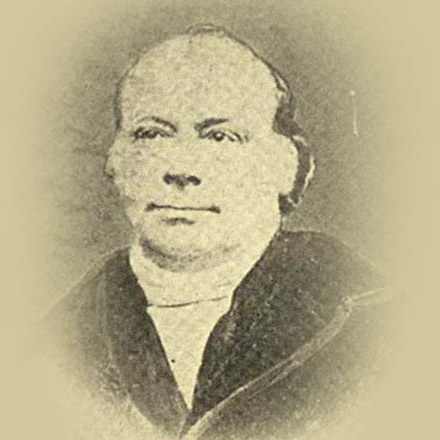
- Born: 1795
- Died: 9 March 1857 (aged 61–62); Glasgow
- Occupations: Professor and Baptist minister
- Employer: Baptist Missionary Society
- Known for: abolitionist

Thomas Swan (1795 – 1857) was a British abolitionist Baptist minister. He worked in India before leading the Cannon Street Baptist Church in Birmingham.

== Life ==
Swan was born in 1795. He was employed by the Baptist Missionary Society and he taught theology in Serampore College in India where his and his wife Elizabeth's first child was born.

He returned to Britain in 1828 to lead the large Cannon Street Baptist Church in Birmingham.

In 1837 his grateful congregation awarded him a silver medal in celebration of the chapel's centenary.

Swan and Knibb are to the right of Sturge who is one of the larger figures in this painting which is of the 1840 World Anti-Slavery Convention.

In 1839 Swan became the President of the Baptist Union. and the Birmingham Anti-Slavery Society became the Birmingham Branch of the British and Foreign Anti-Slavery Society. This society was planning a major convention in 1840 with Bitmingham Quaker Joseph Sturge taking the lead. Swan was able to meet the Jamaican missionary William Knibb who Swan and Joseph Sturge had worked hard to support. They were both based in Birmingham and the frequent letters between them and Knibb illustrate their joint aim of the abolition of slavery. Swan was one of nearly 500 delegates to the World Anti-Slavery Convention. The more notable delegates were included in a commemorative painting and Swan, Sturge and William Knibb all appear in the painting. In 1842 the British and Foreign Anti-Slavery Society met at Swan's church.

== Death and legacy ==
Swan was still the minister in Cannon Street when he died in 1857. His portrait is in the National Gallery as part of Benjamin Robert Haydon's 1941 painting of the 1840 Anti-Slavery Convention and the Smithsonian has a portrait of him by Janet Russel Swan. His church in Birmingham was demolished as part of refurbishment in the 19th century, but the Cannon Street Memorial Baptist Church was created in Handsworth. His son William Turnbull Swan served in New Zealand's parliament.

A blue plaque was created for him by the Birmingham Civic Society. It was unveiled in 2019 and it was later installed on his home in Yew Tree Road.
