= Jack Massey (politician) =

New Zealand politician (1885–1964)

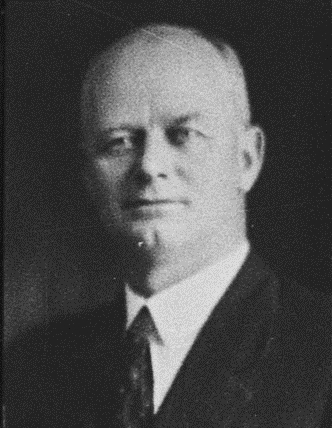
- Jack Massey c. 1928

Member of the New Zealand Parliament for Franklin
- In office 15 October 1938 – 30 November 1957
- Preceded by: Arthur Sexton
- Succeeded by: Alf Allen
- In office 14 November 1928 – 27 November 1935
- Preceded by: Ewen McLennan
- Succeeded by: Arthur Sexton

Personal details
- Born: John Norman Massey; 17 November 1885 Māngere, New Zealand
- Died: 12 December 1964 (aged 79) Papakura, Auckland, New Zealand
- Resting place: Cremated, ashes scattered
- Party: Reform (1931–36); National (1936–57)
- Spouse: Ruby Phyllis Scheauch
- Parent(s): William Massey; Christina Paul
- Relatives: Walter Massey (brother)

John Norman Massey (17 November 1885 – 12 December 1964) was a New Zealand politician of the Reform Party and then the National Party.

== Biography ==
=== Early life and career ===
Massey was born in Māngere in 1885. He attended Mangere Central School before taking up work on his family farm. In 1907 purchased a farm of his own at Puni, near Pukekohe, where he drained swamp country.

=== Political career ===
New Zealand Parliament
Years	Term	Electorate	Party
1928–1931	23rd	Franklin	Reform
1931–1935	24th	Franklin	Reform
1938–1943	26th	Franklin	National
1943–1946	27th	Franklin	National
1946–1949	28th	Franklin	National
1949–1951	29th	Franklin	National
1951–1954	30th	Franklin	National
1954–1957	31st	Franklin	National

He became a member, and later chairman, of the Franklin County Council for eighteen years, and Chairman of the Aka Aka Drainage Board for fourteen years. He was a son of Prime Minister William Massey, who held Franklin from 1896 until his death in 1925. He was the brother of Walter William Massey who represented the Hauraki electorate from 1931 to 1935.

He represented the Franklin electorate from 1928 to 1935, when he was defeated by Arthur Sexton of the Country Party. Labour did not run a candidate against him in 1935.

In 1935, he was awarded the King George V Silver Jubilee Medal. After his defeat he was a leading figure in establishing the new National Party and was prominent at the inaugural party conference that established the party structure and rules.

He was re-elected in 1938, as Labour stood a candidate, and the anti-government vote was split between Labour and the Country Party. In 1942 he was one of four National MPs who crossed the floor and voted with the Labour government in a no confidence vote over government handling of a coal miners strike. He was temporarily expelled from the National caucus, but later readmitted. He held the seat for National until he was deselected as the National candidate in 1957. Massey had indicated in both 1951 and 1954 that he would retire at the end of the term only to recant. By 1957, the 72-year old Massey was dumped by the local members in favour of Alf Allen, also a farmer.

In 1953, Massey was awarded the Queen Elizabeth II Coronation Medal.

=== Death ===
He died in 1964.

== Notes ==
New Zealand Parliament
Preceded by Arthur Sexton	Member of Parliament for Franklin; 1938–1957 1928–1935	Succeeded by Alf Allen
Preceded by Ewen McLennan	Member of Parliament for Franklin; 1938–1957 1928–1935	Succeeded by Arthur Sexton
