= Arthur Sexton =

New Zealand politician

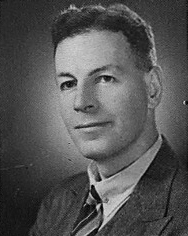
- Sexton in 1935

Member of the New Zealand Parliament for Franklin
- In office 1935–1938
- Preceded by: Jack Massey
- Succeeded by: Jack Massey

Personal details
- Born: 1892 Auckland, New Zealand
- Died: 30 June 1970 (aged 77–78) Auckland, New Zealand
- Resting place: Waikumete Cemetery, Auckland, New Zealand
- Party: Country Party
- Spouse: Gladys Cecily Ann Astley

Arthur Clifton Axford Sexton (1892 – 30 June 1970) was a New Zealand politician of the Country Party.

== Early life and career ==
Sexton was born in Auckland in 1892. He was educated at Auckland Grammar School and later was admitted to Auckland University where he graduated with a Bachelor of Law in 1914. He then served in the army during World War I where he was twice wounded (eventually losing a leg) and rose from the rank of private to that of captain.

After the war, he attended law lectures in London and following being discharged from military service in 1918, he married Gladys Cicely Annie Astley (1891–1962), the granddaughter of suffragist Annie Jane Schnackenberg. He passed his master's degree in laws with honours and also won the senior university scholarship in law for New Zealand in 1919. He then moved to Manurewa and began practising law in Auckland. For a total of 14 years he served as president, vice-president and executive member of the Auckland Returned Services Association.

== Political career ==
New Zealand Parliament
Years	Term	Electorate	Party
1935–38	25th	Franklin	Country Party

Sexton unsuccessfully stood for the Auckland City Council as an independent candidate in the 1921 local elections. He was then elected a member of the Manurewa Town Board and for six years was chairman.

He was the Member of Parliament for Franklin from 1935 to 1938, when he was defeated by Jack Massey of the National Party.

Harold Rushworth, the other member of parliament for the Country Party, retired in 1938. The Country Party disappeared soon after the 1938 election.

New Zealand Parliament
Preceded by Jack Massey	Member of Parliament for Franklin; 1935–1938	Succeeded by Jack Massey
