= Maramarua (electorate) =

Maramarua is a former New Zealand parliamentary electorate to the south of the Auckland area from 1987 to 1993. During those two parliamentary terms, Maramarua was represented by Bill Birch of the National Party.

== Population centres ==
The 1987 electoral redistribution took the continued population growth in the North Island into account, and two additional general electorates were created, bringing the total number of electorates to 97. In the South Island, the shift of population to Christchurch had continued. Overall, three electorates were newly created (including Maramarua), three electorates were recreated, and four electorates were abolished. All of those electorates were in the North Island. Changes in the South Island were restricted to boundary changes. These changes came into effect with the 1987 election. The area covered by the Maramarua electorate had previously belonged to the Franklin, Waikato, and Hauraki electorates.

Population centres included Pukekohe in the north-west, Pōkeno, Meremere in the south-west, Mangatarata and Ngatea in the south, and Thames in the north-east.

== History ==
Bill Birch of the National Party was the elected representative of the Maramarua electorate during its two parliamentary terms of existence from 1987 to 1993. Birch had first entered parliament through the 1972 election for the Franklin electorate. Birch was based in Pukekohe and during his 27 years in parliament, he always contested the electorate into which that town fell. When the Maramarua electorate was abolished for the 1993 election, Birch moved to the reconstituted Franklin electorate.

=== Member of Parliament ===
Key

National

Election	Winner
1987 election	Bill Birch
1990 election	Bill Birch
