= Franklin North =

Franklin North was a parliamentary electorate in the North Island of New Zealand from 1881 to 1890.

== Population centres ==
The previous electoral redistribution was undertaken in 1875 for the 1875–1876 election. In the six years since, New Zealand's European population had increased by 65%. In the 1881 electoral redistribution, the House of Representatives increased the number of European representatives to 91 (up from 84 since the 1875–76 election). The number of Māori electorates was held at four. The House further decided that electorates should not have more than one representative, which led to 35 new electorates being formed, including Franklin North, and two electorates that had previously been abolished to be recreated. This necessitated a major disruption to existing boundaries.

Franklin North included the towns of Papatoetoe, and Papakura from 1881 to 1887. In 1887 with the growth of Auckland Franklin North contracted in area, and Papakura was transferred to Franklin South.

== History ==
The electorates of Franklin North and Franklin South were created from the former Franklin electorate in 1881, and were absorbed back into the reconstituted Franklin electorate in 1890.

The first representative was Benjamin Harris, who had since the 1879 election represented the Franklin electorate.

Four candidates contested the Franklin North electorate in the 1881 election. Captain Harris beat Frank Buckland by just two votes. Early in 1882, Buckland petitioned to the courts against the election on various grounds. The case was heard by the Chief Justice, James Prendergast, and Justice Gillies, who declared the election void. Harris won the subsequent 1882 by-election.

In the 1884 election, Harris was defeated by Buckland. Buckland in turn was defeated in the 1887 election by Frank Lawry. At the end of the term, the electorate was abolished and Lawry successfully contested the Parnell electorate in the 1890 election.

=== Members of Parliament ===
The electorate was represented by three Members of Parliament:

Key

Independent

Election	Winner
1881 election	Benjamin Harris
1882 by-election	Benjamin Harris
1884 election	Frank Buckland
1887 election	Frank Lawry

== Election results ==
=== 1882 by-election ===
1882 Franklin North by-election
Party	Candidate	Votes	%	±%
Independent	Benjamin Harris	529	51.46	
Independent	Frank Buckland	499	48.54	
Majority		30	2.92	
Turnout		1,028	71.69	
Registered electors		1,434		

=== 1881 election ===
1881 general election: Franklin North
Party	Candidate	Votes	%	±%
Independent	Benjamin Harris	323	40.07	
Independent	Frank Buckland	321	39.83	
Independent	Samuel Luke	154	19.11	
Independent	John Gordon	8	0.99	
Majority		2	0.25	
Informal votes		7	0.86	
Turnout		813	56.69	
Registered electors		1,434		
