= 1874 Franklin by-election =

New Zealand by-election

The 1874 Franklin by-election was a by-election held on 9 April 1874 in the Franklin electorate during the 5th New Zealand Parliament.

The by-election was caused by the resignation of the incumbent MP Archibald Clark on 2 February 1874.

At the nomination meeting, five candidates were nominated, four of whom were present and addressed the electors. The four were William Woodward, William Goodfellow, Joseph May, and Frank Henry Troupe. Joseph Dargaville was the candidate who was absent. Subsequent to the nomination meeting, Woodward sent a telegram of withdrawal and Dargaville also "retired", but both were included in the official results. The by-election was won by May.

== Results ==
1874 Franklin by-election
Party	Candidate	Votes	%	±%
Independent	Joseph May	180	38.14	
Independent	William Goodfellow	156	33.05	
Independent	Frank Henry Troup	121	25.64	
Independent	William Woodward	9	1.91	
Independent	Joseph Dargaville	6	1.27	
Turnout		472		
Majority		24	5.08	
