= 1882 Franklin North by-election =

New Zealand by-election

The 1882 Franklin North by-election was a by-election held on 9 June 1882 during the 8th New Zealand Parliament in the rural South Auckland electorate of Franklin North.

The by-election was caused by the election of Benjamin Harris in the 1881 election being declared void on a petition of the losing candidate Frank Buckland. Chief Justice James Prendergast, and Justice Gillies declared the election void. Allegations were made of "intimidation".

However Benjamin Harris won the subsequent by-election.

== Results ==
The following table gives the election result:

1882 Franklin North by-election
Party	Candidate	Votes	%	±%
Independent	Benjamin Harris	529	51.46	
Independent	Frank Buckland	499	48.54	
Majority		30	2.92	
Turnout		1,028	71.69	
Registered electors		1,434		
