= Franklin (New Zealand electorate) =

Franklin was a rural New Zealand parliamentary electorate. It existed from 1861 to 1996 during four periods.

== Population centres ==
The original electorate from 1861 to 1881 included the South Auckland towns of Papatoetoe, Papakura, Pukekohe and Waiuku, and west of Waiuku to the West Coast. When reconstituted in 1890 the northern boundary was north of Papakura, and (with the growth of Auckland) now excluded Papatoetoe.

In December 1887, the House of Representatives voted to reduce its membership from general electorates from 91 to 70. The 1890 electoral redistribution used the same 1886 census data used for the 1887 electoral redistribution. In addition, three-member electorates were introduced in the four main centres. This resulted in a major restructuring of electorates, and Franklin was one of eight electorates to be re-created for the 1890 election.

The 1981 census had shown that the North Island had experienced further population growth, and three additional general seats were created through the 1983 electoral redistribution, bringing the total number of electorates to 95. The South Island had, for the first time, experienced a population loss, but its number of general electorates was fixed at 25 since the 1967 electoral redistribution. More of the South Island population was moving to Christchurch, and two electorates were abolished, while two electorates were recreated. In the North Island, six electorates were newly created, three electorates were recreated (including Franklin), and six electorates were abolished.

The 1987 electoral redistribution took the continued population growth in the North Island into account, and two additional general electorates were created, bringing the total number of electorates to 97. In the South Island, the shift of population to Christchurch had continued. Overall, three electorates were newly created, three electorates were recreated, and four electorates were abolished (including Franklin). All of those electorates were in the North Island. Changes in the South Island were restricted to boundary changes. These changes came into effect with the 1987 election.

== History ==
The electorate existed from 1861 to 1881 as a two-member electorate, when it was split into the Franklin North and Franklin South electorates. One of the first MPs, Marmaduke Nixon was killed in action in 1864 whilst leading an assault on a Māori village during the Invasion of the Waikato, forcing the 1864 by-election. In 1890 it was reconstituted, to 1978 and then from 1984 to 1987, and 1993–96. From 1978 to 1984 it was renamed the Rangiriri electorate, and from 1987 to 1993 it was renamed the Maramarua electorate but in 1993 it reverted to "Franklin". In 1996 with MMP, the area became part of the Port Waikato electorate.

The single-member electorate was first represented by Ebenezer Hamlin from 1890 to 1893 when he retired. Benjamin Harris defeated the future Prime Minister William Massey in 1893, but the 1896 contest had the opposite outcome. From 1896 to 1925 Franklin was represented by the Reform Party's Massey, known as Farmer Bill, the Prime Minister from 1912 to 1925. Ewen McLennan then held the electorate for one term before he retired, and was replaced by Massey's son Jack Massey.

In 1935 Franklin was won by Arthur Sexton of the Country Party, largely due to growing discontent amongst rural voters that the Reform Party was valuing city businessmen over rural farmers. The party's support of monetary reform also resonated with rural farmers who had been seeing low prices for produce during the Great Depression. The seat in 1938 to Jack Massey, now standing for the National Party. He held the seat until 1957, when he was deselected by the National Party in favour of Alfred E. Allen. Alf Allen held the seat until 1972, when he retired and was replaced by future National minister Bill Birch, who held the seat over the remaining three periods that the seat existed.

=== Members of Parliament ===
==== Multi-member electorate ====
Key

Independent Conservative Liberal Reform Country Party National

Election	Winners	
1861 election	Robert Graham	Marmaduke Nixon
1864 by-election	Robert Graham	Theodore Haultain
1866 election	Robert Graham	Theodore Haultain
1868 by-election	William Turnbull Swan	Theodore Haultain
1871 election	William Buckland	Archibald Clark
1874 by-election	William Buckland	Joseph May
1876 election	Hugh Lusk	Ebenezer Hamlin
1878 by-election	Richard Hobbs	Ebenezer Hamlin
1879 election	Benjamin Harris	Ebenezer Hamlin
(Electorate abolished 1881–1890, see Franklin North and Franklin South)

==== Single-member electorate ====
Election	Winner
1890 election	Ebenezer Hamlin
1893 election	Benjamin Harris
1896 election	William Massey
1899 election	William Massey
1902 election	William Massey
1905 election	William Massey
1908 election	William Massey
1911 election	William Massey
1914 election	William Massey
1919 election	William Massey
1922 election	William Massey
1925 by-election	Ewen McLennan
1925 election	Ewen McLennan
1928 election	Jack Massey
1931 election	Jack Massey
1935 election	Arthur Sexton
1938 election	Jack Massey
1943 election	Jack Massey
1946 election	Jack Massey
1949 election	Jack Massey
1951 election	Jack Massey
1954 election	Jack Massey
1957 election	Alfred E. Allen
1960 election	Alfred E. Allen
1963 election	Alfred E. Allen
1966 election	Alfred E. Allen
1969 election	Alfred E. Allen
1972 election	Bill Birch
1975 election	Bill Birch
(Electorate abolished 1978–1984, see Rangiriri)
1984 election	Bill Birch
(Electorate abolished 1987–1993, see Maramarua)
1993 election	Bill Birch
(Electorate abolished in 1996; see Port Waikato)

== Election results ==
=== 1993 election ===
1993 general election: Franklin
Party	Candidate	Votes	%	±%
National	Bill Birch	7,723	43.01	
Alliance	Judy Bischoff	4,180	23.28	
Labour	Shane Te Pou	2,776	15.46	
NZ First	Patra de Coudray	2,567	14.29	
Christian Heritage	Roelof Voschezang	321	1.78	
McGillicuddy Serious	Dominic Charles Worthington	192	1.06	
Independent	Ian Wilson	132	0.73	
Natural Law	Jan Flynn	62	0.34	
Majority		3,543	19.73	
Turnout		17,953	80.17	
Registered electors		22,392		

=== 1984 election ===
1984 general election: Franklin
Party	Candidate	Votes	%	±%
National	Bill Birch	10,501	51.46	
Labour	Roy Haywood	5,291	25.93	
NZ Party	Noel McGuire	2,880	14.11	
Social Credit	Alan Scott	1,600	7.84	
Values	M Haines	131	0.64	
Majority		5,210	25.53	
Turnout		20,403	89.87	
Registered electors		22,701		

=== 1975 election ===
1975 general election: Franklin
Party	Candidate	Votes	%	±%
National	Bill Birch	10,844	64.89	+6.97
Labour	Ron Ng-Waishing	3,239	19.38	
Social Credit	Geoff Morell	1,657	9.91	−0.36
Values	Jock Hutton	950	5.68	
Socialist Unity	Grahame Roberts	21	0.12	
Majority		7,605	45.50	+16.28
Turnout		16,711	81.13	−6.60
Registered electors		20,597		

=== 1972 election ===
1972 general election: Franklin
Party	Candidate	Votes	%	±%
National	Bill Birch	8,300	57.92	
Labour	Geoff Braybrooke	4,112	28.69	
Social Credit	Geoff Morell	1,472	10.27	
Liberal Reform	Thomas Edward Keven	361	2.51	
New Democratic	M H Lawson	84	0.58	
Majority		4,188	29.22	
Turnout		14,329	87.73	+1.88
Registered electors		16,333		

=== 1969 election ===
1969 general election: Franklin
Party	Candidate	Votes	%	±%
National	Alfred E. Allen	8,900	62.76	+5.97
Labour	Tai Tuhimata	3,405	24.01	
Social Credit	Thomas Allan Wheeler	1,875	13.22	−1.52
Majority		5,495	38.75	−0.56
Turnout		14,180	85.85	−0.70
Registered electors		16,516		

=== 1966 election ===
1966 general election: Franklin
Party	Candidate	Votes	%	±%
National	Alfred E. Allen	7,343	56.79	−9.15
Labour	Ron Ng-Waishing	2,260	17.48	−4.08
Social Credit	Thomas Allan Wheeler	1,907	14.74	+2.25
Democratic	Malcolm John Muir	1,419	10.97	
Majority		5,083	39.31	−5.07
Turnout		12,929	86.55	−0.75
Registered electors		14,938		

=== 1963 election ===
1963 general election: Franklin
Party	Candidate	Votes	%	±%
National	Alfred E. Allen	8,690	65.94	+2.60
Labour	Ron Ng-Waishing	2,841	21.56	
Social Credit	Thomas Allan Wheeler	1,646	12.49	+4.32
Majority		5,849	44.38	+9.52
Turnout		13,177	87.30	−1.90
Registered electors		15,093		

=== 1960 election ===
1960 general election: Franklin
Party	Candidate	Votes	%	±%
National	Alfred E. Allen	9,442	63.34	+3.28
Labour	Howard Preston	4,245	28.47	
Social Credit	Thomas Allan Wheeler	1,219	8.17	−1.59
Majority		5,197	34.86	+4.98
Turnout		14,906	89.20	−1.86
Registered electors		16,710		

=== 1957 election ===
1957 general election: Franklin
Party	Candidate	Votes	%	±%
National	Alfred E. Allen	8,522	60.06	
Labour	Christopher Mountford	4,281	30.17	
Social Credit	Thomas Allan Wheeler	1,386	9.76	−2.49
Majority		4,241	29.88	
Turnout		14,189	91.06	+3.49
Registered electors		15,581		

=== 1954 election ===
1954 general election: Franklin
Party	Candidate	Votes	%	±%
National	Jack Massey	7,299	63.97	−5.13
Labour	Percival Peacock	2,712	23.77	
Social Credit	Thomas Allan Wheeler	1,398	12.25	
Majority		4,587	40.20	+2.00
Turnout		11,409	87.57	−0.55
Registered electors		13,027		

=== 1951 election ===
1951 general election: Franklin
Party	Candidate	Votes	%	±%
National	Jack Massey	9,691	69.10	−0.77
Labour	Arthur Faulkner	4,333	30.89	
Majority		5,358	38.20	−1.54
Turnout		14,024	88.12	−4.33
Registered electors		15,914		

=== 1949 election ===
1949 general election: Franklin
Party	Candidate	Votes	%	±%
National	Jack Massey	9,635	69.87	+4.48
Labour	John Parsons	4,154	30.12	
Majority		5,481	39.74	+8.96
Turnout		13,789	92.45	−1.57
Registered electors		14,915		

=== 1946 election ===
1946 general election: Franklin
Party	Candidate	Votes	%	±%
National	Jack Massey	8,545	65.39	+4.42
Labour	Alex Gunn	4,522	34.60	
Majority		4,023	30.78	+0.31
Turnout		13,067	94.02	+3.51
Registered electors		13,898		

=== 1943 election ===
1943 general election: Franklin
Party	Candidate	Votes	%	±%
National	Jack Massey	6,572	60.97	+8.64
Labour	Aaron Best	3,287	30.49	
Democratic Labour	Daniel Patrick Lloyd	598	5.54	
Real Democracy	Ernest Moss	235	2.18	
Informal votes		86	0.79	−0.44
Majority		3,285	30.47	+11.05
Turnout		10,778	90.51	−4.19
Registered electors		11,907		

=== 1938 election ===
1938 general election: Franklin
Party	Candidate	Votes	%	±%
National	Jack Massey	5,542	52.33	+8.27
Labour	Ernest Piggott	3,485	32.91	
Country Party	Arthur Sexton	1,564	14.77	−36.62
Majority		2,057	19.42	
Informal votes		37	0.35	
Turnout		10,628	94.70	
Registered electors		11,223		

=== 1935 election ===
1935 general election: Franklin
Party	Candidate	Votes	%	±%
Country Party	Arthur Sexton	4,803	51.39	
Reform	Jack Massey	4,118	44.06	−12.77
Democrat	B C Fyers	368	3.93	
Majority		685	7.32	
Informal votes		57	0.60	
Turnout		9,346		+13.49

=== 1931 election ===
1931 general election: Franklin
Party	Candidate	Votes	%	±%
Reform	Jack Massey	4,968	64.16	
Country Party	Harry Mellsop	2,511	32.43	
Independent	John Humphries Edwards (Note: Edwards was chosen by the local committee of the Labour Party, but was not endorsed by the national executive)	264	3.41	
Majority		2,457	31.73	
Informal votes		55	0.71	
Turnout		7,798	82.56	
Registered electors		9,445		

Table footnotes:

=== 1928 election ===
1928 general election: Franklin
Party	Candidate	Votes	%	±%
Reform	Jack Massey	4,025	50.85	
Country Party	Harry Mellsop	3,891	49.15	
Majority		134	1.69	
Informal votes		51	0.64	
Turnout		7,967	86.86	
Registered electors		9,172		

=== 1925 by-election ===
1925 Franklin by-election
Party	Candidate	Votes	%	±%
Reform	Ewen McLennan	6,056	72.96	
Labour	John Sommerville Montgomerie	2,245	27.04	
Informal votes		43	0.5	
Majority		3,811	45.91	
Turnout		8,344		
Reform hold		Swing		

=== 1922 election ===
1922 general election: Franklin
Party	Candidate	Votes	%	±%
Reform	William Massey	5,276	66.70	−1.72
Liberal	Joseph Rea	2,526	31.94	+12.92
Informal votes		108	1.36	+0.82
Majority		2,750	34.76	−14.66
Turnout		7,910	88.73	−3.40
Registered electors		8,914		

=== 1919 election ===
1919 general election: Franklin
Party	Candidate	Votes	%	±%
Reform	William Massey	4,195	68.42	−3.40
Liberal	Joseph Rea	1,165	19.02	
Labour	Ernest Piggott	637	10.38	
Informal votes		134	2.18	+1.17
Majority		3,030	49.42	+5.78
Turnout		6,131	85.33	+0.99
Registered electors		7,185		

=== 1914 election ===
1914 general election: Franklin
Party	Candidate	Votes	%	±%
Reform	William Massey	4,818	71.82	+4.83
Liberal	Arthur Glass	1,890	28.17	
Informal votes		68	1.01	+0.30
Majority		2,928	43.64	−8.85
Turnout		6,708	84.34	+3.87
Registered electors		7,953		

=== 1911 election ===
1911 general election: Franklin
Party	Candidate	Votes	%	±%
Reform	William Massey	3,779	66.99	−4.37
Liberal	John McLarin	1,816	32.20	−3.69
Informal votes		46	0.81	−0.67
Majority		1,963	34.79	+8.07
Turnout		5,641	80.47	+2.04
Registered electors		7,010		

=== 1908 election ===
1908 general election: Franklin
Party	Candidate	Votes	%	±%
Conservative	William Massey	2,781	62.62	+5.04
Liberal	John McLarin	1,594	35.89	
Informal votes		66	1.48	−0.97
Majority		1,187	26.72	−9.10
Turnout		4,441	78.43	−7.48
Registered electors		5,662		

=== 1905 election ===
1905 general election: Franklin
Party	Candidate	Votes	%	±%
Conservative	William Massey	3,120	57.58	−9.29
Liberal	William Wilson McCardle	2,165	39.95	
Informal votes		133	2.45	+1.96
Majority		955	17.62	−16.61
Turnout		5,418	85.91	+15.10
Registered electors		6,306		

=== 1902 election ===
1902 general election: Franklin
Party	Candidate	Votes	%	±%
Conservative	William Massey	2,297	66.87	+1.08
Liberal	Alfred Richard Harris	1,121	32.63	
Informal votes		17	0.49	
Majority		1,176	34.23	+2.65
Turnout		3,435	70.81	−7.09
Registered electors		4,851		

=== 1899 election ===
1899 general election: Franklin
Party	Candidate	Votes	%	±%
Conservative	William Massey	2,458	65.79	−10.03
Liberal	W Findlay Wilson	1,278	34.21	
Majority		1,180	31.58	−19.48
Turnout		3,736	77.90	
Registered electors		4,796		

=== 1896 election ===
1896 general election: Franklin
Party	Candidate	Votes	%	±%
Conservative	William Massey	2,184	55.76	+7.12
Liberal	Benjamin Harris	1,710	43.66	−7.70
Informal votes		23	0.58	
Majority		474	12.10	
Turnout		3,917		

=== 1893 election ===
1893 general election: Franklin
Party	Candidate	Votes	%	±%
Liberal	Benjamin Harris	1,684	51.36	+3.21
Conservative	William Massey	1,595	48.64	
Majority		89	2.71	
Turnout		3,279	79.55	+18.16
Registered electors		4,122		

=== 1890 election ===
1890 general election: Franklin
Party	Candidate	Votes	%	±%
Conservative	Ebenezer Hamlin	732	51.84	
Independent Liberal	Benjamin Harris	680	48.15	
Majority		52	3.68	
Turnout		1,412	61.39	
Registered electors		2,300		

=== 1874 by-election ===
1874 Franklin by-election
Party	Candidate	Votes	%	±%
Independent	Joseph May	180	38.14	
Independent	William Goodfellow	156	33.05	
Independent	Frank Henry Troup	121	25.64	
Independent	William Woodward	9	1.91	
Independent	Joseph Dargaville	6	1.27	
Turnout		472		
Majority		24	5.08	

=== 1868 by-election ===
1868 Franklin by-election
Party	Candidate	Votes	%	±%
Independent	William Turnbull Swan	619	53.04	
Independent	William Buckland	548	46.96	
Turnout		1167		
Majority		71	6.08	
