= Hugh Lusk =

New Zealand politician (1837–1926)

Hugh Hart Lusk
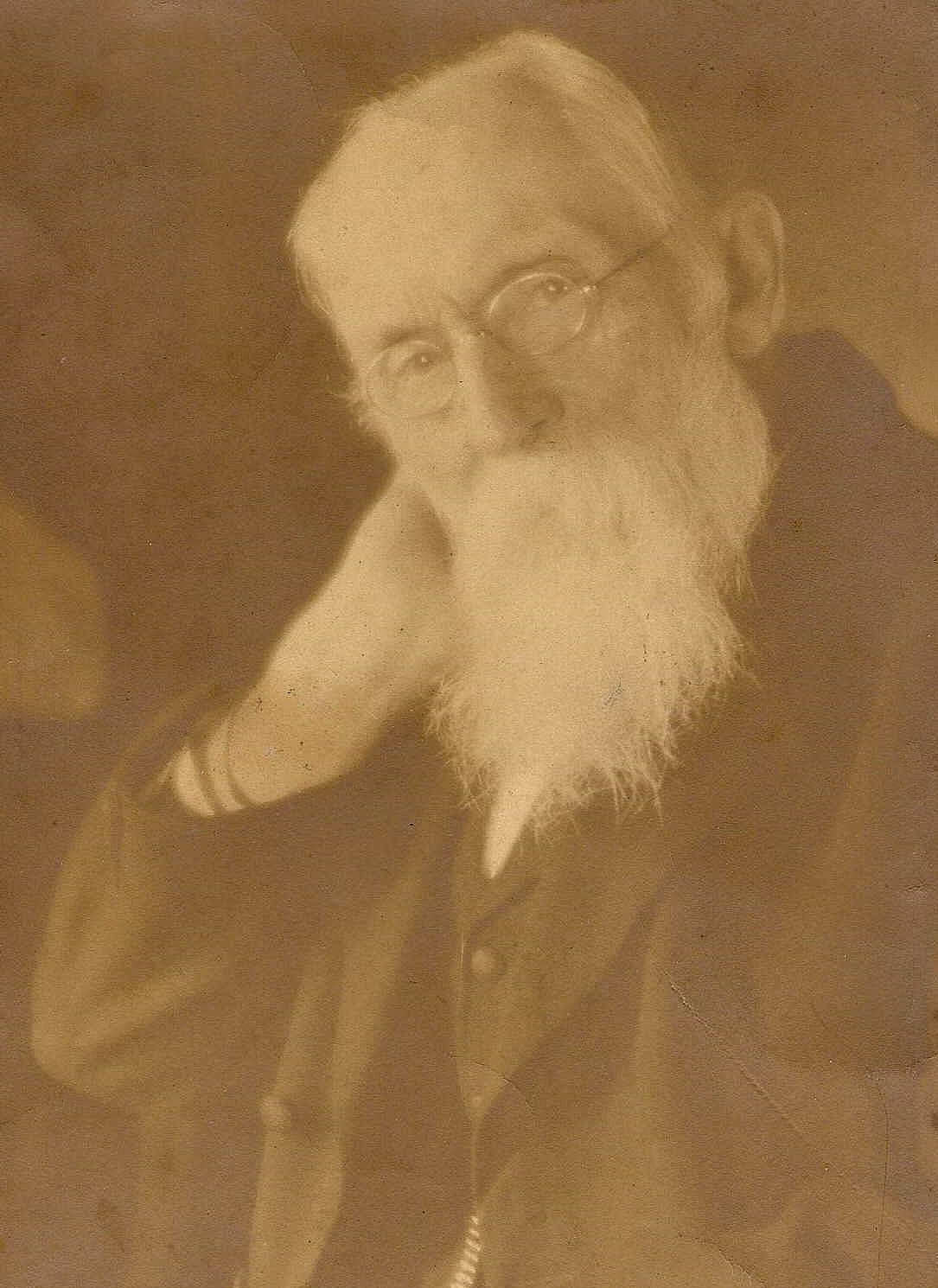
- Hugh Lusk, photographed in about the 1920s.
- Born: Hugh Hart Lusk; 28 August 1838; Carron Grove (near Falkirk), Stirlingshire, Scotland
- Died: 8 September 1926; Auckland, New Zealand
- Occupations: Politician, writer
- Years active: 1865 – 1913
- Spouse: Mary Anne Butler (m. 1864)
- Parents: Robert Baillie Lusk; Jessie Hart

Hugh Hart Lusk (28 August 1838 – 8 September 1926) was a New Zealand writer active in his home country, as well as Australia and America, during the late 19th century and early 20th century. He wrote books and articles on progressive social and political issues, in addition to works of fiction. In the mid-1870s he was briefly a member of parliament for an electorate in the Auckland Region of New Zealand. Lusk also worked as a solicitor and barrister, but in 1894 he was struck off the New South Wales roll of barristers for financial misconduct. His 1899 novel, Eureka, is an early example of Australian science-fiction.

== Biography ==
=== Early years ===
Hugh Hart Lusk was born on 28 August 1838 at Carron Grove, near Falkirk in Stirlingshire, Scotland, the youngest son of Robert Baillie Lusk and Jessie (née Hart). His father was a stationer and bookseller. Hugh's mother died in 1841.

In 1849 Hugh, aged 11 years, emigrated to New Zealand in company with his father and four siblings. The family were passengers on the Thames, a barque of 407 tons, which departed from London in July and arrived at Auckland on 26 November 1849. By 1852 the Lusk family was living at Onehunga, a suburb of Auckland.

By 1857 Hugh's father was employed as the Provincial Accountant of the Province of Auckland.

In November 1860, after a competitive examination, Lusk attained an annual scholarship of £55 to attend St. John's College in Auckland.

=== Newspaper and legal work ===
Hugh Lusk and Mary Anne Butler were married on 14 November 1864 at Mangōnui, near the northern tip of New Zealand.^{[A]} The couple had eight children, born between 1866 and 1887.^{[B]} By 1868 the family was living in Auckland.

In 1866 Lusk formed a company called the Auckland Advertiser Printing Company, in an attempt to establish a newspaper. The venture failed from a deficiency of shareholders.

For several months in 1867 Lusk took on the role of editor of the Examiner newspaper, based at Nelson in New Zealand's South Island.

Lusk travelled to Sydney and on 19 June 1867 he was admitted as a barrister to the New South Wales bar. He returned to Auckland in late June 1867 as a passenger on the clipper ship, Alice Cameron. By October 1867 Hugh Lusk was working as a solicitor, with an office in Auckland.

=== Politics ===
Lusk was a founding member of the Auckland Financial Reform League, formed in February 1868. In March 1868 he presented a lecture on 'The Past History and Present Position of Taxation in New Zealand' in the Odd Fellows' Hall in Auckland. Lusk was described as "a polished speaker".

On 5 December 1870 Hugh Lusk was appointed to the roles of Provincial Secretary and Provincial Treasurer in the office of the Superintendent of Auckland Province.

During the 1870s Lusk was considered to be one of New Zealand's leading chess players. In August 1871 he assisted in forming the Auckland Chess Club.

In May 1873 Lusk announced his intention to become a candidate at the forthcoming election for Superintendent of the province of Auckland. Lusk was a strong advocate of free education for children; in his role as Provincial Secretary and member of the Education Board, he was associated with the implementation of an education tax that had been introduced in January 1873. His advocacy of the direct education tax proved to be unpopular and led to disruptions at political meetings in the lead-up to the election. At a meeting in the Auckland Mechanics' Institute in July 1873 in favour of Lusk's candidacy, the crowd was so boisterous and disorderly that an hour elapsed before the Lusk could be heard. When his speech concluded, "a motion was made that Lusk having introduced the Education tax he was not fit to be Superintendent". His supporters countered with an amendment in favour of Lusk, after which the gas-light was extinguished and the chairman and others on the platform were "hustled and bonneted". After the gas was relighted, the motion against Lusk was put and declared carried. The whole affair was described as the "rowdiest meeting ever held in Auckland". One of the most prominent political issues of the mid-1870s was the question of the abolition of the New Zealand provincial governments. In his bid for the superintendency of Auckland Province, Lusk ran on an openly abolitionist platform. His speeches on this subject in Auckland's hinterland tended to be well received, where pro-abolition and anti-Auckland sentiments were strong.

The election for the Superintendent of Auckland Province was held in November 1873 and was won by the veteran politician, John Williamson, with Lusk attracting the least number of votes of three candidates. In a report of the election results it was noted that "Lusk had all the dead weight of the education tax to carry, but may justly pride himself on having secured a large support with very little expenditure, employing hardly any canvassers, and having the confidence of a great proportion of the most respectable electors".

New Zealand Parliament
Years	Term	Electorate	Party
1876–1878	6th	Franklin	Independent

By November 1875 Lusk was being mooted as a candidate for the Franklin electorate, a rural district south of Auckland, at the forthcoming general election. The elections of members of the sixth session of the New Zealand parliament were held in December 1875 and January 1876. On 18 January 1876 Lusk and Ebenezer Hamlin were elected for the electorate of Franklin, which at that time was a two-member electorate. Both Lusk and Hamlin were candidates supporting Sir George Grey's faction.

In 1877 Lusk, the member for Franklin, was found guilty of contempt in the New Zealand House of Representatives after having received a payment from the Auckland City Council for advocating legislative amendments advantageous to the council. The fine of £50 was the maximum allowed under the Standing Orders and was equal to the amount paid to Lusk.

At a public meeting of Franklin electors at Ōtāhuhu on 16 April 1878, Lusk announced his intention to resign from Parliament. His stated reason was monetary considerations, claiming that he "was sacrificing his business to politics, and it was incumbent on him to study his own and his family's personal interests". In an editorial in the Auckland Star, reporting his resignation, it was said of Lusk: "While endowed with considerable intellectual talent and conspicuously industrious, the retiring member lacks that sincerity and depth of conviction, and that enthusiasm which fits a man for great undertakings".

=== Legal work ===
After resigning from parliament in April 1878, Lusk resumed work as a solicitor.

In about December 1885 Lusk travelled to Samoa in an attempt to enforce a legal claim, on behalf of a man named Cornwall, upon parcels of land (totalling ten thousand acres) on the main islands of Upolu and Savai'i, then in possession of McArthur and Co. Lusk, with two others, travelled by boat from Apia to the village of Fale'ula (on Upolu), intending to take formal possession of the land, but were ordered off by a native chief and two others. The party then left by boat and proceeded to Fasito'o Tai village, but the chief and the two others had travelled there by horseback and again ordered them off. Lusk returned to Apia where he commenced proceedings against McArthur and Co. for the recovery of damages amounting to twenty-one thousand pounds. Lusk returned to Auckland in early January 1886.

Lusk returned to Samoa in May 1886 as part of the legal team appearing for "a native woman named Maneama", in a case against McArthur and Co., seeking to recover possession of about 250 thousand acres of land. Manaema had previously received a deed for the land from Cornwall. The case, heard before the Deputy-Commissioner on Samoa, occupied nine days, at the conclusion of which the Court decided in favour of the defendants, "holding that the deed to Manaema did not entitle her to the legal possession of the land".

=== Australia ===
In August 1886 Lusk was a passenger aboard the steam-ship Rotomahana, travelling from Auckland to Sydney. By September 1886 Lusk was living in Sydney.

In early January 1888 Lusk was elected vice-president of the Sydney School of Arts Chess and Draughts Club at their annual meeting.

In January 1888 Lusk chaired a meeting of about 100 New Zealanders at the Sydney Club House in Pitt Street, described as a gathering "partly of a political and partly of a social character". A resolution carried at the meeting called for the Protection Union in Sydney to secure a tariff to protect the industries of New South Wales, and thus retain those "artisans and others" who had "left New Zealand through lack of employment in that colony". The meeting also carried a resolution condemning the New Zealand government "for its action in shelving the tariff question last year".

In August 1888 Lusk was assigned by the Crown to defend Louisa Collins, a woman who had been charged with the murder of her second husband, Michael Collins. After he died in early July, an inquest returned a verdict that Collins had died from "arsenical poisoning, that poison being administered by his wife". The woman's first husband had also died under suspicious circumstances, and a subsequent autopsy and inquest revealed that he too had died of arsenic poisoning. Louisa Collins was tried for the murder of her second husband in the Sydney Central Criminal Court over three successive days, beginning on 6 August 1888. Lusk, as the defence barrister, acknowledged that Michael Collins had died from "arsenical poisoning", but argued that the Crown had failed to show any motive for his wife "to commit the terrible crime" and asked the jurists to consider the possibility that the deceased had committed suicide. After the trial concluded, the jury were unable to agree on a verdict and were discharged.

Louisa Collins underwent three more trials, on each occasion defended by Lusk. In November 1888 she was re-tried for the murder of her second husband and, later that month, tried for the murder of her first husband; both these trials ended with juries unable to reach a verdict. In December 1888 the Crown returned to its original case and prosecuted Louisa Collins for the third time for the wilful murder of her second husband. On this occasion the jury returned a guilty verdict and the judge passed a sentence of death upon the prisoner. The case attracted considerable public attention. Louisa had been unable to pay for legal counsel and Lusk had represented his client pro bono at all four trials. With a prevailing concern that Lusk was under a disadvantage with no funds to support Louisa's defence, the Premier, Henry Parkes, personally questioned the judge in the fourth trial, the Chief Justice of New South Wales, Sir Frederick Darley, "as to whether the prisoner had been ably defended". Darley reassured Parkes that she had been.

In January 1890 Lusk was awarded a £150 prize by the New South Wales Education Department "for the best composition of the first portion of an Australian history for public school use". In January 1891 the Minister for Public Instruction, Joseph Carruthers, handed Lusk's book of Australian history to a teacher named George Metcalfe, requesting that he "read it carefully and mark any errors". This volume was subject to a number of revisions over the following decade and was eventually printed in 1901.^{[C]}

In November 1890 Hugh H. Lusk, barrister-at-law of Walker Street, North Sydney, was declared bankrupt.

In about May 1891 a 45-page publication written by Lusk, entitled The Outlook of Labour: A Pamphlet on the Relations between Labour and Capital, was published. The writer advocated for political solutions and co-operative enterprises, rather than industrial disputes, as the means of attaining reforms for the working classes.

In the New South Wales colonial election for 1891, Lusk was one of three candidates for the seat of West Maitland, standing for the Protectionist Party. In the poll held on June 17, John Gillies of the Free Trade Party was elected, with Lusk running last with just 11 percent of the votes.

A Brisbane-based newspaper affiliated with the working-class labour movement remarked that Lusk "has repeatedly used the workers of Sydney to establish confidence in himself", adding: "He was often to be seen perched on the platform at Labour meetings".

In June 1893 Lusk was appointed to the Board of Control of the labour settlement at Pitt Town, north-west of Sydney. During their first year of operation the Board met on a weekly basis. The Pitt Town Co-operative Labour Settlement was an attempt by the colonial government to establish a village settlement on co-operative principles as a means to provide employment during the depression of the early 1890s.

In March 1894, in a case heard in the Supreme Court of New South Wales before the Chief Justice, Justice Windeyer and Justice Stephen, Lusk's name was struck off the roll of barristers in consequence of an irregularity regarding a payment of a fee for services. The Court had previously received an affidavit from Samuel Hockley, an administrator of an estate and plaintiff in an equity suit for the recovery of a parcel of land, which claimed that Lusk had been paid £200 "on condition that he would take the entire management of the suit and bring it before a judge or a judge and jury for trial, and have it decided". When the case was ready for trial, Lusk wrote to Hockley stating that a solicitor employed by him had refused to proceed with the case unless he was paid a further sum of £20, which Lusk was unable to pay "as he was not possessed of the money". When asked to explain himself, Lusk claimed the £200 had been used in preparing the case for trial, but "he was unable to give an account of the moneys expended". When the case was heard before the Supreme Court, Lusk did not appear. The Chief Justice, in delivering the judgment, said the Court "utterly disbelieved Mr. Lusk when he said he had spent the money in the conduct of the case". Lusk had paid £30 to the solicitor, but no account of the balance of £170 had been given. The decision of the Court was to strike Lusk's name off the roll of barristers "on the grounds of falsehood and dishonesty". It was the first time in New South Wales that a barrister had been disbarred.

In October 1894 Lusk was removed from the Board of Control of the Pitt Town labour settlement, "in consequence of his having left the Colony".

=== America ===
In 1894 Hugh H. Lusk migrated to the United States where he lived for about a decade.

In 1895 a novel entitled The Track of a Storm, written by Lusk under the pseudonym of 'Owen Hall', was published in both England and America. The central character, Charles Fortescue, is wrongly convicted of highway robbery in England and transported as a convict to Australia, where he is assigned to a landholder in the dry interior of the continent. An Australian review of the novel was critical of the author's method of describing events through the viewpoints of several characters, leading to "a good deal of repetition" in the narration. The reviewer unfavourably compared Hall's writing to the literary techniques of Wilkie Collins.

During the 1890s New Zealand developed a reputation "as the social and economic laboratory of the world, a place where solutions to the pressing problems of the age could be tested and perfected for the benefit of people in larger and older countries". New Zealand had begun to adopt progressive legislative reforms such as women's suffrage, the old-age pension, compulsory arbitration for industrial disputes and the encouragement of small-farm holdings. In 1894 the colony of South Australia followed New Zealand's example by giving women the vote. In 1901, with the federation of the Australian colonies, women's suffrage became nation-wide.

In America Lusk represented himself as an authority on Australian and New Zealand political and social issues and became acquainted with Henry Demarest Lloyd, a progressive political activist and journalist. Lusk assisted with the preparations for Lloyd's tour of Australasia in 1899. Articles written by Lusk, many of them on the subjects of political reforms in New Zealand and Australia, were published in magazines such as The North American Review, The Arena, Harper's Weekly and The Forum. He also lectured on those subjects. On one occasion Lusk delivered a lecture at the Cooper Union in New York on the subject of Australian and New Zealand political reform. In his book Our Foes at Home, published in 1899 by Doubleday & McClure of New York, Lusk urged Americans "to adapt antipodean principles to their own needs". In December 1900 Lusk attended a conference in Chicago on labour relations, at which he delivered a speech advocating compulsory arbitration of labour disputes.

In 1899 the novel Eureka, written by Lusk under his 'Owen Hall' pseudonym, was published by the London-based Chatto & Windus. Eureka is an early example of Australian science-fiction, in which an expedition in search of religious manuscripts in the jungles of Ceylon are led to the inland of Australia, where they discover a hidden city inhabited by a "lost race" of descendants of Alexander the Great's army.

In 1901 the New York publishers of Doubleday & Page published H. D. Lloyd's Newest England, about his tour of Australasia and his enthusiasm for political developments in New Zealand and Australia. In a review in the New-York Tribune of Lloyd's book, as well as Lusk's Our Foes at Home, Lusk was described as "a pessimistic observer of American conditions" who "preaches the discouragement by legal enactment of the accumulation of great and preponderating wealth".

=== Return to New Zealand ===
In early 1904 a series of five weekly articles were published in the Auckland Star newspaper detailing Lusk's impressions of arriving back in New Zealand after an absence of about twenty years. The articles were entitled 'After Many Years' and were published from 30 January to 20 February 1904 under his pseudonym, Owen Hall.

Lusk's wife, Mary, died on 4 October 1905 at the Woodside Private Hospital in Parnell, Auckland, aged 60 years.

After he returned to Auckland, Lusk "lived a retired life". In the last years of his life he was "almost blind".

Hugh Hart Lusk died on 8 September 1926 in Auckland, aged 88 years. He was buried in the Mount Victoria cemetery at Devonport, a harbourside suburb of Auckland.

== Publications ==
Books and pamphlets written by Hugh H. Lusk:

- The Outlook of Labour: A Pamphlet on the Relations between Labour and Capital (1891), Sydney: W. M. MacLardy.
- Our Foes at Home (1899), New York: Doubleday & McClure Co.
- Family Suffrage in New Zealand (c. 1907), Warren, Ohio: National American Woman Suffrage Association.
- Prosperous New Zealand (c. 1909), New York: National American Woman Suffrage Association.
- Social Welfare in New Zealand: The Result of Twenty Years of Progressive Social Legislation and its Significance for the United States and Other Countries (1913), New York: Sturgis & Walter.

Articles written by Hugh H. Lusk:

- 'Maori Mahommedanism', essay published in The Fortnightly Review (London: Chapman & Hall), 1 November 1865.
- 'In the Suburbs of Munich' (1895), The Monthly Illustrator, Vol. 5, No. 17 (September 1895), pages 306–317; with photographs by Allen B. Doggett.
- 'Remarkable Success of Woman's Enfranchisement in New Zealand' (1897), The Forum, No. 23 (April 1897), pages 173–183.
- 'Single Tax in Operation' (1897), The Arena, No. 18 (July 1897), pages 79–89.
- 'The Problem of the Philippines' (1898), The North American Review, Vol. 167, No. 502 (September 1898), pages 257–277; co-authored with Charles W. Dilke and John Barrett.
- 'Industrial Emancipation in New Zealand' (1899), Outlook, No. 62 (May 1899), pages 167–170.
- 'Old-Age Pensions in New Zealand' (1899), Harper's Weekly, No. 43 (August 1899), page 781.
- 'The Highways of the People' (1899), The North American Review, Vol. 169, No. 517 (December 1899), pages 873–884.
- 'The Commonwealth of Australia' (1899), The Forum, December 1899, pages 481–492.
- 'The New Power in the South Pacific' (1901), The North American Review, Vol. 172, No. 530 (January 1901), pages 103–112.
- 'Chinese Exclusion in Australia' (1902), The North American Review, Vol. 174, No. 544 (March 1902), pages 368–375.
- 'Australia's Second Parliament' (1904), The North American Review, Vol. 178, No. 569 (April 1904), pages 597–604.
- 'The Australian Telegraph System' (1904), The North American Review, Vol. 179, No. 576 (November 1904), pages 741–747.
- 'The Real Yellow Peril' (1907), The North American Review, Vol. 186, No. 624 (November 1907), pages 375–383.
- 'The Woman's Vote. Some Side-lights from New Zealand's Experience' (1910), The North American Review, Vol. 192, No. 656 (July 1910), pages 107–116.
- 'Australia's New Capital' (1913), The Forum, November 1913, pages 631–640.

Publications by Lusk, written under the pseudonym Owen Hall:

- The Track of a Storm, a convict novel; published by in 1895 by Chatto & Windus (London, England) and J. B. Lippincott Company (Philadelphia, Pennsylvania, USA).
- Flotsom (1896), published in Lippincott's for April, April 1896, J. B. Lippincott Co.
- Jetsam (1897; London: Chatto & Windus).
- 'A Night in Devil's Gully' (pages 272–276), 'Imperialism. – An Estimate' (pages 389–396) and 'The Samoan Feast of Pilaui' (pages 838–843); short stories and articles in Lippincott's Monthly Magazine, January to June 1899, Vol. LXIII.
- Eureka (1899), one of the earliest Australian science-fiction novels; published by Chatto & Windus (London) in 1899; serialised in The Pittsburg Press, 13 April 1901 to 16 May 1901.
- Hernando (1902; London: Chatto & Windus).
- 'After Many Years' (1904), five autobiographical articles published in the Auckland Star from 30 January to 20 February 1904, detailing the author's impressions of New Zealand after an absence of about twenty years.
- A Fight to a Finish (1904), a story of the fighting between Maoris and white settlers in the Waikato Valley in 1863; serialised in the New Zealand Mail, 6 April to 29 June 1904, and the Auckland Star, April to July 1904.
- The Cruise of the Flying Fish (1907), serialised in The Auckland Star in October 1907.
- Lumi's Lagoon (1908), serialised in The Auckland Star from 26 September to 5 October 1908.

== Notes ==
A.Hugh and his elder brother, Daniel, married sisters. Four months prior to the marriage of Hugh Lusk and Mary Anne Butler, Daniel Lusk had married Mary's elder sister Ellen in the same church at Mangōnui.

B.Two of the sons of Hugh and Mary Lusk, Hugh and Harold, played first-class cricket for New Zealand.

C.In 1897 it was reported that Lusk's school history of Australia, completed in 1890, was not yet issued to public schools, "for which purpose it was originally written". The book was "the subject of much Parliamentary and other inquiry and comment". The original work had been revised on three occasions by different people, or (as one article put it), "secretly licked into presentable shape". In February 1900 it was reported that the volume of Australian history, originally written by Lusk and "re-written by Joseph Finney, B.A.", has been printed as a proof copy in book form and presented to John Perry, the Minister of Public Education. Perry intended to have the book "carefully 'edited' before it is issued to the public". Finney, the final editor of the work, was a lecturer at the Public Training School and master of the Fort Street Practising School. The book was finally published in 1901 as The History of the Australian Colonies, with the authorship acknowledged as "compiled by Joseph Finney" (without any apparent reference to Lusk).
