= Benjamin Harris (New Zealand politician) =

New Zealand politician

Benjamin Harris (1836 – 12 February 1928) was a 19th-century Member of Parliament in New Zealand. In 1893 he appears to have been a Liberal Party supporter.

== Early life ==
Harris was born at Lisburn, Ireland, in 1836. The family migrated to England, Canada, and Australia, before settling in New Zealand in East Tāmaki in 1847. Early in his life, he had a farm in Pukekohe. With the outbreak of the New Zealand Wars, he joined the Otahuhu Cavalry Volunteers in 1861, and, as The Press in Christchurch as a contemporary source records, "for a few years subsequently galloped about slaying Maoris [sic] in the interests of settlement, civilisation, and Christianity." He returned to his farm in 1866 and married the following year. The locality of Harrisville was named after him as he was the major landowner.

== Political career ==
New Zealand Parliament
Years	Term	Electorate	Party
1879–1881	7th	Franklin	Independent
1881–1882	8th	Franklin North	Independent
1882–1884	8th	Franklin North	Independent
1893–1896	12th	Franklin	Liberal

He represented the Ramarama electorate on the Auckland Provincial Council from October 1874 until the abolition of provincial councils two years later.

He represented South Auckland electorates; Franklin from 1879 to 1881; and then the replacement electorate of Franklin North from 1881. His 1881 election was declared void in 1882, but he won the subsequent 1882 by-election. In 1884 he was defeated. He contested the 1890 election in the reconstituted Franklin electorate, but was defeated by Ebenezer Hamlin.

Harris then represented the Franklin electorate from 1893 to 1896, when he was again defeated, by future Prime Minister William Massey.

From 1895 until 1896 he was the Liberal Party's junior whip.

On 3 February 1897, he was appointed to the Legislative Council. At the end of the seven-year terms, he was reappointed in 1904, 1911 and 1918. He resigned on 20 June 1923.

== Later life and death ==
Late in his life, he lived in Clyde Street in Epsom. He died at his home, Taumaihi, on 12 February 1928 and was buried at Pukekohe Cemetery. He was survived by his wife Jane, three daughters and one son.

== Notes ==
New Zealand Parliament
New constituency	Member of Parliament for Franklin North; 1881–1884	Succeeded by Frank Buckland
