= Franklin South =

Franklin South was a parliamentary electorate in the North Island of New Zealand from 1881 to 1890. During the three parliamentary terms of its existence, the electorate was represented by Ebenezer Hamlin.

== Population centres ==
The previous electoral redistribution was undertaken in 1875 for the 1875–1876 election. In the six years since, New Zealand's European population had increased by 65%. In the 1881 electoral redistribution, the House of Representatives increased the number of European representatives to 91 (up from 84 since the 1875–76 election). The number of Māori electorates was held at four. The House further decided that electorates should not have more than one representative, which led to 22 new electorates being formed, including Franklin South, which necessitated a major disruption to existing boundaries. Basically, the former Franklin electorate was split up into Franklin North and Franklin South.

Franklin South originally included the towns of Pukekohe and Waiuku. It covered the area from the West Coast to the Firth of Thames. In 1887 with the growth of Auckland, Papakura was transferred from Franklin North.

In the 1890 electoral redistribution, the House of Representatives reduced its membership from 91 to 70, which caused significant changes to electorate boundaries. Franklin South was abolished and most of its area went to the reconstituted Franklin electorate, but Papakura went to the northern neighbour again. The new Manukau electorate covered Franklin North and include Papakura.

== History ==
The electorate was represented by one Member of Parliament, Ebenezer Hamlin.

=== Election results ===
Key

Independent

Election	Winner
1881 election	Ebenezer Hamlin
1884 election	Ebenezer Hamlin
1887 election	Ebenezer Hamlin
(Electorate abolished 1890, see Franklin)
