= Ebenezer Hamlin =

New Zealand politician

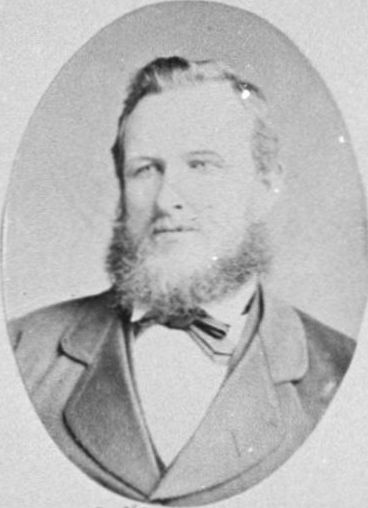
- Ebenezer Hamlin in 1882

5th Chairman of Committees
- In office 30 May 1882 – 3 October 1890
- Preceded by: Arthur Seymour
- Succeeded by: Westby Perceval

Member of the New Zealand Parliament for Franklin
- In office 18 January 1876 – 8 December 1881
- Preceded by: William Buckland; Joseph May
- Succeeded by: Constituency abolished
- In office 5 December 1890 – 8 November 1893
- Preceded by: New constituency
- Succeeded by: Benjamin Harris

Member of the New Zealand Parliament for Franklin South
- In office 9 December 1881 – 4 December 1890
- Preceded by: New constituency
- Succeeded by: Constituency abolished

Personal details
- Born: 1844 Orua, Manukau Harbour, New Zealand
- Died: 4 June 1900 (aged 55–56) Remuera, Auckland, New Zealand

Ebenezer Hamlin (1844 – 4 June 1900) was a member of parliament in New Zealand, and an independent conservative.

== Early life and family ==
Hamlin was born in Orua on the Manukau Harbour to the Rev James Hamlin, a missionary who had arrived in New Zealand in 1823 with the Church Missionary Society. He was the ninth and youngest son of the reverend. He fought in the New Zealand Wars in the 1860s, and was a major in the Territorial Army. On 28 April 1868, Hamlin married Sarah Grace Barriball, the daughter of Charles Barriball of Waiuku, at her father's house near Waiuku (Barriball Road in Waiuku commemorates the location of the family's land).

== Political career ==
New Zealand Parliament
Years	Term	Electorate	Party
1876–1879	6th	Franklin	Independent
1879–1881	7th	Franklin	Independent
1881–1884	8th	Franklin South	Independent
1884–1887	9th	Franklin South	Independent
1887–1890	10th	Franklin South	Independent
1890–1893	11th	Franklin	Independent

Electors from Waiuku presented a requisition to Hamlin in November 1869 to stand for election in the Raglan electorate for the Auckland Provincial Council, which he accepted. Three representatives were elected on 20 December, and of four candidates, Joseph May came first and Hamlin came second. Hamlin remained a member of the provincial council until the abolition of provincial government in 1875.

He represented the South Auckland seats of Franklin in the New Zealand House of Representatives from 1876 to 1881; and then the replacement electorate of Franklin South from 1881 to 1890. He then represented the reconstituted Franklin electorate from 1890 to 1893 when he retired. He was never defeated.

He served as Chairman of Committees from 1882 to 1890.

== Death ==
Hamlin died at his residence in the Auckland suburb of Remuera on 4 June 1900, and he was buried in the St Mark's Church cemetery, Remuera. He was survived by his wife, three sons, and seven daughters.

== Notes ==
Political offices
Preceded by Arthur Seymour	Chairman of Committees of the House of Representatives; 1882–1890	Succeeded by Westby Perceval
New Zealand Parliament
New constituency	Member of Parliament for Franklin South; 1881–1890	Constituency abolished
