= William Massey =

Prime minister of New Zealand from 1912 to 1925

The Right Honourable William Massey
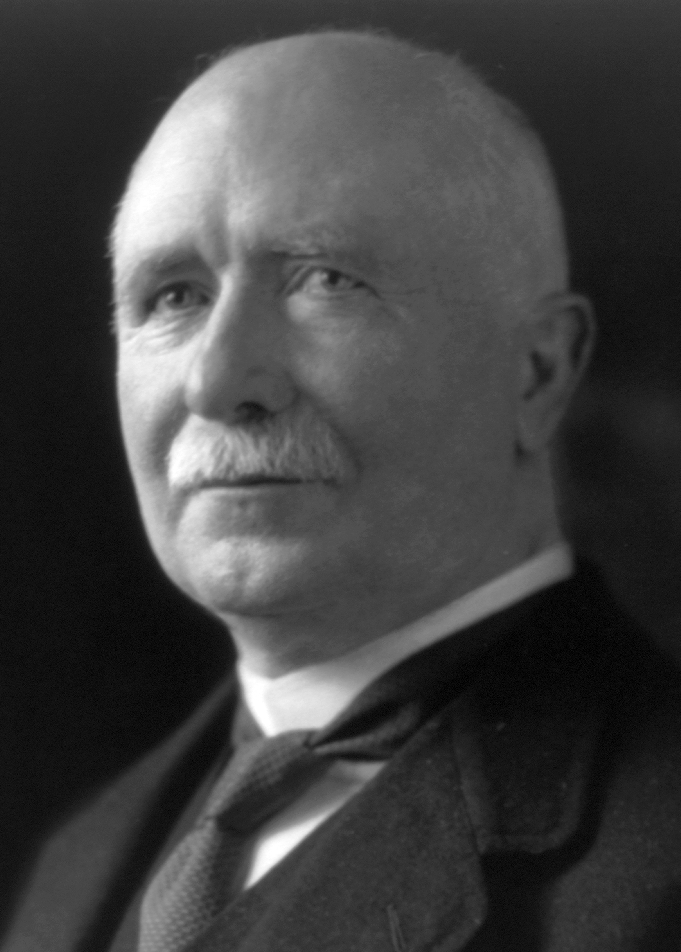
- Massey in 1919

19th Prime Minister of New Zealand
- In office 10 July 1912 – 10 May 1925
- Monarch: George V
- Governors-General: John Dickson-Poynder; Arthur Foljambe; John Jellicoe; Charles Fergusson
- Preceded by: Thomas Mackenzie
- Succeeded by: Sir Francis Bell

5th Leader of the Opposition
- In office 11 September 1903 – 10 July 1912
- Deputy: James Allen
- Preceded by: William Russell
- Succeeded by: Joseph Ward

Member of the New Zealand Parliament for Franklin
- In office 4 December 1896 – 10 May 1925
- Preceded by: Benjamin Harris
- Succeeded by: Ewen McLennan

Personal details
- Born: William Ferguson Massey; 26 March 1856 Limavady, County Londonderry, Ireland
- Died: 10 May 1925 (aged 69) Wellington, New Zealand
- Party: Reform (from 1909)
- Spouse: Christina Allan Paul (m. 1882)
- Children: 7, including Walter and Jack
- Relatives: Stan Goosman (nephew)

William Ferguson Massey PC (26 March 1856 – 10 May 1925) was a politician who served as the 19th prime minister of New Zealand from May 1912 to May 1925. He was the founding leader of the Reform Party, New Zealand's second organised political party, from 1909 until his death.

Massey was born in Limavady in County Londonderry in Ireland. After migrating to New Zealand in 1870, Massey farmed near Auckland (earning his later nickname, Farmer Bill) and assumed leadership in farmers' organisations. He entered parliament in 1894 as a conservative, and from 1894 to 1912 was a leader of the conservative opposition to the Liberal ministries of Richard Seddon and Joseph Ward. Massey became the first Reform Party Prime Minister after he led a successful motion of no confidence against the Liberal government. Throughout his political career, Massey was known for the particular support he showed for agrarian interests, as well as his opposition to organised labour. He pledged New Zealand's support for Britain during the First World War.

Massey led his Reform Party through four elections, although only the 1919 election was a decisive victory over all other parties. Following increasingly poor health in his fourth term, Massey died in office. After Richard Seddon, he is the second-longest-serving prime minister of New Zealand.

A state funeral for Massey was held on 14 May 1925, followed by a burial at Point Halswell, at a site that became the Massey memorial in 1930.

== Early life ==
Massey was born in 1856 into a Protestant farming family, and grew up in Limavady, County Londonderry, Ireland. His father John Massey and his mother Marianne (or Mary Anne, née Ferguson) were tenant farmers who also owned a small property. His family arrived in New Zealand on 21 October 1862 on board the Indian Empire as Nonconformist settlers, although Massey remained in Ireland for a further eight years to complete his education. He resided for a time with his grandmother Elizabeth Ferguson (née Barnett) at her home at Kennaught, Limavady, attending Limavady National School. Subsequently, Massey went to live with his uncle Matthew Ferguson at Sheephill, Ballykelly and from there he went to school in Derry. After arriving on 10 December 1870 on the City of Auckland, Massey worked as a farmhand for some years before acquiring his own farm in Māngere in 1876. In 1882 he married his neighbour's daughter, Christina Allan Paul. They had seven children.

== Early political career ==
Massey gradually became more prominent in his community. This was partly due to his civic involvement in the school board, the debating society and farming associations. Because of his prominence in these circles, he became involved in political debate, working on behalf of rural conservatives against the Liberal Party government of John Ballance. Massey was a member of the Orange Order, Oddfellows, and Freemasons, and espoused British Israelite ideas.

In 1893 Massey stood as a candidate in the general election in the Franklin electorate, losing to the Liberal candidate, Benjamin Harris. In early 1894 he was invited to contest a by-election in the neighbouring electorate of Waitemata, and was victorious. In the 1896 election he stood for the Franklin electorate, which he represented until he died in 1925.

== Opposition ==
New Zealand Parliament
Years	Term	Electorate	Party
1894–1896	12th	Waitemata	Conservative
1896–1899	13th	Franklin	Conservative
1899–1902	14th	Franklin	Conservative
1902–1905	15th	Franklin	Conservative
1905–1908	16th	Franklin	Conservative
1908–1909	17th	Franklin	Conservative
1909–1911	Changed allegiance to:		Reform
1911–1914	18th	Franklin	Reform
1914–1919	19th	Franklin	Reform
1919–1922	20th	Franklin	Reform
1922–1925	21st	Franklin	Reform

Massey joined the ranks of the (mostly conservative) independent MPs opposing the Liberal Party, led by Richard Seddon. They were poorly organised and dispirited, and had little chance of unseating the Liberals. William Russell, the Leader of the Opposition, was able to command only 15 votes. Massey brought increased vigour to the conservative faction and became opposition whip.

By June 1900, following a heavy defeat at the 1899 general election, the opposition strength fell considerably. The conservative MPs could not agree on a new leader after holding their first caucus of the session. James William Thomson, rather than Russell, chaired the meeting where it was decided to not elect a new leader, but each MP should be free to criticise the government in their own manner. The meeting also resolved that Massey, as chief whip, should be empowered to call the Opposition caucus together at any time should he wish. For over two years the conservatives were virtually leaderless and many despaired of ever toppling the Liberal Party. Massey, as chief whip, informally continued to fill the role as leader and eventually succeeded Russell as Leader of the Opposition formally in September 1903.

As leader, the conservatives rallied for a time, though support for the Liberals increased markedly during the Second Boer War, leaving the conservatives devastated at the 1902 general election. Massey's political career survived the period: despite a challenge by William Herries, he remained the most prominent opponent to the Liberal Party.

After Seddon's death the Liberals were led by Joseph Ward, who proved more vulnerable to Massey's attacks. In particular, Massey made gains by claiming that alleged corruption and cronyism within the civil service was ignored or abetted by the Liberal government. His conservative politics also benefited him when voters grew concerned about militant unionism and the supposed threat of socialism.

=== Reform Party ===
In February 1909, Massey announced the creation of the Reform Party from his New Zealand Political Reform League. The party was to be led by him and backed by his conservative colleagues.

In the 1911 election the Reform Party won more seats than the Liberal Party but did not gain an absolute majority. The Liberals, relying on support from independents who had not joined Reform, were able to stay in power until the following year, when they lost a vote of confidence.

== Prime minister ==
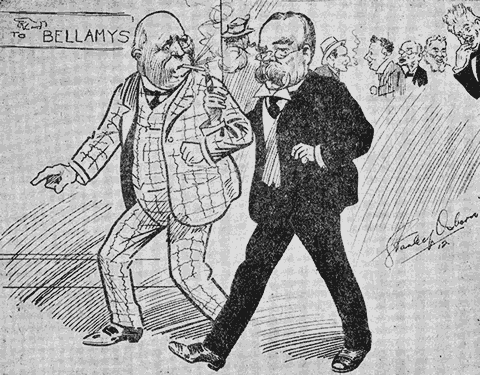
Massey and James Allen head for Bellamy's to celebrate their assumption of government. New Zealand Spectator, 13 July 1912.

Massey was sworn in as prime minister on 10 July 1912. Two days later it was reported in the press on 12 July that he had accepted the appointment of Honorary Commandant of the Auckland District of the Legion of Frontiersmen. Some members of the Reform Party grew increasingly frustrated at Massey's dominance of the party. He earned the enmity of many workers with his harsh response to miners' and waterfront workers' strikes in 1912 and 1913. The use of force to deal with the strikers made Massey an object of hatred for the emerging left-wing, but conservatives (many of whom believed that the unions were controlled by the far left) generally supported him, saying that his methods were necessary. His association with the Legion of Frontiersmen assisted him greatly during this period as a number of mounted units, including Levin Troop, rode to Wellington in mufti and assisted as Special Constables. In the Levin Troop was a young Bernard Freyberg, who would shortly earn the Victoria Cross near Beaumont Hamel.

Amongst the first Acts enacted by Massey's government was one that "enabled some 13,000 Crown tenants to purchase their own farms."

=== First World War ===
All we are and all we have is at the disposal of the British Government.

— Cable from Massey to the British Government, 1914

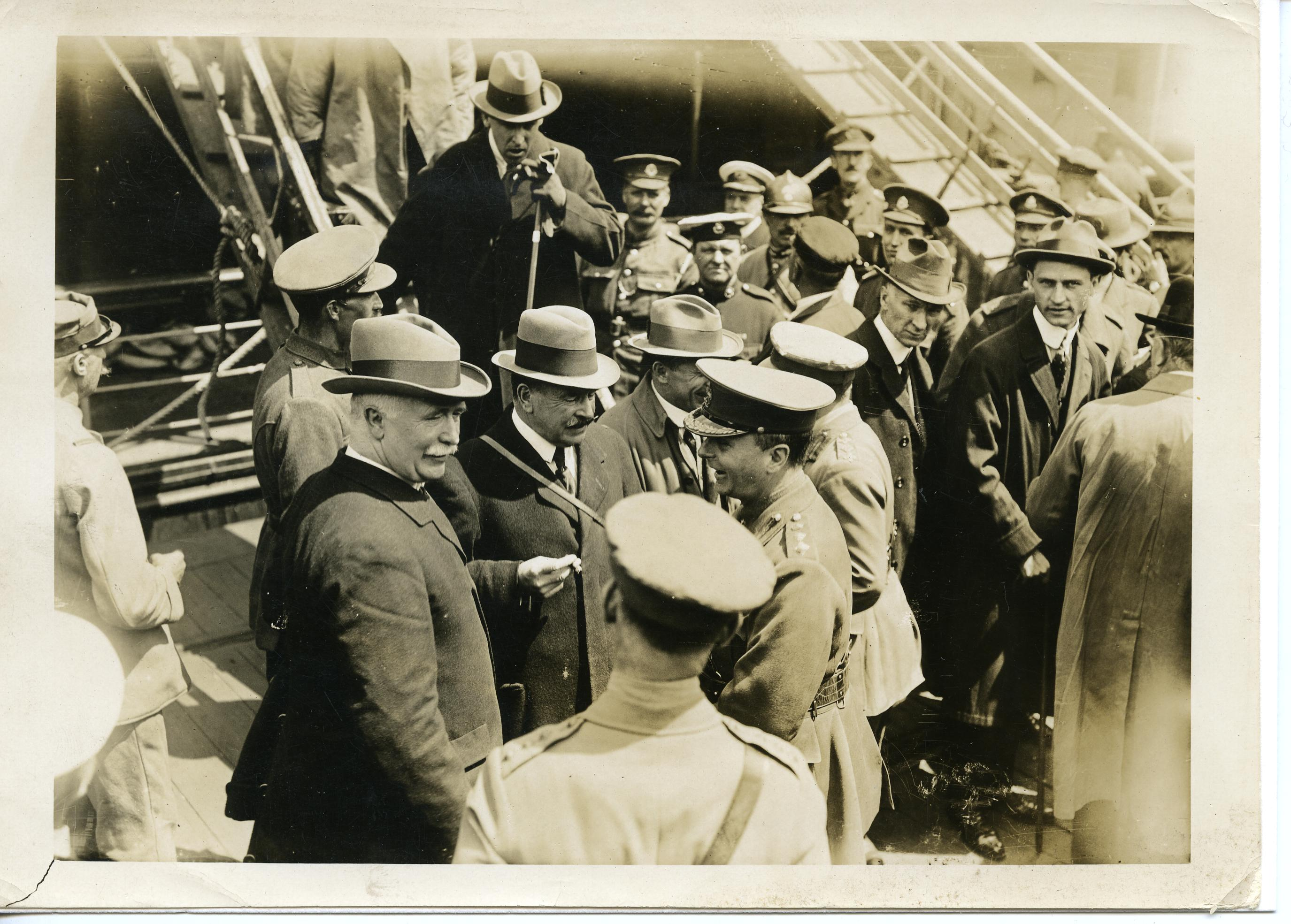
On 29 June 1918, Massey and Ward began a visit to New Zealand troops in France. This photo shows them on their arrival in Boulogne, 1918.

The outbreak of the First World War diverted attention from these matters. The 1914 election left Massey and his political opponents stalemated in parliament, with neither side possessing enough support to govern effectively. Massey reluctantly invited Joseph Ward of the Liberals to form a war-time coalition, created in 1915. While Massey remained prime minister, Ward gained de facto status as joint leader. Massey and Ward travelled to Britain several times, both during and after the war, to discuss military co-operation and peace settlements. During his first visit, Massey visited New Zealand troops, listening to their complaints sympathetically. This angered some officials, who believed that Massey undermined the military leadership by conceding (in contrast to the official line) that conditions for the troops were unsatisfactory. The war reinforced Massey's strong belief in the British Empire and New Zealand's links with it. He attended the Paris Peace Conference in 1919 and signed the Treaty of Versailles on behalf of New Zealand. Although turning down knighthoods and a peerage, he accepted appointment as a Grand Officer of the Order of the Crown (Belgium) from the King of Belgium in March 1921 and a Grand Officer of the Legion of Honour by the President of France in October 1921.

Massey has also been criticised for his policies regarding phosphate mining in Nauru, with Massey University scholar Matt Wynyard claiming he was "behind its utter devastation".

==== Coalition with the Liberals ====
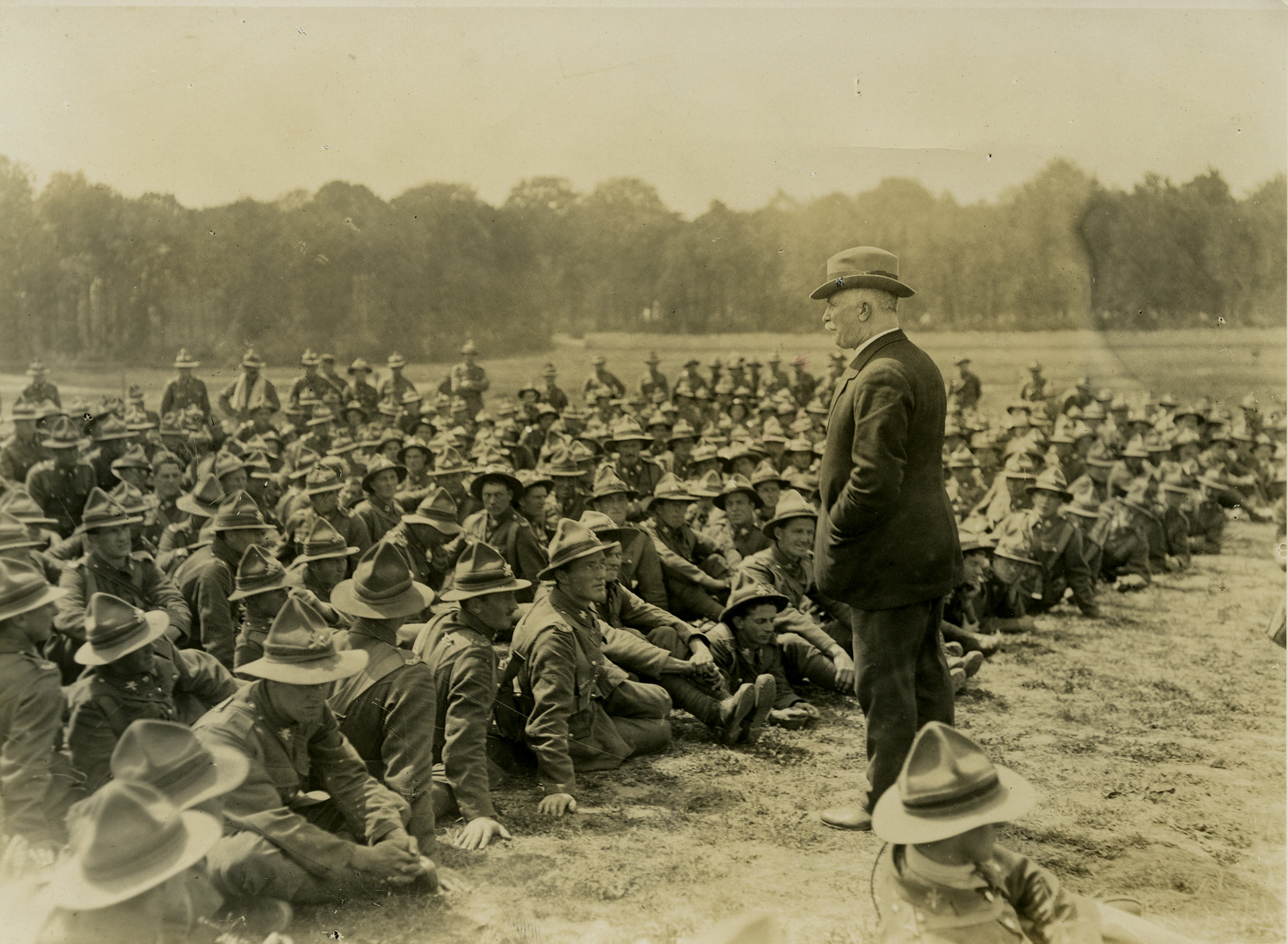
Massey addressing New Zealand machine gunners at Bois-De-Warnimont, France, 30 June 1918

Partly because of the difficulty in obtaining consensus to implement meaningful policies, the coalition government had grown increasingly unpopular by the end of the war. Massey was particularly worried by the rise of the Labour Party, which was growing increasingly influential. Massey also found himself fighting off criticism from within his own party, including charges that he was ignoring rural concerns. He dissolved the coalition in 1919, and fought both the Liberals and Labour on a platform of patriotism, stability, support for farmers, and a public works programme. He successfully gained a majority.

=== The Red Scare ===
According to New Zealand historian Tony Wilson, Massey was known for his anti-Bolshevik and anti-Soviet sentiments. He disliked domestic socialist elements like the "Red Feds", the predecessor to the New Zealand Federation of Labour, and the New Zealand Labour Party. As prime minister, Massey was opposed to Communist influence. He regarded the Red Terror (1919–20) in the Soviet Union, which followed the Bolshevik Revolution in 1917, as proof of the "inherently oppressive orientation" of socialism. In response to the Red Scare the government passed the War Regulations Continuance Act, which continued wartime emergency regulations including censorship. This led to a ban on Communist-oriented literature, which continued to 1935.

=== 1922 election ===
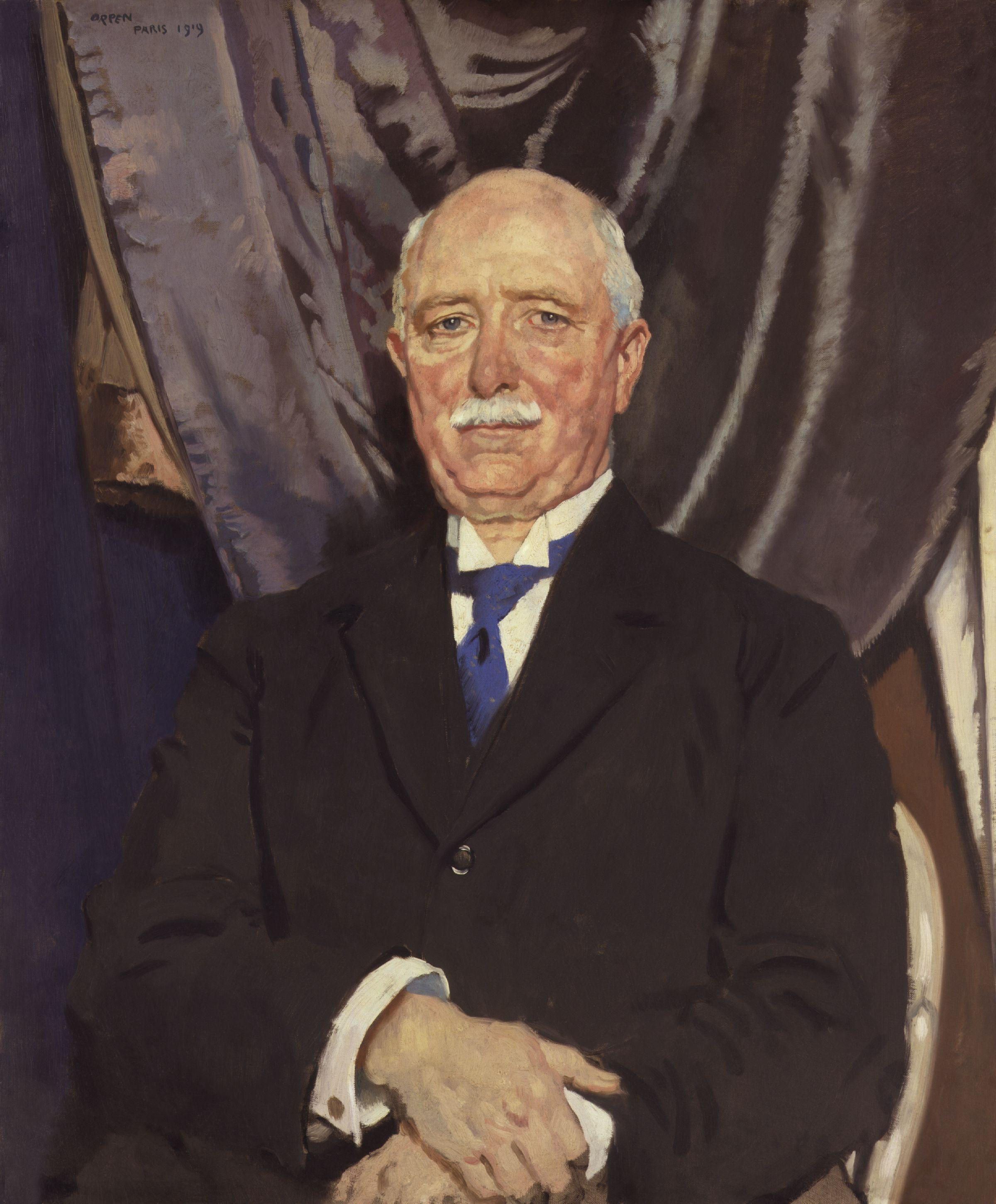
Portrait of Massey by Sir William Orpen. Undated.

Economic problems lessened support for Reform. In the 1922 election Massey lost his majority, and was forced to negotiate with independents to keep his government alive. He was also alarmed by the success of Labour, which was now only five seats behind the Liberals. He began to believe that the Liberals would eventually disappear, with their supporters being split, the socially liberal wing to Labour and the economically liberal wing to Reform. He set about trying to ensure that Reform's gain would be the greater.

In 1924 cancer forced him to relinquish many of his official duties, and the following year he died.

== Legacy ==
The Massey Memorial was erected as his mausoleum in Wellington, paid for mostly by public subscription. Massey University is named after him, the name chosen because the university had a focus on agricultural science, matching Massey's own farming background. The Massey district was named after Massey during his tenure as prime minister and still retains the name.

=== Honours ===
- France: Grand Officer of the Legion of Honour
- Belgium: Grand Officer of the Order of the Crown

== Family ==
His widow, Christina, was awarded the GBE in 1926, one year after his death.

Two of his sons became Reform MPs: Jack (1885–1964), who represented his father's Franklin electorate from 1928 to 1935, and from 1938 to 1957 for National; and Walter William (1882–1959), who represented Hauraki from 1931 to 1935.

His son Frank George Massey (1887–1975) enlisted in World War I, and transferred to the British Expeditionary Force where he commanded a battalion as a Major.

== Bibliography ==
- Wilson, Jim (1985) [First ed. published 1913]. New Zealand Parliamentary Record, 1840–1984 (4th ed.). Wellington: V.R. Ward, Govt. Printer. OCLC 154283103.

Government offices
Preceded by Thomas Mackenzie	Prime Minister of New Zealand; 1912–1925	Succeeded by Francis Bell
Political offices
Preceded by William Herries	Minister of Railways; 1919–1922	Succeeded by David Guthrie
Preceded by Thomas Wilford	Minister of Police; 1919–1920	Succeeded by Ernest Lee
New Zealand Parliament
Preceded by Richard Monk	Member of Parliament for Waitemata; 1894–1896	Succeeded by Richard Monk
Preceded by Benjamin Harris	Member of Parliament for Franklin; 1896–1925	Succeeded by Ewen McLennan
