= RealNZ =

New Zealand company

- Type: Private
- Industry: Tourism, travel
- Predecessors: Wayfare Group, Real Journeys
- Founded: 2021
- Headquarters: Queenstown
- Area served: Stewart Island, Fiordland, Doubtful Sound, Te Anau, Milford Sound, Queenstown, Wānaka, Christchurch
- Key people: Dave Beeche (CEO)
- Website: www.realnz.com/en/

RealNZ is a New Zealand tourism company based in Queenstown. The company offers a range of travel, cruises and excursions in Queenstown, Milford Sound / Piopiotahi, Te Anau, Fiordland and Stewart Island / Rakiura. It also operates two skifields Cardrona Alpine Resort, and Treble Cone. The company is the successor of a series of acquisitions in the South Island tourist sector over more than 60 years. The brand RealNZ was launched in October 2021 to bring together multiple brands and businesses including Real Journeys that were previously part of the Wayfare Group, although some of the businesses have retained individual branding.

== History ==
Les Hutchins and his wife Olive originally bought the Manapouri-Doubtful Sound tour company in 1954. Their next acquisition was the company Fiordland Travel that had been set up to provide tours of the Te Ana-au glowworm caves. In the late 1960s, the Hutchins bought the TSS Earnslaw. Then they moved into Milford Sound / Piopiotahi and competed with government tourism. From 2002, Fiordland Travel Ltd operated all tourist excursions under the Real Journeys brand, and the company name was changed to Real Journeys Ltd in 2006.

In 2002, Les Hutchins was made a Distinguished Companion of the New Zealand Order of Merit for services to conservation and tourism.

A separate company Fiordland Explorer Cruises was first incorporated in July 2012, but the name was changed to Go Orange in August 2013.

The purchase of the Cardrona Alpine Resort ski area in 2013 is one of its most significant acquisitions. Real Journeys purchased Christchurch's International Antarctic Centre in 2015. The group of companies owned by Real Journeys include the Stewart Island Experience launched in 2004 and Wild Kiwi Encounter, operated as a joint tourism venture with the Rakiura Maori Lands Trust, which was purchased in 2016.

Queenstown Rafting, in which Real Journeys had been a 50% partner since 1996, was bought outright in 2016 along with the company's associate coach services company Kiwi Discovery.

The Wayfare Group was formed in 2018 as a holding company for the multiple offerings, but was relaunched as RealNZ on 1 October 2021.

The majority of the RealNZ company is still owned by the Hutchins family, through a holding company Real Group.

=== Air tourism ===
In 1987, Fiordland Travel established a sightseeing and shuttle air service between Queenstown and Milford Sound using Cessna aircraft initially, followed by the introduction of Nomad aircraft. In 1993, the Fiordland Travel airline operation and the Mount Cook Airlines service to Milford merged to form a joint venture named Milford Sound Flightseeing. Fiordland Travel subsequently purchased the company outright. After the re-branding as Real Journeys, it combined its fixed wing airline services with those of Totally Tourism in another joint venture called Milford Sound Flights. Totally Tourism's 50 per cent shareholding was subsequently purchased by Skyline Enterprises, and in late 2015 Real Journeys sold its half share to Skyline, retaining a supply agreement for air services to Milford.

=== International Antarctic Centre ===
In October 2015, Real Journeys purchased the International Antarctic Centre from Christchurch Airport. The company announced in July 2023 that they intended to sell the International Antarctic Centre. In October 2024 it was announced that the facility had been sold to the owners of the Willowbank Wildlife Reserve for an undisclosed sum.

== Management ==
The Chief Executive of the Real Journeys group (rebranded as Wayfare Group) between 2012 and 2020 was Richard Lauder, who led the group through a period of major acquisitions. In October 2020, Stephen England-Hall who was previously the Chief Executive of Tourism New Zealand, announced that he would be taking up the Chief Executive role. He resigned in March 2023.

In the 2021 New Year Honours, the General Manager of Real Journeys and Go Orange, Paul Norris, was appointed a Member of the New Zealand Order of Merit, for services to the tourism industry and conservation.

== Travel and excursions ==
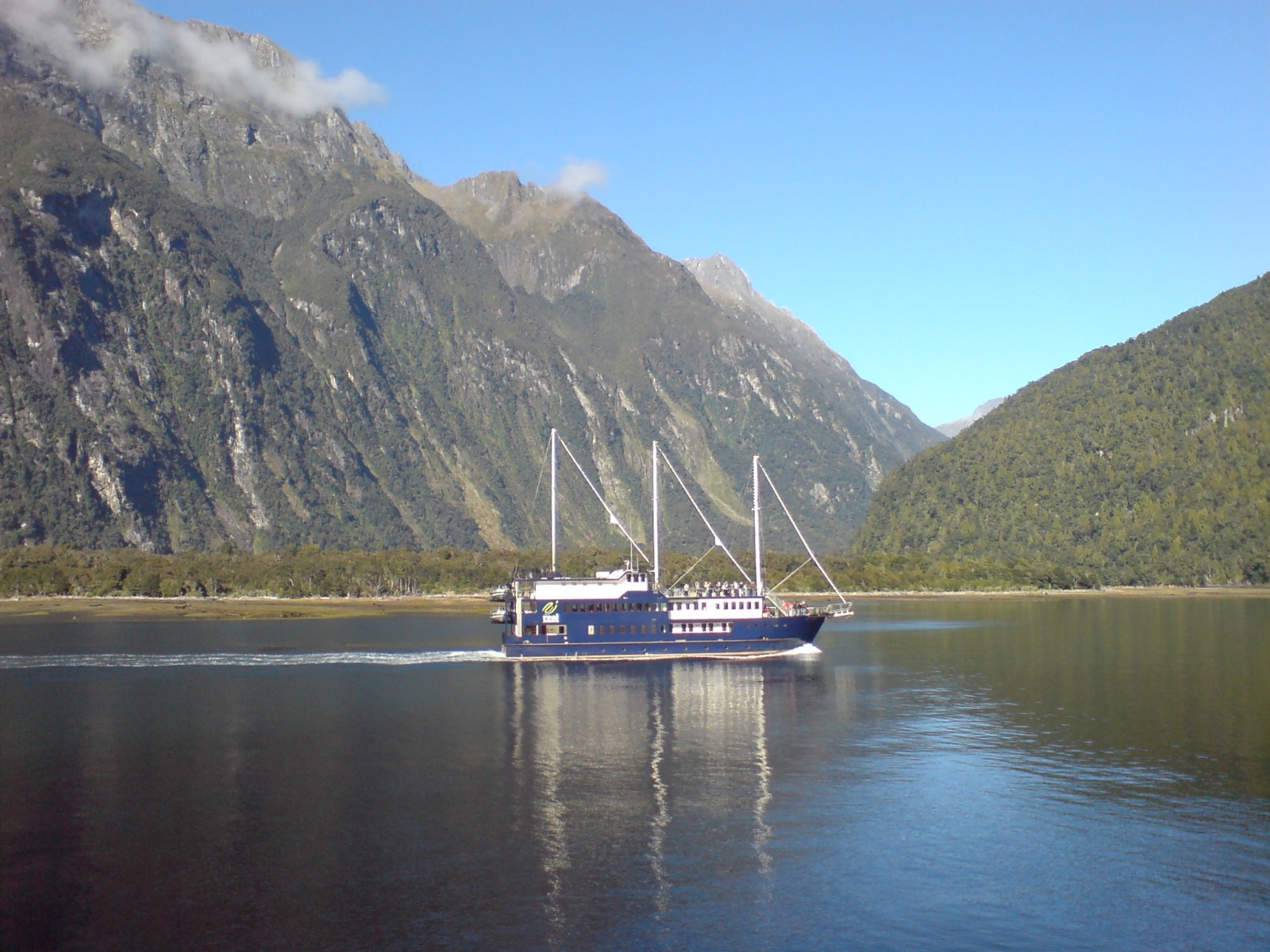
Real Journeys Milford Sound cruise vessel

The company offers a wide range of tourist travel, excursion and adventure activities including:

- cruises across Lake Wakatipu on the historic steamer TSS Earnslaw
- day visits to Walter Peak Station
- day trips to Milford Sound / Piopiotahi
- excursions to Lake Te Anau's Te Ana-au Caves
- launch trips across Lake Manapouri
- overnight boat trips in Milford Sound and Doubtful Sound / Patea
- week long expedition cruises to Preservation Inlet and Stewart Island
- whitewater rafting
- jet boating
- kayaking
- coach connections in Queenstown, Te Anau, and Milford and Doubtful sounds.

Rafting trips include the Shotover, Kawarau and Landsborough Rivers.

From October 2021, the experiences previously marketed under the Real Journeys and Go Orange brands were consolidated under the RealNZ brand.

=== Vintage steamship ===
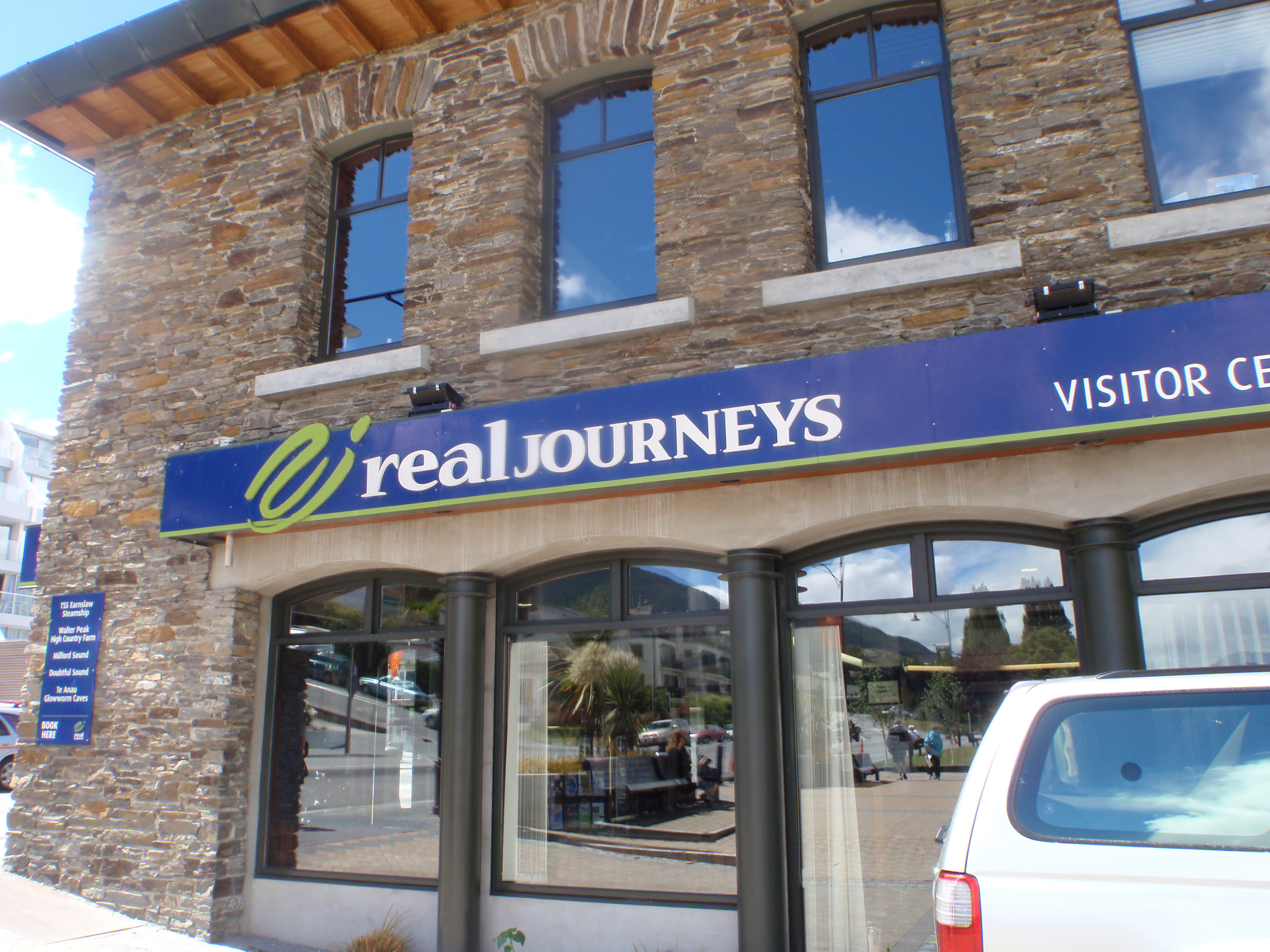
Real Journeys office on Steamer Wharf in Queenstown

The TSS Earnslaw was launched by the Government on Lake Wakatipu in 1912, and provided services transporting sheep, cattle and passengers to the surrounding high country stations, under the ownership of the New Zealand Railways Department. However, by the 1960s there was talk of scuttling the vessel. She was chartered to a private syndicate at the eleventh hour on 1 January 1969, but the new ownership was short lived, Fiordland Travel then applied for and was granted the lease of the historic steamer, and on 12 December 1969 began transporting freight and passengers to the head of the lake under their colours. In 1982 the company purchased the vessel outright.

In 1991, Fiordland Travel secured the lease of the Walter Peak high country farm tourist operation and the TSS Earnslaw began daily excursions to the station on the western shores of Lake Wakatipu. Visitors to Walter Peak today are offered a farming experience, guided cycling excursions and horse trekking. The TSS Earnslaw also provides transport to the historic Colonel's House restaurant at Walter Peak, a popular dining out venue for visitors and Queenstown residents.

The TSS Earnslaw, is known as the Lady of the Lake, and is one of New Zealand's best known tourism icons. When she celebrated her 100th birthday in October 2012 thousands of people took part in the festivities. TSS Earnslaw is claimed to be the oldest coal-fired passenger steamship in the southern hemisphere still operating as a fully commercial venture. In October 2021, the owners announced that they were investigating carbon-neutral or carbon-zero means of powering the vessel.

== Cardrona Alpine Resort and Treble Cone ==
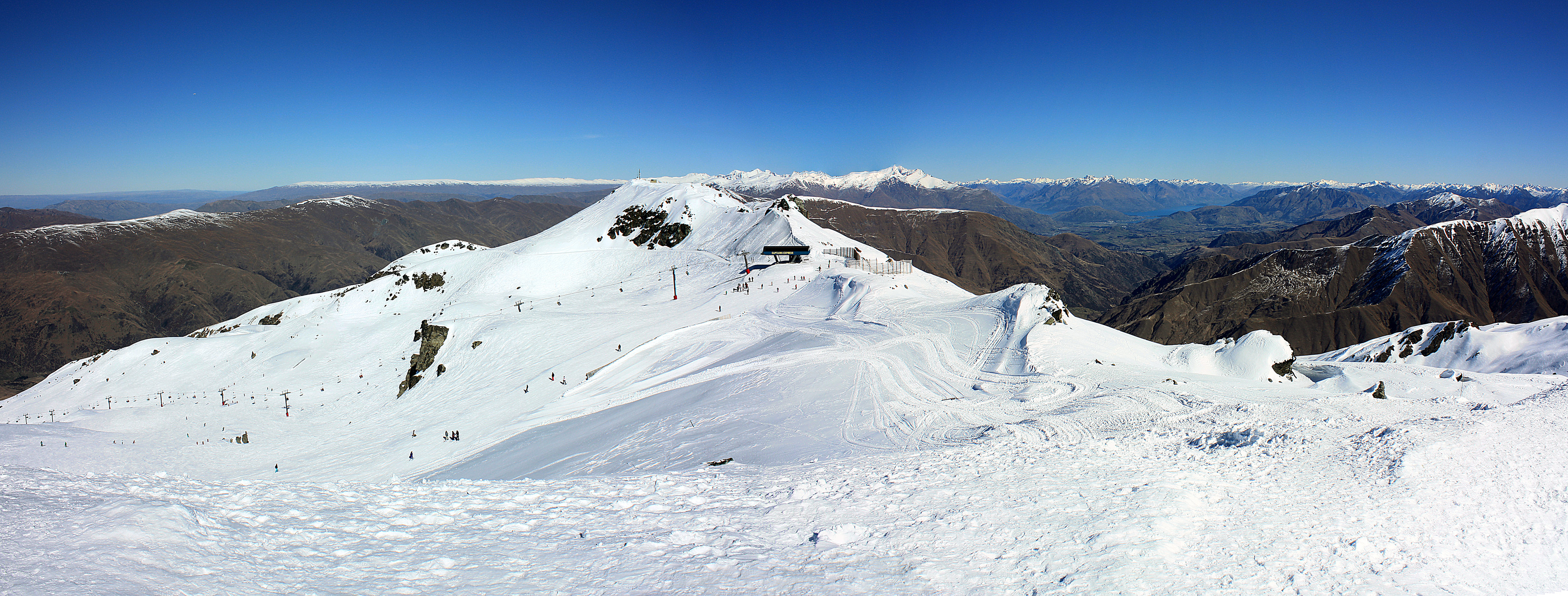
Captains Basin view at Cardrona Skifield

Cardrona is an alpine resort in New Zealand's South Island, near Wānaka. The ski field ranges from 1,260m to 1,860m. The distribution of slopes is 25% beginner, 25% intermediate, 30% advanced and 20% expert.

Cardrona was purchased by Real Journeys in 2013.

In December 2019, the Commerce Commission gave approval for the purchase of Treble Cone Investments Ltd by Cardrona Alpine Resort. In early 2020, Cardrona reported that they were working towards merging the operations and marketing of the Cardrona and Treble Cone ski resorts.

== Conservation initiatives ==
The original founder, Les Hutchins, had a lifetime interest in conservation issues, particularly in Fiordland National Park. Les was appointed as one of the founding Guardians of the Lakes in 1973, and held that position for 26 years. He was also a founding patron of the New Zealand National Parks and Conservation Foundation, and was a member of the New Zealand Conservation Authority for 12 years.

Real Journeys has organised an annual Birds of the Feather charity ball, to help fundraise for the Department of Conservation's work in the area. In 2015, the inaugural ball raised $40,000 for the preservation of the endangered kākāpō. In 2016, the function raised $65,000 for the Tamatea/Dusky Sound Restoration Project. Some of the funds were earmarked for a $300,000 project, adopted by Real Journeys, to make Cooper Island in Dusky Sound predator free.

In 2013 Real Journeys purchased a 155-hectare (380-acre) site it had previously leased at Walter Peak on the far shores of Lake Wakatipu and embarked on a major land restoration project. In 2015, the company was awarded a Department of Conservation Certificate of Appreciation, for its role in clearing the land of vast areas of invasive wilding pines that threaten the Queenstown and Central Otago landscape, and replacing them with native bush and grassland. The Certificate of Appreciation also recognised the company's kākāpō fundraising and awareness projects and relocation support for the rare whio (blue duck) from the Milford Track to near the Routeburn Track to help boost breeding pairs.

The Leslie Hutchins Conservation Fund was set up by Sir Les Hutchins before his death to support efforts to protect and preserve New Zealand's southern lakes and conservation areas. The aim of the fund is also to reduce financial barriers to allow all New Zealanders to experience and enjoy Fiordland, particularly people who are "at risk" or disadvantaged. Every year, the visitors that the company brings to Doubtful Sound contribute more than $50,000 to this fund via a $1 passenger levy. Projects supported in the past include dolphin research, protection programmes for endangered birds, track and interpretation signage, outdoor education camps and wilding pine eradication.

== Awards ==
In 2013, Real Journeys was a winner of the Operator of the Year Award at the Tourism Export Council's annual conference. Real Journeys was a joint winner of the same Operator of the Year award at the Tourism Export Council's conference in 2015.

In 2017, Real Journeys won the People's Choice award at the New Zealand Tourism Awards ceremony held in Christchurch.

Also in 2017, Real Journeys won the Supreme Award at the 20th Diversity Awards run by Diversity Works NZ. The award citation commended Real Journeys for its training initiative that utilises the experience of older workers to provide learning opportunities for young people in Otago and Southland.

The company has also received Certificate of Excellence awards from Trip Advisor for 2016, 2017 and 2018.

Real Journeys won an inaugural Qualmark 100% Pure New Zealand Experience Award in 2019. Only seven companies received this award – from 41 finalists and over 100 entrants.
