= Les Hutchins =

New Zealand tourism operator and conservationist (1924–2003)

Les Hutchins DCNZM OBE JP
- Born: Leslie Hutchins; 8 December 1924; Invercargill, New Zealand
- Died: 19 December 2003 (aged 79); Queenstown, New Zealand
- Occupation: Tourism operator
- Years active: 1954–2003
- Known for: Real Journeys; Guardians of Lake Manapouri
- Spouse: Olive Doreen Simpson (m. 1948)
- Children: 5

Leslie Hutchins DCNZM OBE JP (8 December 1924 – 19 December 2003) was a New Zealand tourism operator and conservationist. Together with his wife, he bought a tourism company in 1954 that is today RealNZ; it still remains mostly in family ownership. Hutchins was one of the founding members of the Save Manapouri campaign and became one of the initial six Guardians of Lake Manapouri.

== Biography ==
Hutchins was born on 8 December 1924 in Invercargill, and was educated at Southland Technical College. In 1948, he married Olive Doreen Simpson, and the couple went on to have five children.

Together with his wife Olive, he purchased some assets and founded the Manapouri-Doubtful Sound Tourist Company in May 1954. In 1966, the Hutchins purchased Fiordland Travel, a tourism company based in Te Anau. In 2002, the company was rebranded to Real Journeys. The tourism company (now branded as RealNZ), is one of the main operators in the South Island tourism market and operates cruises in Milford and Doubtful Sounds, the vintage steamship TSS Earnslaw on Lake Wakatipu, the Te Anau-au glowworm caves, Stewart Island ferry services, the Cardrona Alpine Resort, and the International Antarctic Centre in Christchurch.

Hutchins was one of the early members of the Save Manapouri campaign, an environmental campaign waged between 1969 and 1972 to prevent the raising of the levels of lakes Manapouri and Te Anau as part of the construction of the Manapouri Power Station. The issue was significant in the 1972 general election, helped the Labour Party win and form the Third Labour Government of New Zealand, and Norman Kirk established the Guardians of Lake Manapouri. Hutchins was one of the six original Guardians and held that role for many years. In 1970, Hutchins visited Lake Monowai, which had been raised in 1925, and was "appalled at the total destruction of the shoreline of this once beautiful Fiordland lake."

Hutchins was one of the promoters of the Southern Scenic Route, which was officially opened on 6 November 1988.

Hutchins died at his home in Queenstown on 19 December 2003.

== Honours and awards ==
In the 1988 Queen's Birthday Honours, Hutchins was appointed an Officer of the Order of the British Empire (OBE), for services to tourism. In 1990, he received the New Zealand 1990 Commemoration Medal. In the 2002 Queen's Birthday Honours, he was appointed a Distinguished Companion of the New Zealand Order of Merit (DCNZM), for services to conservation and tourism. Hutchins was posthumously inducted into the New Zealand Business Hall of Fame in 2011.

When titular honours were reintroduced in 2009, Hutchins' widow chose to take the courtesy title offered to spouses of knights and has since been known as Olive, Lady Hutchins. She celebrated her 100th birthday in June 2025.

== Autobiography ==
- Hutchins, Les (1998). Making Waves. Fiordland: Craig Printing Company. ISBN 9780473054762.
