= Bruce (kea) =

Male kea at Willowbank Wildlife Reserve

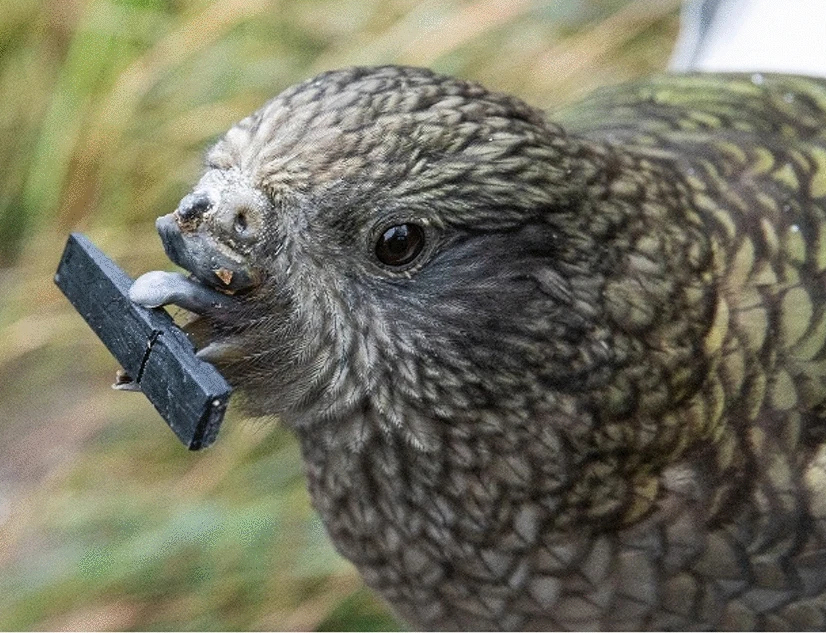
- Bruce holding an object between his tongue and lower mandible
- Species: Nestor notabilis
- Sex: Male
- Born: 2012 or 2013
- Known for: Tool use, use of disability for social dominance
- Residence: Willowbank Wildlife Reserve, Christchurch, New Zealand

Bruce is a male kea (Nestor notabilis; born 2012 or 2013) who lives at Willowbank Wildlife Reserve in Christchurch, New Zealand. Bruce, who underwent a beak injury at a young age, has been studied both for his tool use, apparently to accommodate his injury, and his use of his broken beak to obtain a higher social status.

== Life ==
Bruce was born in the wild in 2012 or 2013. As the result of an injury he received as a fledgling, Bruce lacks the upper mandible or maxilla of his beak. He was found in 2013 at Arthur's Pass and was placed in captivity at Willowbank Wildlife Reserve.

His beak injury has inhibited his ability to perform tasks like eating and preening. Although he primarily eats soft foods, he has also learned to eat hard foods by pushing them against rocks or pieces of metal and then scraping the food with his lower bill. According to keepers, this strategy has not been observed in the other kea.

At Willowbank, Bruce is the most dominant kea. He is "aloof" and occasionally breaks up fights between the other male kea. According to research published in 2026, Bruce displays the lowest stress hormones within the kea collective.

== Scientific study ==
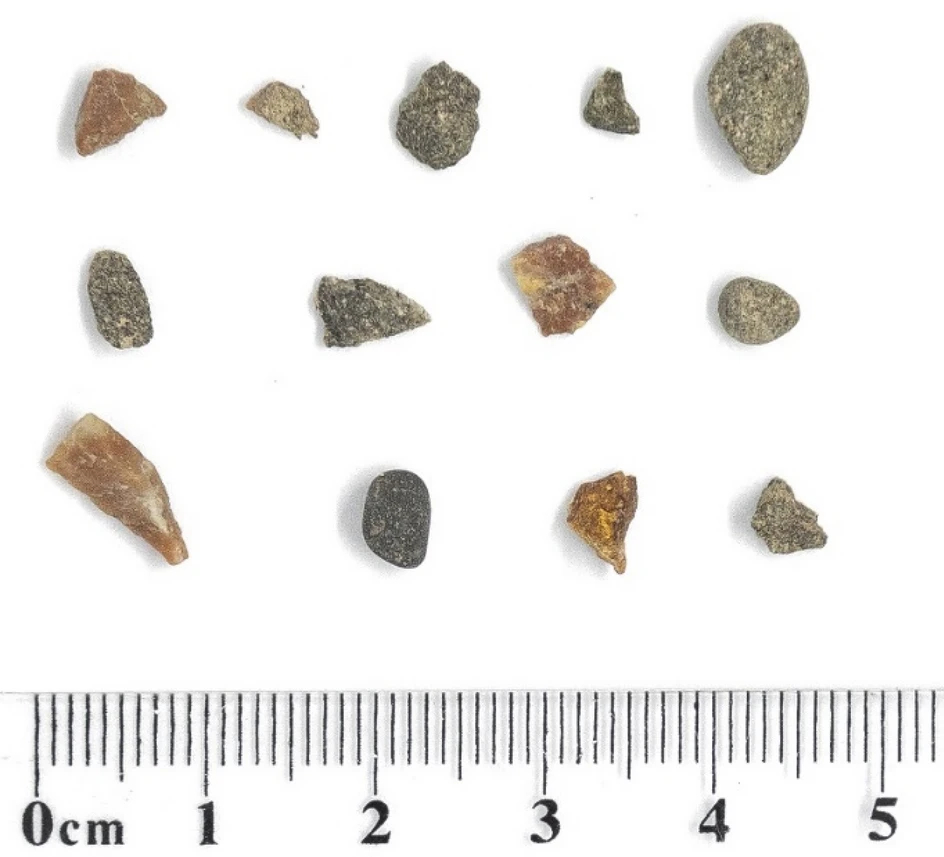
Pebbles used by Bruce for preening

A 2021 study examined Bruce's use of a pebble to assist in preening, a behaviour first observed in 2019. Bruce would choose pebbles, wedge them between his lower mandible and tongue, and then preen himself. Researchers concluded that this qualified as innovative tool use, based on five lines of evidence:

- "In over 90% of instances where Bruce picked up a pebble, he then used it to preen
- In 95% of instances where Bruce dropped a pebble, he retrieved this pebble, or replaced it, in order to resume preening
- Bruce selected pebbles of a specific size for preening rather than randomly sampling available pebbles in his environment
- No other kea in his environment used pebbles for preening
- When other individuals did interact with stones, they used stones of different sizes to those Bruce preened with."

Video of Bruce using his mandible to dominate his social group

At the time of publication, tool use was not considered a species-specific behaviour in keas. Bruce's behaviour also served as an example of self-care tool use in parrots, which researchers stated was "not rigorously reported in [wider] literature".

A 2026 study found that Bruce used his injured beak to obtain alpha status within his social group, by using his sharp lower mandible to joust and stab competitors. Unlike the other kea observed, who primarily used biting attacks, Bruce's stabbing/jousting attacks could be performed more quickly. Both Bruce and the other observed keas used kicking at about the same rates. According to the researchers, the findings "provide the first example of a disabled animal of any species individually achieving and maintaining alpha male status through behavioural innovation alone".
