= Cardrona Alpine Resort =

Ski field in the South Island of New Zealand

Coordinates: 44.873937°S 168.949986°E

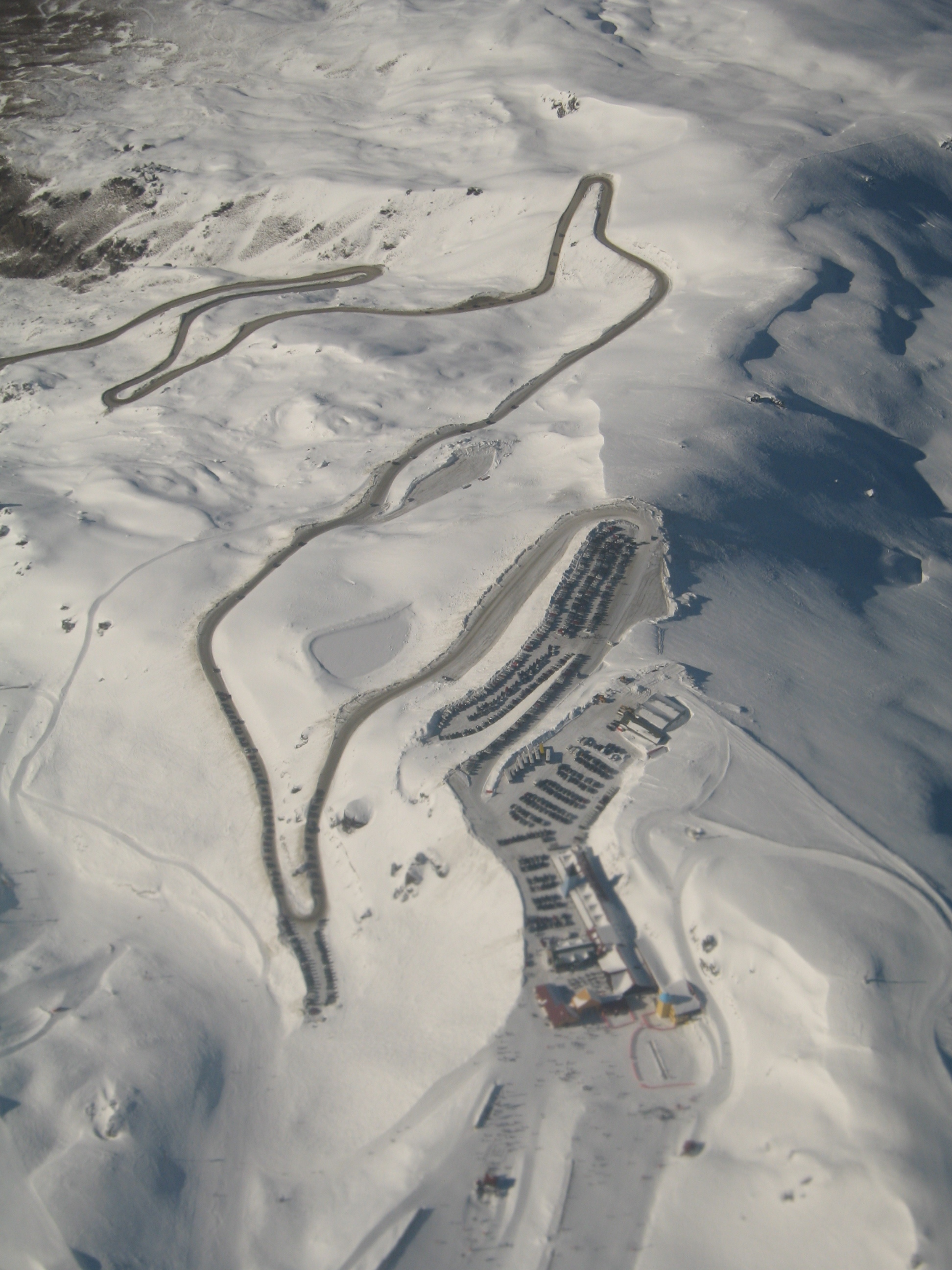
- Interactive map of Cardrona Alpine Resort
- Location: Otago South Island, New Zealand
- Nearest city: Wānaka
- Vertical: 600 m (2,000 ft)
- Top elevation: 1,894 m (6,214 ft)
- Base elevation: 1,670 m (5,480 ft)
- Skiable area: 615 ha (1,520 acres)
- Lift system: 9 total; 6 chairlifts (one detachable six, two fixed quads, two detachable quads, one detachable chondola), 2 magic learner, 1 platter
- Lift capacity: 15200/hour
- Terrain parks: 7 (2 Half Pipes, 4 parks and 1 gravity cross course)
- Snowfall: 2.7 m (8.9 ft)
- Snowmaking: Yes
- Night skiing: No
- Website: cardrona-treblecone.com

Cardrona Alpine Resort is an alpine resort in New Zealand's South Island. The ski field ranges from 1,260m to 1,860m and is the biggest ski resort in New Zealand. Cardrona is operated alongside Treble Cone Ski Field, near the town of Wānaka. The distribution of slopes is 20% beginner, 35% intermediate, 25% advanced and 20% expert. There are 2 detachable quad chairlifts, 2 fixed-grip quad chairlifts, 1 detachable express chondola, 3 surface conveyor learner lifts and 1 platter lift to service the halfpipes and big air jump. Snowmaking supplements the 2.9m average annual snowfall. Freestyle Snowboarding and skiing are well catered for with 2 half-pipes and 4 terrain parks. There is also a "high performance centre" which trains more advanced skiers and snowboarders. Families with infants and young children can use child care facilities provided in the Cardrona Nursery and Ski Kindy.

The resort is located near Wānaka, 5.5 hours drive from Christchurch, 3 hours drive from Dunedin and 50 minutes drive from Queenstown. On-mountain accommodation is provided in the form of 15 self-contained apartments.

There was a tradition, that at the bottom of the mountain, women leave their old bra on the Cardrona Bra Fence before leaving town.

Cardrona Alpine Resort was founded by Cardrona Valley locals John and Mary Lee. It opened for its first winter in 1980. There was so much snow in the first winter that the mountain was only able to open for 3 weeks, around many days of clearing the resort road with a bulldozer. John Lee was not a skier, so built Cardrona's base area in the middle of the resort at 1670m – something very rare for a ski field.

The resort was bought by the Vealls of Melbourne in 1989. This was also the year Cardrona built New Zealand's first international halfpipe.

The old Captain's chairlift (replaced by the Captain's Express) was reinstalled, as the Valley View Quad, below the existing Whitestar Express before the 2010 winter. The main purpose of this lift was to allow construction of a competition grade downhill run, by increasing the lifted vertical available to the resort. General trails are available though. Due to insufficient snow cover this lift did not open for the 2010 season. Stage 2 of the plan was set for the 2011 winter and added snowmaking. The lift has opened every winter from 2011 onwards.

In 2013, New Zealand company Real Journeys purchased Cardrona Alpine Resort. Along with Real Journeys, Cardrona became part of the privately owned Wayfare Group, subsequently rebranded as RealNZ.

In December 2019, the Commerce Commission gave approval for Cardrona to purchase Treble Cone Investments Ltd. In early 2020, Cardrona reported that they were working towards merging the operations and marketing of the two resorts.

In summer 2025, the rebranded RealNZ invested in new infrastructure for the 2025 winter season, adding a new Doppelmayer 6 person chair, a T-bar paralleling the existing Whitestar Chair and a new cafe and retail facility. The new Soho Basin chair is said to add 150 ha (370 acres) of skiable terrain, making Cardrona Alpine Resort the largest commercial ski field in New Zealand.

== Lifts ==
In 2016, the McDougall's Quad Chairlift was removed and replaced with a new high speed "Chondala" lift with both 8 person gondolas and 6 person chairs, improving summer operations at the resort. In 2019 they announced that the old McDougall's quad would be installed below the captain's basin of the ski field. However, this was cancelled, as native lizards were found in the area and would have been disturbed by the development. As of 2021 the lift was relocated to the Soho Ski Area and named Willow's Quad, after the cult classic film Willow, that was filmed in the area in the 1980's. The lift opened up 65 hectares of new, skiable terrain and was opened for the 2021 winter season.

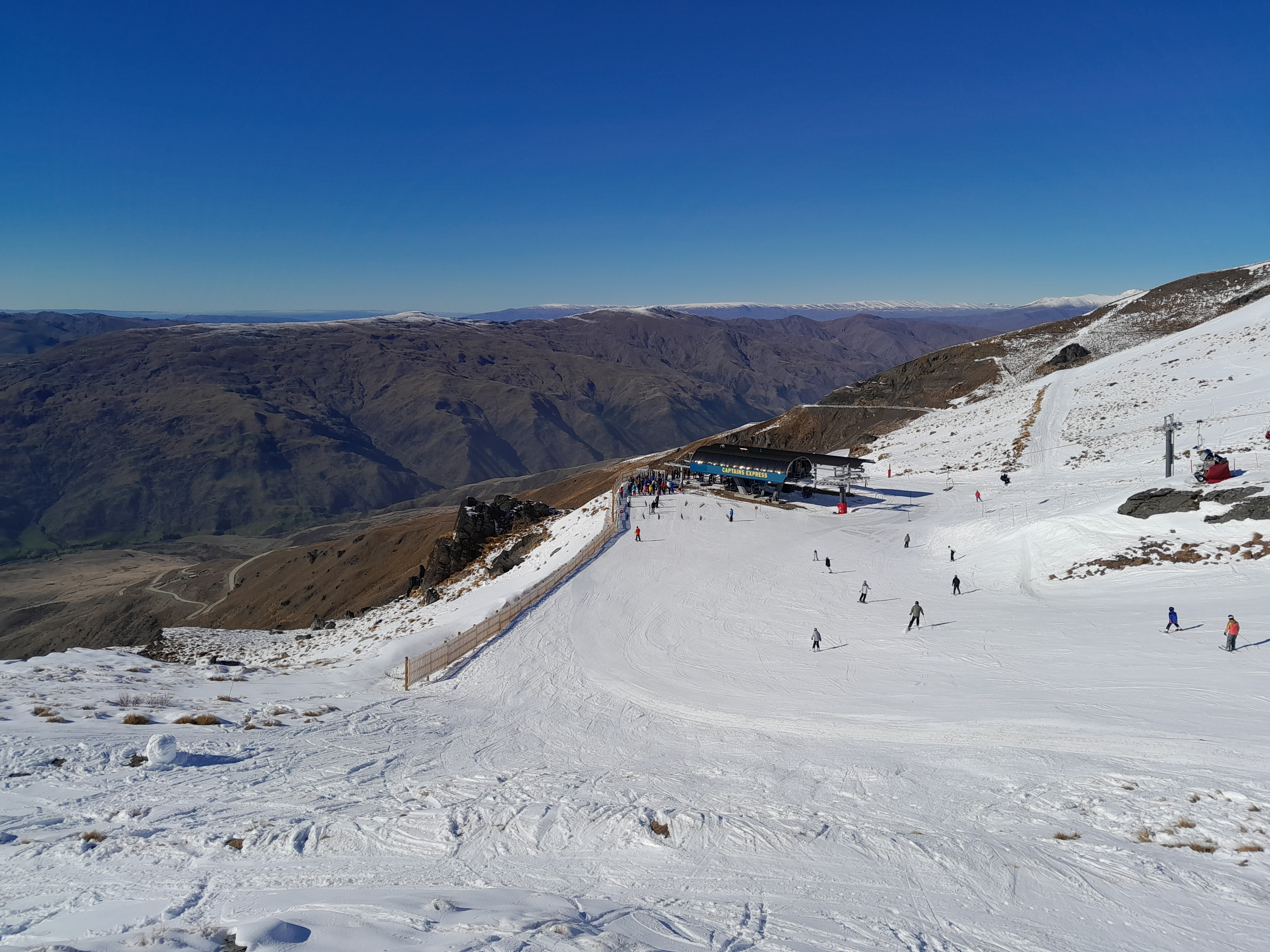
View of Captain's basin, Cardrona Ski Field (2023)

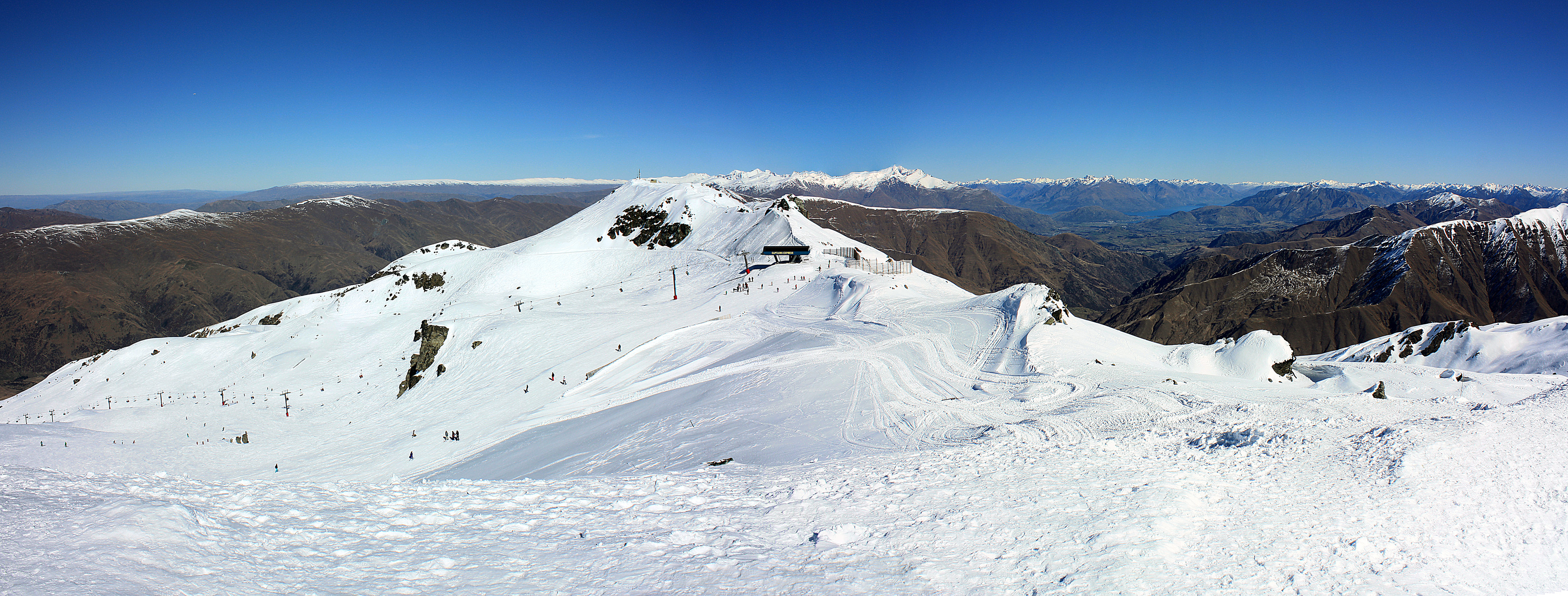
Captain's basin

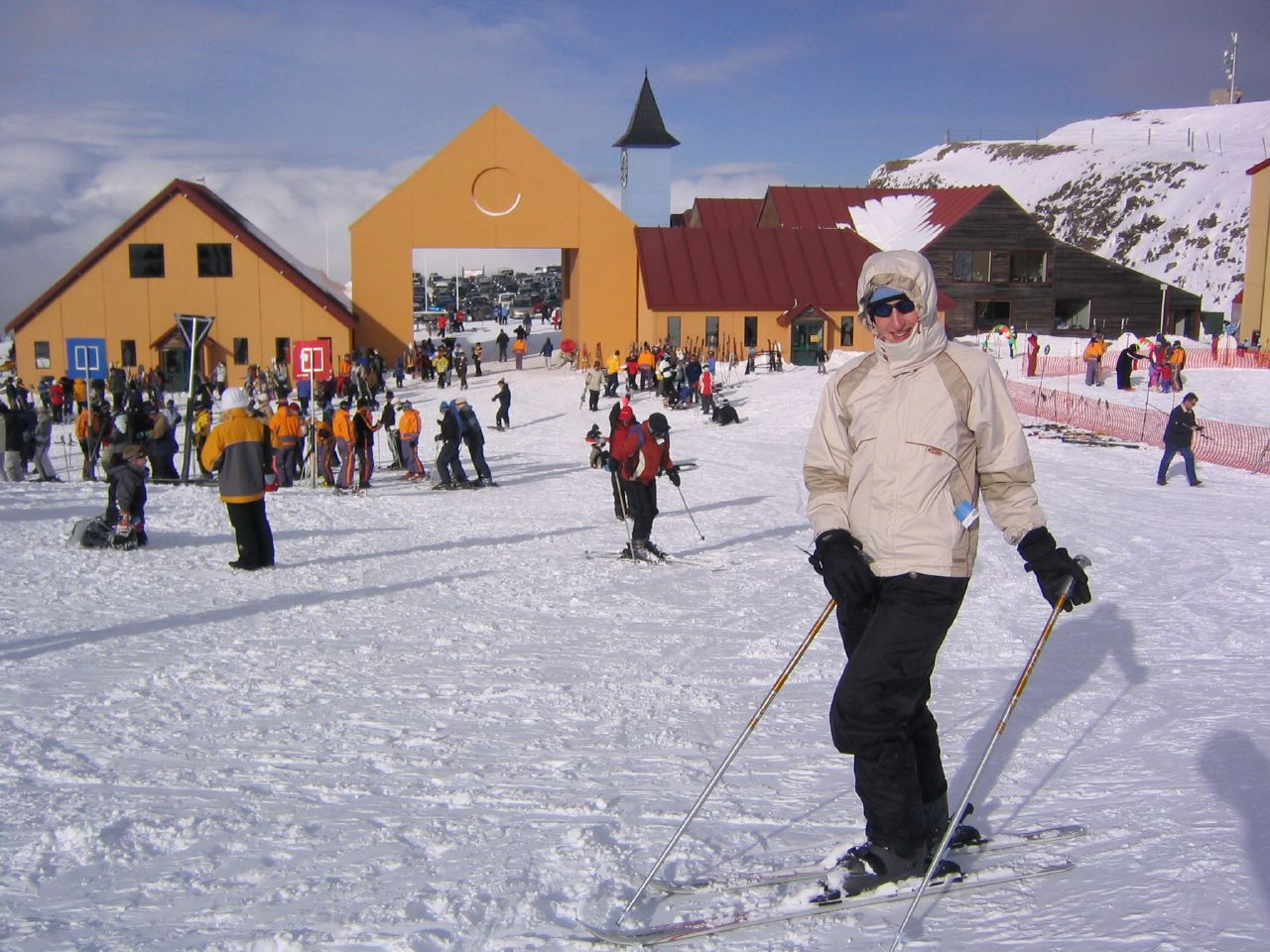
Base buildings, Cardrona Ski Field

Lift Name	Type	Ride Time	Capacity and Speed	Starting Elevation (m)	Vertical Rise (m)
McDougall's Express Chondala	Combined Chairlift and gondala	3 min	2550 people per hour, 5 m/s	1642	178
Whitestar Express Quad	Detachable quad chairlift	5 min	2400 people per hour, 5 m/s	1480	330
Captain's Express Quad	Detachable quad chairlift	4 min	2400 people per hour, 5 m/s	1598	262
Valley View Quad	Fixed grip quad chairlift	8 min	2000 people per hour, 2.1 m/s	1260	280
Willow's Quad	Fixed grip quad chairlift	8 min	2000 people per hour, 2.1 m/s	1424	283
Soho Express	Detachable grip six person chairlift	4 min	3000 people per hour, 5 m/s	1,489	379
