= Te Ana-au Caves =

Caves in New Zealand

Coordinates: 45.2954°S 167.727°E

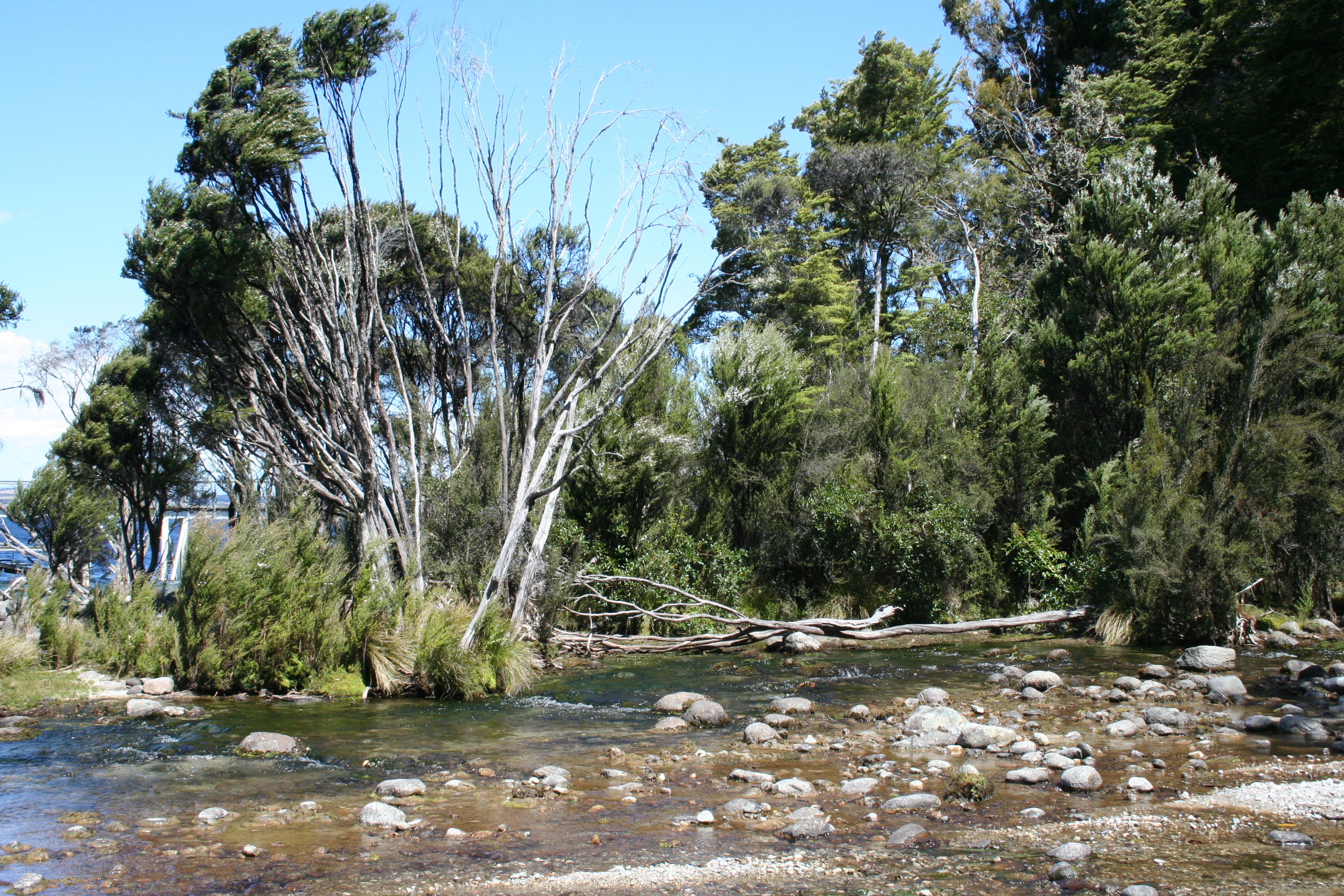
Stream near Te Ana-au cave mouth

The Te Ana-au caves are a culturally and ecologically important system of limestone caves on the western shore of Lake Te Anau, in the southwest of New Zealand. They were re-discovered in 1948 by Lawson Burrows, who found the upper entry after three years of searching, following clues in old Māori legends. It later became a major tourist attraction for the area, as the part of the caverns close to the lake shore is home to glowworms. The unofficial name used by the national caving association is Aurora. The caves are geologically young (estimated 12,000 years) and hence there is only one tiny stalactite.

The Māori name Te Ana-au can be translated as "The Swirling Cave" (te: the; ana: cave; au: swirling) in reference to the water running through it. The water, Tunnel Burn, is the outflow of Lake Orbell.

Lawson Burrows and his business partner Wilson Campbell set up Fiordland Travels as a tourism company for their venture. In 1965, they sold their company to Olive and Les Hutchins, who had been in the tourism business in Fiordland since 1954. The Hutchins took over the company name but rebranded in 2002 to Real Journeys. The company rebranded again to RealNZ in 2022.

Since the caves lie in the Murchison Mountains (where the endangered South Island takahē were rediscovered), and are themselves very fragile, access is restricted. Commercial guided tours by punt through the water-filled caverns run daily, operated by RealNZ.

== See also ==
- List of caves in New Zealand
