= International Antarctic Centre =

Antarctic Centre and tourist attraction in Christchurch

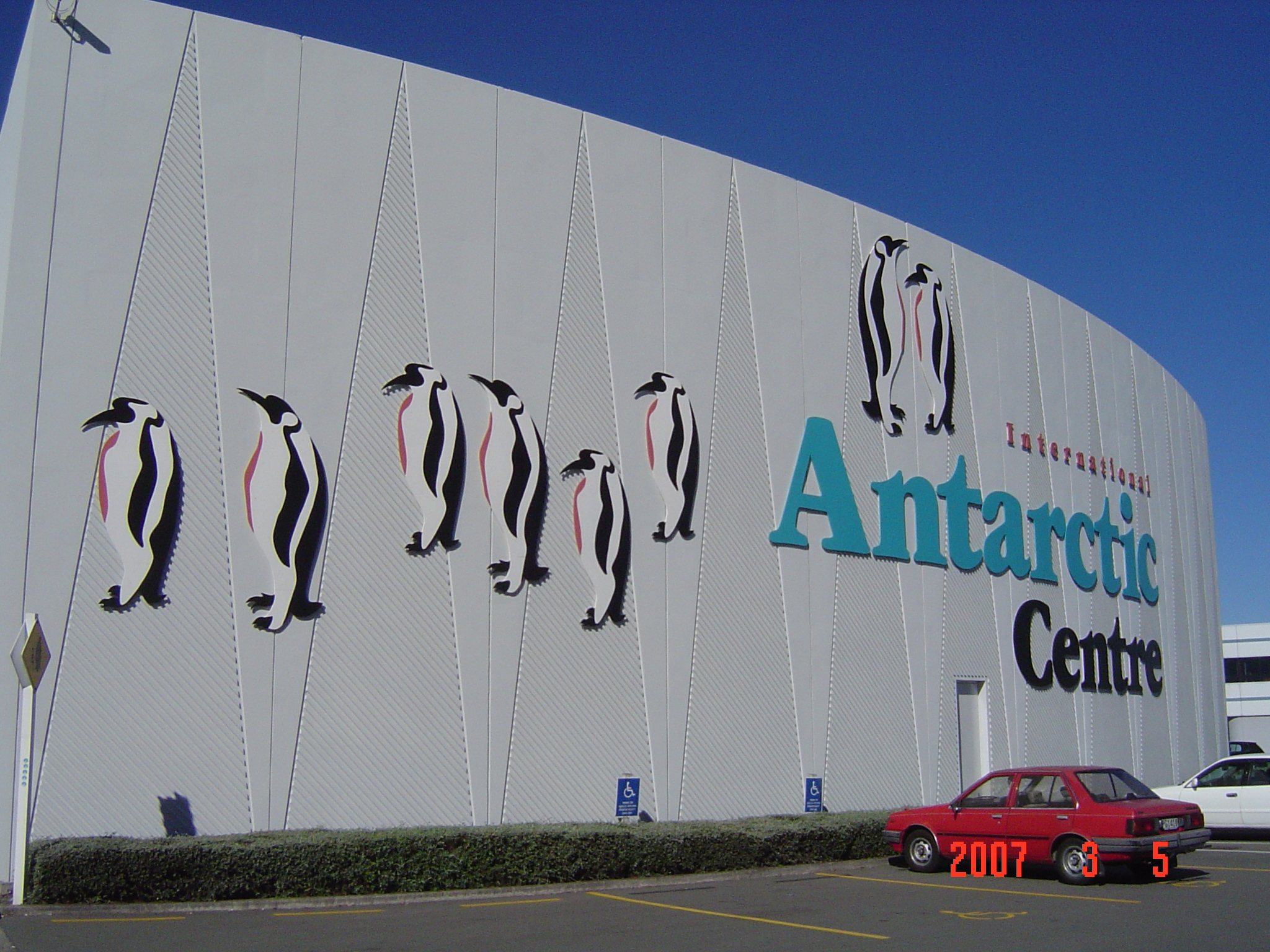

General information
- Type: Exhibition facility
- Location: 38 Orchard Road, Christchurch, New Zealand
- Coordinates: 43°29′19″S 172°32′49″E
- Opened: 28 September 1990
- Owner: Willowbank Wildlife Reserve

Design and construction
- Architect: Warren & Mahoney

Website
- www.iceberg.co.nz

The International Antarctic Centre is a visitor attraction and public science discovery centre in the suburb of Harewood, Christchurch, New Zealand. It is located at Christchurch International Airport, adjacent to the buildings that are the Christchurch base for the Antarctic programmes of the US, New Zealand and Italy.

== Description ==
The Centre is located in a campus containing the Christchurch bases for the New Zealand, US and Italian Antarctic Programmes, and comprises administration offices, warehousing, an American/New Zealand clothing store, a post office and travel agency, and the Antarctic Passenger Terminal.

The International Antarctic Centre consists of Antarctic exhibits, a café, and bar. The visitor attractions include an Antarctic snow storm room, an audiovisual display, meetups with husky dogs, and rides in Hägglunds all-terrain vehicle outside the centre. There is also a little blue penguins exhibit. The centre is set up for taking in penguins from the wild that are in need of help.

== History ==
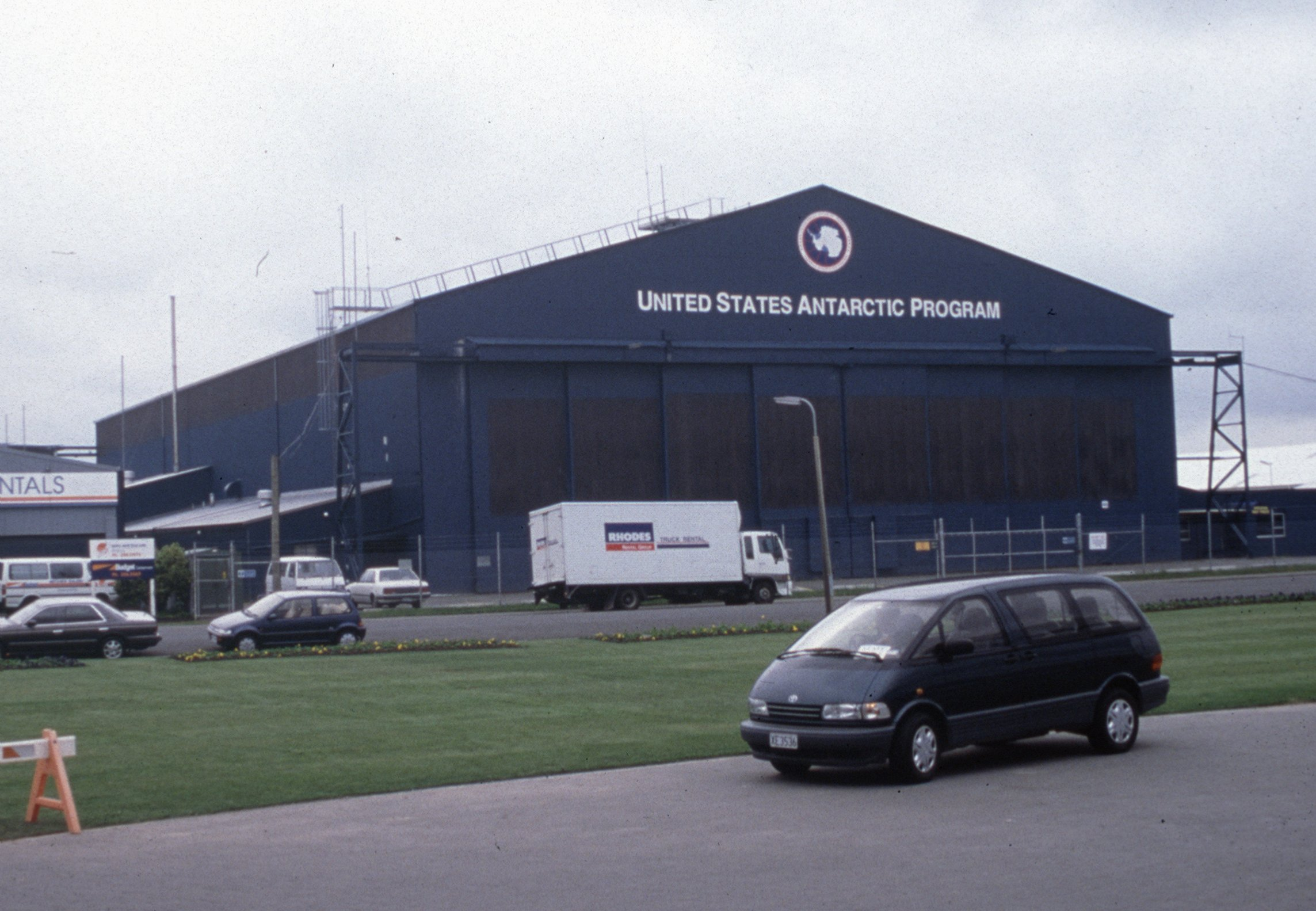
The centre has its roots in the U.S. Antarctic Program

=== Background ===
Christchurch has a long history of association with travel to Antarctica. The first British Antarctic expedition by Robert Falcon Scott visited Christchurch in November–December 1901 with the vessel RRS Discovery, on the voyage to Antarctica. Ernest Shackelton also visited Christchurch from November 1907 to January 1908 with his expedition vessel Nimrod. Robert Falcon Scott visited Christchurch again in October–November 1910 in the ship Terra Nova on his ill-fated expedition.

In the early 1950s, planning began for a period of geophysical research known as the International Geophysical Year. The years 1957-58 were selected, and the focus included the Antarctic continent. On 1 February 1955, the US Navy established the US Naval Support Force, Antarctica, as part of its Atlantic fleet. This was the beginnings of what became known as Operation Deep Freeze, and led to the establishment of research stations in Antarctica in preparation for the International Geophysical Year. A fleet of specially prepared aircraft were selected by the US Navy to provide air support for the programme. The aircraft were based at Wigram and Harewood airports in Christchurch. The first landing on the ice was on 31 October 1956. The logistical support for the US Antarctic programme, including its base at Christchurch airport, continued to be led by the US Navy until 1998, when the US Department of Defense and the National Science Foundation agreed to transfer logistical support to the US Department of the Air Force.

Christchurch Airport remains a base for direct flights to Antarctica, and the city is one of only five in the world with such links.

=== Construction ===
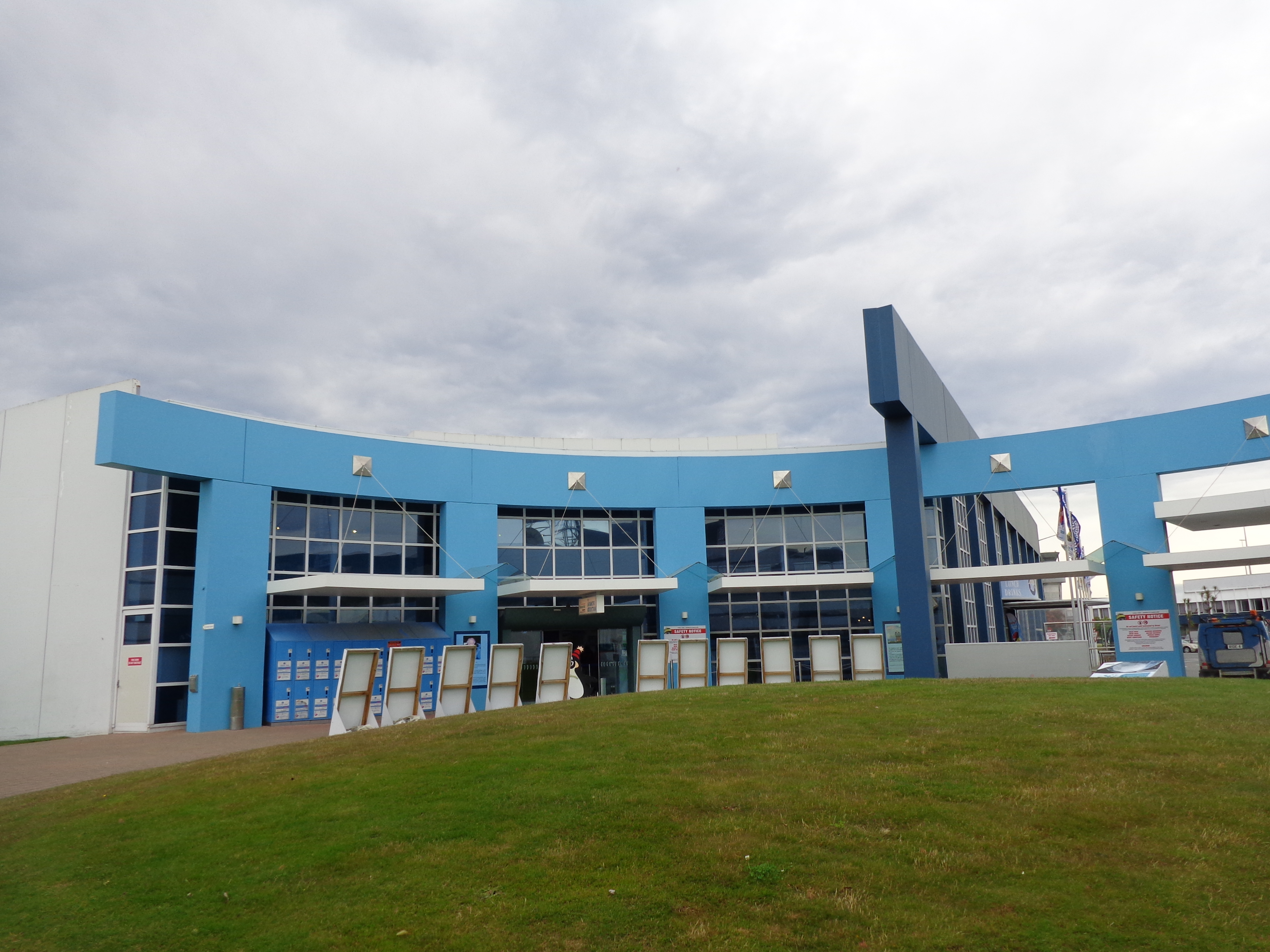
International Antarctic Centre

The International Antarctic Centre was built by the Christchurch Airport company, after agreements were reached between the airport, the New Zealand DSIR Antarctic Division and the United States National Science Foundation. In 1990, after the plans for the centre were approved, the New Zealand Government provided a grant for international promotional work to raise the profile of Christchurch as an Antarctic gateway city, with the International Antarctic Centre as a focus. The centre was developed in two stages. The first stage opened in September 1990, providing an office and warehouse storage facility for the Antarctic programmes of New Zealand, the United States and Italy. The second stage of the development was the Antarctic visitor centre, built as a tourism venture in 1992. The architect for the development was Barry Dacombe of Warren & Mahoney, and the main contractor was Armitage Williams Construction. Dacombe describes the visitor centre building as: "a series of fan shaped solids of varying height appearing as large wedges of ice squeezed outwards from the Antarctic continent".

=== Visitor attractions ===
The visitors centre draws on the 100 year history of Christchurch as a gateway for operations in Antarctica. In 1998, the centre reported that since the opening in 1992, more than one million people had been through the attraction. Nearly half were from Canterbury.

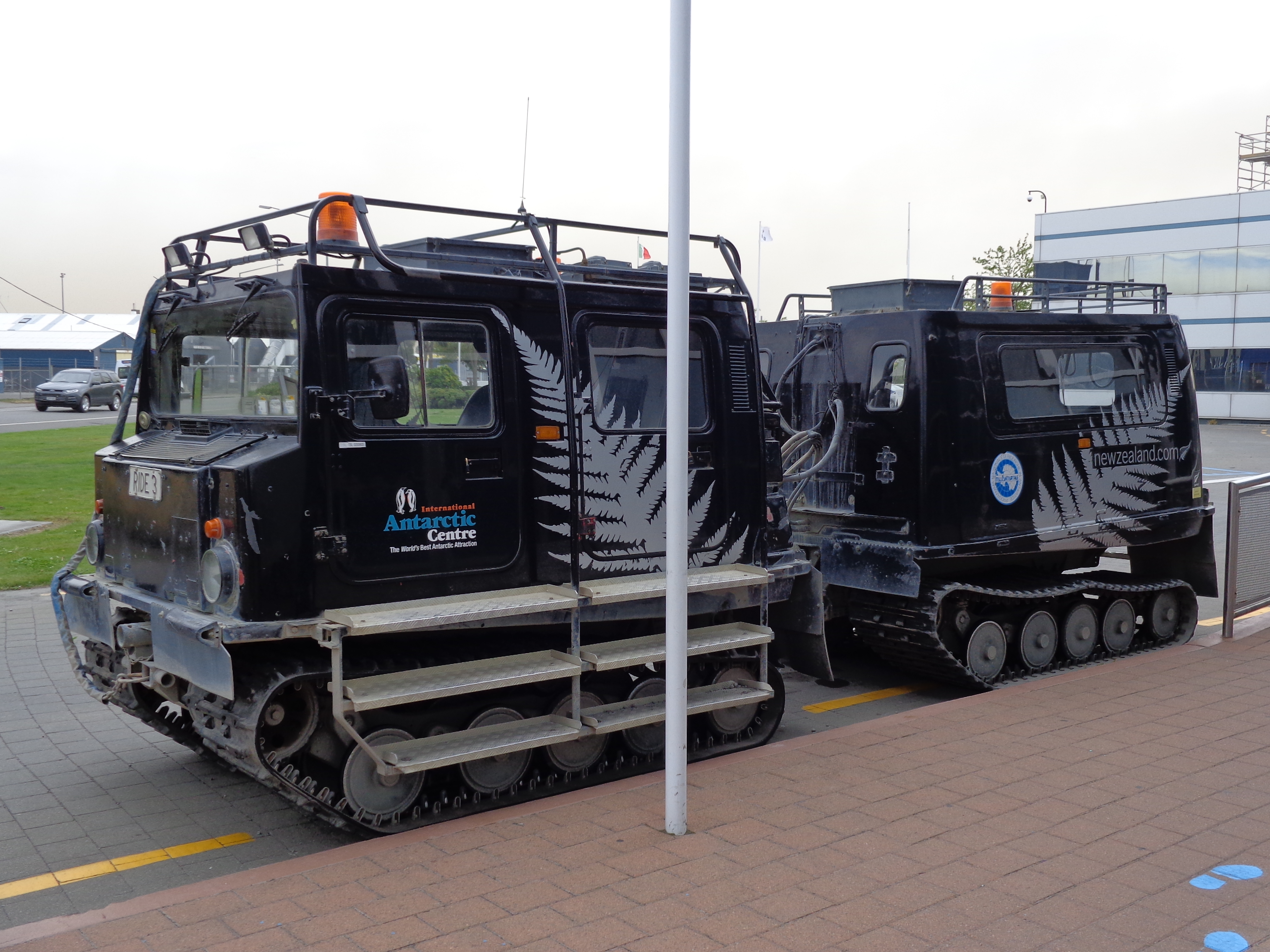
Hägglunds all-terrain vehicle

One of the attractions at the centre is the Swedish-made Hägglunds dual-cab all-terrain vehicles used for transport on the ice. The vehicles at the International Antarctic Centre are similar to those used in Antarctic operations, but have been adapted for the visitor experience at the centre. The first Hägglunds arrived in 1999, and in the next 12 months, more than 27,000 people took a ride around the visitor centre in the vehicle.

In 2001, a second Hägglunds all-terrain vehicle was added to the attraction, along with a mock 1.2 metres (3 ft 11 in) crevasse on the vehicle route. The centre reported that 40,000 people per year were taking a ride in the Hägglunds.

The 10th anniversary of the opening of the International Antarctic Centre was celebrated in September 2002 with a group of 625 children making an attempt on the world record for the world's biggest birthday card. In September 2003, the centre opened a new attraction: the Antarctic Storm. This provides visitors with a 3-minute exposure to a simulated Antarctic blizzard, with wind chill temperatures down to −25 °C (−13 °F).

In 2004, annual visitor numbers reached 200,000 with 80% of those coming from other countries. In the same year, it was reported that 45,000 people each year were taking part in the Antarctic education programme run from the centre.

A penguin encounter opened at the centre in 2006, and by January 2008, the annual visitor numbers had grown to 246,000. Work had also commenced on producing a short film about Antarctica, to be shown in the centre on the largest high-definition screen in the South Island. In October 2008, the first Little blue penguin chick was born at the centre.

The Christchurch earthquake of 22 February 2011 caused major disruption to the tourism sector in the city. Visits to Christchurch dropped by 1 million visitor-nights in the year to February 2022. Prior to the earthquake, over 80% of visitors to the International Antarctic Centre were from other countries, but the numbers dropped significantly after the earthquake. The centre changed its marketing focus to attract more local visitors, and introduced annual passes and heavily discounted tickets for families. These initiatives were successful, and during the winter school holiday period in 2012, up to half of all visitors to the centre were from the local Canterbury region.

=== Changes of ownership ===
From the time of its original establishment, the International Antarctic Centre was owned by the Christchurch Airport company, which in turn was 75 per cent owned by the council's Christchurch City Holdings Ltd and 25 per cent owned by the Government. However, in 2000, Richard Benton, who had been manager of the International Antarctic Centre for four years, led a management buy-out of the operation. The land and buildings remained the property of the airport.

In November 2011, Christchurch International Airport announced that it had purchased the International Antarctic Centre from Richard Benton, who had owned the business for the preceding 11 years.

In October 2015, the International Antarctic Centre was bought by tourism company Real Journeys. Along with Real Journeys, the International Antarctic Centre became part of the privately owned Wayfare Group, subsequently re-branded as RealNZ.

In July 2023, RealNZ announced that they intended to sell the International Antarctic Centre. In October 2024 it was announced that the facility had been sold to the owners of the Willowbank Wildlife Reserve for an undisclosed sum.

== Awards ==
In 1997, the International Antarctic Centre won the visitor attraction category in the New Zealand Tourism Awards. It was also a finalist in 1998.

On 24 September 2009, at the Canterbury Champion Awards Dinner, it was announced that the International Antarctic Centre had been judged the overall winner in the Champion Host – medium, large enterprise category. The International Antarctic Centre was recognised as the Champion Host Winner and shared the finalist category along with Whale Watch Kaikōura and Canterbury Museum.

In the 2024 New Zealand Tourism awards, the General Manager of the International Antarctic Centre, David Kennedy, won the Tourism Champion award.
