= Willowbank Wildlife Reserve =

- Interactive map of Willowbank Wildlife Reserve
- 43°27′46″S 172°35′39″E
- Location: Christchurch, New Zealand
- Annual visitors: 120,000+
- Website: www.willowbank.co.nz

Willowbank Wildlife Reserve is a wildlife park and nature reserve in Christchurch, New Zealand.

As well as having public displays of various animal species it also carries out conservation of native species including tuatara, kiwi, brown teal, and Duvaucel's gecko. Willowbank also holds the only pair of takahē on display in the South Island of New Zealand outside a Department of Conservation facility.

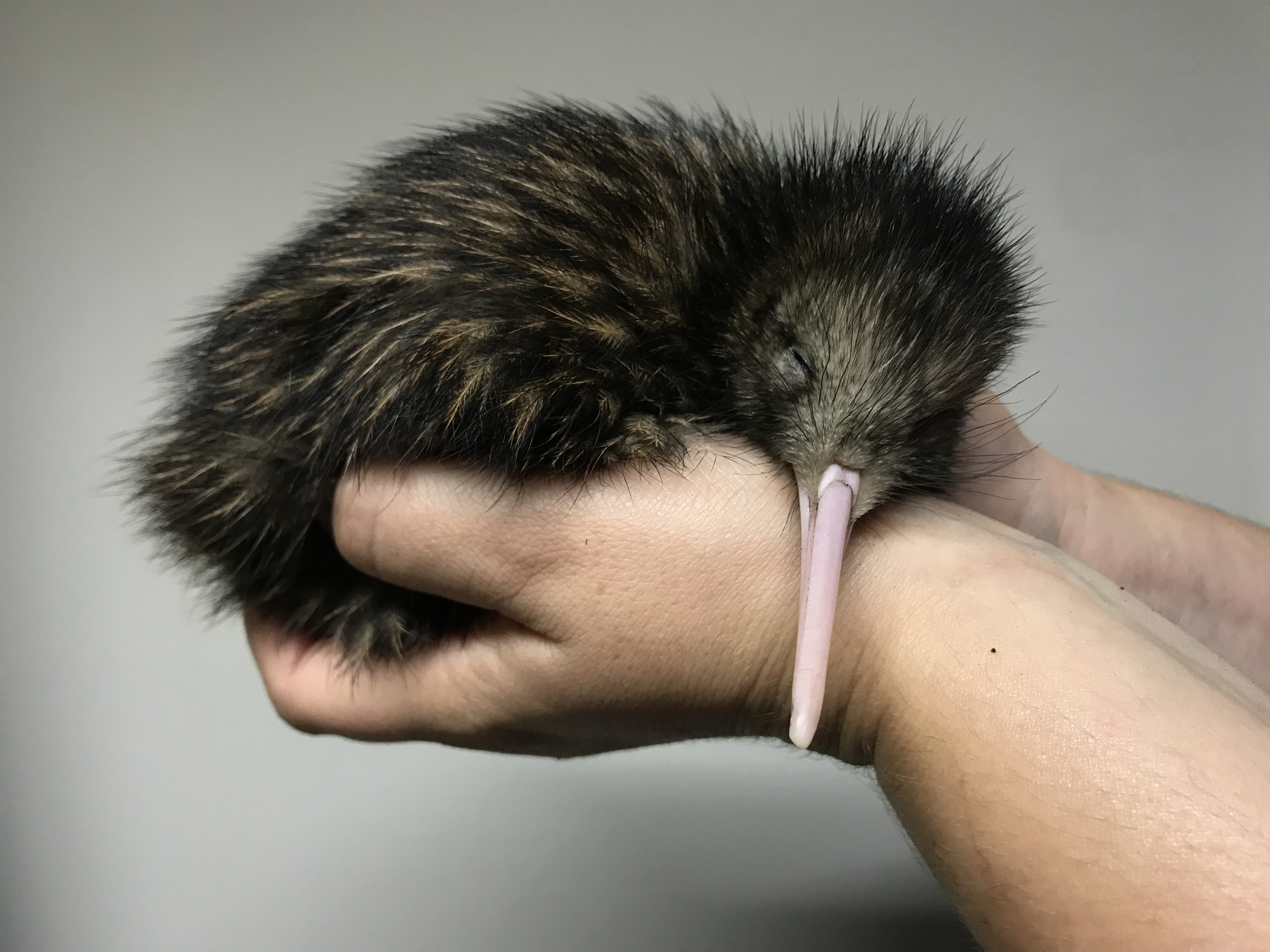
Rata is a North island brown kiwi chick who was incubated, hatched and raised at Willowbank Wildlife Reserve.

== History ==
Willowbank Wildlife Reserve was opened by Michael Willis and his wife in October 1974. Initially the park operated as a typical zoo, with a mix of exotic and farmyard animals on display for visitors. As Willis became more interested in animal conservation, the park began to incorporate more native species and rare farmyard breeds.

A capuchin monkey escaped from the park in 2009.

Willowbank hosts the New Zealand Conservation Trust. The trust breeds and hatches kiwi, raising 200 kiwi chicks between 2007 and 2013. Eggs are collected from the wild and brought to the facility to ensure that they hatch successfully. In addition to a normal outdoor habitat, Willowbank features a nocturnal viewing house for kiwi, allowing guests to see them during the day. The kiwi house was built from two kitset barns, and was opened in 1996 by Princess Anne. She also serves as the patron of the trust.

A waterway in the middle of the park is home to large New Zealand longfin eels, which visitors can touch and feed. In 2012, two men broke into the facility and photographed themselves after killing several of the eels with spears.

The kea at the facility have been the subject of scientific study. One study looked at their intelligence, with one co-author of the paper describing their ability to draw statistical inferences as "unprecedented" in birds. Another study was conducted on one resident kea, Bruce, who is missing the top-half of his beak. The study investigated his use of small pebbles as tools to aid in preening, as supportive measures to overcome his disability. The study received international media coverage.

During nationwide lockdowns caused by the COVID-19 pandemic, the general manager and her family lived in the zoo to look after the animals.

Willowbank is one of only three places where takahē can be viewed by the public—the others being Pūkaha / Mount Bruce and Zealandia—so is the only such place in the South Island. In 2021, the park received a breeding pair of takahē.

In 2024, Willowbank announced that they had purchased the International Antarctic Centre for an undisclosed sum.

== Species ==
Willowbank houses 95 species that are divided into three sections: exotics, heritage farmyard and New Zealand natives.

The exotics section houses international species including blue and gold macaws, scarlett macaws, capuchin monkeys, capybara, small-clawed otter, ring-tailed lemurs, black-and-white ruffed lemur, star tortoise, leopard tortoise and green iguana.

The heritage farmyard section works alongside the Rare Breeds Conservation Society, holding and breeding species of farm animals that are dying breeds including Arapawa goats, Damara sheep, Enderby Island rabbits and zebu.

The New Zealand natives section houses species from around New Zealand including kea, kākā, North Island brown kiwi, South Island brown kiwi, Okarito kiwi, great spotted kiwi, morepork, New Zealand falcon and tuatara.

== See also ==
- Department of Conservation
