= Cardrona Bra Fence =

Tourist attraction in New Zealand

Cardrona bra fence
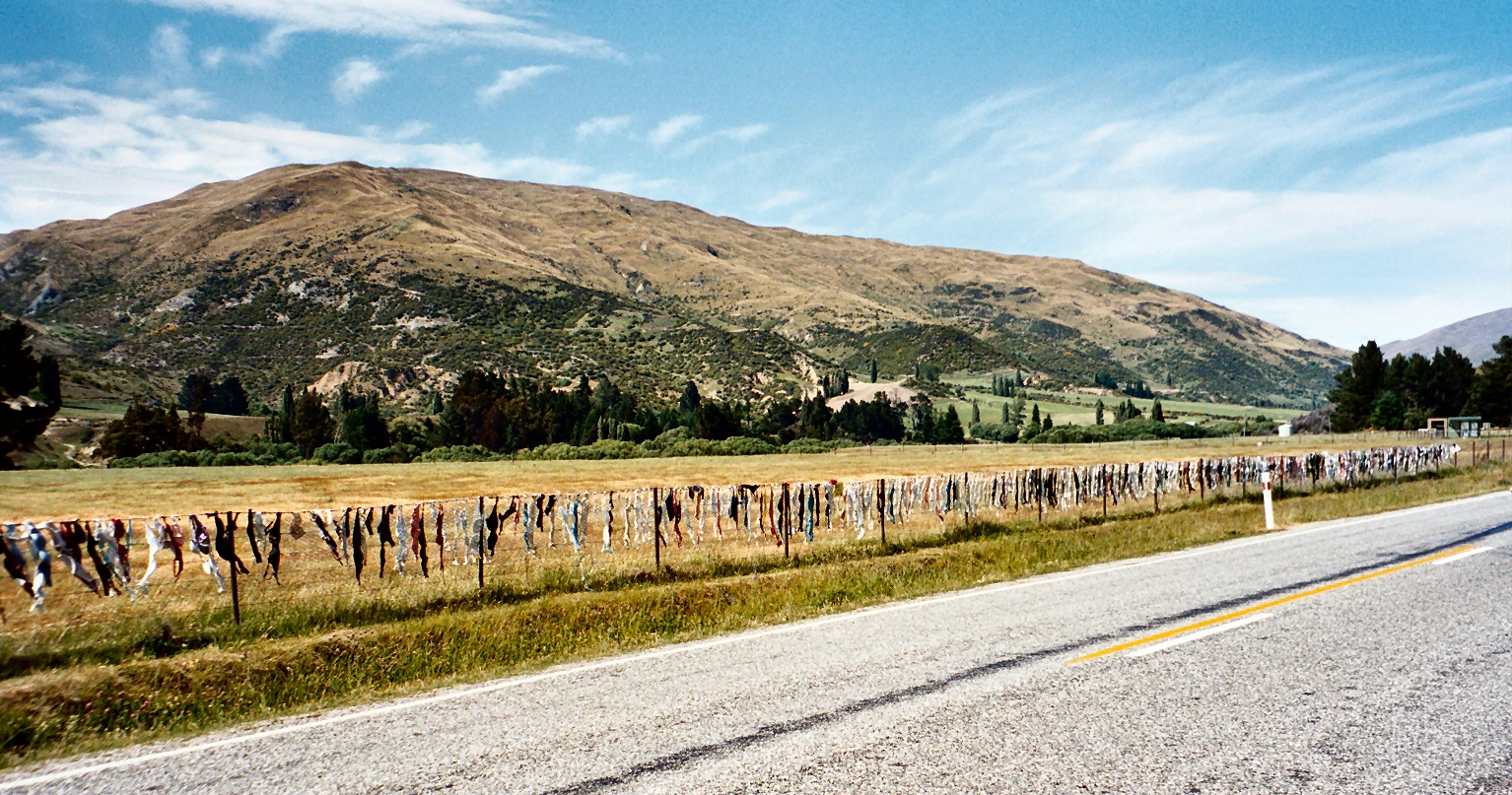
- The bra fence in December 2002
- Interactive map of Cardrona bra fence
- Location: Cardrona Valley, Otago
- Coordinates: 44.860432°S 169.022169°E
- Designer: Grassroots attraction
- Beginning date: between 1998 and 1999

The Cardrona Bra Fence is a tourist attraction in Central Otago, New Zealand. At some point between 1998 and 1999, passers-by began to attach bras to a rural fence. The fence gradually became a well known site as the number of bras grew to hundreds. The fence is located on a public road reserve, adjacent to farm property in the Cardrona Valley area southwest of Wānaka, near to Cardrona.

Despite its popularity, there has been disagreement over the value of the attraction. The bra fence stands next to the Cardrona Distillery.

== Origins ==
The Bra Fence began at some point between Christmas 1998 and New Year 1999, when four bras were attached to the wire fence alongside the road. The original reason for the bras being attached to the fence is unknown. News spread of the addition, which was left on the fence by the local landowners, and more bras began to appear. By the end of February there were some 60 bras, but at about this time they were all removed anonymously. This was reported in the local press, and the story gained widespread dissemination through the New Zealand media, leading to more bras appearing.

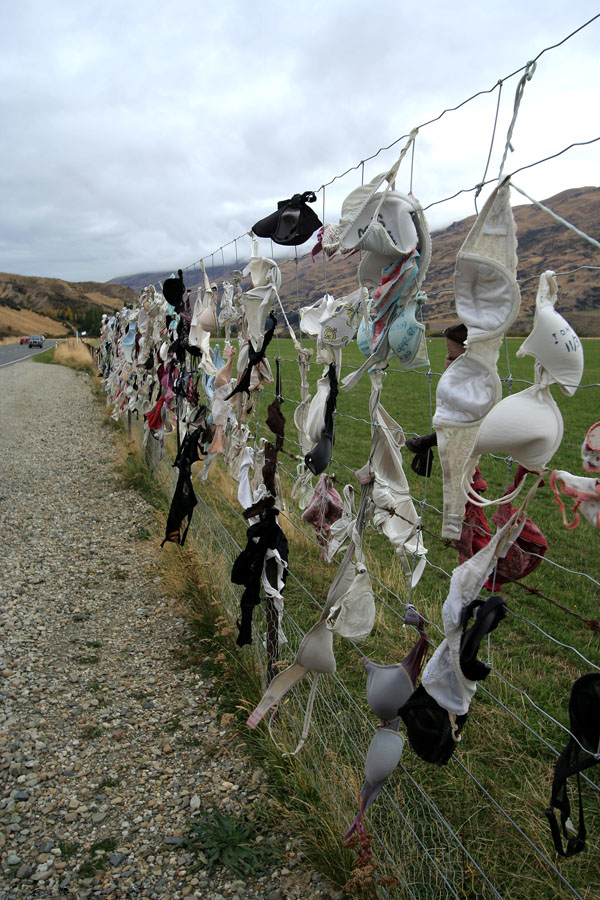
The fence by the end of March 2006.

By October 2000, the number of bras had reached around 200, and again the fence was cleared of bras. This time the story spread even wider, as the fence had become a quirky tourist attraction to some, and media sources from as far afield as Europe became interested in the fence. Due to this interest, the number of bras being added to the fence personally, or sent to be added, increased dramatically. In early 2006, the number of bras attached to the fence stood at close to 800.

== Controversy and removal ==
Although some locals welcomed the fence and regarded it as a tourist attraction, others viewed it as an eyesore and embarrassment, and as a potential hazard to drivers using the road. Frequent legal attempts were consequently made to see it removed. These attempts increased in early 2006, accompanied by a further removal of some 200 of the bras. Some locals claimed that a number of Japanese students who were being educated in nearby Wānaka could get offended by the fence, as well as many other Asians or South Africans.

However, local sheep farmer John Lee, who had become the unofficial guardian of the site, refused to remove the bras from the fence, claiming that 90% of letters received about the fence were positive, and that the bras were the most photographed attraction in the area.

On 28 April 2006, after discovering the fence rested on public road reserve, the local Council determined the bra fence was a "traffic hazard" and an "eyesore", and ordered the bras on the fence to be removed. The fence's removal led to an attempt to make the world's longest bra chain, at an annual festival in nearby Wānaka, later that year. The chain reached some 7,400 bras, over 100,000 short of the world record, but raised over $10,000 for charity.

== New location and charity involvement ==
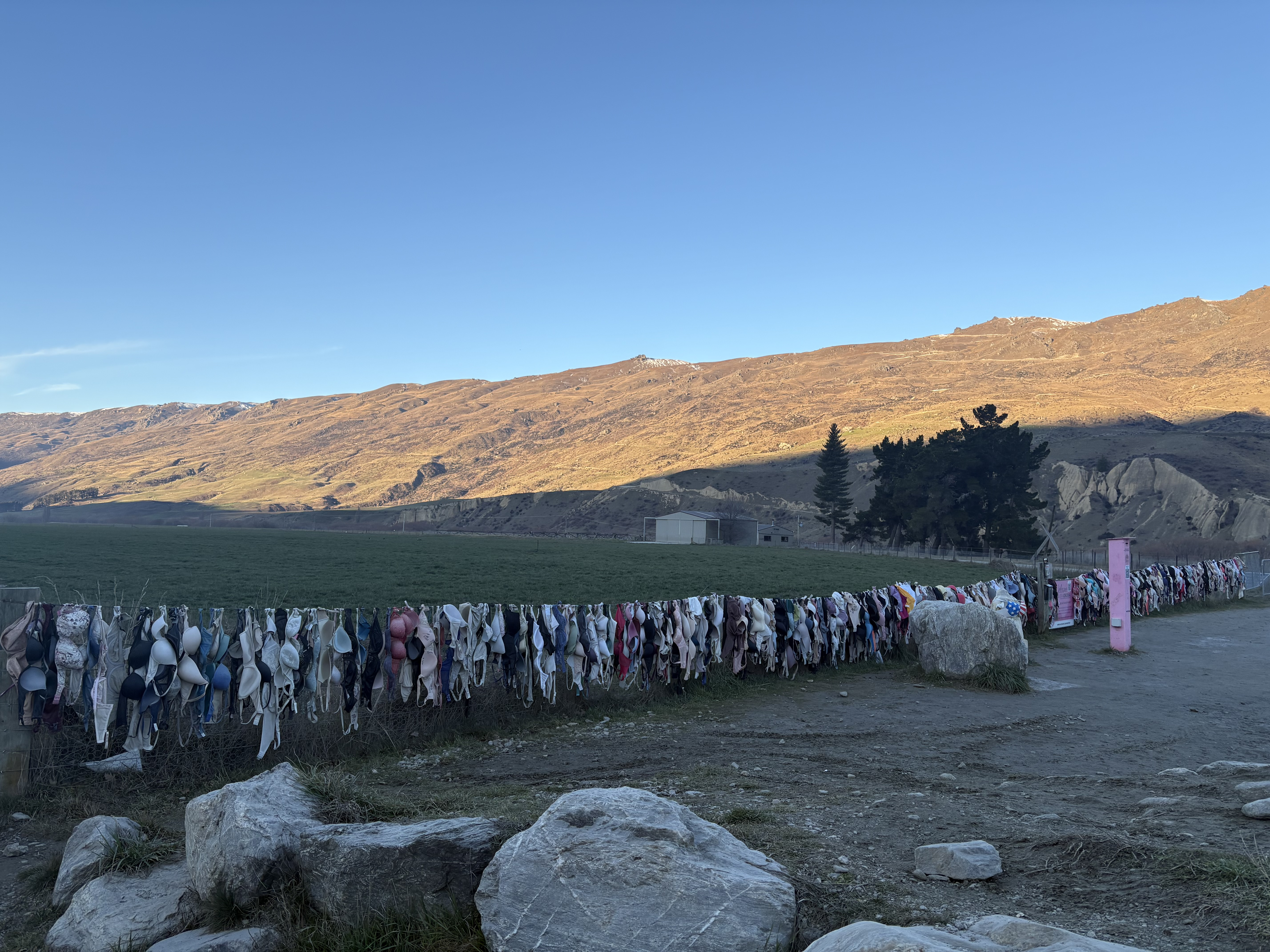
The fence in its new location in July 2025. The pink collection box is visible to the right of the image

In November 2014, Cardrona tour guide Kelly Spaans and her partner Sean Colbourne decided to take voluntary guardianship of the fence after it had been stripped by anonymous people on a number of occasions. They shifted the fence from beside the Cardrona Valley Road to their private driveway about 100 metres away from its original spot. A pink sign and a collection box were put up in March 2015 to help raise funds for the New Zealand Breast Cancer Foundation. The area is playfully called "Bradrona".

In 2017, Bradrona had raised over $30,000 in charity funds. In the same year, Cardrona Distillery, which is located next to the fence, produced a pink gin to acknowledge Breast Cancer Awareness Month, donating $5 per bottle to the NZBCF. The distillery has made the same donation arrangement on a permanent basis for a single malt vodka called 'The Reid' in honour of the fence. By 2018 over $70,000 had been raised and in 2019 it was reported that over $500 were deposited in the collection box every week. In June 2024, donations reached $180,000.
