= Treble Cone =

Ski area in Otago, New Zealand

Coordinates: 44.634°S 168.896°E

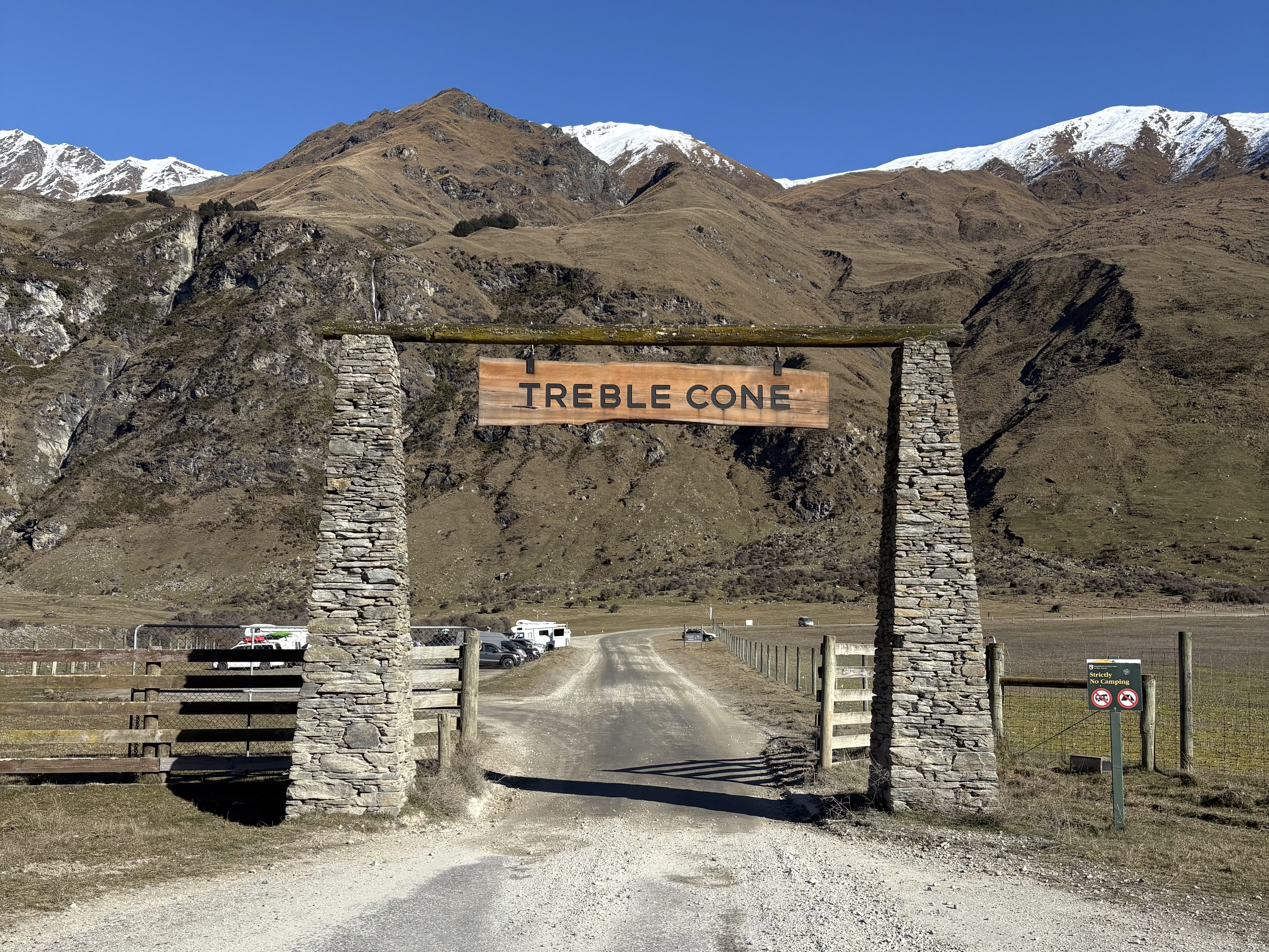
- The entrance to Treble Cone
- Interactive map of Treble Cone
- Location: Otago, New Zealand
- Nearest city: Wānaka
- Top elevation: 2,088 m (6,850 ft)
- Base elevation: 1,260 m (4,130 ft)
- Lift capacity: 6200 skiers
- Terrain parks: 2
- Snowfall: 2.7 m
- Snowmaking: yes
- Night skiing: no
- Website: cardrona-treblecone.com

Treble Cone is the closest ski area to Wānaka, New Zealand.

Treble Cone is a large ski area in the South Island, boasting the longest vertical rise in the Queenstown Southern Lakes District. It is operated alongside Cardrona Alpine Resort. Treble Cone is most known for its views over Lake Wānaka and Mount Aspiring / Tititea and its intermediate, advanced and expert terrain. The ski field has been the off-season training ground for the national ski team of Austria.

== History ==
Founded by Rod Aubrey, Murray Raffills (Raffills Ridge namesake) and Ralph Markby in 1968, Treble Cone started out as a small club field managed by local ski enthusiasts.

In 1975, Treble Cone was listed as a public company to raise funds for a high standard road, modest base building and ski hire facilities, constructed over the summer and opened in 1976. Development continued throughout the '80s and early '90s with the mountain's first double chair installed in the Home Basin in 1983, a T-Bar in the Saddle Basin in 1989 and the first permanent snowmaking facilities in 1991.

Treble Cone received its next major upgrade in 1995/96 with the installation of New Zealand's first high speed, detachable 6-seater chairlift in the Home Basin. The double chair was moved to improve access to the Saddle Basin. There were also major extensions to the base building, a new car parking area was developed, and a snowmaking pond was installed.

Earthworks dominated development in the 2000s (summers of 2004, 2006, 2007, 2008, 2010 and 2011), improving the beginner and intermediate terrain in the Home and Saddle Basin and access to the Saddle Basin.

In 2005, Treble Cone saw a new fixed grip quad chairlift in the Saddle Basin and Ski Patrol hut at the top of the Six Seater. In 2006 and again in 2007, further investment increased snowmaking across the Home Basin.

Along with Cardrona Alpine Resort, Treble Cone updated its sales and ticketing systems in 2011/12, enabling the launch of OnePassNZ, a shared lift pass. The RFID ticketing system allowed guests with pre-paid passes to ski straight to the gate, as well as to track vertical and number of runs skied.

In December 2019, the Commerce Commission approved the purchase of Treble Cone Investments Ltd by Cardrona Alpine Resort. In early 2020, Cardrona reported that they were working towards merging the operations and marketing of the two resorts.

== Winter activities ==
Treble Cone is the largest ski area in New Zealand's South Island, equalled only by Roundhill after the installation of a 1.44 km (0.9 miles) rope tow (world's longest rope tow) in 2010. Treble Cone has a vertical rise of 700m creating the longest runs in Queenstown Southern Lakes District, including the 4 km High Street to Easy Rider beginner to intermediate groomed run.

Treble Cone is most known for its fairly steep and challenging terrain, which it claims is some of the best in the country. Recent earthworks initiatives have however ensure that beginner to intermediate skiers and boarders are fully catered for. These include providing more expansive beginner and intermediate groomed trails for skiers and boarders in both the Home and Saddle Basin, and a free beginner surface lift and ski area near the base facilities. There is also a small terrain park and kids' fun trail to explore.

The backcountry ski and snowboard scene around Queenstown and Wānaka uses Treble Cone as an access point to some of the out-of-bound terrain in the region. The resort sells a discounted lift pass to help backcountry users access this terrain from Treble Cone's summit. Professionally led backcountry ski and splitboard tours also leave from Treble Cone, operated by a number of local guiding companies.

Resort area

- Ski Area Size: 550ha (1,359 acres)
- Lifted Vertical: 700 m (2,321 ft)
- Longest Run: 4 km (2.5miles)
- Summit Elevation: 2088 m (6,850 ft)
- Base Buildings: 1260 m (4,110 ft)
- Top of 6 Seater Express: 1760 m (5,774 ft)
- Top of Saddle Quad Chairlift: 1960 m (6,430 ft)
- Beginner Terrain: 10%
- Intermediate Terrain: 45%
- Advanced Terrain: 45%
- Terrain Parks: Intermediate Park & Kids Fun Trail

Lifts

- High Speed Detachable Six Seater Chairlift
- Quad Chairlift
- Platter Lift

Resort facilities

- Snowsports School (kids and adults lessons)
- Childcare Centre (for kids 3 months - 5 years)
- Snowboard and Ski Rentals
- Café and Bar (food, hot drinks and alcohol)
- Rental Shop,
- Ski Patrol
- Medical Centre

=== Getting to Treble Cone ===
Treble Cone is a 35-minute drive from Wānaka or a 90-minute drive from Queenstown. During the winter, various options are available, including door to door shuttles from both, Queenstown and Wānaka as well as flights from Queenstown.

=== Aspiring Avalanche Dogs ===
Based at Treble Cone, Aspiring Avalanche dogs is a non-profit organisation and a registered charity that provides a primary response avalanche search dog service to the ski areas and backcountry of the Southern Lakes Region. The highly trained dog teams can be rapidly deployed around the clock to help locate skiers, snowboarders and mountaineers unlucky enough to be caught in an avalanche.

=== Rookie Academy ===
Based at Treble Cone, Rookie Academy is a world-class incubator of ski and snowboard instructor training. Rookie Academy runs instructor training courses from 2 weeks to 11 weeks in duration, aiming at preparing candidates for NZSIA, BASI, CSIA, (Canadian association of Snowboard Instructors (CASI)), PSIA instructor exams.

=== Ski Patrol Certificate ===
Run by Tai Poutini Polytechnic at Treble Cone, students train towards completing a Certificate Level 3 in Ski Patrol, providing them with the skills required for a role as a first year ski patroller. Many of the successful candidates go on to work as ski patrollers throughout the world as well as guiding, backcountry touring and emergency care and safety management.

=== Season pass prices ===
Treble Cone controversially raised its season pass prices for the 2007 season to NZ$2200 after 31 May, with “early bird” pre-season passes being NZ$1500. The early bird pass was a free upgrade from a 50-day season pass to a premium pass due to public and local community consultation. There have been many letters to newspapers and a general upset towards Treble Cone. Treble Cone management has released media statements

In 2008, the company was required to raise extra capital from its shareholders to cover the loss. Season pass pricing was determined to be the problem. As a result, pre-season passes for 2009 were dropped to $990. Locals have strongly supported the change.

== Summer activities ==
Historically, Treble Cone has opened the six seater chairlift for hiking and mountain biking. In 2007, this included hosting the first downhill event of the NZ Community Trust National Series in the weekend. 195 riders raced against the clock on the 2.5 km downhill trail. Currently, there are no plans to continue the summer field operations.

== Proposed gondola ==
The gondola was approved late in 2008, with a 10-year building consent. Due to the current economic climate, there appears to be no desire to install the lift in the short term.

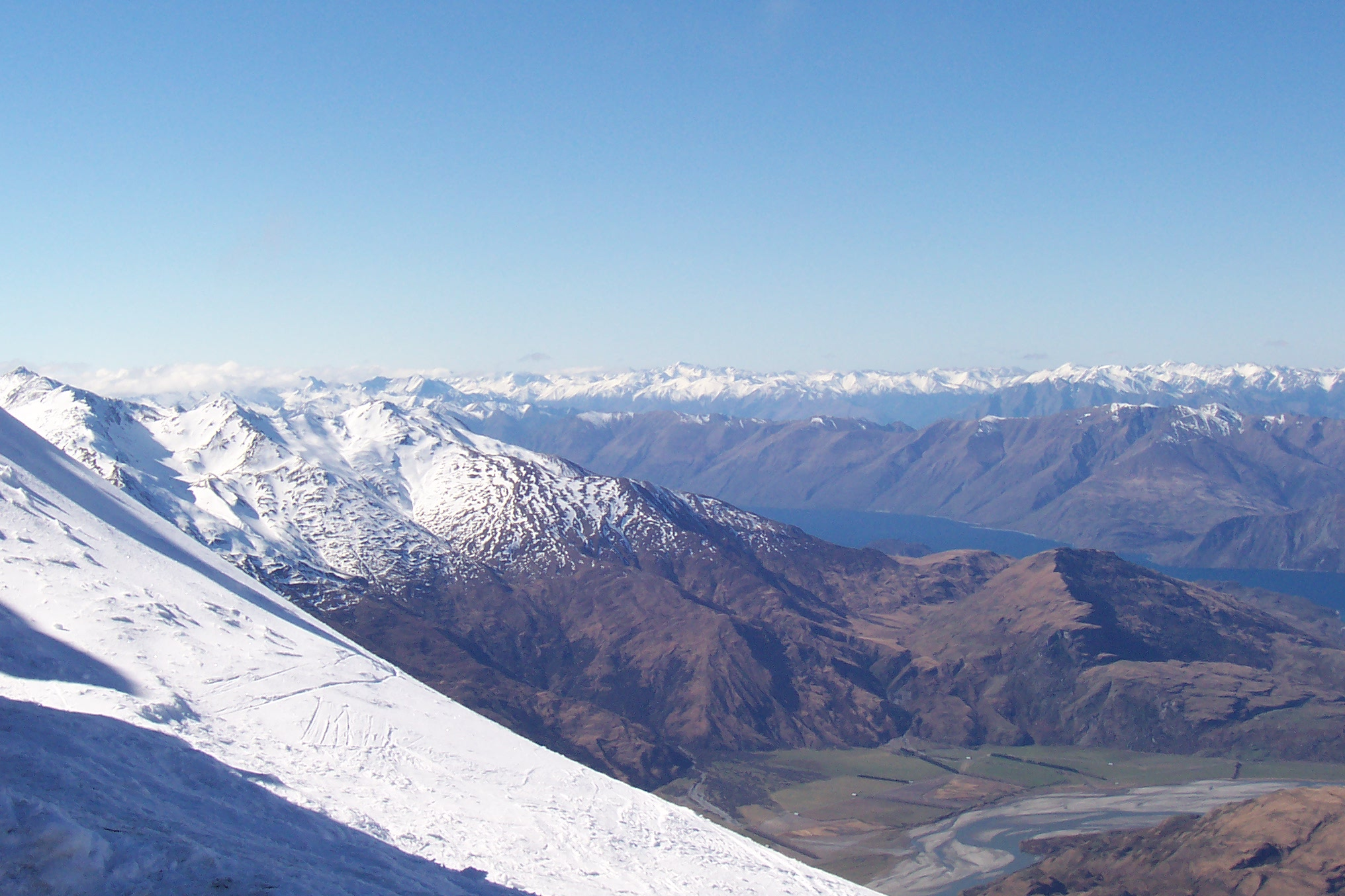
View from Treble Cone of Matukituki Valley floor

On Friday 14 July 2006, The Press ran a story on Treble Cone Investments lodging resource consent applications regarding a proposed gondola from Cattle Flat (at the base of the ski field access road) to the ski field itself. The proposed gondola would travel 3.3 km in under 11 minutes, and be capable of carrying 2000 people an hour. It would rise 945 m.

Talk of a gondola has been around for some time, but has been re-ignited recently due to the deaths of three young Australian skiers when they drove off the access road in 2004. The access road is under regular criticism from patrons because of its corrugations, steep incline with tight switchbacks and lack of safety barriers. It also coincides with other objectives for the ski field, said Treble Cone director, Richard Hanson. An increase in ticket prices in 2006 seems to be to help the funding of the building project. On good days the field is always short of car parking, and cars may be parked up to a kilometre down the access road. Because of these reasons the gondola is a very popular proposal with locals except for the likelihood of more overcrowding at the resort.
