= Hursthouse =

Hursthouse may refer to:

- Charles Flinders Hursthouse (1817–1876), New Zealand settler, writer
- Charles Wilson Hursthouse (1841–1911), New Zealand surveyor, public servant, politician, soldier
- Richmond Hursthouse (1845–1902), New Zealand politician
- Rosalind Hursthouse (born 1943), New Zealand moral philosopher
