= Charles Hursthouse =

Charles Hursthouse may refer to:

- Charles Flinders Hursthouse (1817–1876), English-born settler in New Zealand
- Charles Wilson Hursthouse (1841–1911), English-born New Zealand surveyor, public servant, politician, and soldier
