= Torchy Atkinson =

Horticultural scientist, scientific administrator (1909–1990)

Torchy Atkinson OBE
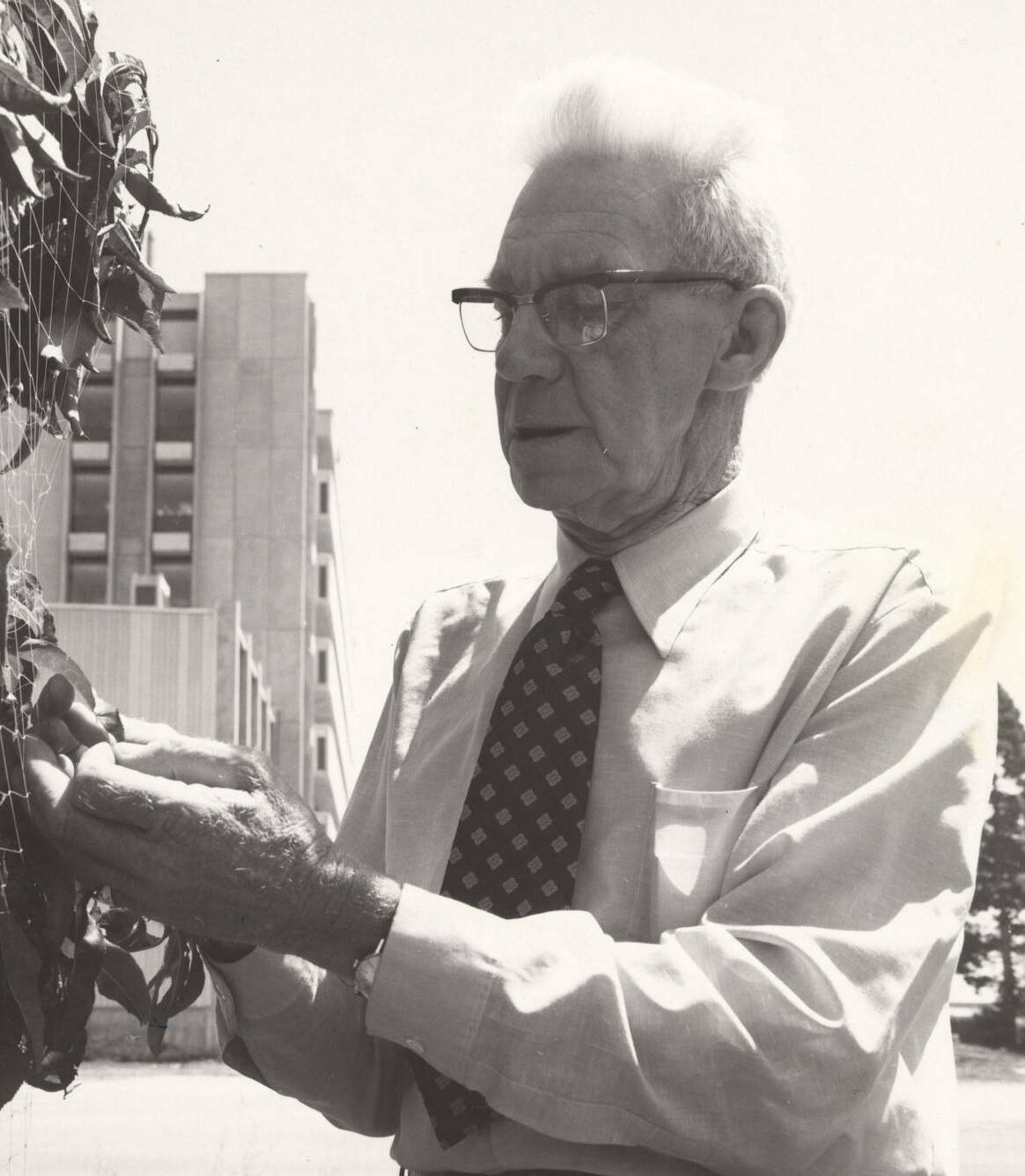
- Born: John Dunstan Atkinson; 3 March 1909; Wellington, New Zealand
- Died: 27 February 1990 (aged 80); Birkdale, Auckland, New Zealand
- Spouse: Ethel Thorp (m. 1934)
- Children: 2
- Relatives: Harry Atkinson (grandfather); Richmond Hursthouse (grandfather); Bruce Stocker (cousin); Monica Brewster (cousin); Harry Atkinson (cousin); Charles Wilson Hursthouse (great-uncle); Arthur Atkinson (great-uncle)
- Scientific career
- Thesis: Studies on the dieback of lacebarks, Myxosporium hoheria. n.f.sp (1932)

John Dunstan "Torchy" Atkinson OBE (3 March 1909 – 27 February 1990) was a New Zealand horticultural scientist and scientific administrator.

Atkinson was born in Wellington, New Zealand on 3 March 1909. His father was the solicitor Arnold Atkinson (1874–1917), and his mother was Mary Herrick Atkinson (née Hursthouse). He was known as Duncan by his family, but friends and colleagues almost all referred to him as Torchy for his red hair, and the name stuck even after he had turned grey. New Zealand's tenth Premier, Sir Harry Atkinson, was his grandfather.

Atkinson wrote his master's thesis at Massey University in 1932 with the title Studies on the dieback of lacebarks, Myxosporium hoheria. n.f.sp. He was the director of Fruit Research Station of the Department of Scientific and Industrial Research (DSIR), and later the director of the Plant Diseases Division. His research has contributed significantly to New Zealand's strong position as an exporter of fruit. After his retirement in 1974, he was commissioned to write the history of the DSIR. In the 1975 New Year Honours, Atkinson was appointed an Officer of the Order of the British Empire, for services to scientific research.

Atkinson died at Birkdale, Auckland, on 27 February 1990.
