= Kahutoi Te Kanawa =

New Zealand university teacher, curator, weaver and textile artist (born 1960)

- Born: 1960 (age 65–66)
- Occupations: University teacher, weaver and textile artist
- Known for: weaving and artworks
- Mother: Diggeress Te Kanawa

Kahutoi Mere Te Kanawa (born 1960) is a New Zealand Māori university teacher, curator, weaver and textile artist. Her works have been collected and displayed both nationally and internationally. She has worked as a senior lecturer at the University of Otago and a curator at the Auckland War Memorial Museum. Te Kanawa is member of the Auckland War Memorial Museum Te Awa project team. This project uses the expertise of Māori specialists such as Te Kanawa to enrich the information on Māori taonga in the collection of the Museum.

== Personal life ==
Te Kanawa has tribal affiliations to Ngāti Maniapoto, Tainui (including Ngāti Rārua) and Ngāti Tūwharetoa. She is the sister of Rangi Te Kanawa, daughter of Diggeress Te Kanawa and granddaughter of Dame Rangimārie Hetet.

== Selected publications ==
- Smith, C. A., White, M., & Te Kanawa, K. (2011). The preservation of Māori textiles: Collaboration, research and cultural meaning. In Cultural Heritage/Cultural Identity–The Role of Conservation. Preprints of the 16th Triennial ICOM-CC Conference.
- Te Kanawa, K., (2009) Toi Maramatanga: a visual Māori art expression of meaning. Master of Arts thesis, Auckland University of Technology, Auckland.
- Te Kanawa, K. (2006). Mai i te ao kohatu: weaving – an artform derived from mātauranga Māori as a gift from the ancestors. In Turoua Ngā Whetū Research Colloquium. Te Tumu – School of Māori, Pacific and Indigenous Studies, University of Otago, Dunedin.
- Wood, B., Henare, A., Lander, M., and Te Kanawa, K. (2003). Visiting the house of gifts: the 1998 ‘Maori’ exhibition at the British Museum. Journal of New Zealand Literature 21: 83–101.
