= Te Mahuki =

Māori prophet

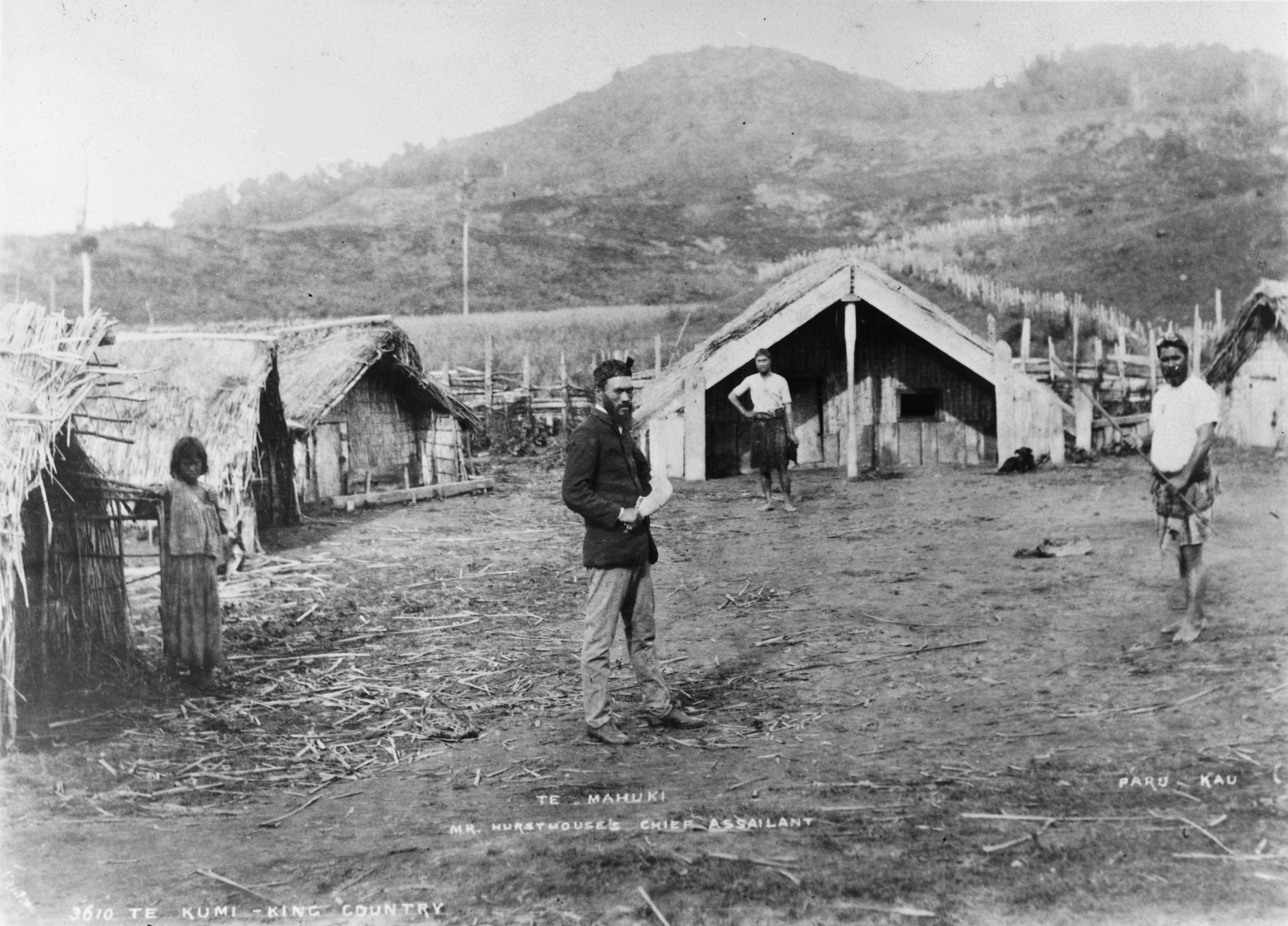
Te Mahuki (centre) in 1885 at Te Kumi in the Waitomo District

Te Mahuki (c1840–1899) was a notable New Zealand tribal prophet who believed he was an Israelite sent to find the promised land. Of Māori descent, he identified with the Ngāti Kinohaku and Ngāti Maniapoto iwi. He was born in Te Kumi, King Country, New Zealand.

== Life ==
Te Mahuki bitterly resented Pākehā settlement in New Zealand, having been among the ploughmen jailed for being at Parihaka when it was invaded. He was fiercely opposed to all aspects of Paheka culture being adopted by Māori. He had taken part in the First Taranaki War in 1860 against the instructions of the Maori king. He led a kidnapping of a surveyor Charles Hursthouse, for whom he had a bitter hatred. Hursthouse and Wetere Te Rerenga were surveying the path of the North Island Main Trunk railway line on land that had been purchased by the government from Ngati Maniapoto when he was captured. Hursthouse and the others escaped with the help of a rescue party. A few days later Te Mahuki and his followers marched unarmed on Pirongia to protest against the co-operation of Ngāti Maniapoto chiefs with the railway survey. He was arrested and jailed. In 1885 he posed for this photograph outside the hut, where he had kept Hursthouse. Later he and his followers took over stores in Te Kūiti and he was arrested again. He was jailed for 12 months. In 1897 he set fire to a store in Te Kuiti and was jailed again. He was certified insane and sent to Auckland Lunatic Asylum where he died.
