= Te Kumi railway station =

Defunct railway station in New Zealand

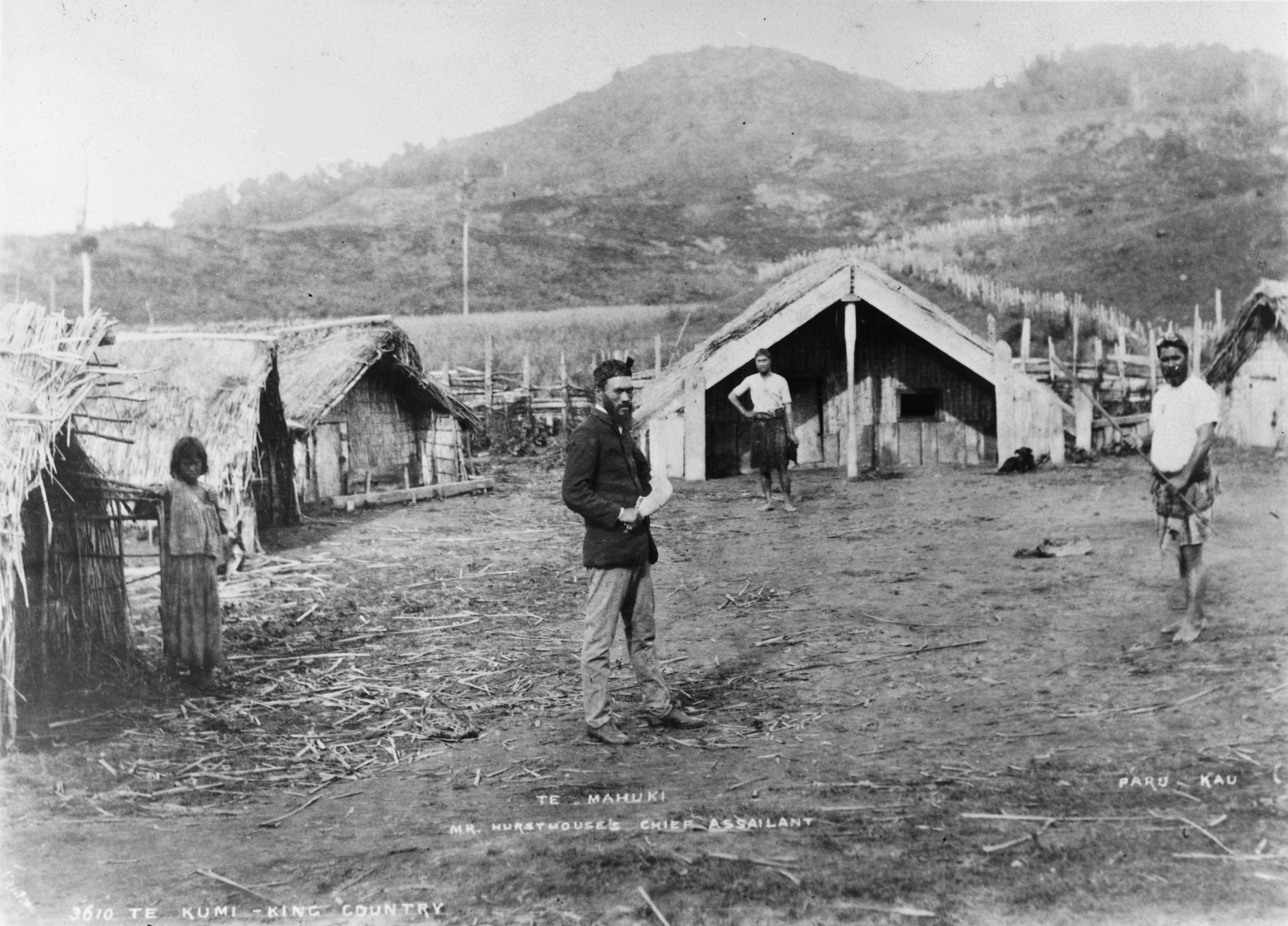
- Te Kumi in 1885

General information
- Location: New Zealand
- Coordinates: 38.309000°S 175.151700°E
- Elevation: 49 m (161 ft)
- Line: North Island Main Trunk
- Distance: Wellington 479 km (298 mi)

History
- Opened: 2 September 1887 goods 2 December 1887 passenger
- Closed: 14 October 1968
- Electrified: June 1988

Services
Preceding station	Historical railways	Following station
Hangatiki; Line open, station closed 6.2 km (3.9 mi)	North Island Main Trunk; KiwiRail	Te Kuiti; Line open, station closed 4.34 km (2.70 mi)
Location

Te Kumi railway station was a station on the North Island Main Trunk in New Zealand. The railway had been delayed by Māori opposition to it entering King Country and Te Kumi was one of the last places where such resistance was shown.

After being arrested at Parihaka in 1879, Ngāti Kinohaku were returned to Te Kumu, where they tried to establish a similar settlement. In March 1883, Charles Wilson Hursthouse was held at Te Kumi by Te Mahuki, whilst surveying for the railway. Te Mahuki posed for a photograph at Te Kumi in 1885, after serving a year of hard labour.

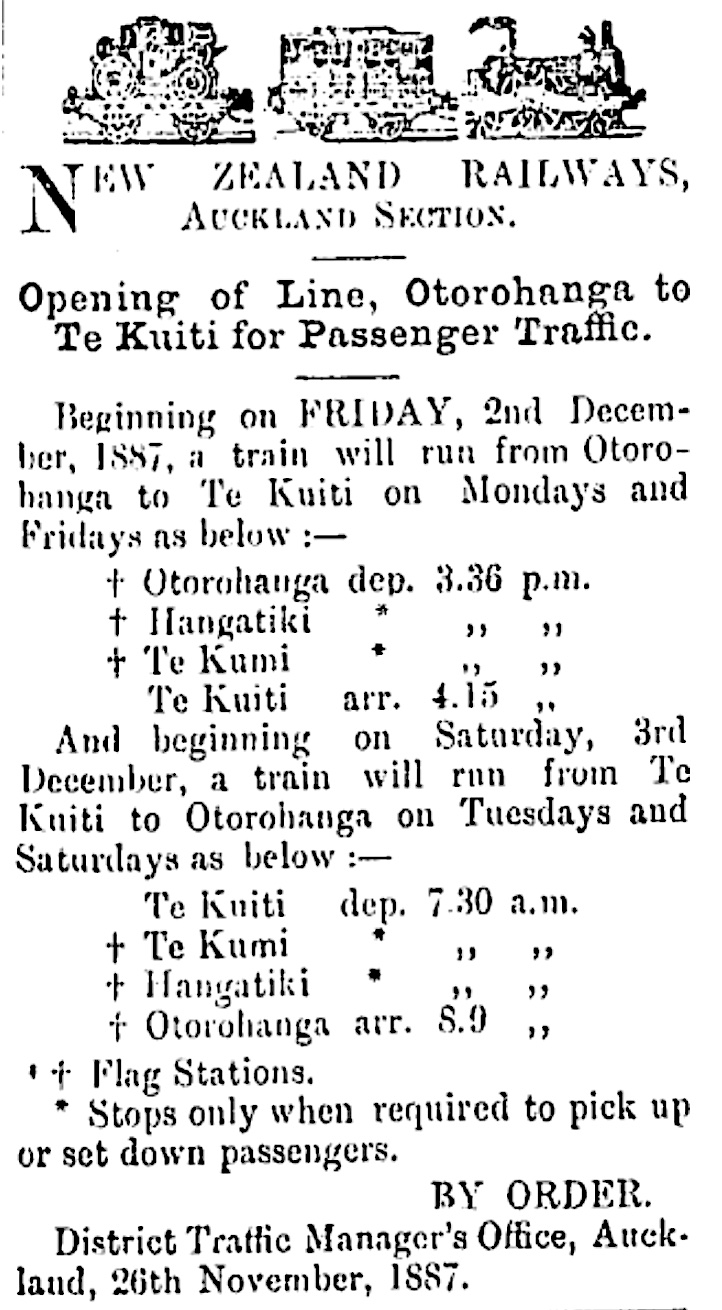
1887 Ōtorohanga-Te Kuiti timetable

Te Kumi railway station opened with the section from Ōtorohanga to Te Kuiti, for which Coates & Metcalfe were the contractors, having started work in 1886. It opened on 2 September 1887 for goods and three months later for passengers, initially with two trains a week. £122.1s was spent on creating a shelter shed and platform for a flag station at Te Kumi. Urinals were added in 1897, a 22 ft (6.7 m) by 14 ft (4.3 m) goods shed in 1899 (though possibly in use from 1897), cattle and sheep yards and a passing loop for 22 wagons, in 1905, and a loading bank in 1911. Railway houses were built in 1920.

Superfine Lime Siding was 2.94 km (1.83 mi) to the north. It was in use from at least 1937 to 1987. There was no sign of a siding by 2001, though a caption on Flickr in 2016 mentioned lime transported in containers by rail from the works, now owned by Omya.

Te Kuiti Lime siding was 1.31 km (0.81 mi) to the south. The lime and aggregates quarry was rebuilt in 1912 after a fire.

Just a single track and a sub station now remain.
