= Ne'er-do-well =

Derogatory term for a good-for-nothing person

"Ne'er-do-well" is a derogatory term for a good-for-nothing person; or a rogue, vagrant or vagabond without means of support. It is a contraction of the phrase never-do-well.

== Colonial context ==
The term ne'er-do-well was used in the nineteenth-century Australasian colonies to denote young British and Irish men seen as undesirable. These men were typically thought to be the younger sons of wealthy families who had somehow failed to fulfill their potential, so they were sent to the colonies to 'improve' themselves. Sometimes called 'remittance men' because they relied on payments from their families, other colonists held that these men typically spent this money on drinking and gambling, and feared they would be a threat to the natural order of society.

Starting in the mid-nineteenth century, the term started to appear in migrant accounts, travel journals and reformist tracts. In 1851, George Hepburn wrote a diary throughout his voyage to Dunedin. He described the 'would be gentlemen' on board who drank constantly as 'scamps who acted the tomfoolery'. Some writers advised against these types of men from emigrating such as Charles Flinders Hursthouse who warned that the 'idle ne'er-do-well' should stay at home, because they were 'far above work, and far beneath it'.

When, in 1873, the New Zealand Government introduced the Imbecile Passengers Act, Colonial Secretary Daniel Pollen described this legislation as necessary due to the increasing numbers of 'half-scamps, half-lunatics' sent to the colony by friends and family. Pollen warned that this practice has led to the 'large proportion of lunatics' who needed costly maintenance in institutions. This appears to be a direct political response to the anxiety about the numbers of ne'er-do-wells arriving in New Zealand in this period.

== See also ==
- Beachcomber
