= Diggeress Te Kanawa =

New Zealand Māori weaver (1920–2009)

Diggeress Rangituatahi Te Kanawa CNZM QSO (9 March 1920 – 30 July 2009) was a New Zealand Māori tohunga raranga (master weaver) of Ngāti Maniapoto and Ngāti Kinohaku descent. At the time of her death she was regarded as New Zealand's most renowned weaver.

== Biography ==
Born in Te Kūiti in 1920 to Dame Rangimārie Hetet and Tuheka Taonui Hetet, Te Kanawa was named Diggeress in honour of the World War I diggers after her father served in the New Zealand (Māori) Pioneer Battalion. This was commonly shortened to Digger until the 1970s. She came from a family renowned for its weaving tradition and was taught weaving by her mother, Dame Rangimārie Hetet, and other kuia. Through her mother, Te Kanawa's grandfather was Charles Wilson Hursthouse and her great-uncles included Richmond Hursthouse and Henry Richmond.

Te Kanawa married Tana Te Kanawa at 20 and they had 12 children, raising them at Oparure, near Te Kūiti. Through Tana she is aunt to opera singer Kiri Te Kanawa. Her children include Rangi Te Kanawa, a museum professional and textile conservator specialising in Māori textiles and Kahutoi Te Kanawa, also a museum professional and weaver.

== Weaving ==
Te Kanawa is remembered as a teacher of weaving, on marae, and at the tertiary institution Te Wānanga o Aotearoa and at events. She taught weaving to renowned weavers such as Maureen Lander and also passed on her expertise on traditional methods of preparing the harakeke and earthen dyes.

She intentionally used a wide variety of techniques when weaving to encourage their survival.

As a member of the Māori Women's Welfare League she contributed to the resurgence of Māori weaving traditions during the 1950s. In 1983 Te Kanawa co-founded what would become Te Roopu Raranga Whatu o Aotearoa with others including Emily Schuster of Māori Arts and Crafts Institute in Rotorua.

She travelled extensively to catalogue taonga obtained by foreign museums during the colonial era. In 1987 Te Kanawa travelled to the Museum of Brisbane in Australia to demonstrate and talk on the art of Māori weaving. In 1988 she and Emily Schuster travelled to museums in Britain and the United States to study taonga and obtain information about past weaving techniques.

Her work is not widely held in museums, being mainly made for specific people. However a collection of 12 of her kahu huruhuru (woven muka cloaks, feathered on one side), made for her children, is held in trust at the Waikato Museum in Hamilton. In 1989 Te Kanawa and her mother were commissioned to make a cloak to celebrate the 25th anniversary of the founding of the University of Waikato. In 2006 she completed a commissioned korowai made of kiwi feathers for King Tuheitia as a statement of support for the Kingitanga. The British Museum holds a feather cloak, kahu huruhuru, made by Te Kanawa in 1994. Te Kanawa described the cloak as a korowai kakahu. It is made entirely of flax fibre, in double-pair twining weave. The feathers, forming a horizontal band pattern, are of three kinds blue and white from pūkeko, and red from pheasant. There are two rows of openwork between the upper edge and the feathers.

== Honours and awards ==
In the 1988 New Year Honours, Te Kanawa was appointed a Companion of the Queen's Service Order for community service, and two years later she was awarded the New Zealand 1990 Commemoration Medal. In the 2000 New Year Honours, she was appointed a Companion of the New Zealand Order of Merit, for services to Māori arts and crafts.

In 2001 Te Kanawa was awarded the Sir Kingi Ihaka award by the Māori Arts Board. She was an inaugural recipient of the Arts Foundation of New Zealand Icons award in 2003.

In 2007 Te Kanawa received an honorary doctorate from the University of Waikato.

== Selected publications ==
- Weaving a kakahu by Diggeress Te Kanawa. Bridget Williams Books, 1992. ISBN 0-908912-08-0
- Te aho tapu / the sacred thread by Diggeress Te Kanawa. Exhibition guide. Waikato Museum of Art and History, 2004.
- Weaving a kakahu by Diggeress Te Kanawa. Puwaha ki te Ao Trust, 2006. ISBN 978-0-473-11796-2 / ISBN 0-473-11796-7

== Selected exhibitions ==
- Contemporary Maori Art Waikato Museum of Art and History, Hamilton (1976)
- Craft New Zealand Europe (1978 - 1980)
- Rangimarie Hetet and Diggeress Te Kanawa: Korowai Weavers Waikato Museum of Art and History, Hamilton (1979)
- South Pacific Festival Port Moresby Museum, Port Moresby, Papua New Guinea (1980)
- Feathers and Fibre Rotorua Art Gallery, Rotorua (1982)
- Te Amokura o te Māori (1986)
- Rotorua National Hui (1990)
- Te Waka Toi: Contemporary Māori Art from New Zealand Toured the United States of America (1992–1993)
- Paa Harakeke (2002).
- Te Aho Tapu / The Sacred Thread (2004)
- E Nga Uri Whakatupu - Weaving Legacies: Dame Rangimarie Hetet and Diggeress Te Kanawa Waikato Museum Te Whare Taonga o Waikato. (2014)
