= Leila Hurle =

Principal, senior school inspector

Leila Agnes Sophie Hurle (5 June 1901 – 24 February 1989) was a New Zealand principal and senior school inspector. She was born in New Plymouth, New Zealand on 5 June 1901. She is buried at Te Henui Cemetery in New Plymouth.

As a high school student at New Plymouth Girls’ High School in 1920, Hurle won honorable mention in the Royal Colonial Institute Essay Competition, open to students in all the British colonies, and won the Empire Day Essay Challenge Cup for her school. She received a Master of Arts from Otago University, where she won the James Clark Prize in Latin. She worked at New Plymouth Girls’ High School for five years, studied French at the Sorbonne, and returned to New Zealand to teach languages at Christchurch Girls' High School for eight years, before being appointed as headmaster of Timaru Girls' High School in 1938. She returned to New Plymouth Girls’ High School as headmaster in 1942, a position she held in parallel to being a school inspector. In 1947, she led the inaugural panel selecting students for post-primary teacher training bursaries.

New Plymouth Girls' High School awards a Leila Hurle prize at its annual prize giving.
