= Hangatiki railway station =

Defunct railway station in New Zealand

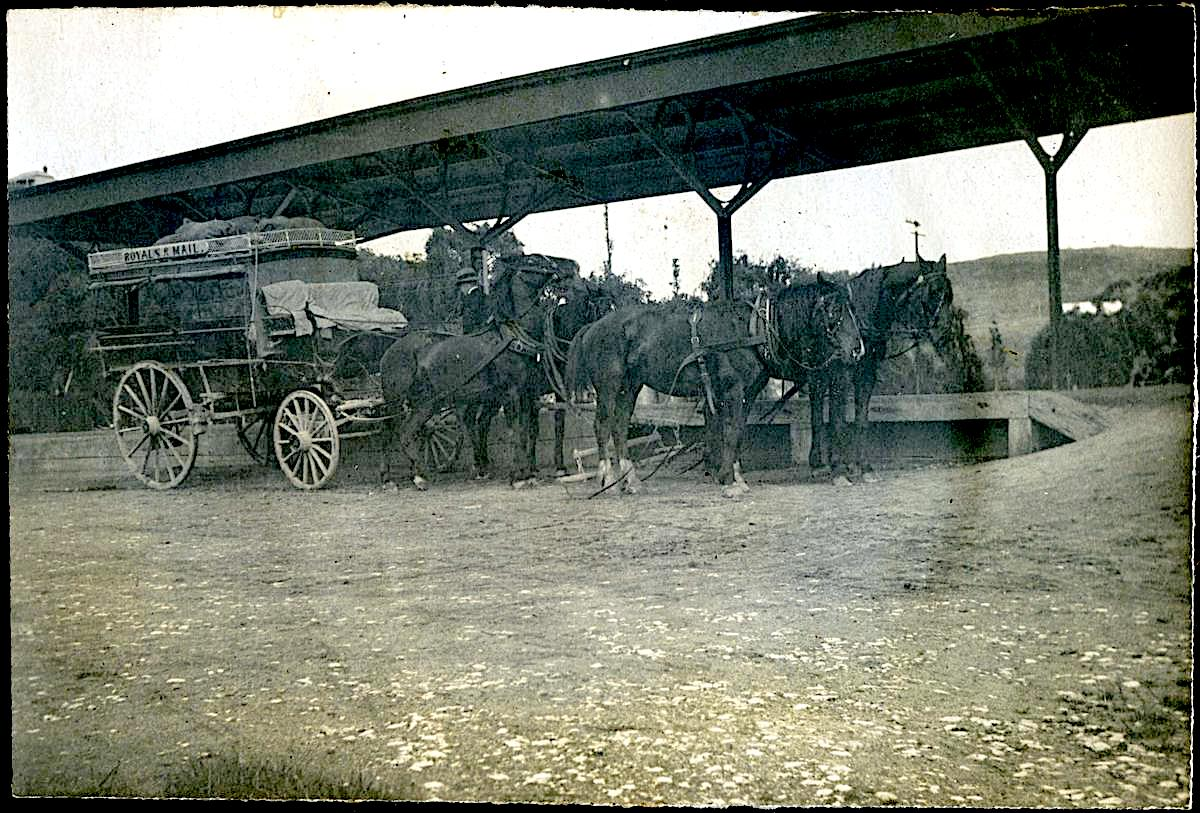
- Waitomo Caves Royal Mail coach at Hangatiki in 1920

General information
- Location: New Zealand
- Coordinates: 38.260559°S 175.181379°E
- Elevation: 40 m (130 ft)
- Line: North Island Main Trunk
- Distance: Wellington 485.2 km (301.5 mi)

History
- Opened: 2 December 1887
- Closed: 31 January 1982 passenger, 13 October 1986 goods
- Electrified: June 1988

Services
Preceding station	Historical railways	Following station
Ōtorohanga; Line open, station open 9.21 km (5.72 mi)	North Island Main Trunk; KiwiRail	Te Kumi; Line open, station closed 6.2 km (3.9 mi)
Location

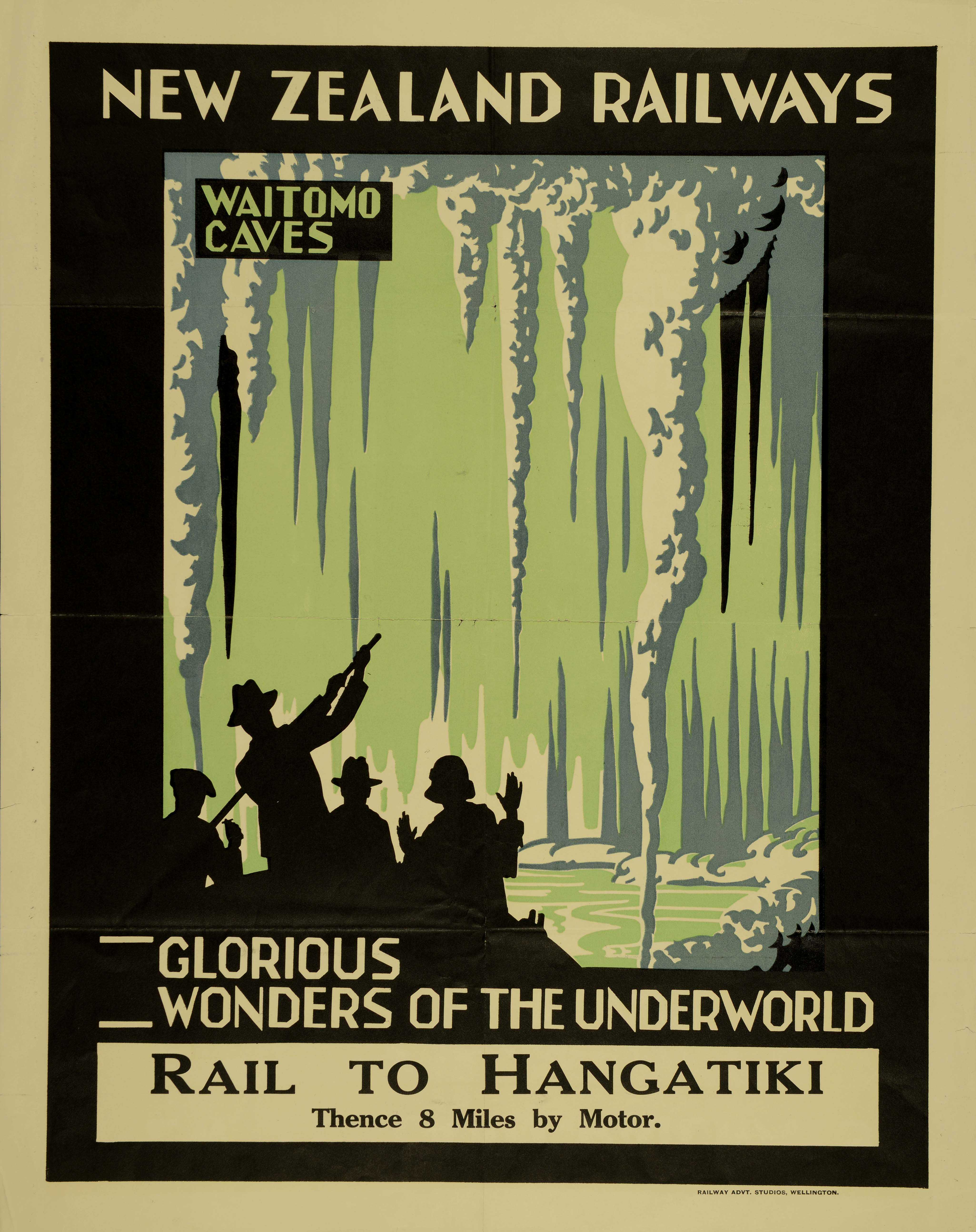
1927 poster advertising Hangatiki as the gateway to sightseeing at Waitomo Caves.

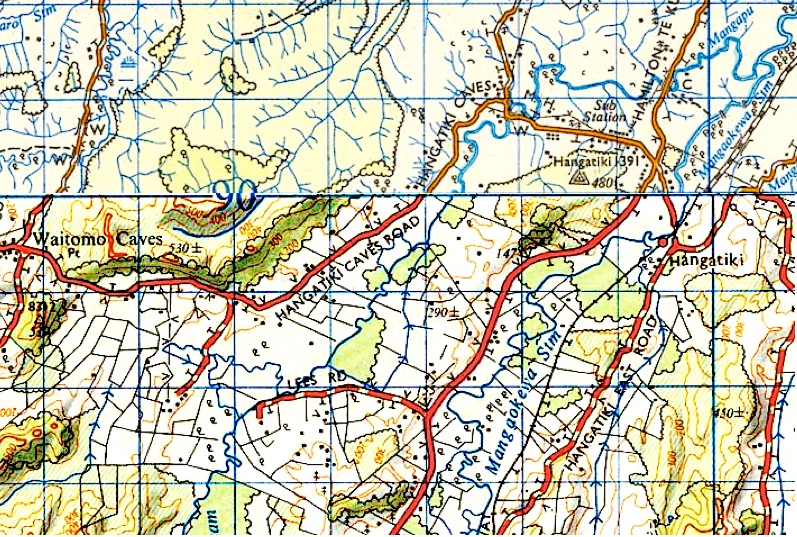
1955 (north), 1971 (south) one inch to one mile map (Source- Land Information New Zealand (LINZ) and licensed by LINZ for re-use under the Creative Commons Attribution 3.0 New Zealand licence)

Hangatiki railway station was a flag station on the North Island Main Trunk in New Zealand.

In 1915 Hangatiki was described as a small township with a post and telegraph office, where passengers for "the famous Waitomo and Ruakuri caves alight". The guidebook said Waitomo was 6 mi (9.7 km) away, "by good metalled road, a conveyance meeting the express trains and conveying passengers to the excellent Government Accommodation House at Waitomo." The fare was 2/6 each way (about $18 in 2015 money).

== History ==
Coates & Metcalfe were the contractors for the 11 mi 41 ch (18.5 km) extension of this section of the NIMT, from Ōtorohanga to Te Kuiti. The station area had been levelled by May 1886. Until August 1887, the contractors provided goods trains. By October 1887 goods trains ran on Mondays and Fridays. New Zealand Railways Department took over from the contractors, adding a passenger service was added on those days from 2 December 1887. By 1896 there was a shelter shed, platform, cart approach, 31 ft (9.4 m) by 21 ft (6.4 m) goods shed and a passing loop for 35 wagons. In 1901 there was a petition for cattle yards and by 1911 there were cattle and sheep yards. A tablet porter started in 1912. A note in 1963 said the station was built in 1888 and last painted in 1953, but in 1980 the station building was noted as a concrete block and the loop as taking 75 wagons. On 31 January 1982 Hangatiki closed to all traffic except in wagon lots.
