= Cyril Croker =

New Zealand politician (1888–1958)

The Honourable Cyril Croker

Member of the New Zealand Legislative Council
- In office 27 July 1950 – 31 December 1950

Personal details
- Born: Cyril Hendry Croker; 27 March 1888 Christchurch, New Zealand
- Died: 16 October 1958 (aged 70) New Plymouth, New Zealand
- Resting place: Te Henui Cemetery
- Party: National
- Spouse: Doris McCormick (m. 1921)
- Occupation: Solicitor

Cyril Hendry Croker (27 March 1888 – 16 October 1958) was a New Zealand solicitor and member of the Legislative Council. He was a leading sportsman in his youth. He went to World War I in France in 1918 and returned to England sick within days. Active in the National Party, he was an electorate chairman for many years. In 1950, when the first First National Government wanted to disestablish the Legislative Council, Croker was appointed to that body as part of the suicide squad.

== Early life ==
Croker was born in Christchurch on 27 March 1888. His parents were Diana Valentine and James Taylor Croker. His father spent his entire working life with the Loan and Mercantile Company and until 1899, he was based in Blenheim. Croker Jr attended Blenheim Borough School. When the family moved to Dunedin, Croker Jr attended Otago Boys' High School. He then attended law school at the University of Otago and sat his examinations in 1908.

Croker was a sportsmen in his younger years and won the cross-country running championships of Otago in 1907. He later broke the Otago 3-mile record. At Otago University, he won blues in 1-mile and 3-mile running. Croker also took up golf. He last appears in the golf results in Dunedin in December 1911 and left the city on 6 December 1911 for Stratford. From early 1912, he played in Stratford in Taranaki.

== Military career ==
In December 1911, Croker's commission as a lieutenant with the Otago Rifles was gazetted. He resigned this commission in October 1913. He tried to enlist in early 1916 but was told that he was medically unfit. A year later, he was accepted, though. In 1918, he applied to be reappointed to his commission and engaged the services of Charles Skerrett KC to assist him, but the military refused to reappoint him. His elder brother, Eric Robert Irving Croker, was killed in action on 16 April 1918 and his death was advertised on 10 May. Croker sailed to London on the SS Ionic from Wellington on 16 May 1918 as a corporal and transferred to France but within days, he was returned to England with bronchitis; he remained there until after the end of the war.

== Professional and political career ==
Croker received his legal training from Hosking and Cooke (John Hosking and David Cooke) in Dunedin, where he worked as clerk for Hosking. He was admitted to the bar while he was still in Dunedin. In December 1911, he moved to Stratford where he was clerk for the solicitor William George Malone until May 1913, when he moved to Hastings. Croker worked in Hastings on his own account. With a view of war service, Croker took on Cecil Duff as a legal partner in February 1917, with Duff providing ongoing service while Croker was either in camp or in active service. In August 1917, Croker was granted one month's leave from military camp as Duff had fallen ill.

Returning to New Zealand from England in May 1919, Croker bought the practice of Alexander Johnstone in New Plymouth in August 1919, as Johnstone moved to Auckland in October 1919. Despite Johnstone's absence, the firm used the name Croker and Johnstone until mid-1921. From December 1920, Croker had an additional office in Ōpunake open once a week. Campbell McCormick was his managing clerk and in October 1922, he made McCormick a partner in the firm, which was then known as Croker and McCormick. Later on, Ronald Charles Greiner became another partner.

From 1919 to 1923, he was a councillor of the Taranaki District Law Society. From 1919 to 1924, he was vice president of the Returned Servicemen's Association (RSA) in New Plymouth. He was president of the Taranaki Racing Owners' and Breeders' Association and an executive member of the New Zealand association. He was appointed to life membership and became a patron of the New Plymouth Harrier Club. From 1928, he owned Waikaraka Station, a sheep farm in Hawke's Bay.

Croker was chairman of the National Party of the New Plymouth electorate for many years. He was an executive member of the party's Wellington division from 1940. He was appointed to the New Zealand Legislative Council on 27 July 1950 as a member of the suicide squad by the First National Government in 1950 to vote for the abolition of the Council. Most of the new members were appointed on 22 June 1950, but four more members—including Croker—were appointed on 27 July 1950. Legislative councillors voted on 15 August 1950 for the abolition of the upper house. The 1950 parliamentary session ended on 1 December, which is when the legislative councillors last met. Membership of the legislative councillors ceased on 31 December 1950, with the Legislative Council Abolition Bill 1950 coming into force on 1 January 1951.

== Personal and family ==
On 3 June 1921, Croker and Doris McCormick married in Wellington. His wife was from Napier. After the wedding, they visited his birth city of Christchurch. He was interested in horse racing and owned several racehorses. He died on 16 October 1958 at New Plymouth aged 70. He was buried at Te Henui Cemetery and survived by his wife and three children.

Croker had two brothers. His elder brother Eric was killed in 1918 in World War I. His younger brother Basil, who was also a solicitor, died in 1943 aged 44. Doris Croker died in 1965.
