= Monica Brewster =

New Zealand arts patron and women's rights advocate

- Born: Monica Romaine Govett; 10 February 1886; New Plymouth, New Zealand
- Died: 13 December 1973 (aged 87); New Plymouth, New Zealand
- Known for: Founding benefactor of Govett-Brewster Art Gallery
- Relatives: Harry Atkinson (grandfather); Torchy Atkinson (cousin); Harry Atkinson (cousin)

Monica Romaine Brewster (née Govett; 10 February 1886 – 13 December 1973) was a New Zealand arts patron and women's rights advocate. She is best known as the founding benefactor of the Govett-Brewster Art Gallery.

== Early life ==
Born on 10 February 1886 in New Plymouth, New Zealand, she was the youngest of four daughters. Her father was Clement Govett, barrister and founder of the Govett-Quilliam law firm. Her paternal grandfather was Henry Govett, vicar of St Mary's Church and first archdeacon of Taranaki. Her mother was Frances Elizabeth Atkinson. Brewster's maternal grandfather was Harry Atkinson, Premier of New Zealand for five terms during 1876 to 1891.

She attended Wanganui Girls' College, and Chetwode School in New Plymouth. She married Rex Carrington Brewster at Wanganui on 21 September 1920. A doctor, he had served as a medical officer with the New Zealand Medical Corps in Palestine during World War I, and was awarded the Military Cross in February 1918. His grandfather was the surveyor Octavius Carrington, who was the brother of Frederic Carrington, regarded as the "father of New Plymouth".

== Career ==
With a privileged background and as a major benefactor of her father's estate (her parents died in 1914 and 1918), Brewster had the means to pursue her interests in travel, the arts and culture.

Brewster was active in the Taranaki Women's Club, established in 1926, becoming president in 1931. She was a representative on the National Council of Women and helped found the Pukeiti Rhododendron Trust.

In 1939, in the months preceding World War II, Brewster and her friend, Elsie Andrews, courted controversy when they publicly declared that they were conscientious objectors.

Rex Brewster died in 1952 and the couple did not have any children. In 1962, she transferred £50,000 by trust deed to New Plymouth Council to establish an art gallery. The then-unused Regent cinema building in Queen Street was purchased and the Govett-Brewster Art Gallery was opened in 1970. Brewster later gifted $72,000 to create a collection.

Brewster died of pneumonia on 13 December 1973, and her ashes were buried at Te Henui Cemetery.

== Legacy ==
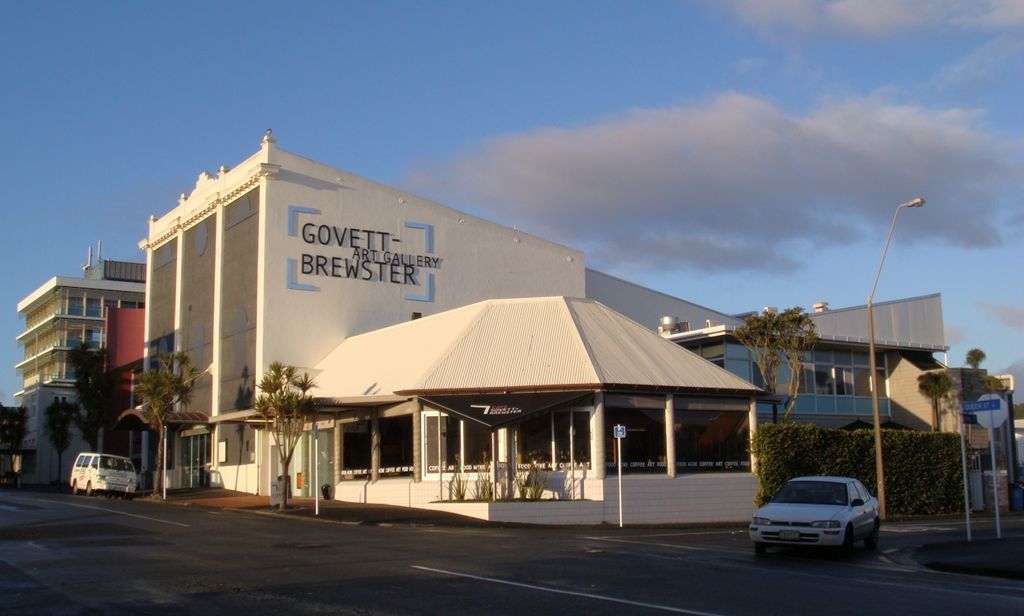
Govett-Brewster Art Gallery

The Govett-Brewster Art Gallery is a contemporary art gallery. In 2015, a café named "Monica's Eatery" was opened at the gallery. The gallery also hosts monthly events called "Monica Brewster Evenings", during which artists speak about their work.
