= Rangimārie Hetet =

Master weaver of Ngāti Maniapoto

Dame Rangimārie Hetet DBE
- Born: Rangimārie Hursthouse; 24 May 1892; Oparure, King Country, New Zealand
- Died: 14 June 1995 (aged 103)
- Occupation: Tohunga raranga
- Spouse: Tuheka Taonui Hetet (m. 1911; died 1938)
- Children: 5
- Parents: Charles Wilson Hursthouse; Mere Te Rongopāmamao Aubrey
- Relatives: Diggeress Te Kanawa (daughter); Rangi Hetet (grandson); Veranoa Hetet (great-granddaughter); Richmond Hursthouse (uncle)

Dame Rangimārie Hetet DBE (née Hursthouse, 24 May 1892 – 14 June 1995) was a New Zealand tohunga raranga, a master of Māori weaving.

== Early life ==
Hetet was born in Oparure, King Country, New Zealand on 24 May 1892, the daughter of Charles Wilson Hursthouse and Mere Te Rongopāmamao Aubrey. Te Rongopāmamao's mother was of Ngāti Kinohaku, and her father was English. Through her father, Hetet was a niece of Richmond Hursthouse and Henry Richmond.

As her father was generally away for survey work, Hetet grew up amongst Ngati Kinohaku, a hapū (sub-tribe) of Ngāti Maniapoto. In 1899, her father instructed for her to live with a European family at Paemako near Piopio, where she started her schooling. She was unhappy with the arrangements and a year later, she moved to live with an older half-sister in Kāwhia. After breaking her arm aged nine, she returned to live with her mother, and attended Te Kūiti Native School and then Oparure Native School. She was taught the art of weaving korowai (dressed flax cloaks) by her mother and by observing people in her family weaving kete, mats and cloaks.

Hetet was married to a carpenter Tuheka Taonui Hetet from 16 February 1911 until his death in 1938. They had two children before he went to fight in World War I, and another three after his return. He was in the Māori Battalion (A Company), and suffered gas poisoning while he was serving. Hetet's descendants include Rangi Te Kanawa and Veranoa Hetet.

== Career ==
In 1951 the Māori Women's Welfare League started; Hetet was a founding member. The League's original intentions included preserving Māori arts and crafts and there was an acknowledgement that the skills were in danger of dying out. Hetet and her daughter Diggeress Te Kanawa taught classes in weaving to share knowledge and expertise wider than their own iwi group, they were part of a small and significant number of experts who supported 'the survival of Māori weaving as an art form in modern times'. At the time tradition held that weavers should only teach members of their hapū, and specific patterns were restricted to those groups. Hetet offered to teach anyone who was willing to learn, regardless of iwi or hapū, and contrary to tradition. She composed a waiata for her descendants imploring them to uphold traditional Māori arts.

Together they taught raranga (basketry and mat-making) and mahi whatu (finely processed flax weaving). From that the 1950s onwards Hetet began to regularly produce cloaks and other items. Hetet also passed on her detailed knowledge of the different types of flax and other plants that provide the material to be weaved as well as how to produce and fix dyes to the fibres in preparation for weaving.

Hetet's work is known for the precise use of traditional weaving methods and materials In the 1960s it has been said she was "probably the greatest living proponent of korowai (cloak weaving); in her lifetime she was instrumental in the preservation and resurgence of traditional Māori weaving."

In 1982 Te Ohaki Māori Village and Crafts Centre was opened in Waitomo to showcase and pass on the knowledge of Hetet and Diggeress Te Kanawa.

The British Museum holds a plaited kete (basket) made by Hetet in 1993, when she was 100 years old. The kete is made from undyed flax woven in a plain check, and a three-strand braid beginning at the bottom. It has handles made of braided flax-fibre. The Otago Museum holds a kete, whatu huruhuru, made by Hetet using flax fibre and pheasant feathers.

== Honours and awards ==
Hetet was appointed a Member of the Order of the British Empire in the 1973 Queen's Birthday Honours, promoted to Commander of the Order of the British Empire in the 1984 Queen's Birthday Honours, and finally, in the 1992 Queen's Birthday Honours, elevated to Dame Commander of the Order of the British Empire, for services to traditional Māori arts and crafts. In 1993, Hetet was awarded the New Zealand Suffrage Centennial Medal.

Hetet was made a life member of the Māori Women's Welfare League. In 1974 Hetet was awarded a QEII Arts Council Fellowship, and in 1978 a Bank of New Zealand Weaving Award. She received the Mediawoman Award in 1982, and in 1986 an honorary doctorate from the University of Waikato. In 1992, Hetet was awarded the Governor-General Art Award, presented to her by Cath Tizard at the New Zealand Academy of Fine Arts in Wellington. The Academy had at that time an exhibition containing a "guest artist" section with works loaned by Hetet, Diggeress Te Kanawa and Kahu Te Kanawa.

In 2017, Hetet was selected as one of the Royal Society Te Apārangi's "150 women in 150 words", celebrating the contributions of women to knowledge in New Zealand.

== Exhibitions ==
- Contemporary Maori Art, Waikato Museum of Art and History, Hamilton (1976)
- Exhibition (1978) at the Dowse Gallery, Lower Hutt
- Craft New Zealand, Europe (1978–1980)
- Rangimarie Hetet and Diggeress Te Kanawa: Korowai Weavers, Waikato Museum of Art and History, Hamilton (1979)
- South Pacific Festival, Port Moresby Museum, Port Moresby, Papua New Guinea (1980)
- Feathers and Fibre, Rotorua Art Gallery, Rotorua (1982)
- Exhibition (1994), Museum of New Zealand Te Papa Tongarewa
- E Nga Uri Whakatupu - Weaving Legacies: Dame Rangimarie Hetet and Diggeress Te Kanawa, Waikato Museum Te Whare Taonga o Waikato. (2014)
