= Harry Atkinson (physicist) =

New Zealand physicist and science administrator (1929–2018)

- Born: Harry Hindmarsh Atkinson; 5 August 1929; Wellington, New Zealand
- Died: 30 December 2018 (aged 89); Oxfordshire, England
- Education: University of Cambridge
- Spouse: Anne Barrett (m. 1958)
- Children: Three
- Scientific career
- Workplaces: Atomic Energy Research Establishment; Rutherford Laboratory; Cabinet Office; Science Research Council
- Thesis: Small angle scattering of X-rays and neutrons from metals (1959)
- Doctoral advisor: Neville Mott
- Relatives: Harry Atkinson (grandfather); Arthur Atkinson (great-uncle); Maria Atkinson (great-aunt); Torchy Atkinson (cousin); Monica Brewster (cousin)

Harry Hindmarsh Atkinson (5 August 1929 – 30 December 2018) was a British physicist and science administrator. He served as chair of the European Space Agency Council between 1984 and 1987.

== Early life, family, and education ==
Born in Wellington, New Zealand, on 5 August 1929, Atkinson was the son of Constance Hindmarsh Atkinson (née Shields) and Harry Temple Atkinson, who served as head of the New Zealand Patent Office. His paternal grandfather was Harry Atkinson, who had been prime minister of New Zealand on four occasions between 1876 and 1891. The family moved to Nelson when Atkinson was 12 years old, and he was educated at Nelson College from 1942 to 1947.

Atkinson was influenced to study science by Thomas Easterfield, and graduated from Canterbury University College with a Master of Science with first-class honours in physics in 1953. He then began doctoral studies at Cornell University in the United States in 1954, but moved to the University of Cambridge and the Atomic Energy Research Establishment (AERE) under Neville Mott 18 months later, completing his PhD in 1959. The title of his thesis was Small angle scattering of X-rays and neutrons from metals.

In 1958, Atkinson married Anne Barrett in Cambridge, and the couple went on to have three children.

== Scientific career ==
After completing his doctorate, Atkinson remained at AERE at Harwell for several years, before moving to the nearby Rutherford Laboratory where he headed the general physics group for seven years. From 1968 to 1972, he was seconded to the office of the chief scientific advisor in the Cabinet Office in London, where he provided advice on a wide range of topics. Atkinson was appointed head of the Science Research Council astronomy and space division in 1972; his tenure saw Britain expand its research activity in astronomy, with new optical telescopes in Hawaii and the Canary Islands, and improvements to existing radio telescopes in England. When the European Space Agency (ESA) was formed in 1975, Atkinson became the British delegate to the ESA Council, and served as its vice chairman from 1981 to 1984 and chairman from 1984 to 1987. He also had operational oversight of several European nuclear physics research institutes during the 1980s.

== Later life and death ==
Although semi-retiring in 1990, Atkinson continued as chief scientist of the British insurance industry's Loss Prevention Council. In 2000, he chaired a task force investigating near-Earth objects, and in 2006 he was honoured when an asteroid orbiting the Sun between Mars and Jupiter was named 5972 Harryatkinson by the International Astronomical Union.

In his later years, Atkinson suffered from dementia, and he died in Oxfordshire on 30 December 2018.
