= Abraham Salaman =

New Zealand herbalist

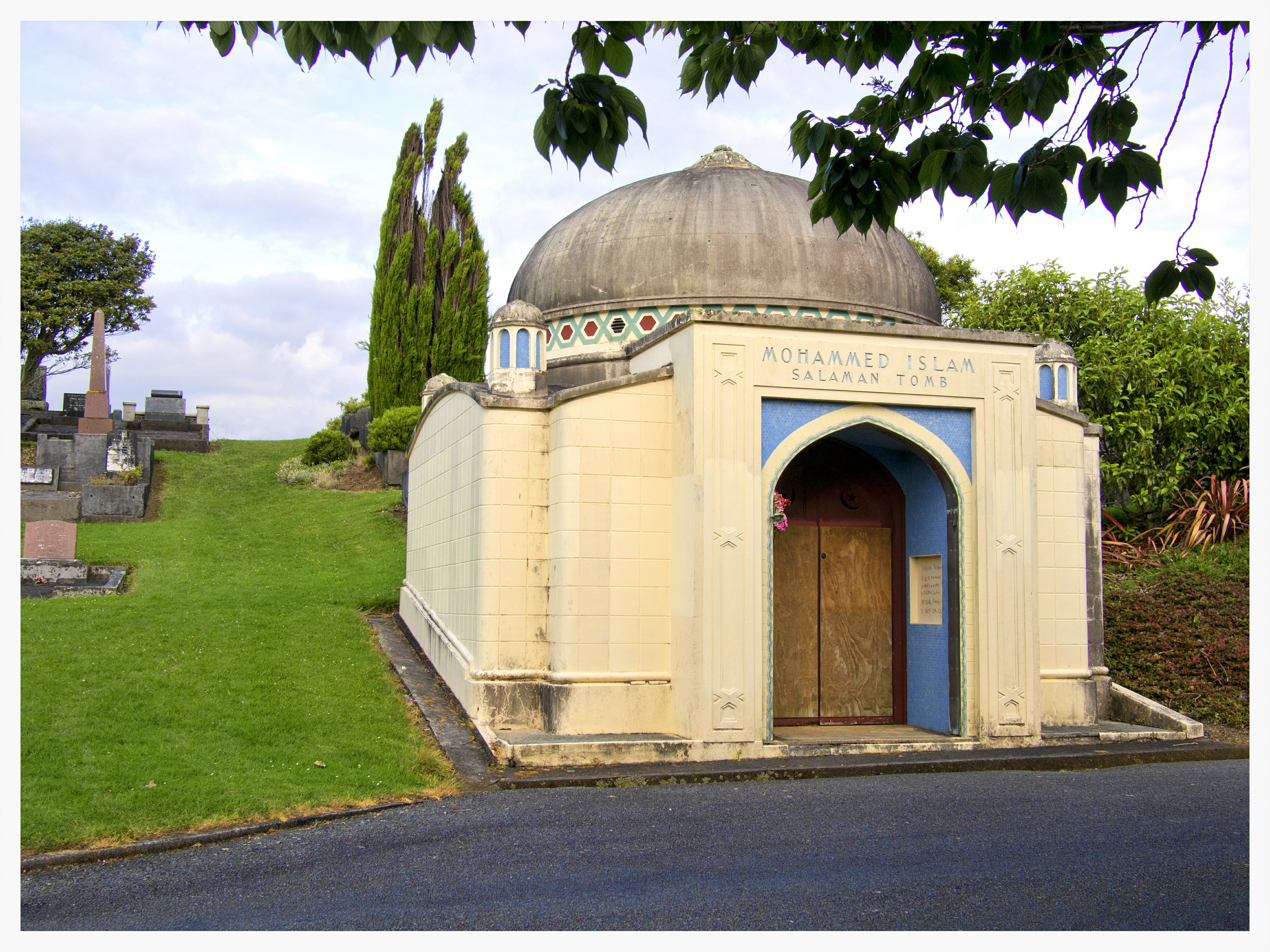
Salaman tomb

Abraham Walley Mahomed Salaman (also spelt Mohamed; 1881-1886 – 8 February 1941) was a notable New Zealand merchant, dyer, herbalist and charlatan. He was born in Amritsar, to Muslim parents, in Punjab, British India in the 1880s.

In 1930 he was convicted of manslaughter after requiring that a diabetic patient of his be taken off insulin and subsequently died in a diabetic coma.

Salaman died in 1941 and is buried at Te Henui Cemetery in New Plymouth, where his tomb is one of the outstanding architectural features. Prior to his death, in 1940, Salaman designed his tomb in Islamic style and obtained special permission for it to occupy ten plots in Te Henui cemetery. The tomb cost £2,500 and was topped with a brass star and crescent moon, featuring the words ‘Mohammed Islam Salaman Tomb’ above the door.
