= Rangi Te Kanawa =

New Zealand textile conservator, museum professional and weaver

Rangi Te Kanawa MNZM
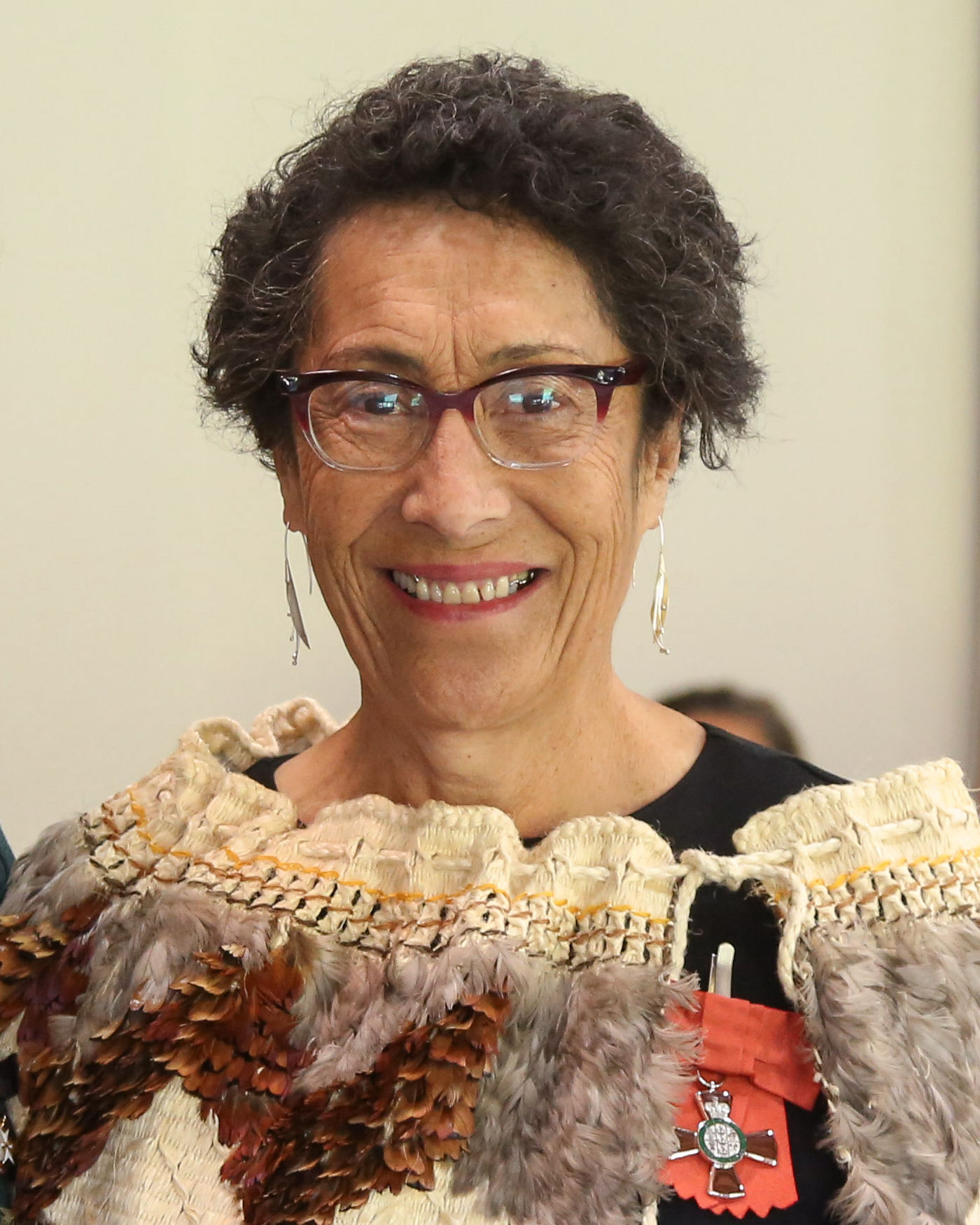
- Te Kanawa in 2024
- Born: Rangituatahi Te Kanawa
- Other name: Rangi Warnes
- Occupations: Museum professional, weaver
- Known for: Māori textile research and conservation
- Mother: Diggeress Te Kanawa
- Relatives: Rangimarie Hetet (grandmother); Charles Wilson Hursthouse (great-grandfather)

Rangituatahi Te Kanawa MNZM (married name Warnes) is a New Zealand textile conservator and weaver.

== Biography ==
Te Kanawa received a scholarship from the Department of Internal Affairs to train in conservation of textiles. The committee of the Aotearoa Moananui a Kiwa Weavers were keen for Māori to be involved in the conservation of Māori textile artefacts held by museums and other cultural institutions. Her introductory training on conservation of cultural material was in Canberra, after which she completed a year of pre-training at the conservation unit of the National Museum in Wellington. As a prerequisite of the three-year Conservation in Cultural Materials course at Canberra University, she also had to pass sixth-form chemistry, which she did through a Wellington secondary school. The degree was followed by a six-month internship at the Textile Conservation Centre, Hampton Court Palace, and time at the British Museum.

Te Kanawa works at the Museum of New Zealand Te Papa Tongarewa (Te Papa) and specialises in the conservation of and research about Māori textiles. She has been collaborating with a GNS forensic scientist on a project called the 'Whakapapa of Paru' to identify the provenance of cloaks in Te Papa's archives. Weaving by Te Kanawa has also been collected by Te Papa. Te Kanawa is a member of the New Zealand conservators of cultural materials association.

In the 2023 King's Birthday and Coronation Honours, Te Kanawa was appointed a Member of the New Zealand Order of Merit, for services to Māori art and heritage preservation.

== Family ==
Te Kanawa is the daughter of Diggeress Te Kanawa and the granddaughter of Dame Rangimarie Hetet. She is affiliated with the Ngāti Maniapoto iwi.

== Publications ==
- Blair, K. & Te Kanawa, R., The Conservation of Māori Textiles in Aotearoa New Zealand. Surface Design Journal, (2020) Vol. 44 No. 4, pp. 40–44
- Hartnup, K., Huynen, L., Te Kanawa, R., Shepherd, L.D., Millar, C.D., Lambert, D.M. & Ancient, DNA Recovers the Origins of Māori Feather Cloaks Molecular Biology and Evolution (October 2011) vol. 28 issue 10 pp. 2741–2750
- Te Kanawa, Rangituatahi (2021). Mana Taonga Kākahu: Exploring Approaches to Reconnecting Taonga Kākahu to Tangatawhenua (PhD thesis). Open Access Repository Victoria University of Wellington. doi:10.26686/wgtn.17204069.v2.
