= Rosalind Hursthouse =

New Zealand philosopher (born 1943)

Rosalind Hursthouse FRSNZ
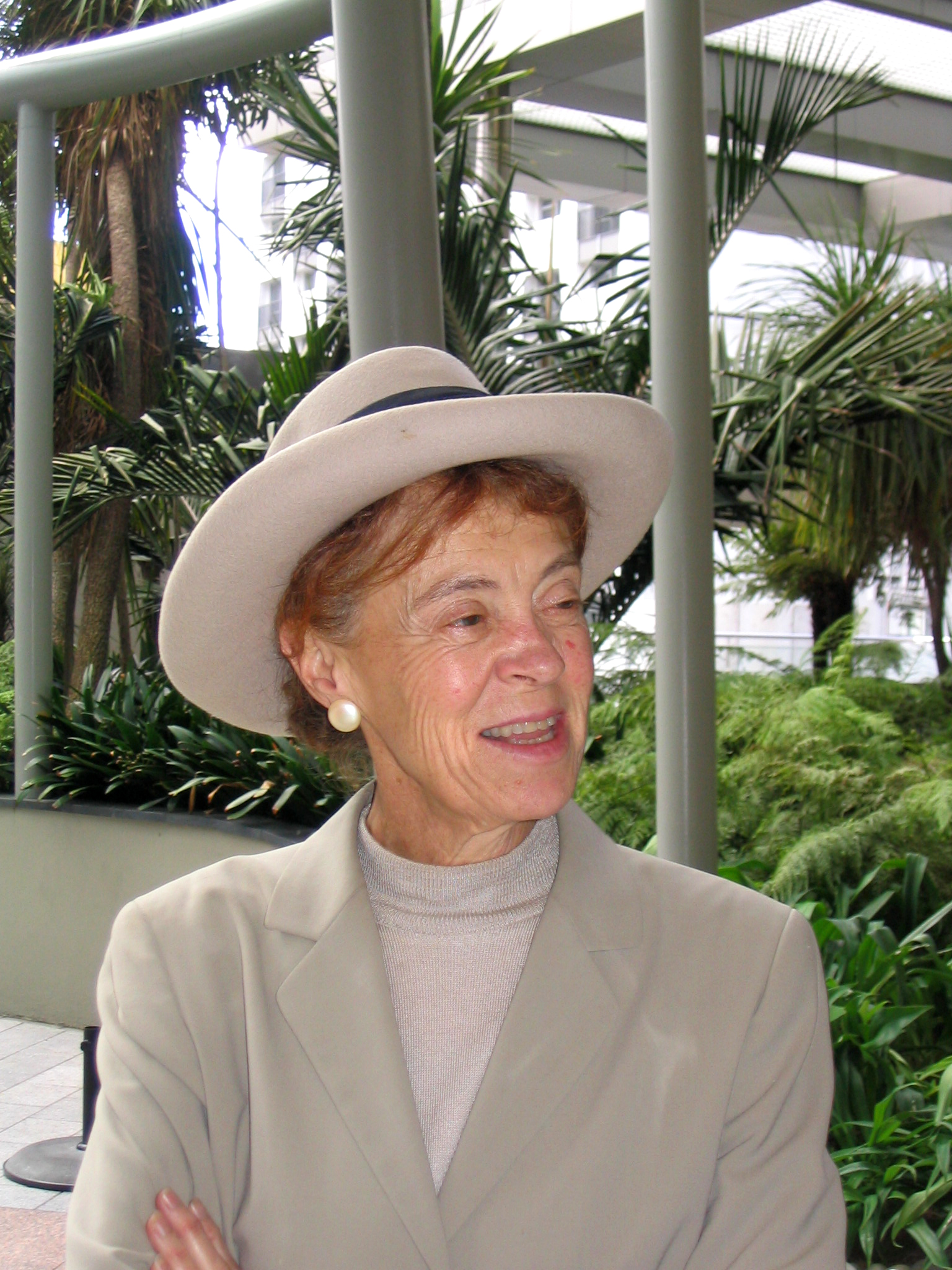
- Born: Mary Rosalind Hursthouse; 10 November 1943 (age 83); Bristol, England
- Awards: Fellow of the Royal Society of New Zealand

Education
- Education: Victoria University of Wellington; University of Auckland, BA, MA; Somerville College, Oxford, BPhil, DPhil
- Thesis: Action, Emotion and Motive

Philosophical work
- Era: Contemporary philosophy
- Region: Western philosophy
- School: Analytic philosophy, virtue ethics, Aristotelianism
- Institutions: University of Auckland; Open University; University of Oxford
- Main interests: Applied ethics, normative ethics, ancient philosophy, action theory
- Notable works: On Virtue Ethics
- Notable ideas: Neo-Aristotelianism, v-rules, Plato's requirement on the virtues
- Relatives: Richmond Hursthouse (great-grandfather); Charles Wilson Hursthouse (great-granduncle); Charles Flinders Hursthouse (great-great-granduncle)

Rosalind Hursthouse FRSNZ (born 10 November 1943) is a British-born New Zealand moral philosopher noted for her work on virtue ethics. She is one of the leading exponents of contemporary virtue ethics, though she has also written extensively on philosophy of action, history of philosophy, moral psychology, and biomedical ethics. Hursthouse is Professor Emerita of Philosophy at the University of Auckland and Fellow of the Royal Society of New Zealand.

Hursthouse's book On Virtue Ethics (1999) has been a seminal contribution to the contemporary revival of virtue theory ("aretaic turn") and is often cited as the definitive exposition of neo-Aristotelian virtue ethics, which links morally right action, virtuous character, and human flourishing. Her book has been described by Roger Crisp as "the comprehensive statement modern virtue ethics has been awaiting for forty years." According to Simon Blackburn, "With this book virtue ethics finally comes of age... This volume will effortlessly take its place as the defining exposition of the view." Hursthouse has also made significant contributions to current debates on moral status, ethical dilemmas, moral emotions, ethical naturalism, human nature, and practical wisdom.

Hursthouse was a student of Elizabeth Anscombe and Philippa Foot, from whom she draws inspiration for much of her work in virtue ethics. Indeed, many consider On Virtue Ethics to be the spiritual successor to Anscombe's 1958 article "Modern Moral Philosophy" as well as Foot's manuscript on ethical naturalism, which has since been published as Natural Goodness (2001).

== Early life and education ==
Rosalind Hursthouse (née Mary Rosalind) was born in Bristol, England on 10 November 1943 to William (Bill) Weldon Oliver Hursthouse (10 July 1914 – 19 April 2017) and Jessie (Jay) Hursthouse (née Jessie E. Simmonds) (19 May 1914 – 26 October 1987), but she and her younger brother, William, grew up in Wellington, New Zealand. She is a member of the notable Atkinson–Hursthouse–Richmond family of New Zealand and a descendant of the Hursthouse family of England, which traces back to the first John Hursthouse who immigrated from Holland in the 1600s.

As a 17-year-old, Hursthouse was inspired to study philosophy by her aunt, Mary Fearon Hursthouse, after an argument at the dinner table. She enrolled the next year at Victoria University of Wellington and then transferred to the University of Auckland, where she earned her BA (1964) and MA (1965) in Philosophy and was subsequently appointed as Junior Lecturer in Philosophy.

In 1966, Hursthouse (as Rosalind Mary Hursthouse) went up to the University of Oxford to read for the BPhil (1968) on a postgraduate scholarship, going on to read for the DPhil (1974) at Somerville College while working as Stipendiary Lecturer in Philosophy at Corpus Christi College, making her the first woman to teach at an all men's college in Oxford. While at Somerville, Hursthouse was mentored by Elizabeth Anscombe and Philippa Foot, both of whom would become for her lifelong friends and sources of philosophical inspiration.

== Career ==
After teaching at the University of Auckland and Corpus Christi College, Hursthouse joined the ranks of the founding faculty of the Open University to work with disadvantaged students and adult learners who had little to no background in philosophy. In 1975, she was appointed as lecturer at the Open University, where she remained for the next 25 years, eventually as Senior Lecturer and as Head of Department (1991–1997). By 1991, Hursthouse had "burst upon the international philosophical scene for the first time" with the following three articles:

1. "Arational Actions", which made a break with the view that the explanation of action by reference to reasons (an "intention") is also a species of event-causal explanation in the sense familiar from the work of Donald Davidson. By showing that some bona fide intentional actions are explained arationally, Hursthouse argues, by counterexample, that Davidson's account of reasons as causes of action is mistaken. Hursthouse turns her philosophical attention, and ours, to the kinds of reasons asked for and given by human beings in the explanation of human behaviour: the behaviour of emotional, rational, social, political, linguistic, lawful animals.
2. "Virtue Theory and Abortion", in which Hursthouse outlined the structure of a new version of Aristotelian virtue ethics, defended it against possible objections and applied it to the issue of abortion. She argues that whereas most discussions of abortion focus on the issue of who has rights to make decisions regarding the foetus, a decision made within one's rights could still be callous or cowardly, meaning that it would be ethically problematic and potentially devastating for the person making it, whatever the status of the foetus and the reproductive rights of women. The paper, which combines theory and application, was an early exemplar of Hursthouse's distinctive approach to philosophical ethics. Hursthouse demonstrates the emphasis in neo-Aristotelian virtue ethics on the lives of situated human agents (including the consequences of their actions), and the salient capabilities, character traits, and reasons involved in truly acting well, or as well as possible, within whatever situation an agent may find herself.
3. "After Hume's Justice", which offered a neo-Aristotelian account of social justice that was deeply influenced by Ludwig Wittgenstein. Hursthouse argues that a modern political philosophy that prioritises the good — virtue and human flourishing — over the right, and takes ethics to be prior to, and continuous with, politics, can nevertheless accommodate individual human rights.

While Hursthouse has applied virtue ethics to practical issues in Beginning Lives and Ethics, Humans, and Other Animals, her most important contribution to philosophy is On Virtue Ethics. In the first section, she shows how neo-Aristotelian virtue ethics provides action guidance and illuminates ethical dilemmas. In the second section, Hursthouse offers the first virtue-based account of acting "from a sense of duty," bringing out the significance of moral emotions. In the third and final section, she considers the question, "Which character traits are the virtues?" This is the most controversial and widely discussed part of her book. Hursthouse's answer is that the virtues are the character traits which tend to not only benefit their possessor but also, relatedly, make their possessor a good human being — based, in part, on quasi-scientific "ethical but non‐evaluative beliefs about human nature and how human life goes" ("Plato's Requirement on the Virtues"). At the end of her book, Hursthouse says, "Atheists may find it hard to recognise the point nowadays, but believing that human nature is harmonious is part of the virtue of hope. Something at least very like it used to be called belief in (God's) Providence; to believe in Providence was part of the virtue of hope; to doubt it is to fall prey to the vice of despair. And that seems to me to be right." Despite this, she is an atheist.

Since writing On Virtue Ethics, Hursthouse has held visiting positions at the University of California, Los Angeles, the University of California, San Diego, the University of Auckland, the University of North Carolina, Chapel Hill, Stanford University, and the University of California, Berkeley (Mills Distinguished Visiting professor in Moral and Intellectual Philosophy and Civil Polity). In 2002, Hursthouse accepted an appointment as Professor of Philosophy at the University of Auckland (serving as Head of department until 2005) in order to return home to New Zealand and be with her aging father. In 2016, she was elected as Fellow of the Royal Society of New Zealand and retired from her academic career at the University of Auckland, where she is now Professor Emerita of Philosophy.

== Bibliography ==
- 'The Central Doctrine of the Mean' in The Blackwell Guide to Aristotle’s Nicomachean Ethics, ed. Richard Kraut, Blackwell, 2006, pp. 96–115.
- 'Are Virtues the Proper Starting Point for Ethical Theory?' in Contemporary Debates in Moral Theory, ed. James Dreier, Blackwell, 2006, pp. 99–112.
- ‘Virtue Ethics’ Stanford Encyclopedia of Philosophy Online, 2003
- 'Virtue Ethics vs Rule-Consequentialism: A Reply to Brad Hooker', Utilitas Vol 14, March 2002 pp 41–53.
- Ethics, Humans and Other Animals, Routledge, 2000 (written as a part of an Open University course).
- On Virtue Ethics, Oxford University Press, 1999. For the author's account of how this book came to be written, go to OUP site
- 'Virtue and Human Nature' in Hume Studies double issue, November 1999/February 2000.
- 'Intention' in Logic, Cause and Action, ed. Roger Teichmann, Cambridge University Press, 2000.
- 'Virtue Ethics and the Emotions' in Virtue Ethics, ed. Daniel Statman, Edinburgh University Press, 1997.
- 'Hume's Moral and Political Philosophy' in History of Philosophy, Vol. 5, British Philosophy and the Enlightenment, ed. Stuart Brown, Routledge, 1996.
- 'The Virtuous Agent's Reasons: a reply to Bernard Williams' in the Proceedings of the Keeling Colloquium on Aristotle on Moral Realism, ed. Robert Heinaman, UCL Press, 1995.
- 'Normative Virtue Ethics' in How Should One Live? ed. Roger Crisp, OUP, 1995.
- 'Applying Virtue Ethics' in Virtues and Reasons, Festschrift for Philippa Foot, eds. Rosalind Hursthouse, Gavin Lawrence, Warren Quinn, OUP, 1995.
- 'Arational Actions' in The Journal of Philosophy, Vol. LXXXVIII 1991.
- 'Virtue Theory and Abortion' in Philosophy and Public Affairs, Vol. 20, 1990–91.
- 'After Hume's Justice' in Proceedings of the Aristotelian Society, Vol. XCL, 1990/91.
