= Otorohanga railway station =

Railway station in New Zealand

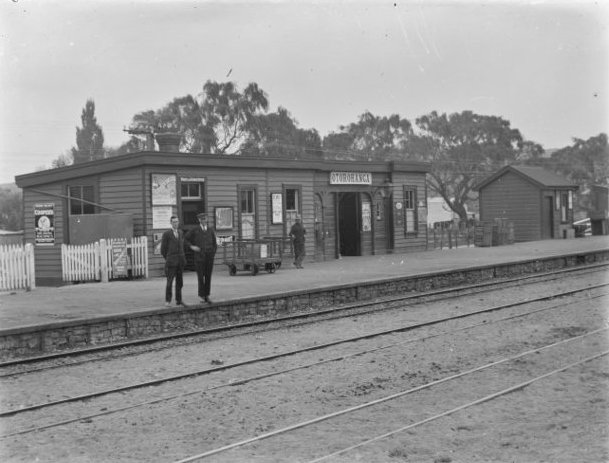
- Otorohanga railway station in 1921; Godber, Albert Percy, 1875–1949 -Collection of albums, prints and negatives. Ref- APG-0815-1-2-G. Alexander Turnbull Library, Wellington.

General information
- Location: New Zealand
- Coordinates: 38.1867°S 175.2123°E
- Elevation: 37 m (121 ft)
- Line: North Island Main Trunk
- Distance: Wellington 494.41 km (307.21 mi)

History
- Opened: 9 March 1887
- Closed: 2012
- Electrified: 24 June 1988

Services
Preceding station	Great Journeys New Zealand	Following station
Hamilton towards Auckland Strand	Northern Explorer	Taumarunui towards Wellington

Other services
Preceding station	Historical railways	Following station
Kiokio; Line open, station closed 4.45 km (2.77 mi)	North Island Main Trunk; KiwiRail	Hangatiki; Line open, station closed 5.72 km (3.55 mi)

Heritage New Zealand – Category 2
- Designated: 5 September 1985
- Reference no.: 4263
Location

Otorohanga railway station serves the town of Ōtorohanga, on the North Island Main Trunk in New Zealand. The current station dates from 1924.

Trains calling at Ōtorohanga included The Overlander, Blue Streak, Scenic Daylight, Daylight Limited, Northerner, Northern Explorer, and Night Limited. By 2012, passenger numbers had dropped to an average of two per train, which brought about a brief closure from 24 June. Initially the reinstatement was for summer only from 10 December. Scheduled services to Otorohanga were suspended from December 2021 to 25 September 2022. Currently passengers need to pre-book services to and from the station

== History ==
Surveying to extend the railway 14 mi 20 ch (22.9 km) from Te Awamutu to Ōtorohanga was started in 1883 by Charles Wilson Hursthouse. The first sod ceremony was performed at the Puniu River on 15 April 1885. Trains were working through to Ōtorohanga by January 1887, and the extension opened on 6, or 8 March 1887, though the line wasn't handed over from the Public Works Department to the Railways Department (NZR) until Wednesday 9 March. Initially trains only ran on Tuesdays and Thursdays.

Coates & Metcalfe were the contractors for the 11 mi 41 ch (18.5 km) extension of the NIMT, from Ōtorohanga to Te Kuiti. Until August 1887, the contractors provided goods trains on the extension. By October 1887 goods trains ran on Mondays and Fridays. NZR took over from the contractors, adding a passenger service on those days from Friday 2 December 1887.

By April 1887, there was a 4th class station building and by 1896 a platform, cart approach, 40 ft (12 m) x 30 ft (9.1 m) goods shed, loading bank, cattle yards, urinals and a passing loop for 31 wagons. There was a Post Office at the station from 1893 to 1908. In 1910 a station on the town side of the line replaced the old station and the goods shed was moved near the old station site. A stationmaster's house was added in 1912 and a crane in 1913. On 17 December 1923 the station burnt down. The current station opened in 1924. Electric light was added in 1927. Three railway houses were added in 1953. In 1980 there was a station building, platform, goods shed, gantry, stockyards and a loop for 81 wagons. The station was given a New Zealand Historic Places Trust Category 2 listing in 1985.

== Services ==
The station on Wahanui Crescent is managed by KiwiRail who operate the Northern Explorer three times a week in each direction between Wellington and The Strand. Hamilton is 48.11 km (29.89 mi) to the north, timetabled in 2015, departure to departure, in 39 minutes, and National Park, 147.58 km (91.70 mi) to the south, in 139 minutes, both southbound. Scheduled passenger services were suspended in December 2021. Then reinstated later in 2022.

== Rangitoto Colliery Co. branch ==
In 1890 Ellis & Burnand had sought tenders for a tramway to bring timber to their mill and it was mentioned as flooded in 1892. The 1919 Railways Authorisation Bill included a, "branch line from Otorohanga, along right bank of the Waipa River, to the south boundary of Block VI, Mangaoronga survey district. Length about 7½ miles." The Railway Atlas indicates the line was horse worked, served the Ellis and Burnand Mill (open 1889–1912), as well as the colliery, and existed by 1921. The 1921 photograph (below) appears to show a horse worked tramway, but only remnants of the line appear in the 1947 photos.

The mine closed in 1937, after 11 years of working, "as the coal was of inferior quality and the expenses of mining and marketing the output were unduly high." However, a 1944 Parliamentary report indicates that production recommenced, but a road was built, rather than using the tramway. The report said, "Rangitoto Opencast.—Stripping of this area, adjacent to the old Rangitoto Colliery, some eight miles from Otorohanga, commenced, in July. An access road was also constructed. Coal-production started in September, Output for 1944 was 1,797 tons."

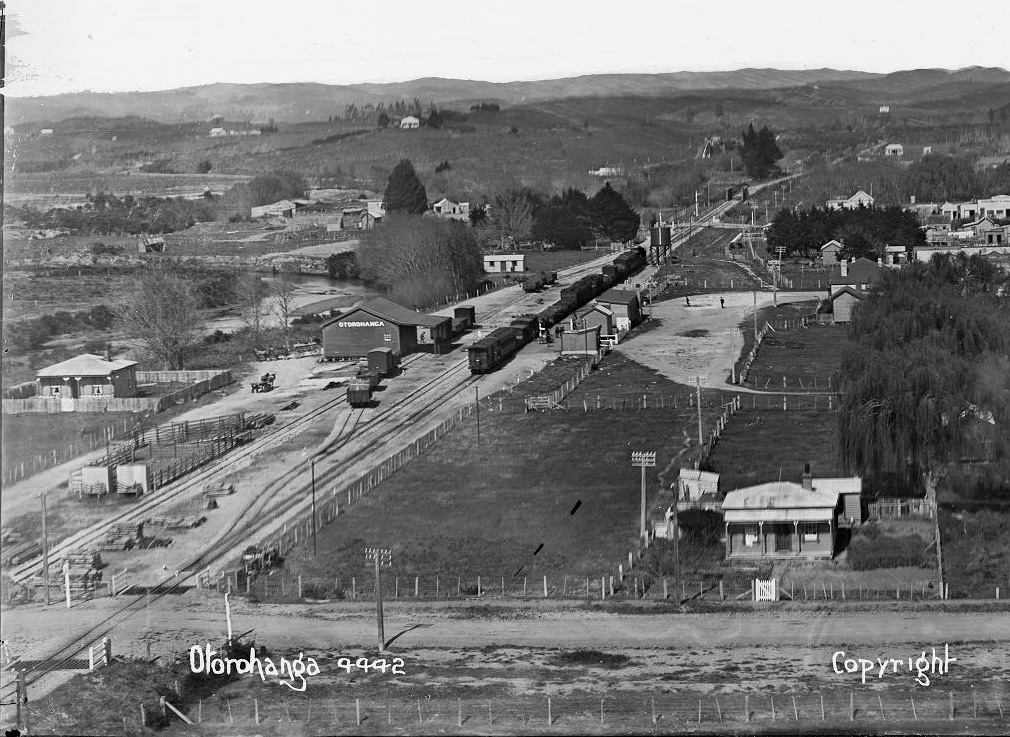
Circa 1910

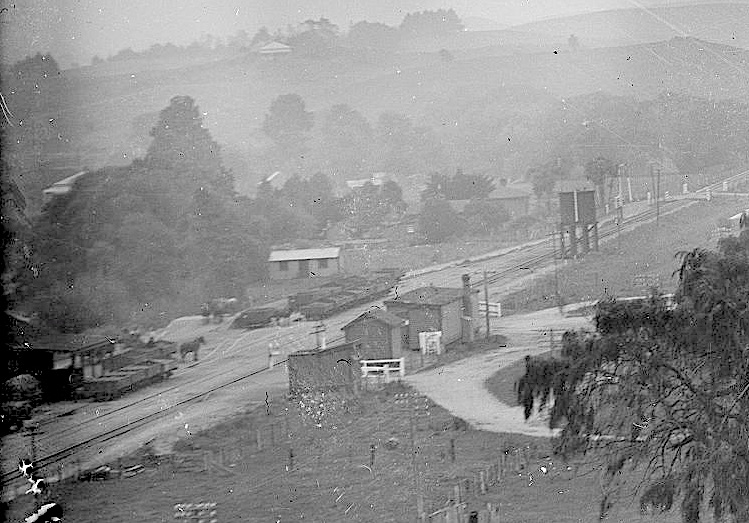
Circa 1921

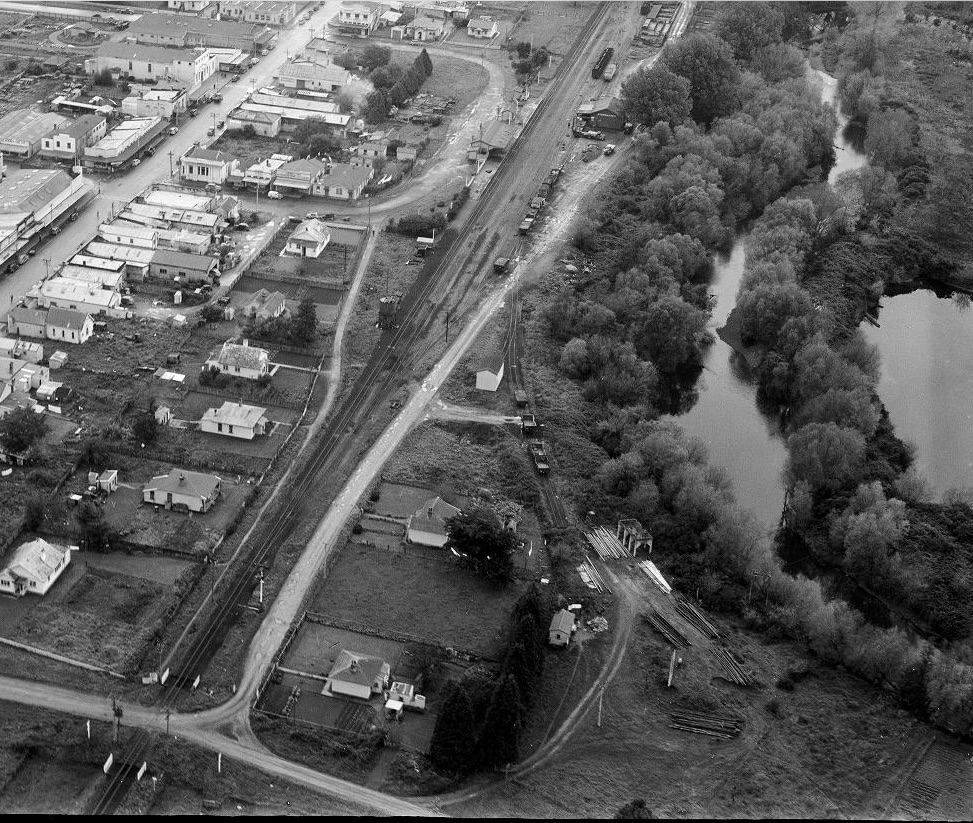
April 1947

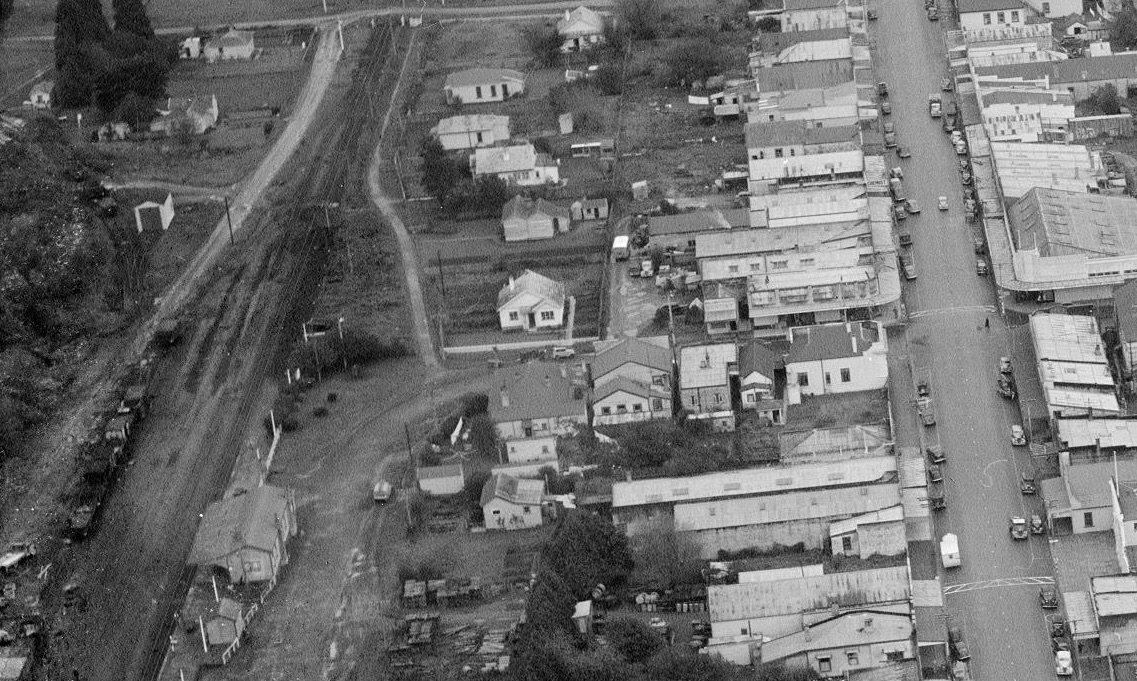
May 1947

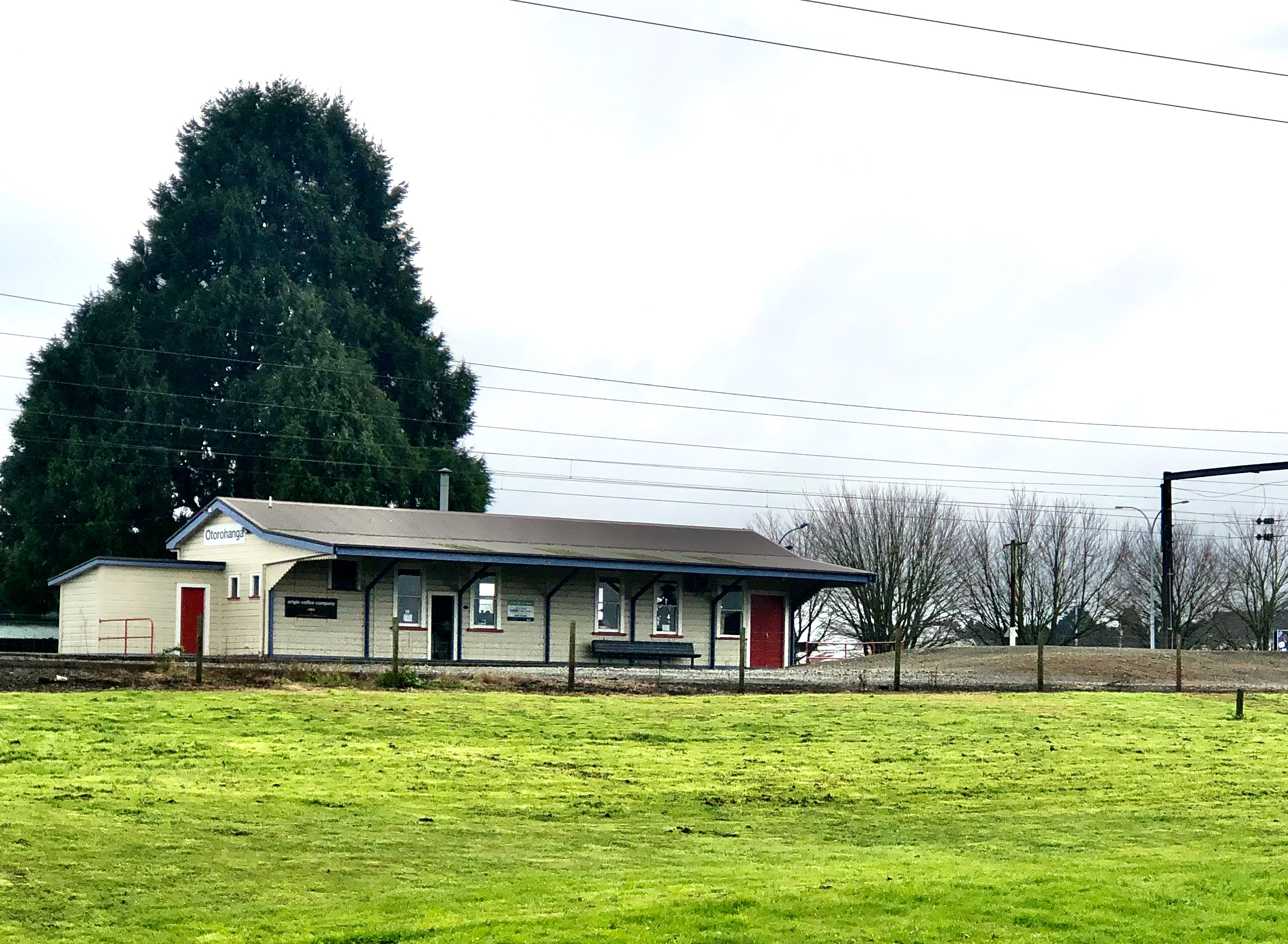
Otorohanga railway station 2021

== Waipā bridge ==
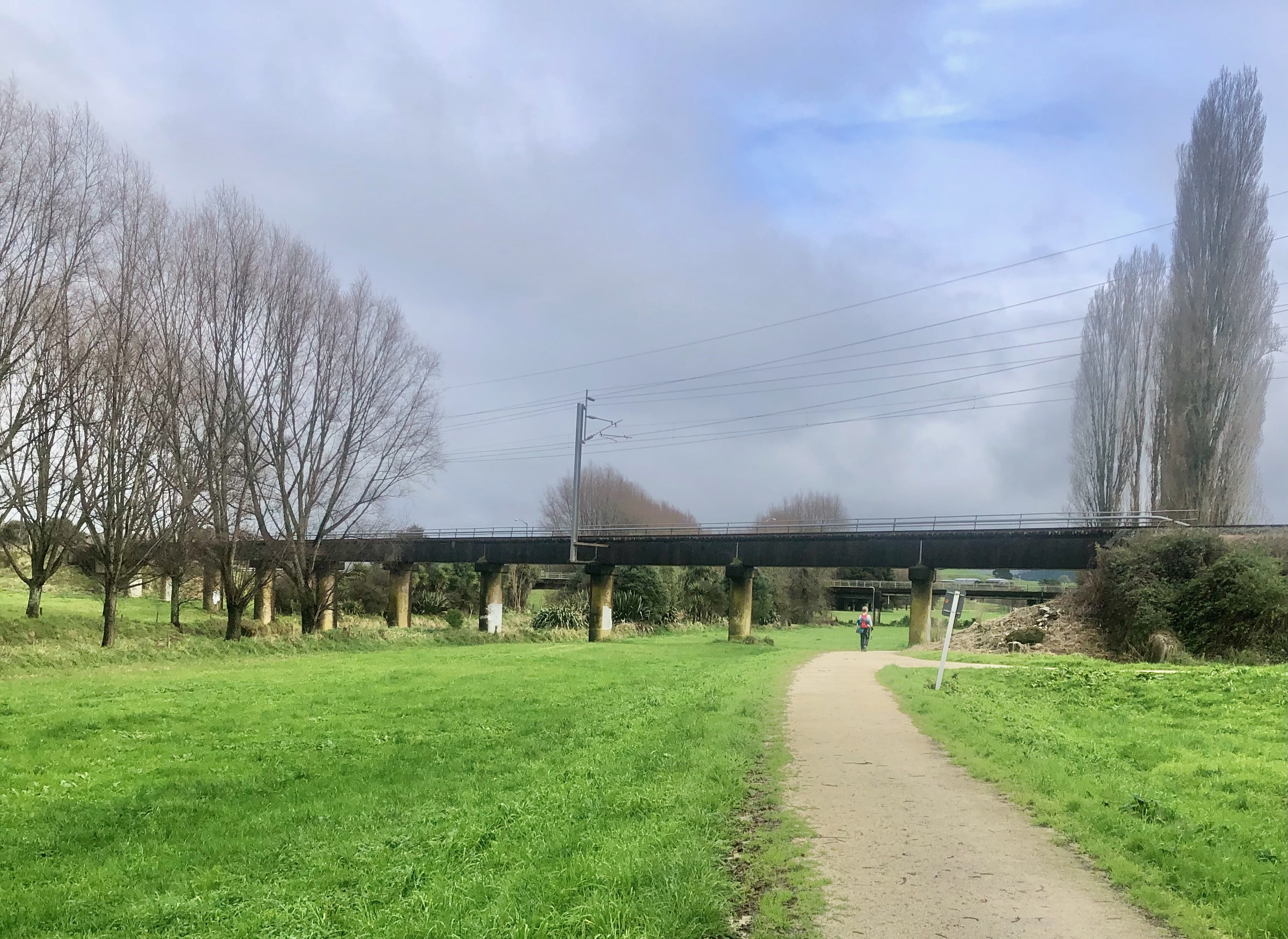
Ōtorohanga rail bridge in 2021

To the south of the station bridge 232 crosses the Waipā River. The original bridge, built in 1887, was closer to the station than its replacement opened on 23 May 1965. The bridge is 440 ft (130 m) long, on 40 ft (12 m) reinforced concrete spans, supported by reinforced concrete piers on prestressed concrete piles.

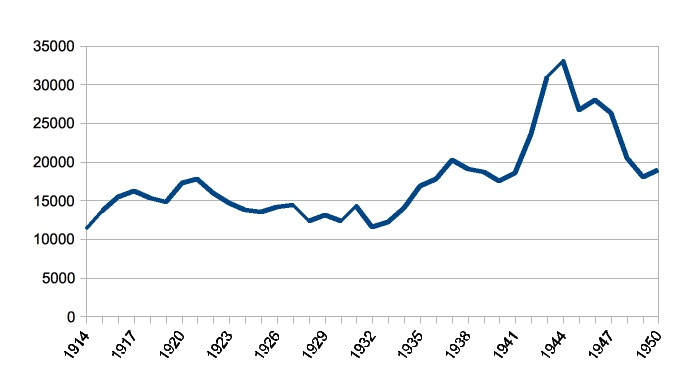
tickets sales 1913–1950 – derived from annual returns to Parliament of "Statement of Revenue for each Station for the Year ended"

== Patronage ==
As shown in the table and graph below, passenger numbers peaked during World War 2.

year	tickets	season tickets	staff	source	title
1913	12,306	14	5	https://paperspast.natlib.govt.nz/parliamentary/appendix-to-the-journals-of-the-house-of-representatives/1913/I/3693	RETURN No. 12. STATEMENT of Revenue and Expenditure of each Station for the Year ended 31 March 1913
1914	11,263	35		https://paperspast.natlib.govt.nz/parliamentary/appendix-to-the-journals-of-the-house-of-representatives/1914/I/2031	RETURN No. 12. Statement of Revenue for each Station for the Year ended 31 March 1914
1915	13,672	23		https://paperspast.natlib.govt.nz/parliamentary/appendix-to-the-journals-of-the-house-of-representatives/1915/I/1638	RETURN No. 12. Statement of Revenue for each Station for the Year ended 31 March 1915
1916	15,435	42		https://paperspast.natlib.govt.nz/parliamentary/appendix-to-the-journals-of-the-house-of-representatives/1916/I/1053	RETURN No. 12. Statement of Revenue for each Station for the Year ended 31 March 1916
1917	16,142	93		https://paperspast.natlib.govt.nz/parliamentary/appendix-to-the-journals-of-the-house-of-representatives/1917/I/1123	RETURN No. 12. Statement of Revenue for each Station for the Year ended 31 March 1917
1918	15,343	166		https://paperspast.natlib.govt.nz/parliamentary/appendix-to-the-journals-of-the-house-of-representatives/1918/I-II/1159	RETURN No. 12. Statement of Revenue for each Station for the Year ended 31 March 1918
1919	14,754	117		https://paperspast.natlib.govt.nz/parliamentary/appendix-to-the-journals-of-the-house-of-representatives/1919/I/1231	RETURN No. 12. Statement of Revenue for each Station for the Year ended 31 March 1919
1920	17,188	251		https://paperspast.natlib.govt.nz/parliamentary/appendix-to-the-journals-of-the-house-of-representatives/1920/I/1349	RETURN No. 12. Statement of Revenue for each Station for the Year ended 31 March 1920
1921	17,787	164		https://paperspast.natlib.govt.nz/parliamentary/appendix-to-the-journals-of-the-house-of-representatives/1921/I-II/1452	RETURN No. 12. Statement of Revenue for each Station for the Year ended 31 March 1921
1922	15,901	129		https://paperspast.natlib.govt.nz/parliamentary/appendix-to-the-journals-of-the-house-of-representatives/1922/I/1409	RETURN No. 12. Statement of Revenue for each Station for the Year ended 31 March 1922
1923	14,675	280		https://paperspast.natlib.govt.nz/parliamentary/appendix-to-the-journals-of-the-house-of-representatives/1923/I-II/1321	RETURN No. 12. Statement of Revenue for each Station for the Year ended 31 March 1923
1924	13,689	270		https://paperspast.natlib.govt.nz/parliamentary/appendix-to-the-journals-of-the-house-of-representatives/1924/I/2458	RETURN No. 12. Statement of Revenue for each Station for the Year ended 31 March 1924
1925	13,513	246		https://paperspast.natlib.govt.nz/parliamentary/appendix-to-the-journals-of-the-house-of-representatives/1925/I/1804	RETURN No. 12. Statement of Traffic and Revenue for each Station for the Year ended 31 March 1925
1926	14,094	304		https://paperspast.natlib.govt.nz/parliamentary/appendix-to-the-journals-of-the-house-of-representatives/1926/I/1930	STATEMENT No. 18 Statement of Traffic and Revenue for each Station for the Year ended 31 March 1926
1927	14,411	95		https://paperspast.natlib.govt.nz/parliamentary/appendix-to-the-journals-of-the-house-of-representatives/1927/I/2230	STATEMENT No. 18 Statement of Traffic and Revenue for each Station for the Year ended 31 March 1927
1928	12,345	86		https://paperspast.natlib.govt.nz/parliamentary/appendix-to-the-journals-of-the-house-of-representatives/1928/I/2628	STATEMENT No. 18 Statement of Traffic and Revenue for each Station for the Year ended 31 March 1928
1929	13,077	52		https://paperspast.natlib.govt.nz/parliamentary/appendix-to-the-journals-of-the-house-of-representatives/1929/I/2090	STATEMENT No. 18 Statement of Traffic and Revenue for each Station for the Year ended 31 March 1929
1930	12,261	22		https://paperspast.natlib.govt.nz/parliamentary/appendix-to-the-journals-of-the-house-of-representatives/1930/I/2212	STATEMENT No. 18 Statement of Traffic and Revenue for each Station for the Year ended 31 March 1930
1931	14,216	45		https://paperspast.natlib.govt.nz/parliamentary/appendix-to-the-journals-of-the-house-of-representatives/1931/I-II/1778	STATEMENT No. 18 Statement of Traffic and Revenue for each Station for the Year ended 31 March 1931
1932	11,511	57		https://paperspast.natlib.govt.nz/parliamentary/appendix-to-the-journals-of-the-house-of-representatives/1932/I-II/1934	STATEMENT No. 18 Statement of Traffic and Revenue for each Station for the Year ended 31 March 1932
1933	12,144	52		https://paperspast.natlib.govt.nz/parliamentary/appendix-to-the-journals-of-the-house-of-representatives/1933/I/1388	STATEMENT No. 18 Statement of Traffic and Revenue for each Station for the Year ended 31 March 1933
1934	14,055	43		https://paperspast.natlib.govt.nz/parliamentary/appendix-to-the-journals-of-the-house-of-representatives/1934/I/2278	STATEMENT No. 18 Statement of Traffic and Revenue for each Station for the Year ended 31 March 1934
1935	16,795	17		https://paperspast.natlib.govt.nz/parliamentary/appendix-to-the-journals-of-the-house-of-representatives/1935/I/1326	STATEMENT No. 18 Statement of Traffic and Revenue for each Station for the Year ended 31 March 1935
1936	17,704	25		https://paperspast.natlib.govt.nz/parliamentary/appendix-to-the-journals-of-the-house-of-representatives/1936/I/1552	STATEMENT No. 18 Statement of Traffic and Revenue for each Station for the Year ended 31 March 1936
1937	20,150	26		https://paperspast.natlib.govt.nz/parliamentary/appendix-to-the-journals-of-the-house-of-representatives/1937/I/1896	STATEMENT No. 18 Statement of Traffic and Revenue for each Station for the Year ended 31 March 1937
1938	19,043	16		https://paperspast.natlib.govt.nz/parliamentary/appendix-to-the-journals-of-the-house-of-representatives/1938/I/1652	STATEMENT No. 18 Statement of Traffic and Revenue for each Station for the Year ended 31 March 1938
1939	18,626	24		https://paperspast.natlib.govt.nz/parliamentary/appendix-to-the-journals-of-the-house-of-representatives/1939/I/1970	STATEMENT No. 18 Statement of Traffic and Revenue for each Station for the Year ended 31 March 1939
1940	17,433	34		https://paperspast.natlib.govt.nz/parliamentary/appendix-to-the-journals-of-the-house-of-representatives/1940/I/1314	STATEMENT No. 18 Statement of Traffic and Revenue for each Station for the Year ended 31 March 1940
1941	18,479	55		https://paperspast.natlib.govt.nz/parliamentary/appendix-to-the-journals-of-the-house-of-representatives/1941/I/1203	STATEMENT No. 18 Statement of Traffic and Revenue for each Station for the Year ended 31 March 1941
1942	23,566	67		https://paperspast.natlib.govt.nz/parliamentary/appendix-to-the-journals-of-the-house-of-representatives/1942/I/651	STATEMENT No. 18 Statement of Traffic and Revenue for each Station for the Year ended 31 March 1942
1943	30,897	95		https://paperspast.natlib.govt.nz/parliamentary/appendix-to-the-journals-of-the-house-of-representatives/1943/I/679	STATEMENT No. 18 Statement of Traffic and Revenue for each Station for the Year ended 31 March 1943
1944	32,974	82		https://paperspast.natlib.govt.nz/parliamentary/appendix-to-the-journals-of-the-house-of-representatives/1944/I/895	STATEMENT No. 18 Statement of Traffic and Revenue for each Station for the Year ended 31 March 1944
1945	26,634	63		https://paperspast.natlib.govt.nz/parliamentary/appendix-to-the-journals-of-the-house-of-representatives/1945/I/969	STATEMENT No. 18 Statement of Traffic and Revenue for each Station for the Year ended 31 March 1945
1946	27,923	18		https://paperspast.natlib.govt.nz/parliamentary/appendix-to-the-journals-of-the-house-of-representatives/1946/I/1548	STATEMENT No. 18 Statement of Traffic and Revenue for each Station for the Year ended 31 March 1946
1947	26,305	13		https://paperspast.natlib.govt.nz/parliamentary/appendix-to-the-journals-of-the-house-of-representatives/1947/I/2495	STATEMENT No. 18 Statement of Traffic and Revenue for each Station for the Year ended 31 March 1947
1948	20,469	31		https://paperspast.natlib.govt.nz/parliamentary/appendix-to-the-journals-of-the-house-of-representatives/1948/I/2521	STATEMENT No. 18 Statement of Traffic and Revenue for each Station for the Year ended 31 March 1948
1949	18,071	9		https://paperspast.natlib.govt.nz/parliamentary/appendix-to-the-journals-of-the-house-of-representatives/1949/I/2104	STATEMENT No. 18 Statement of Traffic and Revenue for each Station for the Year ended 31 March 1949
1950	18,956	8		https://paperspast.natlib.govt.nz/parliamentary/appendix-to-the-journals-of-the-house-of-representatives/1950/I/2366	STATEMENT No. 18 Statement of Traffic and Revenue for each Station for the Year ended 31 March 1950
