= Jean Sandel =

New Zealand surgeon

- Born: 26 December 1916; Gisborne, New Zealand
- Died: 4 November 1974 (aged 57); New Plymouth, New Zealand
- Education: University of Otago
- Known for: first female New Zealand Fellow of the Royal College of Surgeons

Jean Mary Sandel (26 December 1916 – 4 November 1974) was a New Zealand surgeon, and the first New Zealand woman to be made a Fellow of the Royal College of Surgeons in 1947.

== Early life ==
Sandel was born in Gisborne, East Coast, New Zealand on 26 December 1916, though she grew up in Taumaranui. She attended New Plymouth Girls High School where she was head girl and dux in 1932 and 1933.

At the University of Otago medical school she won a number of prizes: the Senior Scholarship in Medicine 1936; the Scott Memorial Medal 1936; the Fowler Scholarship 1937; the A.F.J. Mickle prize 1938; the William Ledingham Christie Medal in applied anatomy 1938; the New Zealand Graduates’ Clinical Prize 1938. Her 5th year dissertation was on the health and living conditions of Māori in the King Country. She graduated MBChB in 1939.

== Career ==
On completing her degree Sandel worked as a surgeon at Wellington Hospital before going to London to do postgraduate training and work as a surgical registrar. In 1947 Sandel was the first New Zealand woman to become a Fellow of the Royal College of Surgeons. She returned to New Zealand in late 1949. In 1950 she took up a surgical position at New Plymouth Hospital where she became Director of Surgery in 1964. She was known for her technical ability in surgery and knowledge of surgical anatomy.

She was made a Fellow of the Royal Australasian College of Surgeons in 1957.

As well as her professional achievements she also encouraged other young women through the Federation of University Women. She also gardened and followed sports. She belonged to the Presbyterian church and left it bequests in her will.

Sandel never married and died in New Plymouth on 4 November 1974.

== Legacy ==
A number of places in New Plymouth are named after Sandel. A Sandel Memorial window at St Andrews Presbyterian Church in New Plymouth was dedicated in 1975 and a Jean Sandel Memorial Garden was created at the hospital beside the chapel. The Jean Sandel Retirement Village is named after her. A portrait of Sandel, painted by artist Craig Primrose, was unveiled at the retirement village in 2021.
