= Te Henui Cemetery =

Cemetery in New Plymouth, New Zealand

Coordinates: 39.057°S 174.092°E

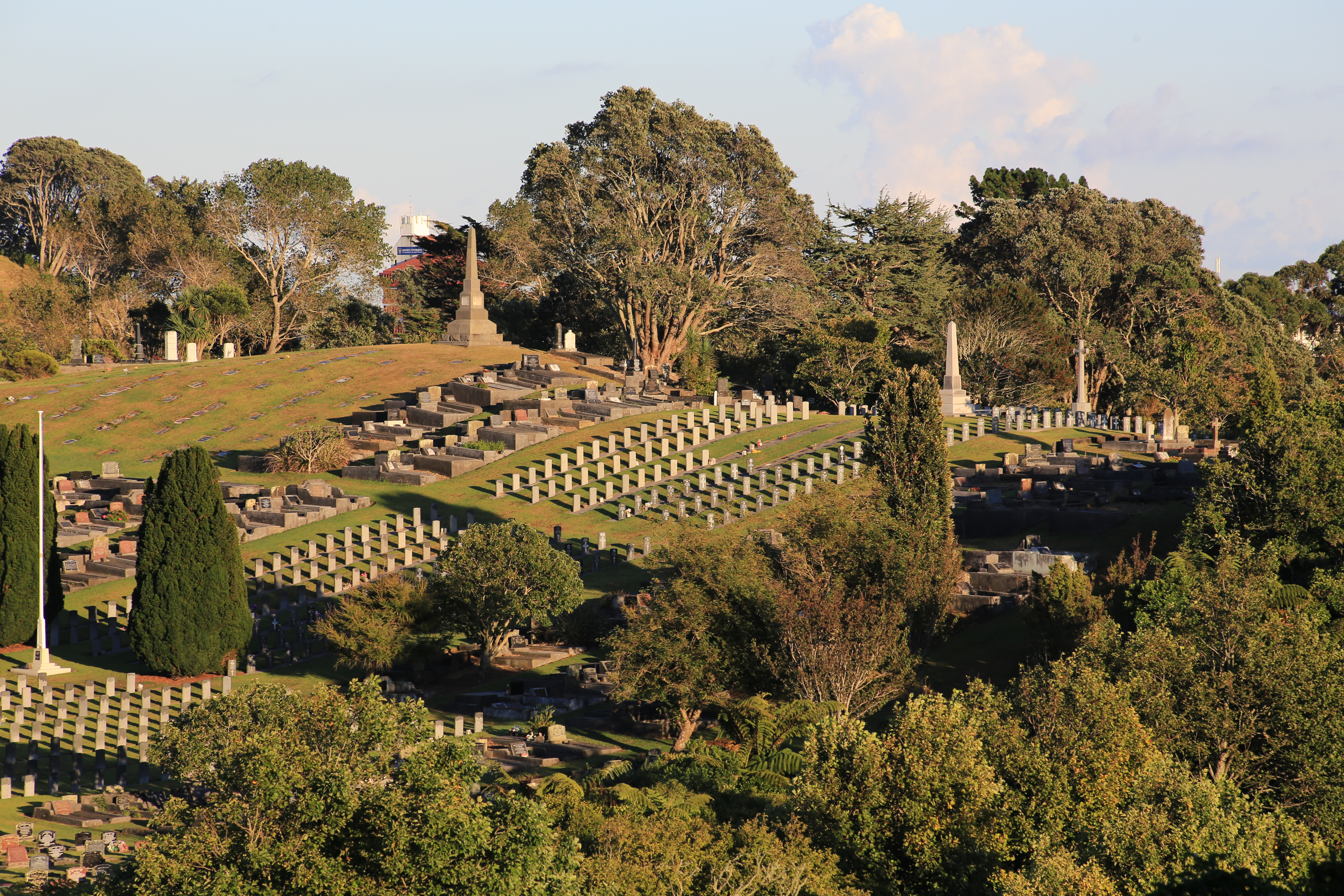
View of Te Henui Cemetery

Te Henui Cemetery, also known as New Plymouth Cemetery, is the oldest public cemetery in New Plymouth, New Zealand. It was first used in 1861.

The New Zealand Ministry for Culture and Heritage gives a translation of "the great mistake" for Te Hēnui.

== Description ==
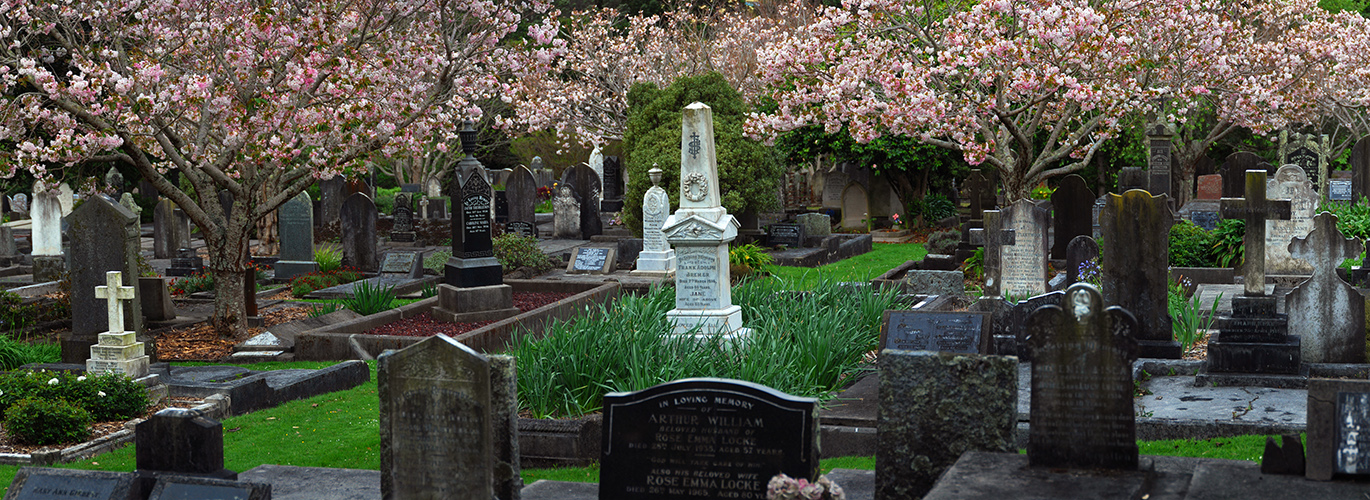
Blossoms in the Te Henui Cemetery

An ordinance by the Taranaki Provincial Council dated 28 October 1861 set aside 24 acres (9.7 ha) and established the first public burial ground in New Plymouth. The cemetery is the resting ground for the last eight victims of Tītokowaru's War. On 13 February 1869, a war party of Ngāti Maniapoto led by Wetere Te Rerenga killed all three men, a woman and three children, and also the Wesleyan missionary John Whiteley who arrived shortly afterwards, at the isolated Pukearuhe Redoubt, some 57 kilometres (35 mi) from New Plymouth. This was the final act of the Taranaki wars. There are two separate monuments at the cemetery that commemorate people who died in the incident.

With the abolition of provincial government in 1876, the cemetery came under the control of the New Plymouth Borough Council. Today, it is controlled by the New Plymouth District Council.

The main entrance to the cemetery is located at the intersection between Watson and Lemon Streets, where memorial gates were installed in 1924 on the request of Alice Honeyfield, a former resident then living in Sydney.

The cemetery contains the Commonwealth war graves of 12 men who served in the First World War, and 19 men who served in the Second World War.

Plots are no longer available for purchase, and the cemetery has mainly a heritage function. Occasional burials still occur on family plots.

== Notable burials ==
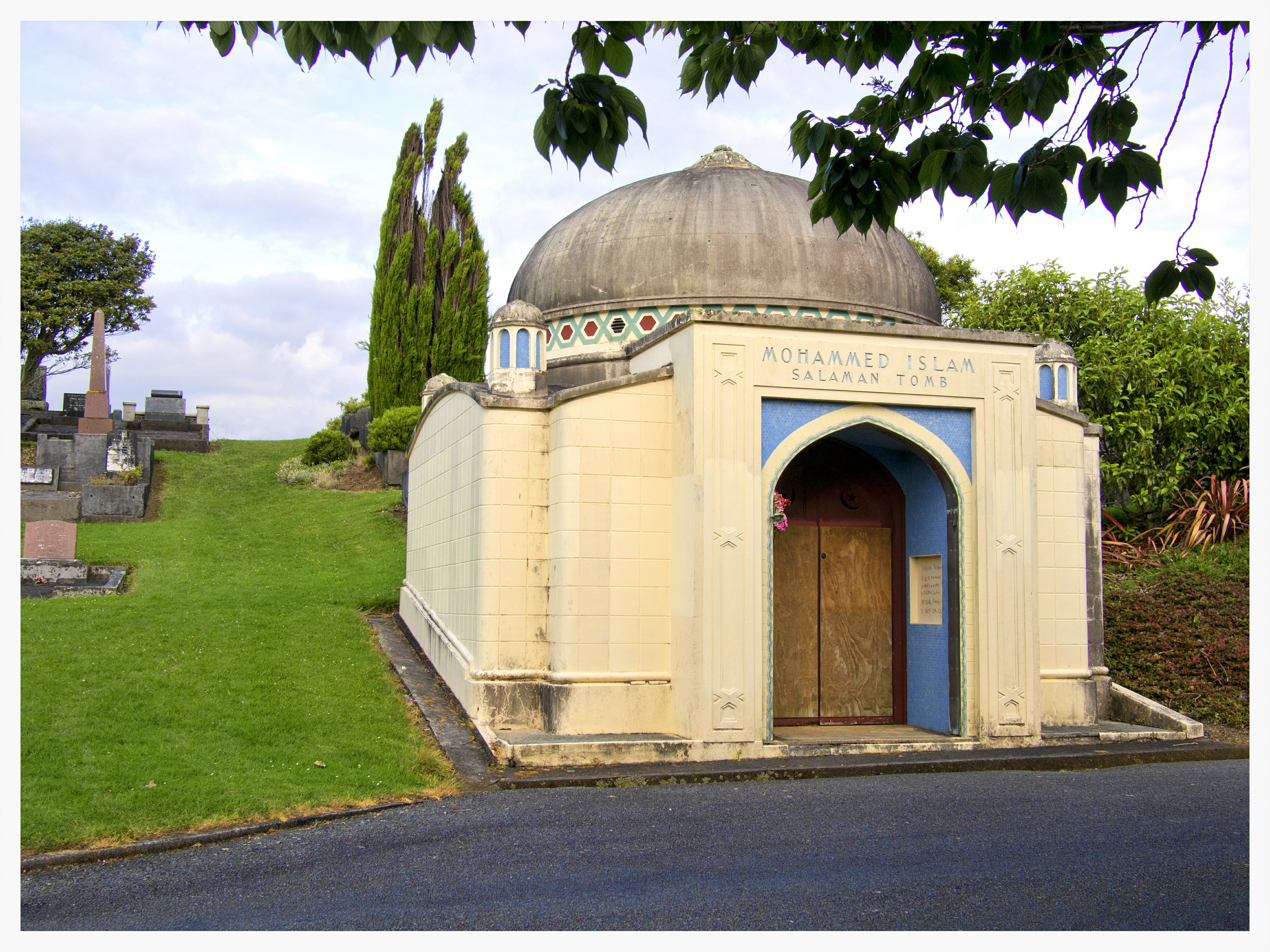
The Salaman tomb is one of the outstanding architectural features of the cemetery

- Frederic Carrington (1807–1901), local member of parliament, Taranaki Superintendent, and "Father of New Plymouth"
- Cyril Croker (1888–1958), solicitor and member of the Legislative Council
- Paddy George (1883–1950), representative rugby league player
- Monica Brewster (1886–1973), the lady behind the Govett-Brewster Art Gallery
- Leila Hurle (1901–1989), senior school inspector
- Thomas King (1821–1893), local member of parliament and one of the original settlers of New Plymouth
- Abraham Salaman (1885/1886?–1941), merchant, dyer, herbalist and charlatan
- William Skinner (1857–1946), surveyor, historian, and ethnographer
- Thomas S. Weston (1836–1912), judge and 19th-century member of parliament
- John Whiteley (1806–1869), Wesleyan missionary murdered at Pukearuhe
