= New Plymouth Girls' High School =

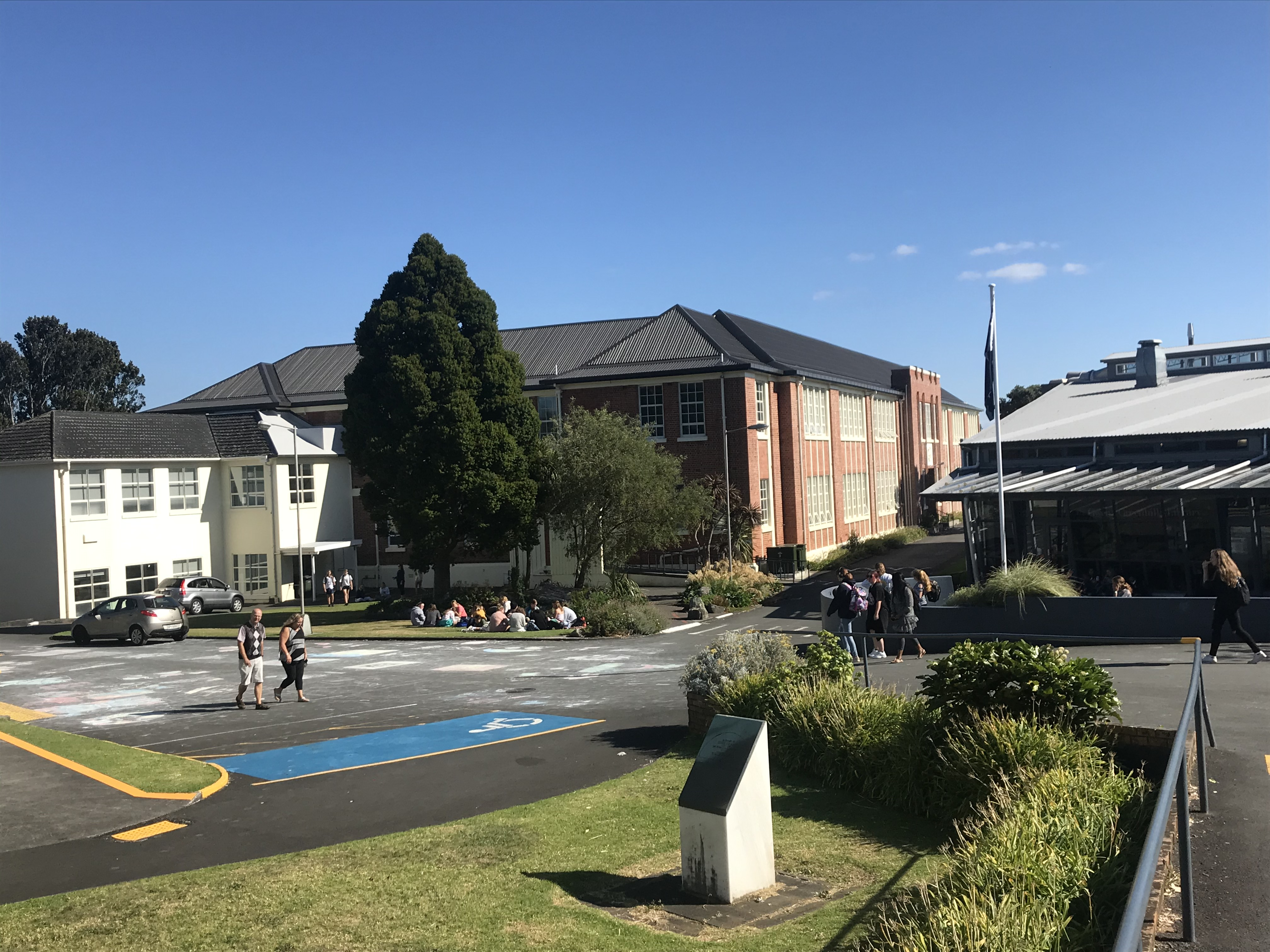

Location
- 60 Northgate, New Plymouth, New Zealand; 39.0559°S 174.0946°E

Information
- Type: State single sex girls' secondary (Year 9–13) with boarding facilities
- Motto: Et Comitate, Et Virtute, Et Sapientia (Friendship – Courage – Wisdom; Whakahoanga – Maia – Mātauranga)
- Established: 1914
- Ministry of Education Institution no.: 172
- Principal: Jacqui Brown
- Enrolment: 1,301 (July 2026)
- Socio-economic decile: 7O
- Website: npghs.school.nz

New Plymouth Girls' High School is a girls' state secondary school in Strandon, New Plymouth, New Zealand. The school separated from New Plymouth High School in 1914, leaving New Plymouth Boys' High School on the old site.

It is currently one of two of New Plymouth's girls' schools along with Sacred Heart Girls' College and has a current roll of 1,301 students.

Students are put into four houses for school activities such as swimming sports, athletics, and house plays. These houses are Tokomaru (yellow), Kurahaupo (blue), Aotea (red) and Tainui (green). The houses are named after four of the first Māori waka to arrive in New Zealand.

== Enrolment ==
As of July 2026, New Plymouth Girls' High School has a roll of 1,301 students, of which 316 (24.3%) identify as Māori.

As of 2026, the school has an Equity Index of 447, placing it amongst schools whose students have below average socioeconomic barriers to achievement (roughly equivalent to deciles 5 and 6 under the former socio-economic decile system).

== Notable staff ==
- Ida Gaskin – politician, Mastermind winner
- Leila Hurle – schoolteacher, schools inspector

=== Principals ===
	Name	Term
1	Catherine Grant	1914
2	Flora Hodges	1915–1916
3	Rhoda Barr	1916–1920
4	Ethel May McIntosh	1920–1924
5	Doris Napier Allan	1925–1943
6	Rose Allum	1943–1968
7	Jean Wilson	1968–1974
8	Noeline Bruning	1975–1988
9	Jain Gaudin	1988–2002
10	Annette Sharp	2002–2004
11	Jenny Ellis	2005–2016
12	Victoria Kerr	2017–2020
13	Jacqui Brown	2020–present

== Notable alumnae ==
- Mackenzie Barry – association footballer
- Daisy Basham – radio personality
- Michaela Blyde – rugby sevens player
- Kendra Cocksedge – rugby union player
- Dale Copeland – collage and assemblage artist
- Trish Gregory – fashion designer and businesswoman
- Paige Hareb – professional surfer
- Leila Hurle – schoolteacher, schools inspector
- Zoe Hobbs - athlete
- Michele Leggott – poet, academic
- Melanie Lynskey – actor
- Margaret Mutu – Ngāti Kahu leader and academic
- Debbie Ngarewa-Packer – politician
- Jean Sandel - surgeon
- Miriam Saphira - psychologist
- Carmel Sepuloni – politician
- Holly Shanahan – actress
- Toni Street – television presenter and sports commentator
- Beatrice Tinsley – astronomer and cosmologist
