= Richmond Hursthouse =

New Zealand politician (1845–1902)

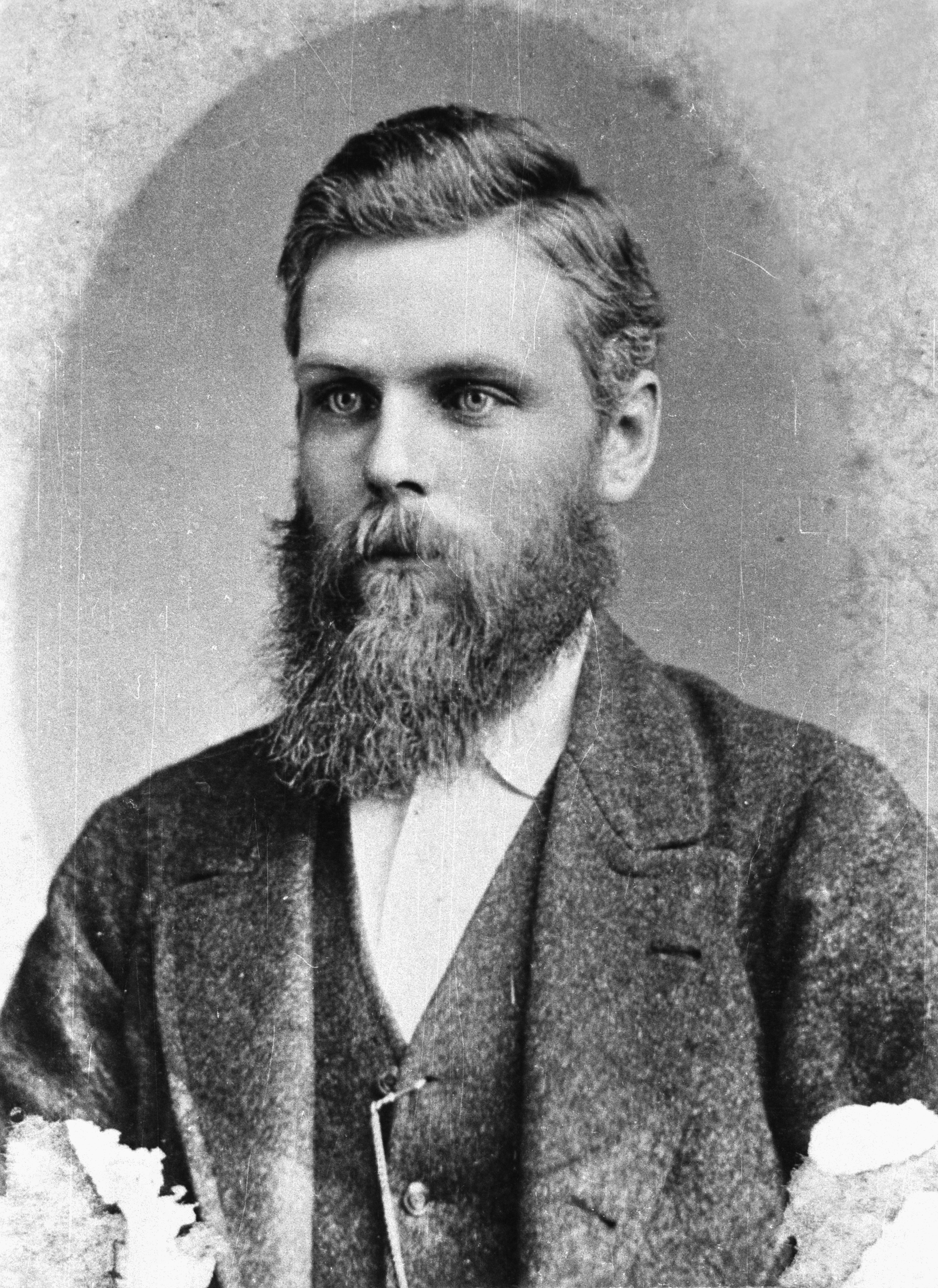
- Hursthouse, c. 1876

Member of the New Zealand Parliament for Motueka
- In office 6 January 1876 – 15 July 1887
- Preceded by: Charles Parker
- Succeeded by: John Kerr

Personal details
- Born: 5 May 1845 New Plymouth, New Zealand
- Died: 11 November 1902 (aged 57) New Plymouth, New Zealand
- Relations: Charles Wilson Hursthouse (brother); Torchy Atkinson (grandson); Rosalind Hursthouse (great-granddaughter); Rangimarie Hetet (niece); Kae Miller (granddaughter); Percy Smith (cousin); Henry Richmond (cousin); James Crowe Richmond (cousin); William Richmond (cousin); Jane Maria Atkinson (cousin)

Richmond Hursthouse (5 May 1845 – 11 November 1902) was a New Zealand soldier and politician.

== Early and personal life ==
Hursthouse was born in New Plymouth, on 5 May 1845, soon after his family's emigration from England. His parents were John Hursthouse (1811–1860) and Helen, née Wilson (1803–1895). His parents and other family members (his father's brother, Charles Flinders Hursthouse, and a cousin, Thomas Newsham, and their families) came to New Zealand on the Thomas Sparks; they arrived in Wellington in early 1843. John Hursthouse and family proceeded to New Plymouth, but the outbreak of the First Taranaki War saw the family move to Nelson. Richmond Hursthouse's education was restricted to one year at Nelson's Bishop's School.

In 1873, he married Mary Fearon, the daughter of Edward Fearon. She died in September 1901.

== Military ==
Aged 19, he helped with the survey of Westport. Afterwards, he returned to New Plymouth and was in the militia. He participated in various gold rushes, including Thames, Gulgong in New South Wales, and Coromandel.

== Politics ==
New Zealand Parliament
Years	Term	Electorate	Party
1876–1879	6th	Motueka	Independent
1879–1881	7th	Motueka	Independent
1881–1884	8th	Motueka	Independent
1884–1887	9th	Motueka	Independent

Hursthouse represented the Motueka electorate from 1876 to 1887. In 1884, he held the portfolio of Minister for Lands and Immigration during the brief fourth Atkinson Ministry.

For many years, he was a member of the Nelson Land Board and of the Nelson Education Board.

He stood for Waimea-Picton in 1890, Motueka in 1896, and for the City of Nelson electorate in 1893 and 1899, and came second each time.

When Motueka became a borough council in 1900, he was the town's first mayor.

Hursthouse died in New Plymouth, on 11 November 1902, aged 57, after falling ill with pneumonia while campaigning for the Egmont electorate. He was buried at Te Henui Cemetery.

== Notes ==
New Zealand Parliament
Preceded by Charles Parker	Member of Parliament for Motueka; 1876–1887	Succeeded by John Kerr
