= Wetere Te Rerenga =

Hone Wetere Te Rerenga (? – 9 March 1889) was a notable New Zealand Māori tribal leader. He identified with the Ngāti Maniapoto iwi. He was born in Maniaroa or Rangitoto, in the King Country, New Zealand.

He unsuccessfully contested the Western Maori electorate in the 1884 election. Of eight candidates, he came fourth with 9.99% of the vote.
