= Charles Flinders Hursthouse =

English-born settler in New Zealand (1817–1876)

Charles Flinders Hursthouse (7 January 1817 – 22 November 1876) was an English-born settler in New Zealand in the early 1840s. He wrote a number of books and pamphlets encouraging emigration to New Zealand, and gave lectures in England on the same subject on behalf of the New Zealand Company. In an 1869 pamphlet he advocated for the federation of the five eastern Australian colonies and New Zealand to form an Australasian republic.

== Early life and family ==
Born on 7 January 1817 in Wisbech, Cambridgeshire, England, and baptised on 7 December 1819 at Tydd St Mary, Lincolnshire, Hursthouse was the son of Charles and Mary (née Jecks) Hursthouse. Charles Hursthouse Snr was a third cousin of the explorer, Matthew Flinders, and an executor of his will, and Charles Jnr later adopted Flinders' surname as his middle name.

When he was about 19 years old, Hursthouse was sent by his family to Canada and the United States to investigate the prospects for emigrating there. He found the winters to be harsh and advised his family against such a move. Back in England he became a carpenter.

His nephews included Richmond Hursthouse, Charles Wilson Hursthouse and Percy Smith.

== Association with New Zealand ==
After reading an account by Henry William Petre of the New Zealand Company's settlements, published in 1841, Hursthouse and his older brother, John, decided to emigrate to New Zealand. They travelled on the barque Thomas Sparkes, arriving in early 1843, and settled in the New Plymouth area.

Hursthouse returned to England in late 1848 to encourage family members to emigrate, and he wrote An Account of the Settlement of New Plymouth, which was published in London in 1849. Members of Hursthouse's family, including his father and various siblings and cousins, also emigrated to New Zealand. Meanwhile, Hursthouse was engaged by the New Zealand Company to give lectures on the colony, but he returned to New Zealand in 1854 to increase his knowledge in order to write a handbook for settlers.

After returning to England once again, Hursthouse published in 1857 his two-volume work, New Zealand, or Zealandia, the Britain of the South, regarded at the time as a standard work on New Zealand, but which has more recently been described by historian James Belich as "merging history with propaganda and prophecy". Hursthouse continued to advise prospective emigrants, charging a fee of one guinea, and write further works on New Zealand, including letters to the editor of The Times in London. In May 1869, the Taranaki Provincial Council passed a resolution thanking Hursthouse for his "deep interest ... in the welfare of New Zealand during the last twenty-five years".

In 1869 and 1870, Hursthouse advocated that New Zealand and the Australian colonies, excluding Western Australia, should federate to form an independent Australasian republic, comparing their situation to that of the United States a century earlier and setting out the benefits that would accrue from such action.

In September 1870 Hursthouse arrived back to New Zealand, staying briefly in Wellington before returning to New Plymouth, where he remained until 1875.

== Later life and death ==
Hursthouse spent the last few months of his life at the Mount View Lunatic Asylum in Wellington, afflicted by mental illness and convulsions. He died there on 22 November 1876, and was buried at Bolton Street Cemetery.
