= Charles Wilson Hursthouse =

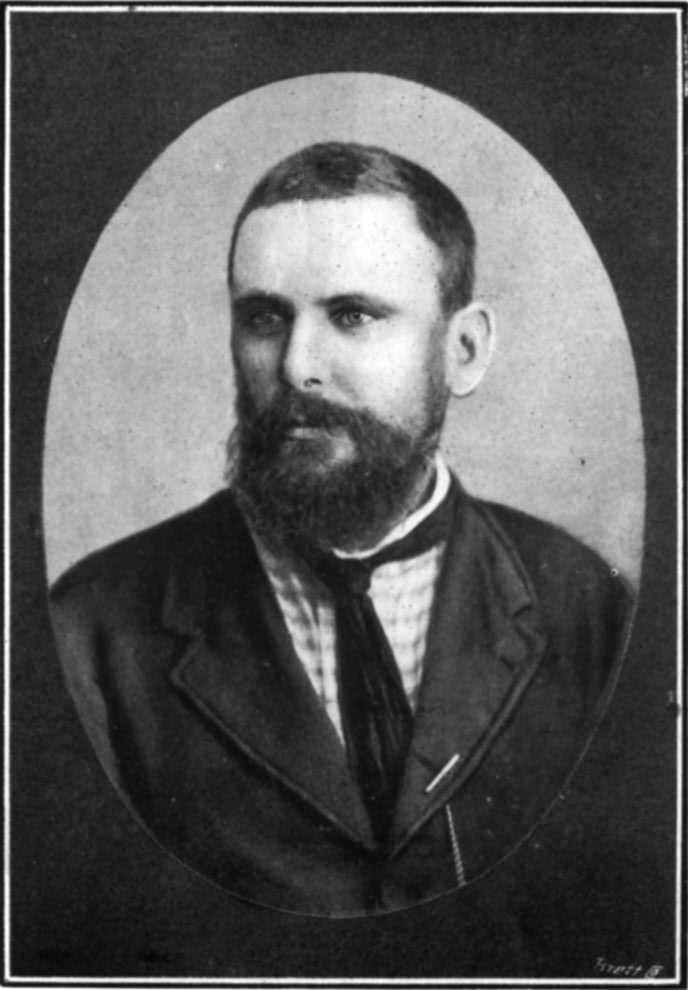
- Born: 26 June 1841; Norwich, England
- Died: 25 February 1911 (aged 69); Lower Hutt, New Zealand
- Occupations: Surveyor, public servant, politician, and soldier
- Known for: Chief engineer of the Department for Road Works
- Notable work: Survey of North Island Main Trunk railway through the King Country
- Children: Rangimarie Hetet
- Relatives: Richmond Hursthouse (brother); Diggeress Te Kanawa (granddaughter); Rangi Hetet (great-grandson); Veranoa Hetet (gt-gt-granddaughter); Henry Richmond (cousin); William Richmond (cousin); Jane Maria Atkinson (cousin); James Crowe Richmond (cousin); Percy Smith (cousin); Rosalind Hursthouse

Charles Wilson Hursthouse (26 June 1841 – 25 February 1911), also known by his Māori name Wirihana, was an English-born New Zealand surveyor, public servant, politician, and soldier. He laid out part of the North Island Main Trunk railway through the King Country.

== Early life ==
Hursthouse was born in 1841 in Norwich, England. His parents were John Hursthouse (1811–1860) and Helen, née Wilson (1803–1895). His parents and other family members (his father's brother, Charles Flinders Hursthouse, and a cousin, Thomas Newsham, and their families) came to New Zealand on the Thomas Sparks; they arrived in Wellington on 31 January 1843. John Hursthouse and family proceeded to New Plymouth, where Charles Hursthouse received his education.

== Professional life and militia ==
In 1855, Hursthouse joined the survey department as a cadet, being promoted to assistant surveyor in 1857. He was sent to undertake the Waitara survey after land there got confiscated, but the situation escalated into the First Taranaki War. Hursthouse participated in the First and Second Taranaki War until 1864, and was present at the Battle of Waireka and at Mahoetahi. In 1866, he was made an ensign of the Military Settlers; in 1869, he was promoted to lieutenant of the Taranaki militia; and in 1881, he was promoted to captain of the New Zealand militia. He retired from the militia in 1905.

== Political career ==
Hursthouse represented the Grey and Bell electorate on the fourth and fifth Taranaki Provincial Council from 25 September 1868 to 10 February 1870.

== Life after the Taranaki Wars ==
In 1871, Hursthouse was appointed by Taranaki Province as a surveyor in their public works department. In 1875, he was promoted to resident engineer, based in New Plymouth. In 1880, he was surveying roads to Parihaka and in November 1880, he was present at the invasion of Parihaka. In late 1882 and early 1883, he accompanied the Minister of Native Affairs, John Bryce, to Kawhia and the King Country, and was present at Mangaorongo when Te Kooti was pardoned.

In March 1883, Hursthouse and his cousin, Thomas Newsham, were imprisoned by Te Mahuki of the Ngāti Maniapoto tribe. After 41 hours of ill-treatment, their rescue was facilitated by Wetere Te Rerenga. From the end of 1884, Hursthouse worked on the survey for the North Island Main Trunk railway between Te Awamutu and Otorohanga through the King Country, and later to Mokau (since renamed to Puketutu). Hursthouse supervised the construction of the tunnel near Poro-o-Tarao.

In 1891, Hursthouse transferred to the Lands and Survey department, and he was in charge of road construction in the King Country. The Rotorua road district was later came under his responsibility, too. In 1899, he was transferred to Wellington. In 1901, a separate department for road works was established, and Hursthouse was appointed its chief engineer. He retired from public service on 30 March 1909.

== Family and death ==
His mother, Helen Hursthouse (née Wilson), was the aunt of a number of Richmond siblings: Henry Richmond, William Richmond, Jane Maria Atkinson, and James Crowe Richmond. Richmond Hursthouse, born in 1845, was his younger brother. Charles Wilson Hursthouse married Ellen Humphries. She was the daughter of Dr. Edward Larwill Humphries, who was a surgeon and speaker of the Taranaki Provincial Council for four years. They had at least seven children.

Hursthouse had a daughter with Mere Te Rongopamamao Aubrey; Rangimarie Hetet was born in 1892. Hetet's biography states that both her parents had previous relationships. Hetet's daughter was Diggeress Te Kanawa, with her first name honouring her father, who was a digger with the New Zealand (Māori) Pioneer Battalion in World War I. Hursthouse's daughter and granddaughter were both regarded as master weavers, and his daughter was appointed Dame Commander of the Order of the British Empire.

After a long illness, he died on 25 February 1911 at his residence in Lower Hutt. He was survived by his wife, three daughters, and four sons. He is buried at Taita Cemetery in Lower Hutt. Ellen Hursthouse died in 1925 and is buried next to him.
