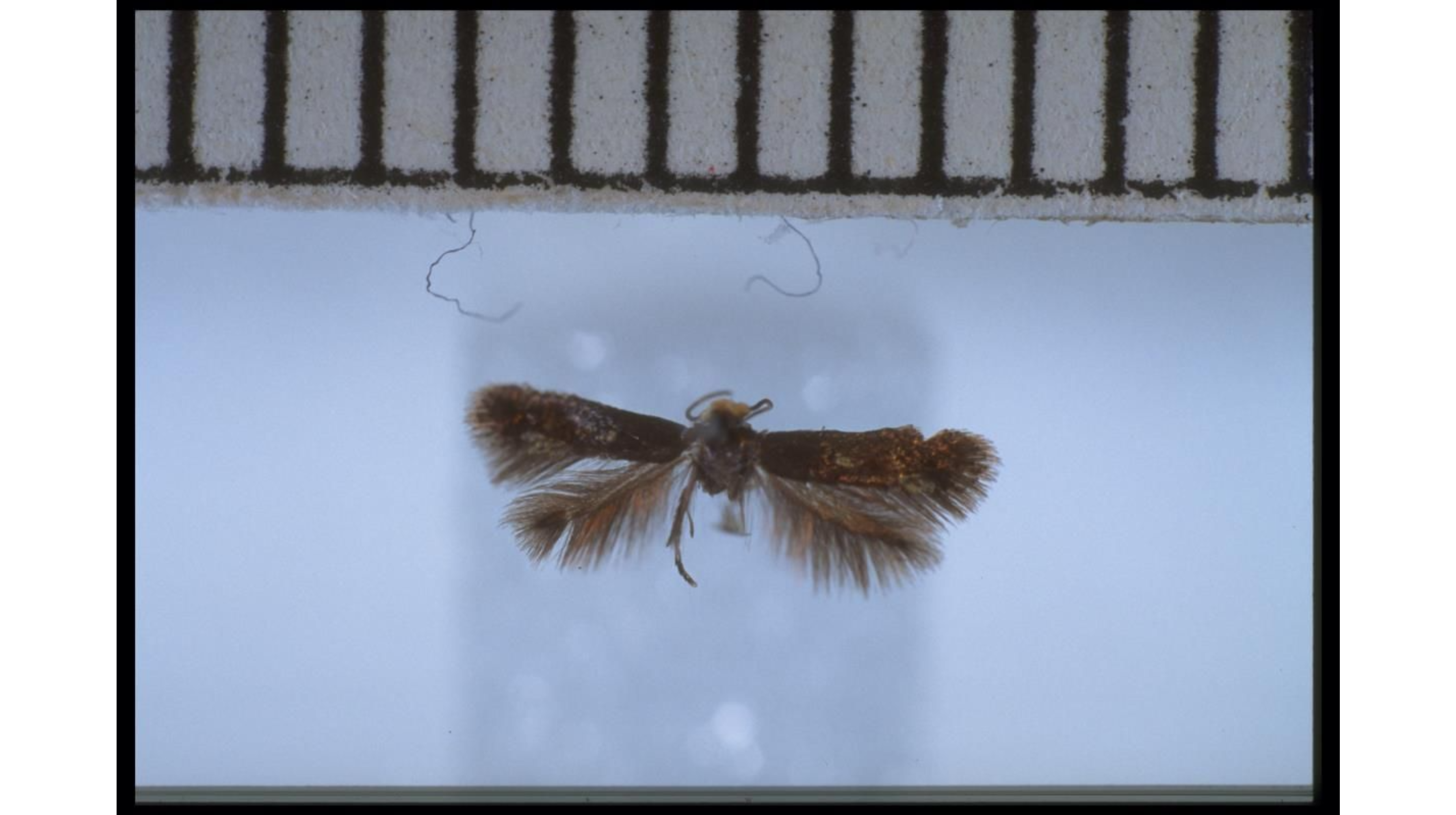
- Male holotype

Scientific classification
- Kingdom: Animalia
- Phylum: Arthropoda
- Clade: Pancrustacea
- Class: Insecta
- Order: Lepidoptera
- Family: Nepticulidae
- Genus: Stigmella
- Species: S. hoheriae

Binomial name
- Stigmella hoheriae Donner & Wilkinson, 1989

= Stigmella hoheriae =

Species of moth

Stigmella hoheriae is a species of moth of the family Nepticulidae. This day flying moth is found in New Zealand in both the North and South Islands. It inhabits native forest. Eggs are laid on the surface of a still growing leaf of a host plant. Larvae feed on Hoheria species such as Hoheria glabrata, Hoheria populnea, Hoheria sexstylosa and Hoheria angustifolia and have been recorded from February to August. The larvae of S. hoheriae are leaf miners. Their mines create blotches on the host plant leaves. S. hoheriae larvae pupate in a silk cocoon on the ground at the base of their food plant. Adult moths have been observed on the wing in February and from July to December. This species is rarely noticed as it is very small and as a result does not tend to attract attention when on the wing.

== Taxonomy ==
This species was first described in 1989 by Hans Donner and Christopher Wilkinson from specimens collected in the Auckland, Rangitiikei, Mid Canterbury, Mackenzie, Fiordland and Otago regions. The male holotype specimen, collected at Te Rau-o-te-Huia / Mount Donald McLean in the Waitākere Ranges, Auckland, emerged 17 August 1976 "ex Hoheria populnea", by J. S. Dugdale.

== Description ==
The larvae of this species are 2–3 mm long and pale transparent green.

Donner and Wilkinson described the male of the species as follows:

Head. Frontal tuft and scape cream; collar brownish cream; antenna brown, comprising 45-52 segments. Thorax brown. Forewing 3-4 mm long, brown, lustrous, reflecting gold, with a small spot at dorsum medially varying from clearly present to almost absent; fringe grey. Hindwing and fringe grey, lustrous, reflecting platinum. Abdomen greyish brown.

They described the female as follows:

As for male, but forewing 4 mm long, brown, iridescent, reflecting purple, with anal half white for three-quarters of length.

== Distribution ==
This species is endemic to New Zealand. S. hoheriae is found in both the North and South Islands and is very common throughout New Zealand.

== Life history ==
=== Eggs ===
The females lay eggs on the surface of a still growing leaf of their host plant.

=== Larvae ===
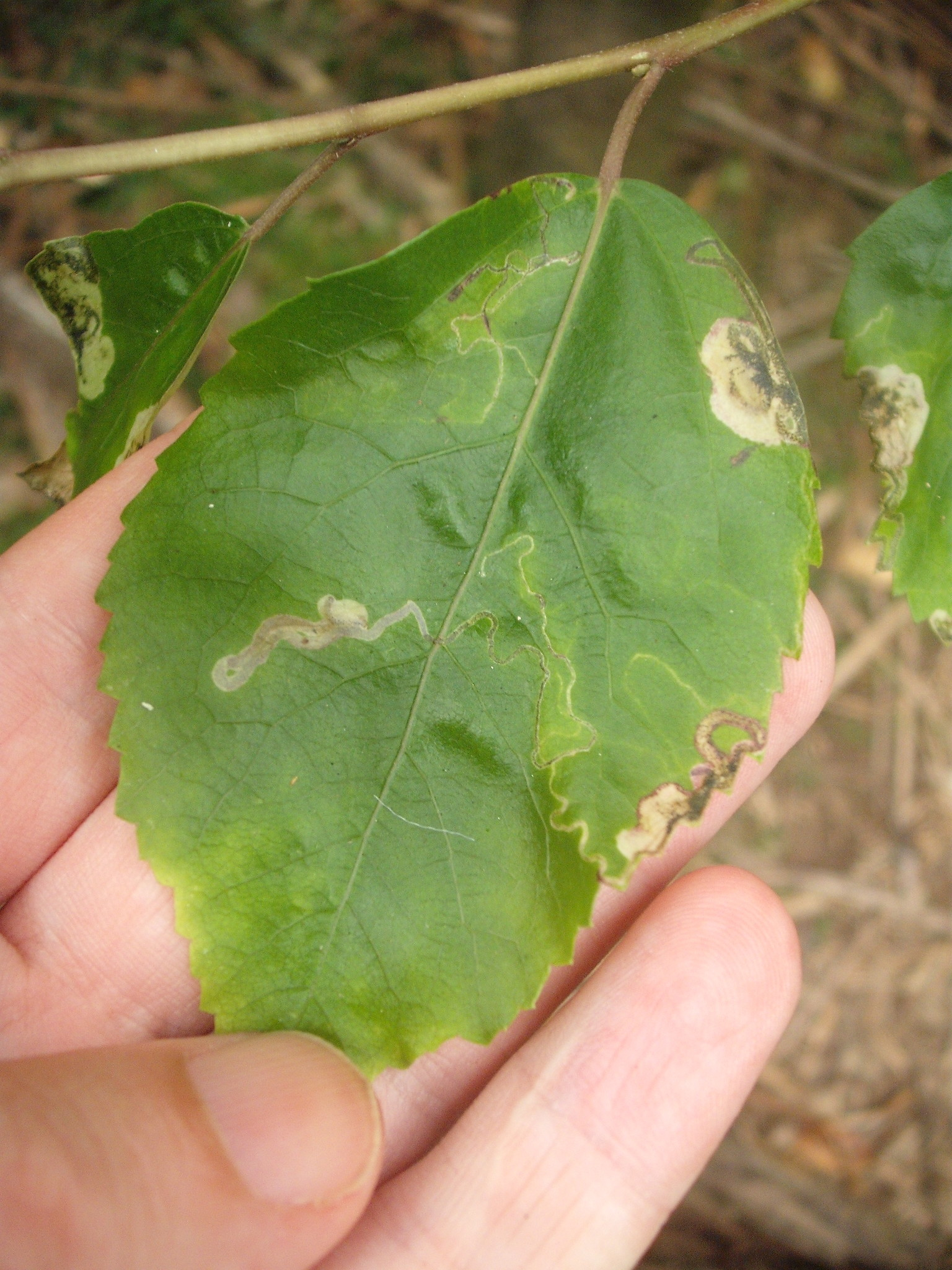
Larval mine of S. hoheriae on a Hoheria populnea leaf.

Larva have been recorded from February to August. They mine the leaves of their host plant.

=== Adults ===
Adult moths have been observed on the wing in the wild in February and July—December.

== Behaviour ==
Adults are day flying and are most commonly on the wing from August to November. It is likely there are two generations per year. The species is rarely noticed as the adults are very small and as a result does not tend to attract attention.

== Habitat and host species ==
This species inhabits native forest habitat. The larvae feed on Hoheria species such as Hoheria glabrata, Hoheria populnea, Hoheria sexstylosa and Hoheria angustifolia.
