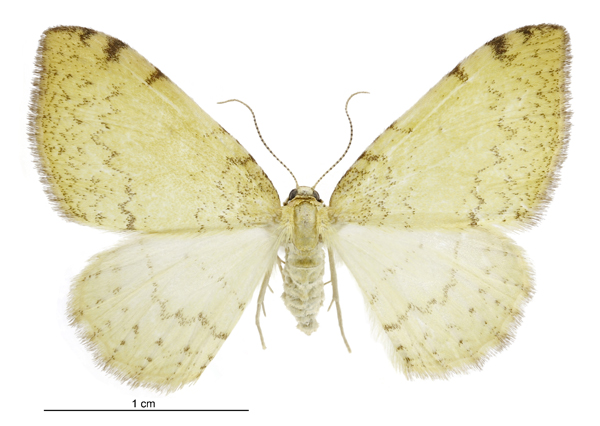
- Female
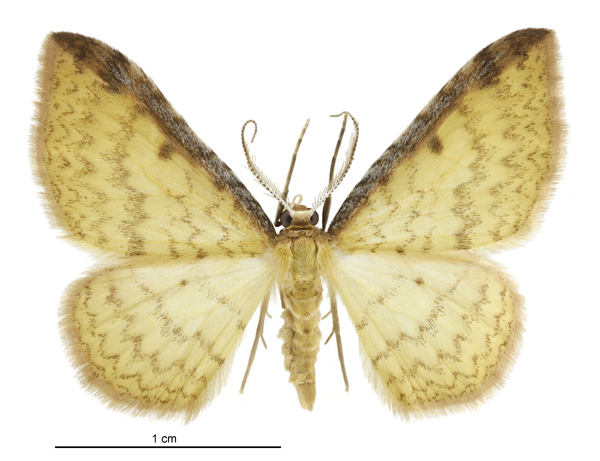
- Male

Scientific classification
- Kingdom: Animalia
- Phylum: Arthropoda
- Clade: Pancrustacea
- Class: Insecta
- Order: Lepidoptera
- Family: Geometridae
- Genus: Epiphryne
- Species: E. undosata

Binomial name
- Epiphryne undosata (Felder & Rogenhofer, 1875)

Synonyms
- Cidaria undosata Felder & Rogenhofer, 1875; Epiphryne citrinata Warren, 1903; Venusia undosata (Felder & Rogenhofer, 1875)

= Epiphryne undosata =

Species of moth endemic to New Zealand

Epiphryne undosata, also known as the lacebark looper, is a moth of the family Geometridae. It is endemic to New Zealand and is found on both the North and South Islands. It inhabits native forest. The larvae feed on plant species in the genera Hoheria and Plagianthus. They pupate amongst dead leaves in a silk cocoon. The adult moths have been observed on the wing all year round but are most commonly seen from November until February. The adult moths are extremely variable in both their colour intensity and wing pattern.

== Taxonomy ==
This species was first described by Baron Cajetan von Felder, Rudolf Felder and Alois Friedrich Rogenhofer in 1875 using a specimen collected in Nelson by T. R. Oxley and named Cidaria undosata. In 1884 Edward Meyrick placed this species in the genus Epiphryne. However George Hudson discussed and illustrated this species in both 1898 and 1828 under the name Venusia undosata. In 1988 J. S. Dugdale discussed this species under the name Epiphryne undosata. The syntype is held at the Natural History Museum, London.

== Description ==
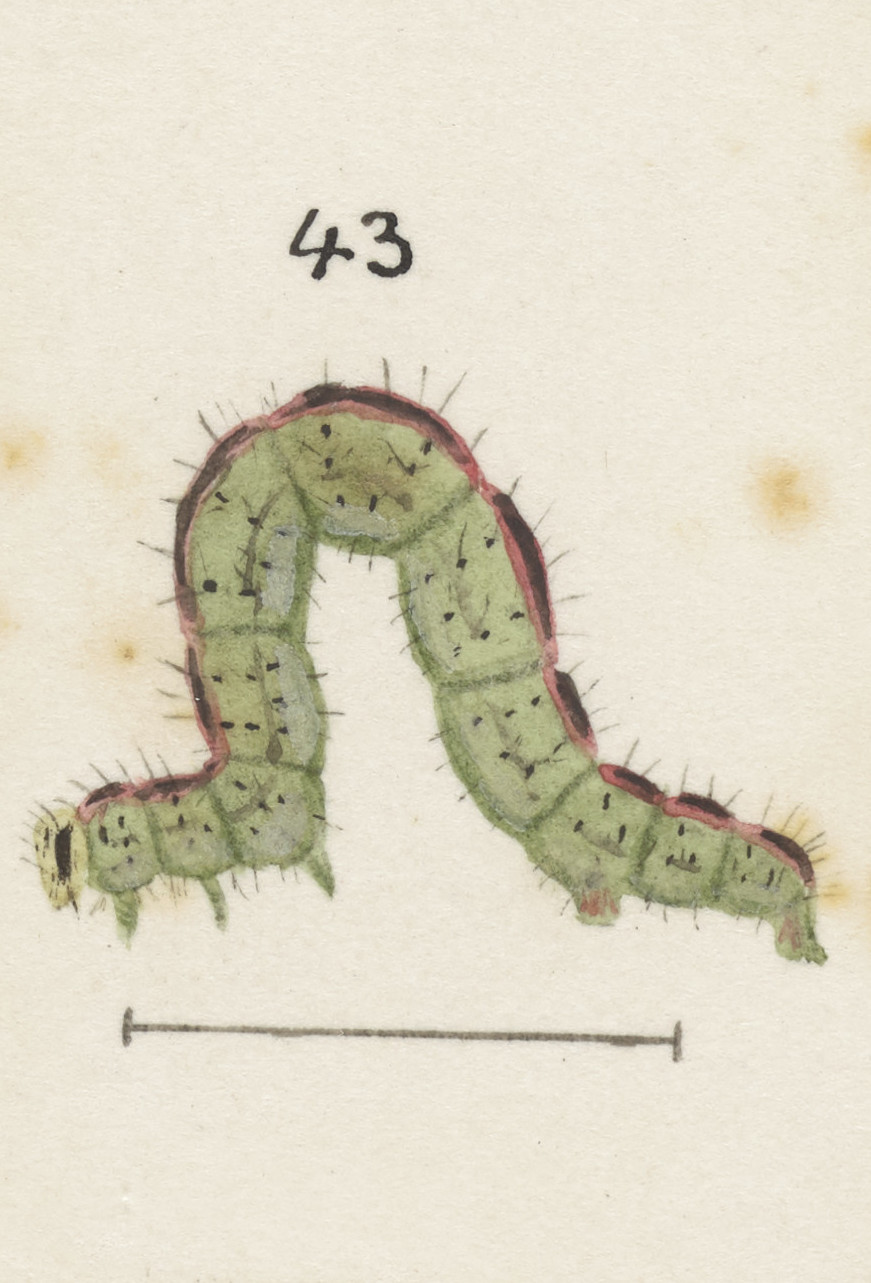
Larva of E. undosata.

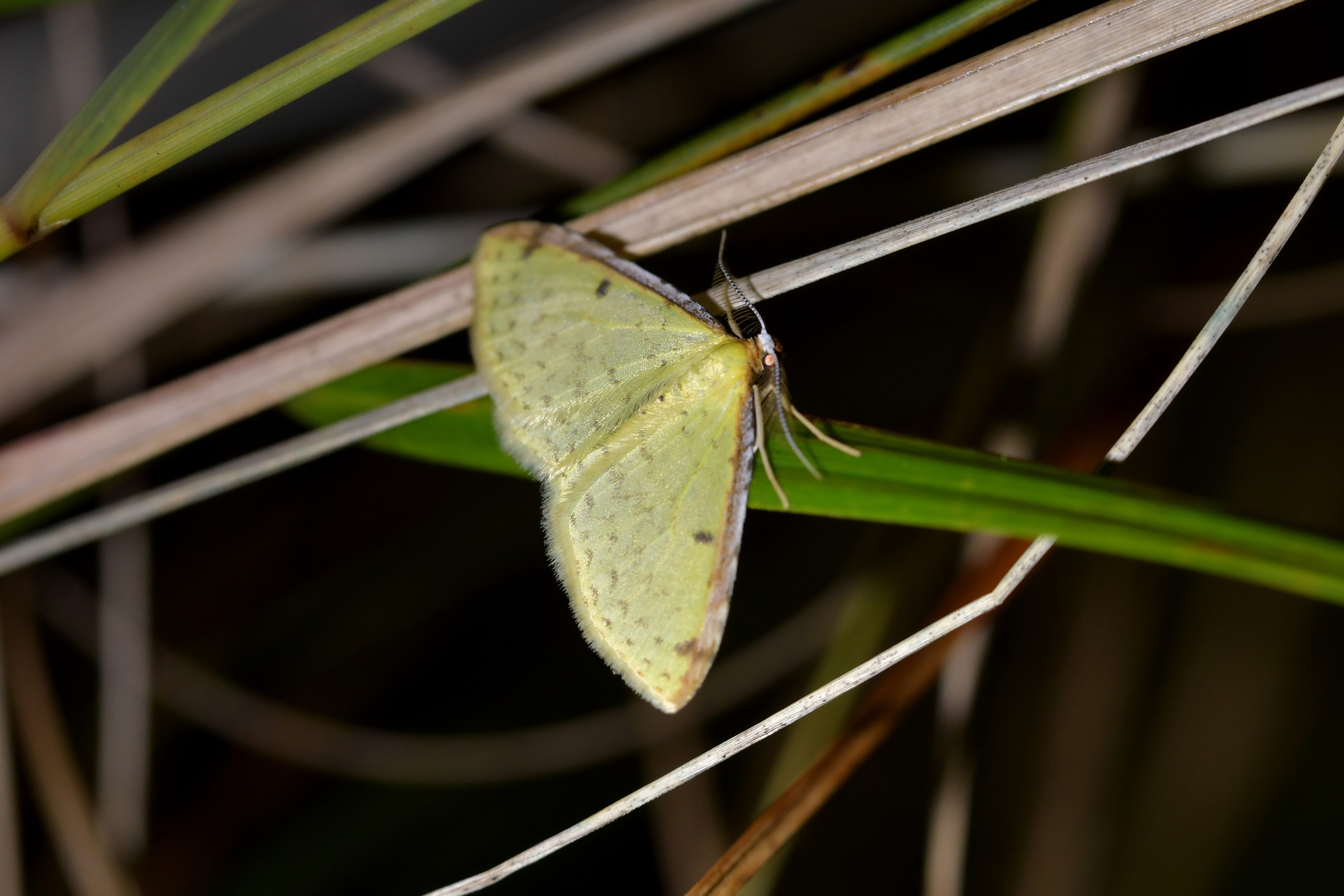

Hudson described the larva of this species as follows:

slightly over 1/2 inch in length, rather stout, green, paler underneath, with the skin slightly wrinkled; the head is ochreous; there is a broad dull crimson dorsal line containing a central black bar on each segment; two or three rows of conspicuous black warts emitting short black bristles, and a very indistinct greyish lateral line.

Robert Hoare pointed out that white stripe along the back of the larva helps camouflage it as it resembles the leaf vein on the leaves on some of its host plants.

Hudson described the adult of the species as follows:

The expansion of the wings is hardly an inch. All the wings arc pale yellow with a variable number of fine jagged reddish-brown transverse lines, which are usually most distinct towards the termen. The fore-wings have a broad band of reddish-brown along the costal edge; a blackish dot above the middle just touching the costal band, and a small brown mark near the apex. The hind-wings have a minute black dot a little above the middle.

The adult moths are variable in both colour intensity and pattern.

== Distribution ==
This species is endemic to New Zealand. It can be found in both the North and South Islands. It is regarded as being locally common.

== Habitat ==
This species inhabits native forest, particularly riverine forest, and has been observed in numbers near lace-bark trees. It has also been observed Kunzea ericoides forest.

== Life history and behaviour ==
The eggs of this species are greenish in colour and hatch after approximately two weeks. Larvae are active and feed on the leaves and seeds of their host plants during the New Zealand spring and summer. The larvae pupate amongst dead leaves with the pupa being enclosed in a delicate silken cocoon. Adults have been observed on the wing all year but can be seen most commonly from November until February. The adults are nocturnal, are attracted to light and have been collected via light traps.

== Host plants and parasites ==
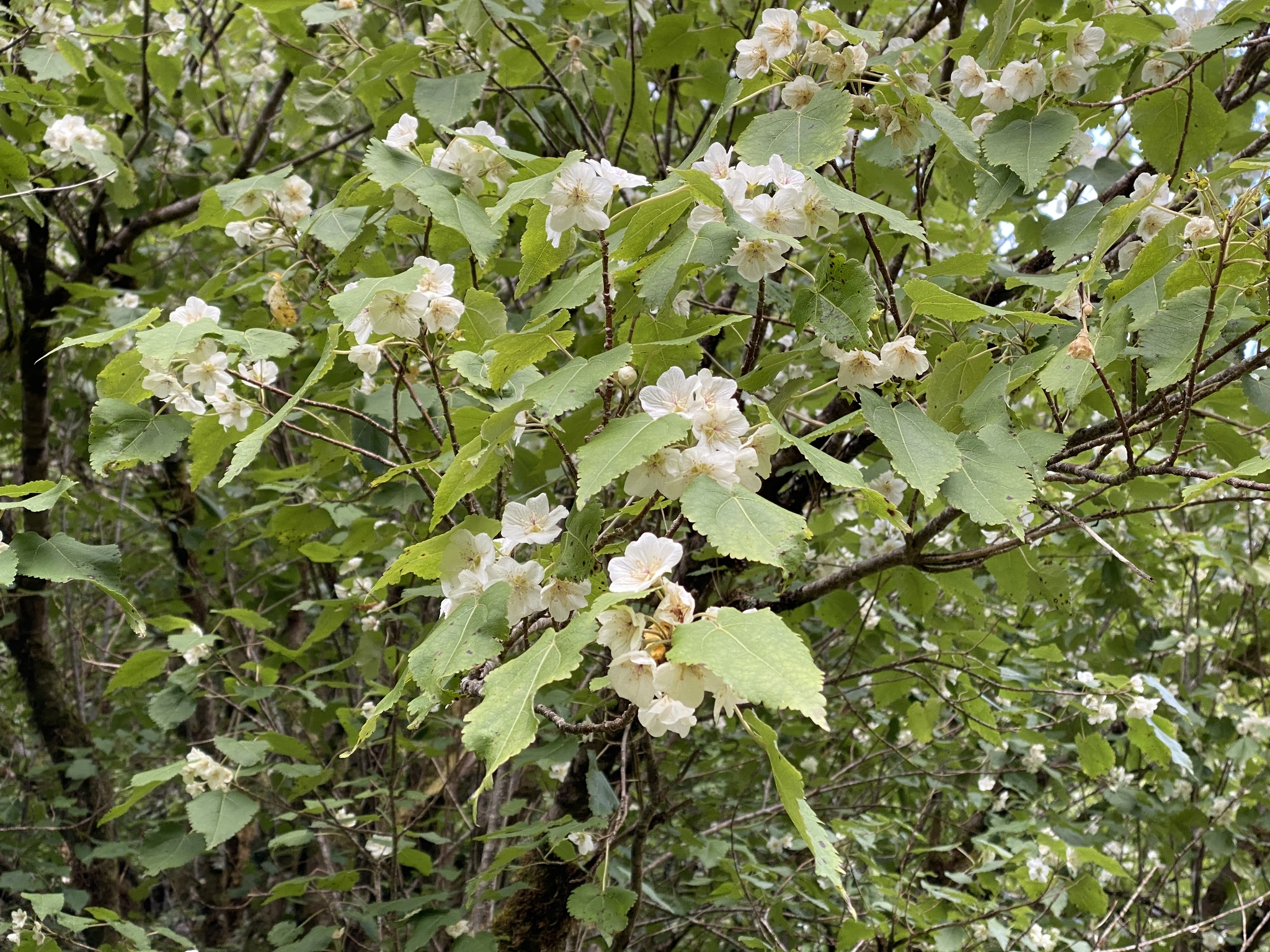
Larval host plant Hoheria glabrata.

Larval host plants of this species include Hoheria glabrata, Hoheria populnea, Hoheria sexstylosa, and Plagianthus regius. Adult E. undosata feed from the flowers and assist with the pollination of Dracophyllum acerosum, Hoheria lyallii, and Veronica salicifolia. The larvae of E. undosata have been parasitised by the wasp Meteorus pulchricornis.

== Conservation status ==
This species is regarded as "not threatened".
