= Māori traditional textiles =

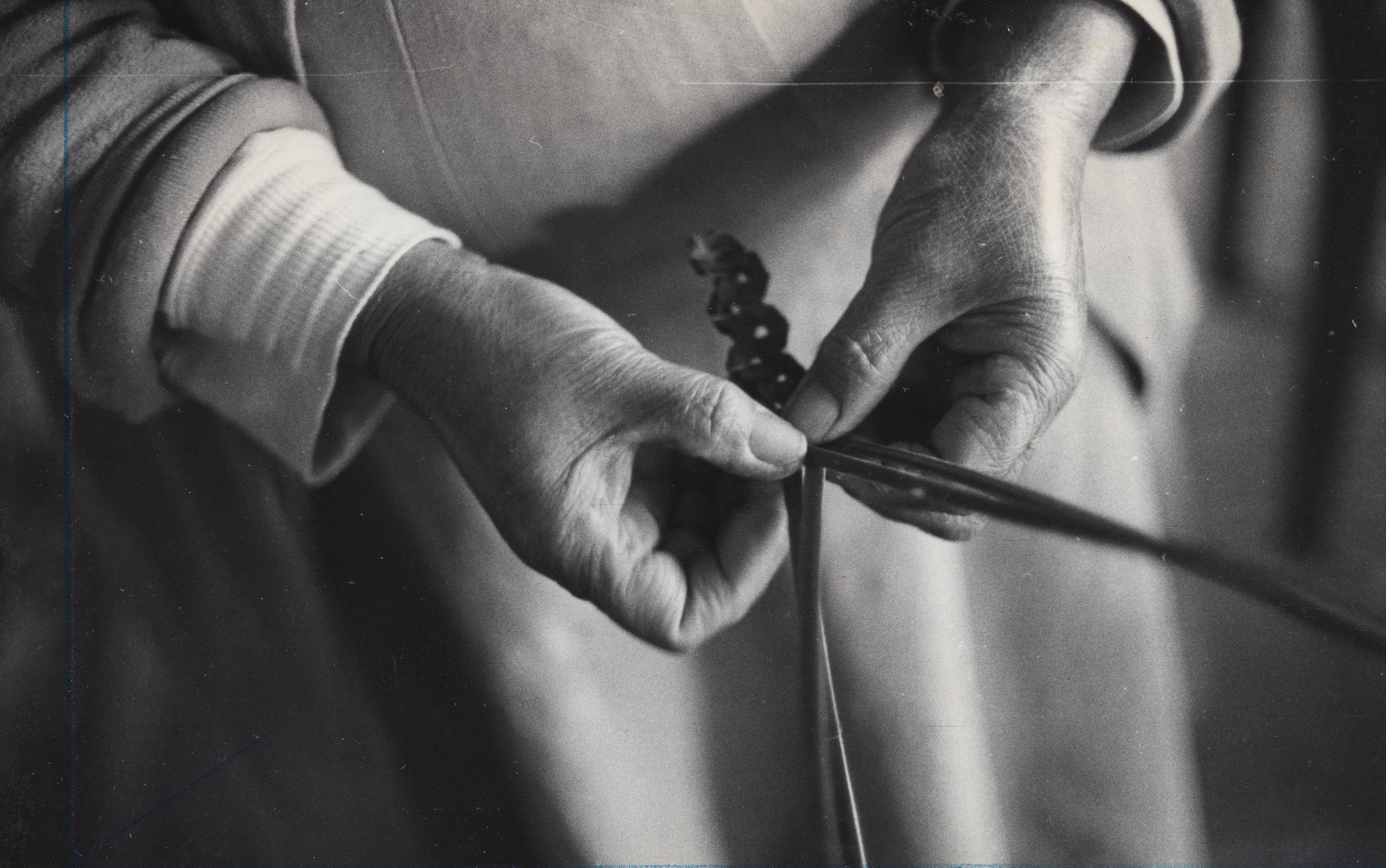
Weaving of kiekie leaves

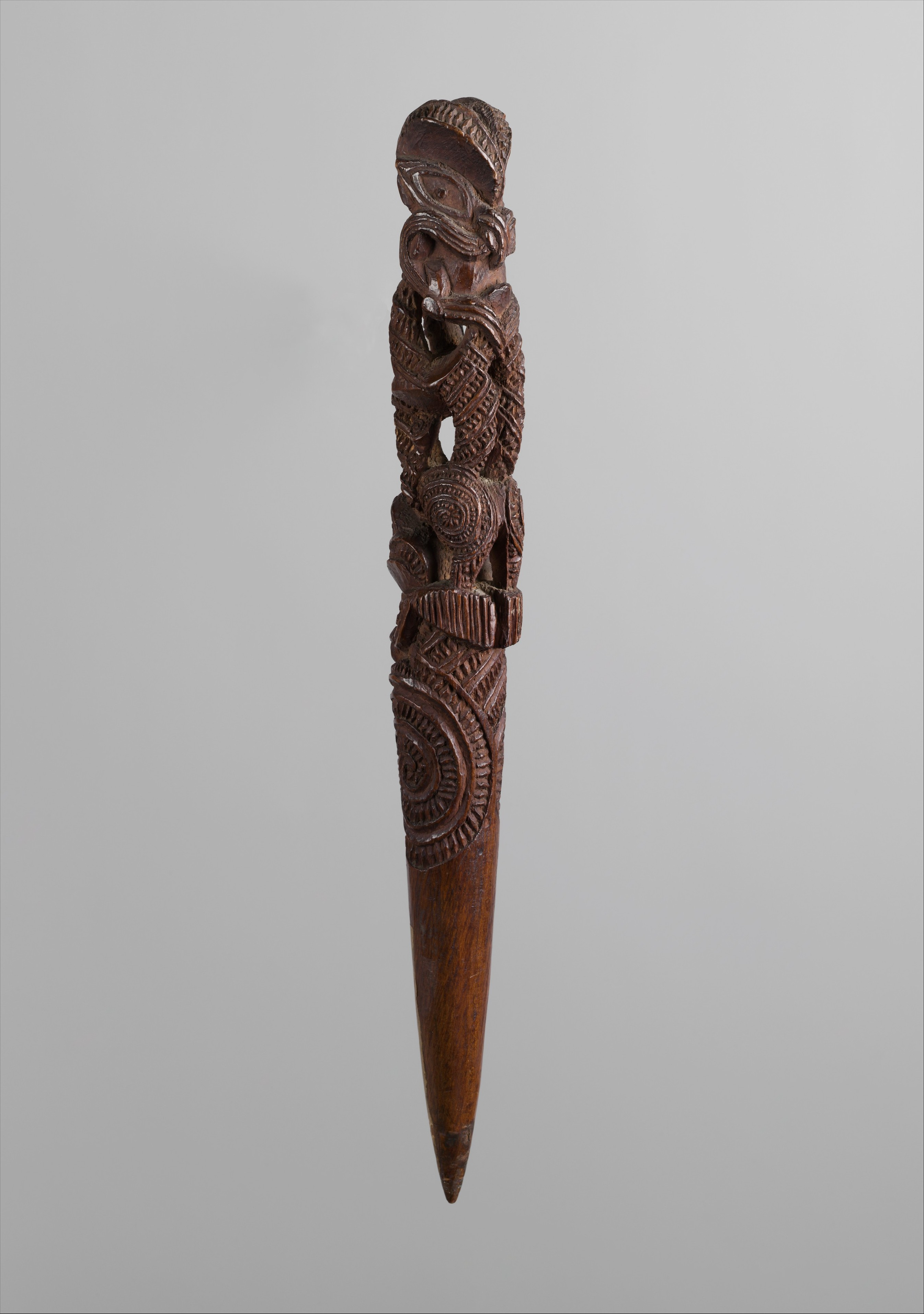
Weaving peg

Māori traditional textiles are the indigenous textiles of the Māori people of New Zealand. The organisation Te Roopu Raranga Whatu o Aotearoa, the national Māori weavers' collective, aims to preserve and foster the skills of making and using these materials.

Textiles made from locally sourced materials were developed by Māori in New Zealand after migration from tropical Polynesia as plants brought with them, especially the pandanus, did not grow well in New Zealand's temperate climate. In traditional Māori weaving of garments the main fibre is called muka and is made from harakeke. The Māori language terms for different types of weaving are commonly named as raranga, whatu and whiri. Raranga is a plaiting technique used for making baskets and mats; whatu is a pre-European finger weft twining weaving method used to make cloaks; and whiri is braiding to make cord. Most people weaving traditional Māori textiles were and are women. Traditionally, to become expert a young woman was initiated into Te Whare Pora (The House of Weaving). This has been described as a literal building but also as a state of being. There are certain practices for people in Te Whare Pora, and their work output includes nurturing and gathering plants for use in weaving, preparing fibre and dyeing, and creating garments including fine cloaks, mats, kete (baskets and bags) and tukutuku panels (used in architecture). Māori fibre techniques are also used for making fishing and bird nets, kites, rope, bindings for tools, jewellery, waka, building structures, poi and food storage containers.

== Weaving process ==
The weaving process (whatu) for clothing was performed not with a loom and shuttle but with the threads being manipulated and tied with fingers. A strong thread is fastened tautly in a horizontal position between two or four upright weaving sticks (turuturu). To this thread (tawhiu) are attached the upper ends of the warp or vertical threads (io). The warp is arranged close together. The weaving process consisted of working in cross-threads from left to right. The closer these threads are together, the tighter the weave, and the finer the garment.

In the case of fine garments four threads are employed in the forming of each aho. The weaver passes two of these threads on either side of the first io or vertical thread, enclosing it. In the continuing the process the two pairs of threads are reversed, those passing behind the first vertical thread would be brought in front of the next one, then behind the next and so on. Each of the down threads would be enclosed between two or four cross-threads every half inch or so.

=== Tāniko ===
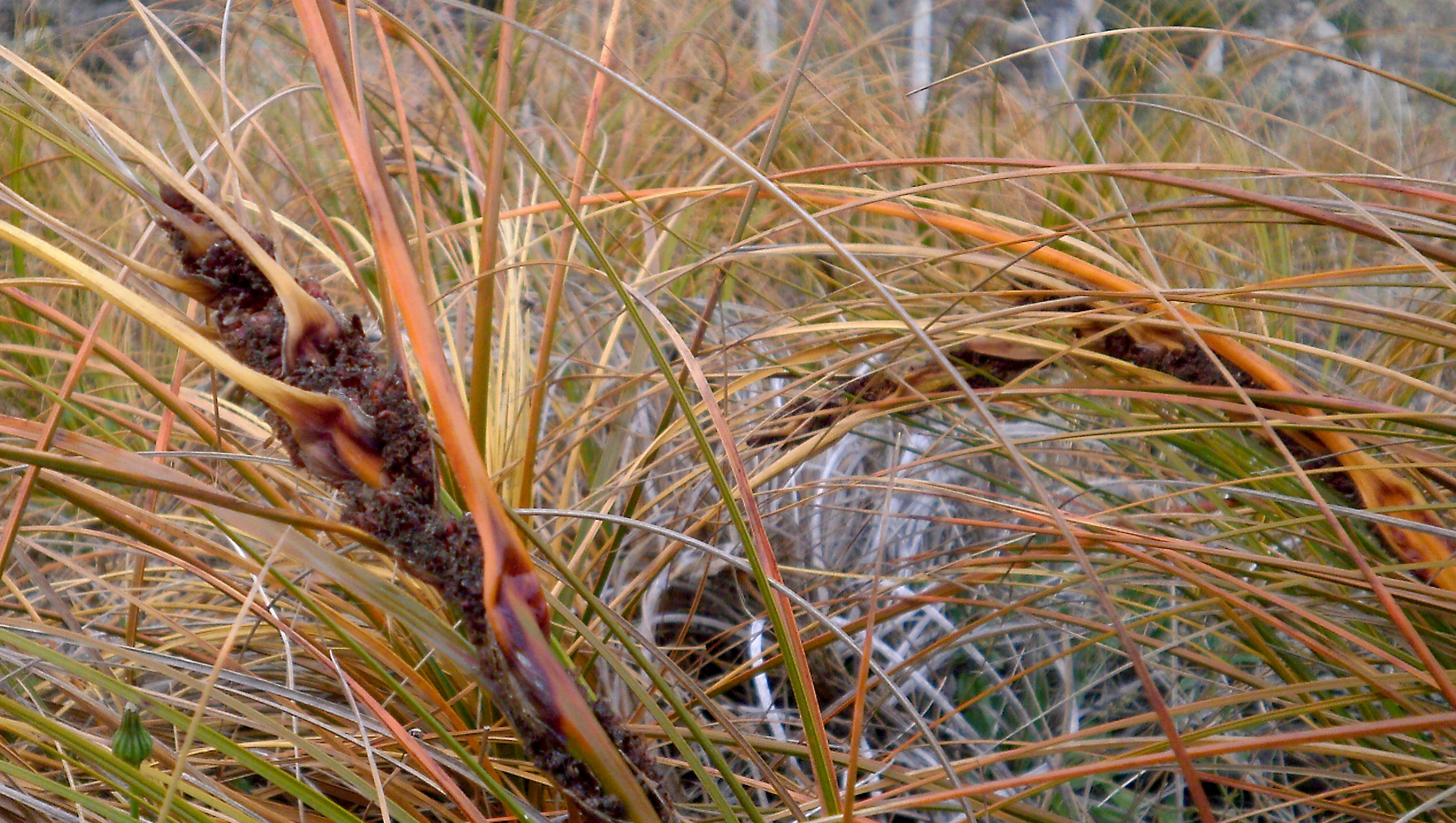
Pīngao - treasured for weaving

Tāniko (or taaniko) refers to any ornamental border typically found on mats and clothes. Tāniko patterns are very geometric in form because they can be reduced down to small coloured squares repeated on a lattice framework. These base square forms, articulated in the hands of a weaver, constitute the larger diamond and triangle shapes that are visible in all traditional weaving crafts.

Pātiki or pātikitiki designs are based on the lozenge or diamond shape of the flounder. They can be quite varied within the basic shape. The kaokao (side or rib) pattern is formed by zigzag lines that create chevrons. These can be horizontal or vertical, open with spaces or closed repetitive lines. The design is sometimes interpreted as the arms of warriors caught in haka (fierce rhythmic dance) action. The niho taniwha (taniwha tooth) pattern is a notched-tooth design found on all types of objects, mats, woven panels, belts, and clothing. The poutama is a stepped design signifying the growth of man, striving ever upwards. Tahekeheke (striped) designs refer to any distinct vertical patterning. The whetū (stars), purapura whetū (weaving pattern of stars) or roimata (teardrop) pattern is a geometric design using two colours and alternating between them at every stitch. This design is associated with the survival of an iwi (tribe), hapū (sub-tribe), or whānau (extended family), the idea being that it is vital to have a large whanau, just as there are many stars in the Milky Way.

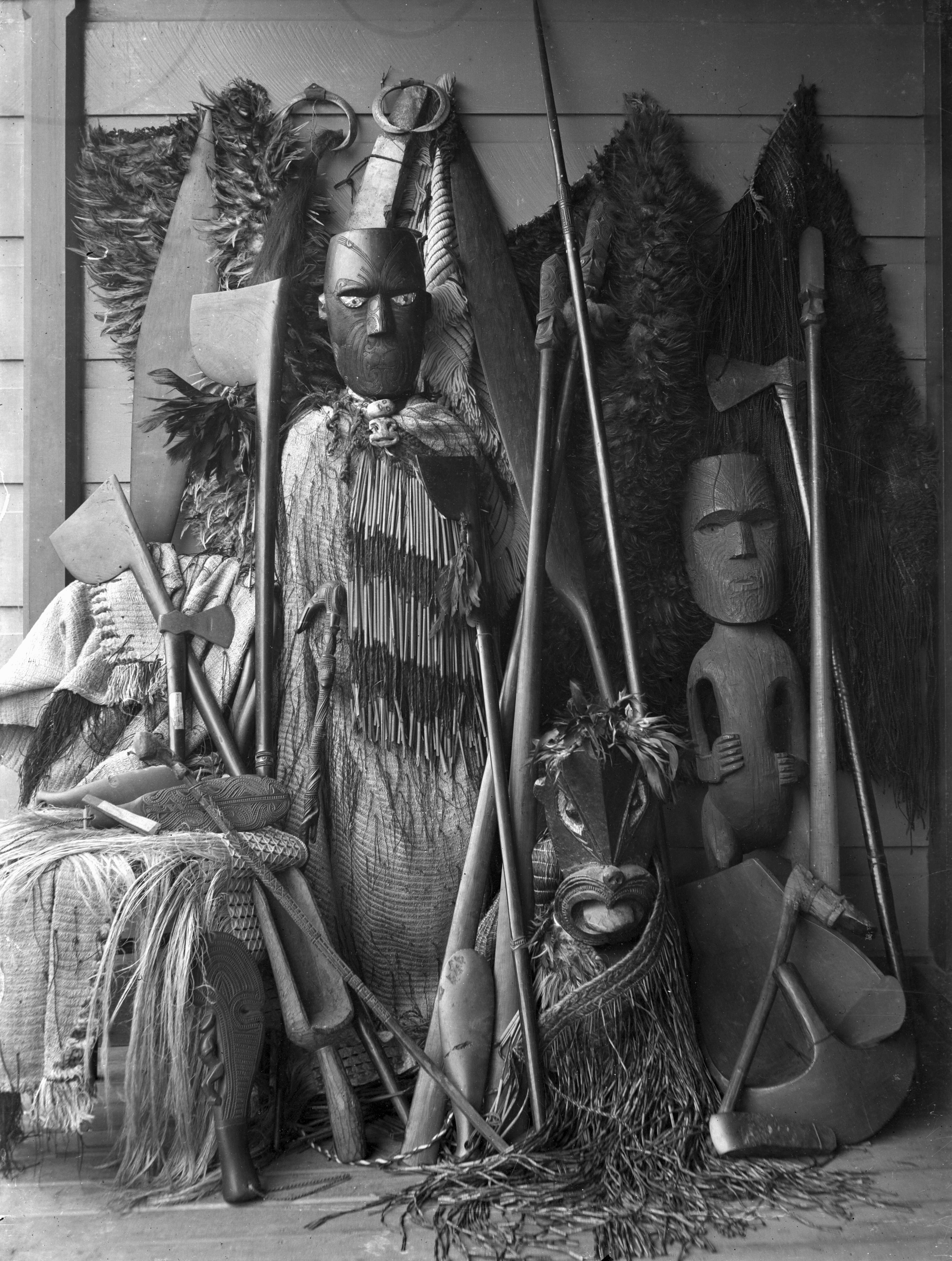
The figure, with paua shell eyes, wears a piupiu, other woven items also on display, ca. 1900

== Fibres and dyes ==
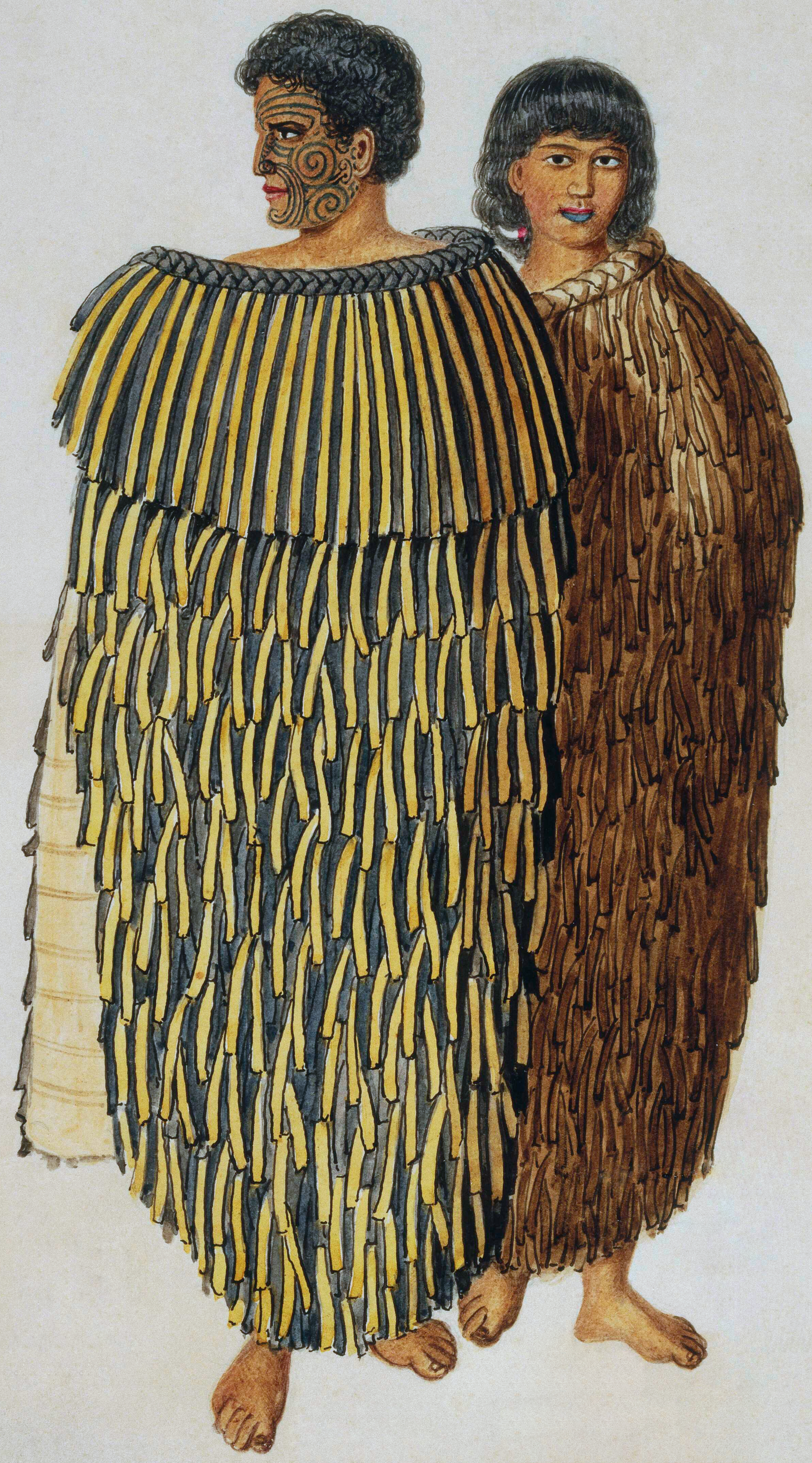
An 1847 portrait of Hōne Heke and his wife Hariata wearing cloaks made from Phormium tenax (New Zealand flax) fibre

Māori made textiles and woven items from a number of plants, including harakeke (New Zealand flax), wharariki, tī kōuka, tōī, pīngao, kiekie, nīkau and toetoe.

Traditional Polynesian methods to create tapa barkcloth were introduced by Māori, who knew it as aute. Oral histories describe the paper mulberry tree as being introduced to New Zealand by the Ōtūrereao, Tainui and Aotea waka. The tree was mostly grown around North Auckland and the Waikato, and did not thrive in southern areas, or grow as well as plants in the Pacific had done. The tree was commonly seen during the voyages of James Cook in the 1770s, primarily used to create a soft, white cloth used for fillets or in ear piercings by high status men, however were rarely seen. Barkcloth textiles disappeared from use in the early 19th Century, coinciding with the tree's disappearance from New Zealand. Oral histories tell of early experiments to create felted material similar to aute from houhere (Hoheria populnea), however attempts were unsuccessful. The bark of other plants such as houhi (Hoheria angustifolia) manatu (Plagianthus regius), autetaranga (Pimelea villosa) and houi (Hoheria glabrata or Hoheria lyallii) have been used in traditional textiles such as fishing nets.

The prepared fibre (muka) of the New Zealand flax (Phormium tenax) became the basis of most clothing. The flax leaves were split and woven into mats, ropes and nets but clothing was often made from the fibre within the leaves. The leaves were stripped using a mussel shell, rolled by hand into two-ply Z-twist cords and twisted gently while it dries, dressed by soaking and pounding with stone pounders, (patu muka), to soften the fibre, spun by rolling the thread against the leg, and woven. Fibres from raupō (Typha orientalis) and upoko-tangata (Cyperus ustulatus) were used in traditional kite building. The fibre of the tī kouka (cordyline australis) plant is durable and so was used for sandals, anchor ropes and sails.

Māori traditionally used raw fibres to create open-weave kete, using the shrinking properties of the fibres for a variety of purposes such as kete kūmara, where the open weave caused dirt to be removed from kūmara (sweet potato), or kete used to drain liquid, such as kete used to collect seafood.

Colours for dyeing muka were sourced from indigenous materials. Paru (mud high in iron salts) provided black, raurēkau bark made yellow, and tānekaha bark made a tan colour. The colours were set by rolling the dyed muka in alum (potash). Red oche clay (kōkōwai) was used to dye muka around the Waitākere Ranges, however its use was rare in other areas of New Zealand.

== Garments ==
There were two types of garments that were worn and woven:

- A knee-length kilt-like garment worn around the waist and secured by a belt
- A rectangular garment worn over the shoulders. This might be a cape-like garment or a long cloak-like garment of finer quality.

Men's belts were known as tātua and women's as tū. The man's belt was usually the more ornate. Belts were usually made of flax but occasionally other materials were used such as kiekie and pīngao. Flax belts were often plaited in patterns with black and white stripes. The belts were secured with a string tie. Women often wore a belt composed of many strands of plaited fibre.

=== Pākē / Hieke ===
To meet the cold and wet conditions of the New Zealand winter, a rain cloak called pākē or hieke was worn. It was made from tags of raw flax or Cordyline partly scraped and set in close rows attached to the muka or plaited fibre base.

In 2000 a cloak-weaving event called Ngā Here o te Ao at Te Papa Tongarewa, the national museum of New Zealand, Dawn Schuster-Smith created a pākē which Te Papa now hold in their collection. The technique to weave it created a very strong foundation in the garment, which is needed to hold the weight of the six layers of undyed hollow lengths of harakeke.

A type of garment known as a pākē kārure was made of two-ply closed strands of hukahuka (twisted or rolled cord or tag) interspersed with occasional black-dyed two-ply open type kārure (loosely twisted) muka thread cord. Garments such as these were worn interchangeably either around the waist as a piupiu, or across the shoulder as a cape. These types of garments are thought to pre-date European contact, later becoming a more specialised form during the mid-to-later nineteenth century, which continues today in the standardised form of the piupiu.

=== Piupiu ===
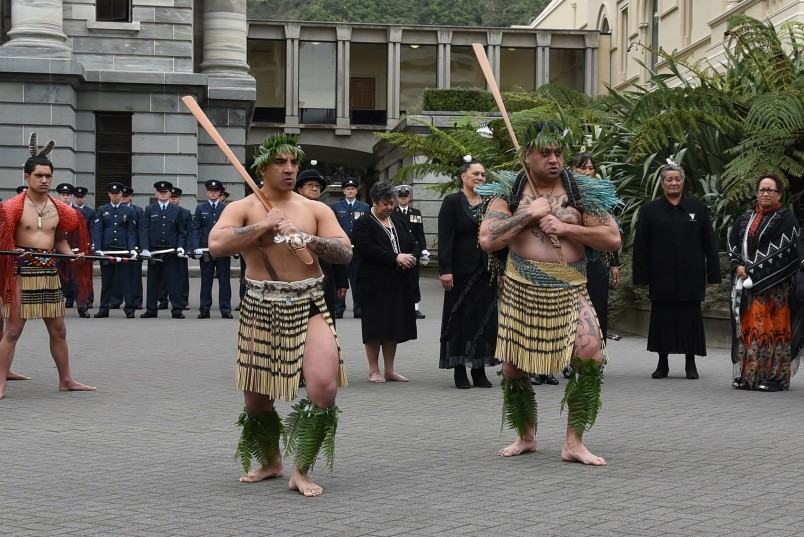
Piupiu worn at a ceremony at New Zealand Parliament. The swearing in of Dame Patsy Reddy as the Governor-General in 2016.

Piupiu are a modern Māori garment usually worn around the waist as a skirt and often forms part of the costume for Māori cultural performance, kapa haka. Piupiu came into prominence after contact with Europeans. Prior to piupiu were rāpaki and pākē kūrure which were 'garments of free-hanging strands'. The strands of the piupiu are usually made from the leaves of harakeke (flax) that are prepared to create a cylindrical strand with the muka (flax fibre) exposed in some sections to create geometric patterns. The waistband is often decorated with a tāniko pattern. The harakeke un-scraped cylindrical strands make a percussion sound when the wearer sways or moves. The geometric patterns are emphasised with dyeing as the dye soaks more into the exposed fibres rather than the dried raw leaf.

The first two captains of HMS New Zealand, a battlecruiser funded in 1911 by the government of New Zealand for the defence of the British Empire and which took an active part in three battles of the First World War, took into battle a piupiu (as well as a hei-tiki, Māori traditional pendant). The crew attributed to this the New Zealand being a "lucky ship" which sustained no casualties during the entire war. The piupiu went into the collection of the Torpedo Bay Navy Museum in Devonport, Auckland.

=== Fine cloaks / kākahu ===
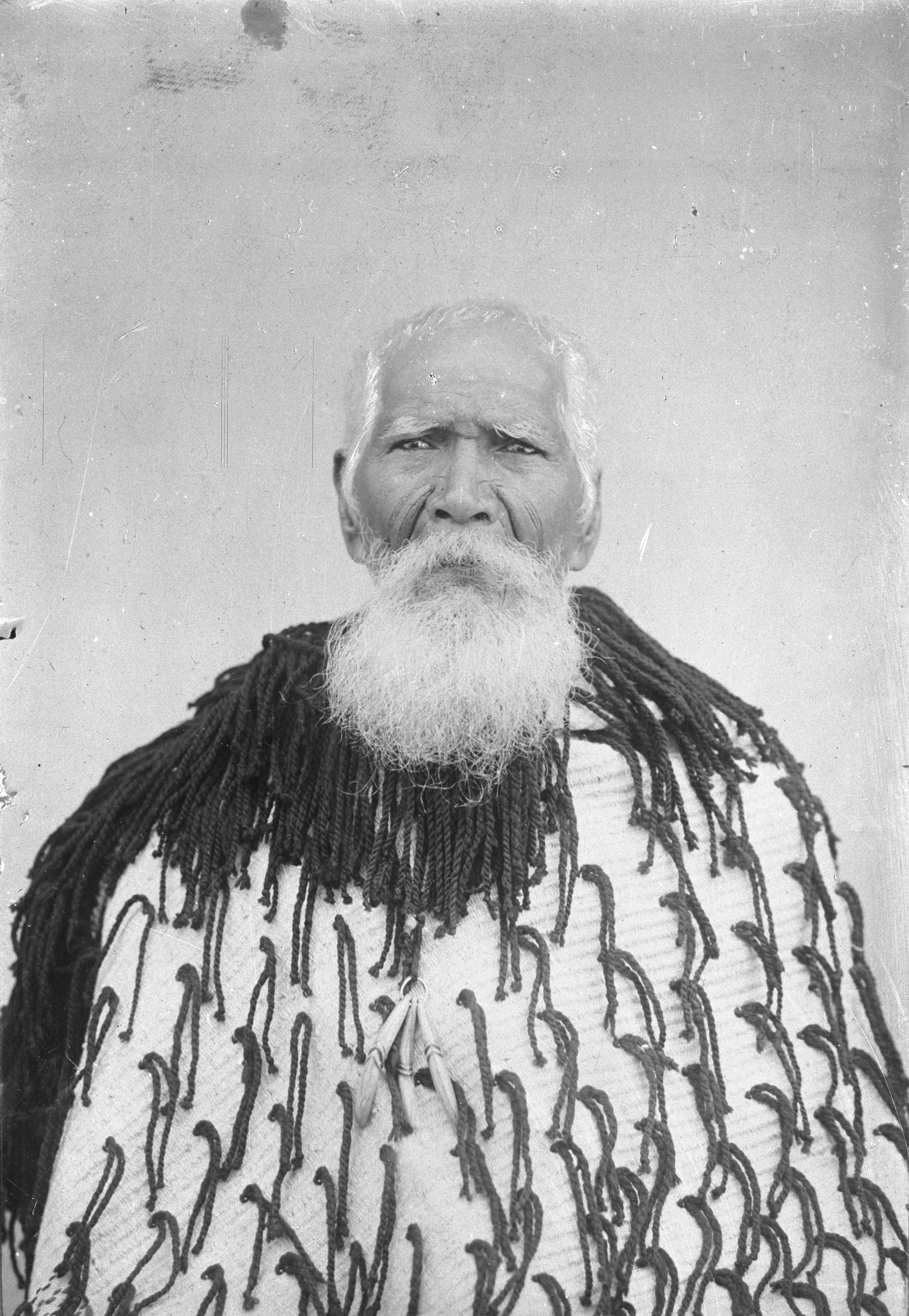
Cloak with tassels - korowai

There are a number of different types of fine cloaks including korowai (cloaks decorated with tags), kahu huruhuru (cloaks made with bird feathers) and kahu kurī (dog-skins cloaks). Kākahu are precious taonga of New Zealand and they exhibit intricate weaving work. Some kākahu may take years to make and are for people of rank. They are treasured, and have been sometimes exchanged for important items or services. In modern times, they are worn on special occasions, as part of some university graduations, and by important figures such as the reigning monarch.

Kākahu are created using downward finger-weaving weft twining techniques (whatu), primarily using two methods: aho pātahi (single-pair twining) using two intertwined threads, and aho rua (double-pair twining), using four. Aho pātahi was originally used to create fishing traps, and the technique was adopted for Kākahu and other soft garments. Aho rua is typically used to secure hukahuka ("tags") to the body of the cloak, typically rolled muka chords, feathers or dog skin.

==== Korowai ====
Korowai are finely woven cloaks covered with muka tassels (hukahuka). Hukahuka are made by the miro (twist thread) process of dyeing the muka (flax fibre) and rolling two bundles into a single cord which is then woven into the body of the cloak. There are many different types of korowai that are named depending on the type of hukahuka used as the decoration. Korowai kārure have tassels (hukahuka) that appear to be unravelling. Korowai ngore have hukahuka that look like pompoms and became the most popular form of korowai decoration following the importation of coloured wools. Korowai hihima had undyed tassels.

Korowai seem to have been rare at the time of Captain Cook's first visit to New Zealand, as they do not appear in drawings made by his artists. But by 1844, when George French Angas painted historical accounts of early New Zealand, korowai with their black hukahuka had become the most popular style. Hukahuka on fine examples of korowai were often up to thirty centimetres long and when made correctly would move freely with every movement of the wearer. Today, many old korowai have lost their black hukahuka due to the dyeing process speeding up the deterioration of the muka.

In English, the term is often used to describe other kinds of kākahu, even if they do not have hukahuka made of muka.

==== Kaitaka ====
Kaitaka (also known as parawai in the Whanganui district) are cloaks of finely woven muka (Phormium tenax) fibre. Kaitaka are among the more prestigious forms of traditional Māori dress. They are made from muka (flax fibre), which is in turn made from those varieties of Phormium tenax that yield the finest quality fibre characterised by a silk-like texture and rich golden sheen. Kaitaka are usually adorned with broad tāniko borders at the remu (bottom) and narrow tāniko bands along the kauko (sides). The ua (upper border) is plain and undecorated, and the kaupapa (main body) is usually unadorned. There are several sub-categories of kaitaka: parawai, where the aho (wefts) run horizontally; kaitaka paepaeroa, where the aho run vertically; kaitaka aronui or pātea, where the aho run horizontally with tāniko bands on the sides and bottom borders; huaki, where the aho run horizontally with tāniko bands on the sides and two broad tāniko bands, one above the other, on the lower border; and huaki paepaeroa, which has vertical aho with double tāniko bands on the lower border.

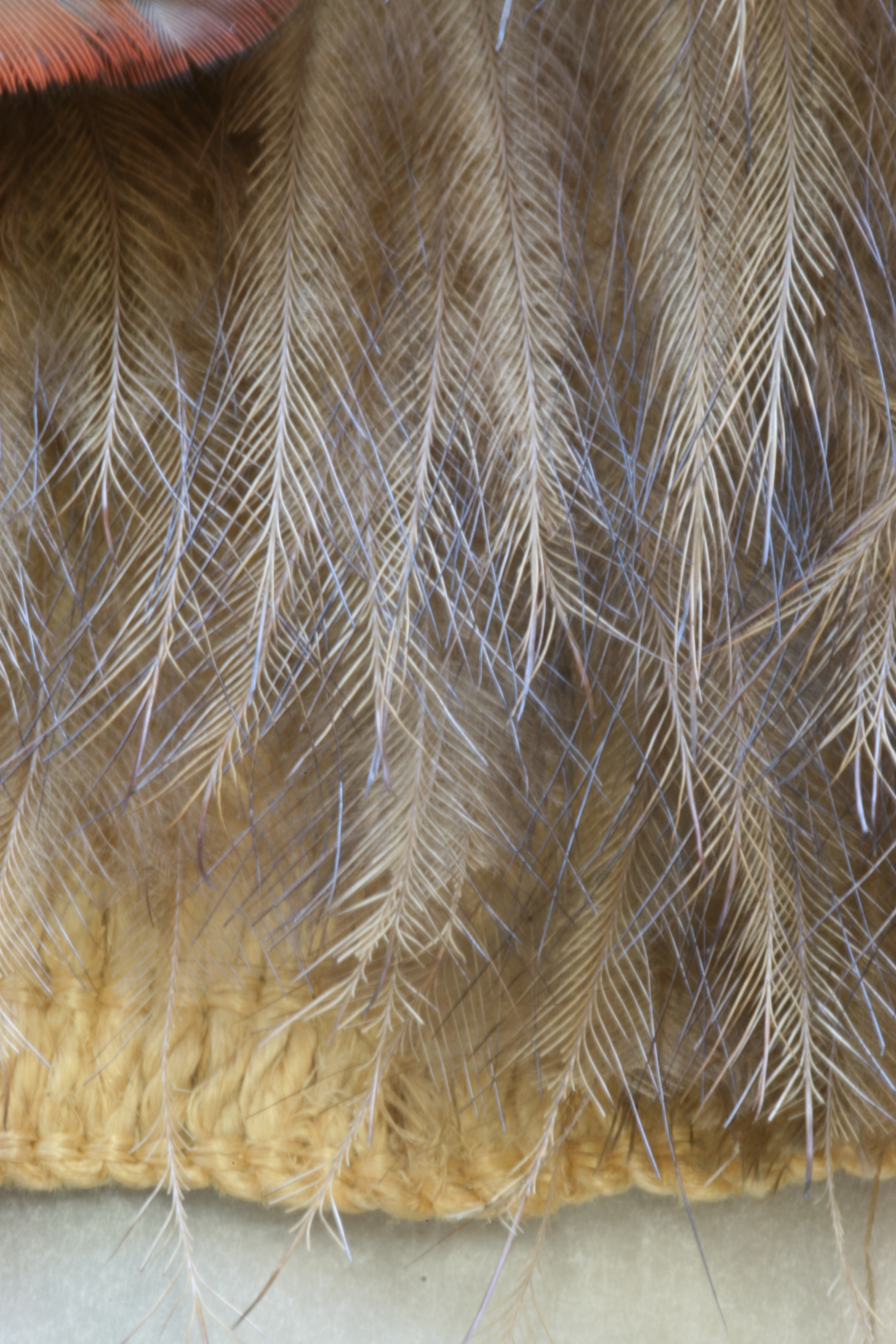
Detail of the bottom edge of a kahu kiwi, showing the distinctive hair-like nature of the kiwi feathers.

==== Kahu huruhuru ====
Fine feather cloaks called kahu huruhuru were made of muka fibre with bird feathers woven in to cover the entire cloak. These feather cloaks became more common between 1850 and 1900, when cloaks were evolving in their production. Some early examples include kahu kiwi (kiwi feather cloak), which used the soft brown feathers of the kiwi (Apteryx spp). Kahu kiwi were regarded as the most prestigious form of kahu huruhuru. Other kahu huruhuru incorporated the green and white feathers of the kererū (New Zealand pigeon: Hemiphaga novaeseelandiae) and blue feathers from the tūī (Prosthemadera novaeseelandiae).

==== Kahu kurī ====
The most prestigious pre-European cloak is the kahu kurī, made from dog skin from the now extinct kurī (Māori dog). They were prized heirlooms. Kurī are thought to have belonged to chiefs, and their pelts also had status. Sometimes kahu kurī were traded, giving mana across both parties. The Museum of New Zealand Te Papa Tongarewa and other museums have some of these rare cloaks in their collections. Kahu kurī were made largely between 1500 and 1850, and it is thought that production had ceased altogether by the early nineteenth century. There are three different construction techniques for these cloaks: one where the whole dog skins were sewn together; one made from the dog tails tufted together called a kahu waero; and one with woven strips of hide. Some of the names for the types of kahu kurī include tōpuni, ihupuni, awarua, kahuwaero, māhiti, and pūahi.

== Notable Māori weavers ==
Traditional Māori weaving was maintained during colonisation, however as European materials were utilised and adapted for use in traditional weaving, many traditional techniques for processing native fibres were in decline during the early 20th century. The craft suffered during urbanisation that occurred in the 1950s when Māori migrated from marae-based rural areas to cities, however it was through the efforts of a few Māori women and the Māori Women's Welfare League that the arts of weaving and knowledge from Te Whare Pora were preserved and widely passed on, when the league began offering weaving classes. This included expertise being taught across iwi and hapū boundaries, and taught in both a traditional way and also in training courses.

A national weaving school was set up in 1969, which contributed to the weaving revival and there have been a handful of important exhibitions of weaving work that have profiled the skill, cultural importance and artistry of Māori weavers. These efforts that started with notable weavers such as Rangimārie Hetet, Diggeress Te Kanawa and Cath Brown continued through to the 1980s and became part of the Māori renaissance. Te Roopu Raranga Whatu o Aotearoa, the national New Zealand collective for traditional weavers, was established in 1983, which organises national hui and regional workshops to promote traditional weaving.

Some notable weavers include:

- Rangimārie Hetet (1892–1995)
- Diggeress Te Kanawa (1920–2009)
- Cath Brown (1933–2004)
- Erenora Peketapu-Hetet (1941–2006)
- Veranoa Hetet (born 1966)
- Donna Campbell (artist) (born 1959)
- Judy Hohaia
- Ngaahina Hohaia (born 1975)
- Reihana Parata
- Kahutoi Te Kanawa (born 1960)
- Saana Murray (1925–2011)
- Te Pairi Tuterangi (died 1954)
- Emily Schuster (1927–1997)
- Riria Smith (1935–2012)
- Sonia Snowden (born 1946)
- Te Wharetoroa Tiniraupeka (1863–1964)

In 2021 three weavers Jacqueline McRae-Tarei, Gloria Taituha and Rose Te Ratana became the first to receive a joint doctorate in 'mahi raranga' (weaving work) awarded through Te Wānanga o Aotearoa, in partnership with Auckland University of Technology's Te Ipukarea Research Centre. Each of them studied a different part of history, so the PhD operated separately, and then each part also informed each other and a whole with the period of study spanning the 1800s until 2021. The doctorate was supervised by Professor Tania Ka'ai.

== See also ==
- Kete (basket)
- Pōhā
