= Houhere =

Houhere is the Māori language name for a genus of plants called Hoheria or lacebark, and may refer to the following plants from New Zealand:

- Hoheria angustifolia, narrow-leaved houhere
- Hoheria equitum, Poor Knight's houhere
- Hoheria glabrata, mountain ribbonwood
- Hoheria populnea, houhere
- Hoheria sexstylosa, long-leaved lacebark
