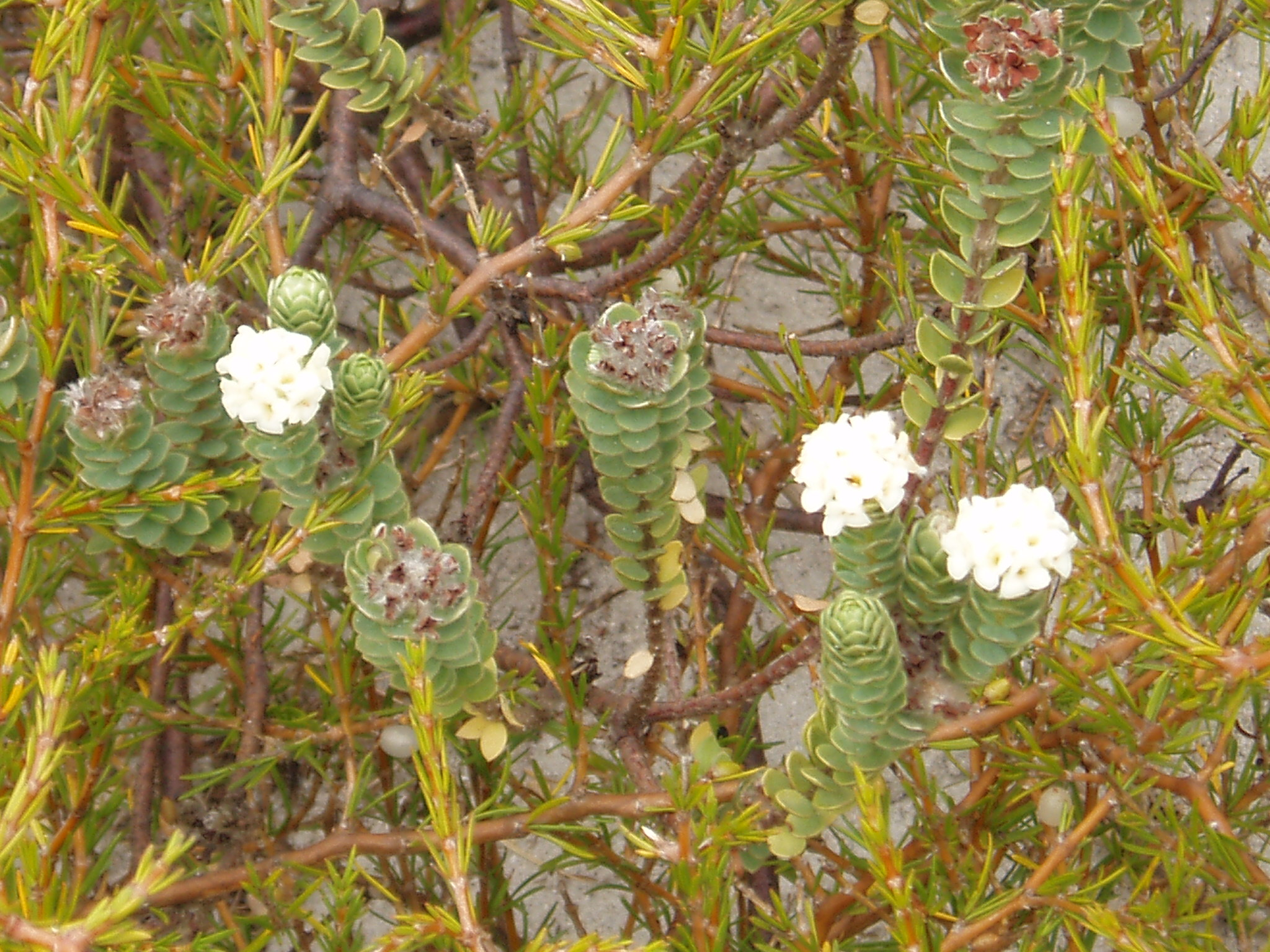
- Pimelea villosa at Puwheke Beach, Karikari Peninsula

Scientific classification
- Kingdom: Plantae
- Clade: Tracheophytes
- Clade: Angiosperms
- Clade: Eudicots
- Clade: Rosids
- Order: Malvales
- Family: Thymelaeaceae
- Genus: Pimelea
- Species: P. villosa

Binomial name
- Pimelea villosa Sol. ex Sm.

Synonyms
- Pimelea arenaria

= Pimelea villosa =

Species of shrub

Pimelea villosa, also known as Pimelea arenaria, or sand daphne is a species of shrub in the family Thymelaeaceae, known in Māori as autetaranga or autetauranga. It is endemic to New Zealand. Its conservation status puts it at risk and declining, as determined by the New Zealand Threat Classification System (NZTCS). The bark of the tree was occasionally used as traditional textiles such as ribbons or ear ornaments, however was not as commonly used as the paper mulberry (aute) or Hoheria populnea (houhere).

== Description ==
Pimelea villosa is a sprawling shrub with hairy branches. It is found almost exclusively on sand dunes and associated areas. It possesses pointed leaves that are 5 to 15 mm long and 3 to 7 mm wide. It also has white flowers and black, red, pink or white fruit.It is classified as at risk or declining there is only one natural place it remains, at Otaki beach where around 20 plants naturally remain.

== Nomenclature ==
This plant was for many years known as Pimelea arenaria, a name published by Allan Cunningham in 1833. However, in 2009 it was pointed out by Burrows that Pimelea villosa, a name proposed by Daniel Solander but not published by him, had been effectively published by James Edward Smith in 1814, and thus has priority.

In the same paper, Burrows proposed to divide P. villosa into two subspecies, P. villosa subsp. villosa and P. villosa subsp. arenaria, basing the latter on Cunningham's specimens. This division remains controversial and is not accepted by some authorities.

The name P. villosa was also applied illegitimately by some nineteenth century authors to an Australian plant, Pimelea longiflora.
