= Mountain lacebark =

Mountain lacebark may refer to two New Zealand trees in the mallow family:-

- Hoheria glabrata
- Hoheria lyallii
