= Sonia Snowden =

New Zealand weaver

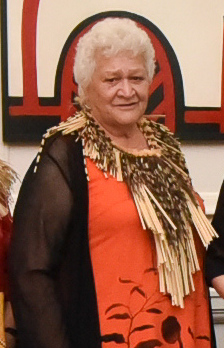
- Born: 1946 (age 79–80); New Zealand
- Known for: weaving

Sonia Armana Snowden (born 1946) is a New Zealand Māori tohunga raranga (master weaver) who tutored in arts and weaving at Te Wananga o Raukawa. She identifies with the Ngāpuhi iwi. Her works are held in the collection of Museum of New Zealand Te Papa Tongarewa (Te Papa).

== Biography ==
The small community of Waikare, in the far north of New Zealand is where Snowden grew up.

Snowden learnt her craft from such distinguished weavers as Ramari Ropata, Emily Schuster, Erenora Puketapu-Hetet, Aromea Tahiwi, and Nellie Frost. She started weaving in the early 1980s and is known for the use of fine strands of natural fibres from harakeke, pīngao and kiekie. In 2001, after the Rangiatea Church was damaged by fire, Snowden supervised a group of weavers replicating the tukutuku panels of the church for its restoration. In 2013 Snowden was part of a group of weavers whose work was displayed at the United Nations General Assembly Building. In 2016 a New Zealand stamp was issued showing a kete created by Snowden and held at Te Papa. Snowden gained formal acknowledgement of her master weaver status when in 2018 she was appointed to the Ngā Kahui Whiritoi of Te Roopu Raranga Whatu o Aotearoa. In 2019 Snowden was awarded the Ngā Tohu ā tā Kingi Ihaka award recognising her lifetime of contributions to Māori arts.

Snowden has passed on her knowledge as a tutor for many years at Te Wānanga o Raukawa, a Māori university in Ōtaki.

== Notable works ==
Te Papa holds the 'Matariki' tukutuku panel, woven by Snowden, in their permanent collection. It was woven from kiekie, raupõ, kakaho (the flower of the toetoe) and pingaoto and was created to celebrate Matariki. Te Papa is also the custodian of a kete created by Snowden and named Tatai Whetu ki te Rangi. Another taonga created by Snowden and held by Te Papa is the hieke or raincape she created in March 2000. This is made from neinei.

== Exhibitions ==
- Toi Maori: The Eternal International touring exhibition, 2005—7
- Toi Whakarākai: Ngā Aho o te Whenua Mahara Gallery 2020
- Toi Matarau Māoriland Film Festival, Toi Matarau Gallery, Māoriland Ōtaki 2020-2021
- Te Wānanga o Raukawa, Toi Matarau Gallery, Māoriland Ōtaki 2020
- Te Kahui o Matariki, Toi Matarau Gallery, Māoriland Ōtaki 2020
- Kāpiti Arts Trail, Toi Matarau Gallery, Māoriland Ōtaki 2020
- Ngā Aho Whenua, inaugural weavers residency, Toi Matarau Gallery, Māoriland Ōtaki 2021-22
- Tiaho Mai: Creative Kāpiti Gallery, Matariki Ramaroa Festival Paraparaumu 2021
- Whiti Ora: Toi Matarau Gallery, Matariki Ramaroa Festival Ōtaki 2021
- Te Ringa Māhorahora: Toi Matarau Gallery Ōtaki 2021-22
- Te Puna Waiora: Distinguished Weavers of Te Kāhui Whiritoi, Te Puna o Waiwhetū Christchurch City Art Gallery Otautahi 2021-22
- Whiriwhiria: Toi Māori Gallery, Te Whanganui a Tara 2022
