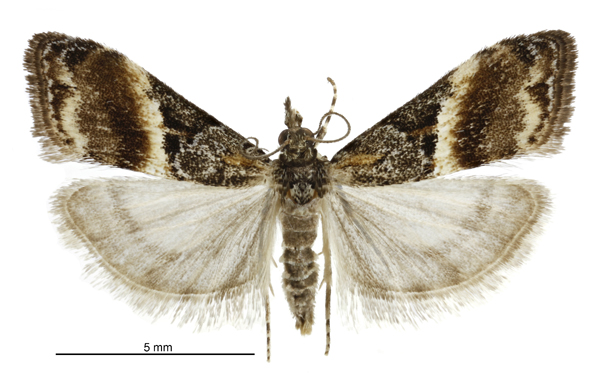
- Female

Scientific classification
- Kingdom: Animalia
- Phylum: Arthropoda
- Class: Insecta
- Order: Lepidoptera
- Family: Crambidae
- Genus: Eudonia
- Species: E. chlamydota

Binomial name
- Eudonia chlamydota (Meyrick, 1884)

Synonyms
- Scoparia chlamydota Meyrick, 1884

= Eudonia chlamydota =

Species of moth endemic to New Zealand

Eudonia chlamydota is a moth in the family Crambidae. It was named by Edward Meyrick in 1884. It is endemic to New Zealand and is found in the North and South Islands. This species inhabits native forests at up to 3000 ft. Larvae feed on moss, building a silken shelter at the base of the plant from which to feed. They pupate in a cocoon within that shelter. Adults are on the wing commonly from December until February but have also been observed in the New Zealand winter. They are known to frequent Hoheria lyallii and are attracted to light.

== Taxonomy ==
This species was named Scoparia chlamydota by Edward Meyrick in 1884. Meyrick gave a detailed description of the adult moth in 1885. George Hudson discussed and illustrated this species in his 1928 publication The butterflies and moths of New Zealand. In 1988 John S. Dugdale placed this species in the genus Eudonia. The male holotype specimen, collected at Arthur's Pass at 910 m (3,000 ft), is held at the Natural History Museum, London.

== Description ==
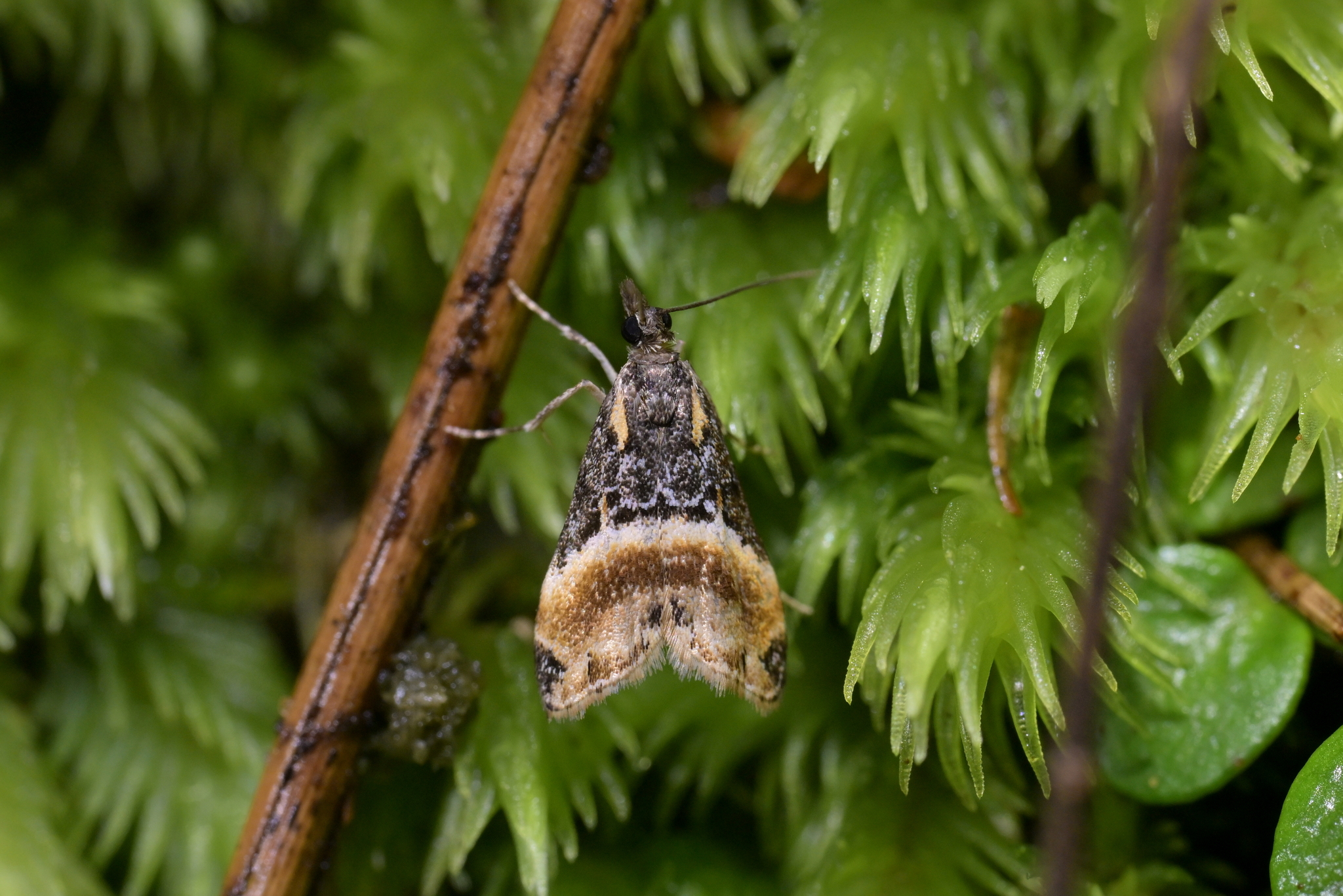
E. chlamydota on moss

Meyrick described this species as follows:

Male, female—13–14 mm. Head, palpi, and thorax whitish-ochreous suffused with black; palpi 2. Antenne greyish-ochreous; ciliations 1/2. Abdomen ochreous-whitish. Legs ochreous-white, tibie and tarsi banded with dark fuscous. Forewings triangular, costa slightly arched, apex rounded, hindmargin straight, oblique; ochreous-whitish; basal half, bounded by a line parallel to hindmargin, suffused with blackish, except on an oval ochreous spot near middle of base; a moderately broad fascia-like reddish-ochreous suffusion rather beyond and parallel to posterior edge of blackish patch; an irregular reddish-ochreous suffusion towards middle of hindmargin; a rather small triangular blackish spot on costa before apex, and some blackish scales on anal angle: cilia ochreous-whitish, mixed with reddish ochreous beneath and blackish above apex. Hindwings 1 1/4, whitish; postmedian line and apical suffusion faintly grey; cilia whitish.

The adults are variable in the depth of colour on their wings.

== Distribution ==
This species is endemic to New Zealand. It is found in the North and South Islands.

== Habitat and hosts ==
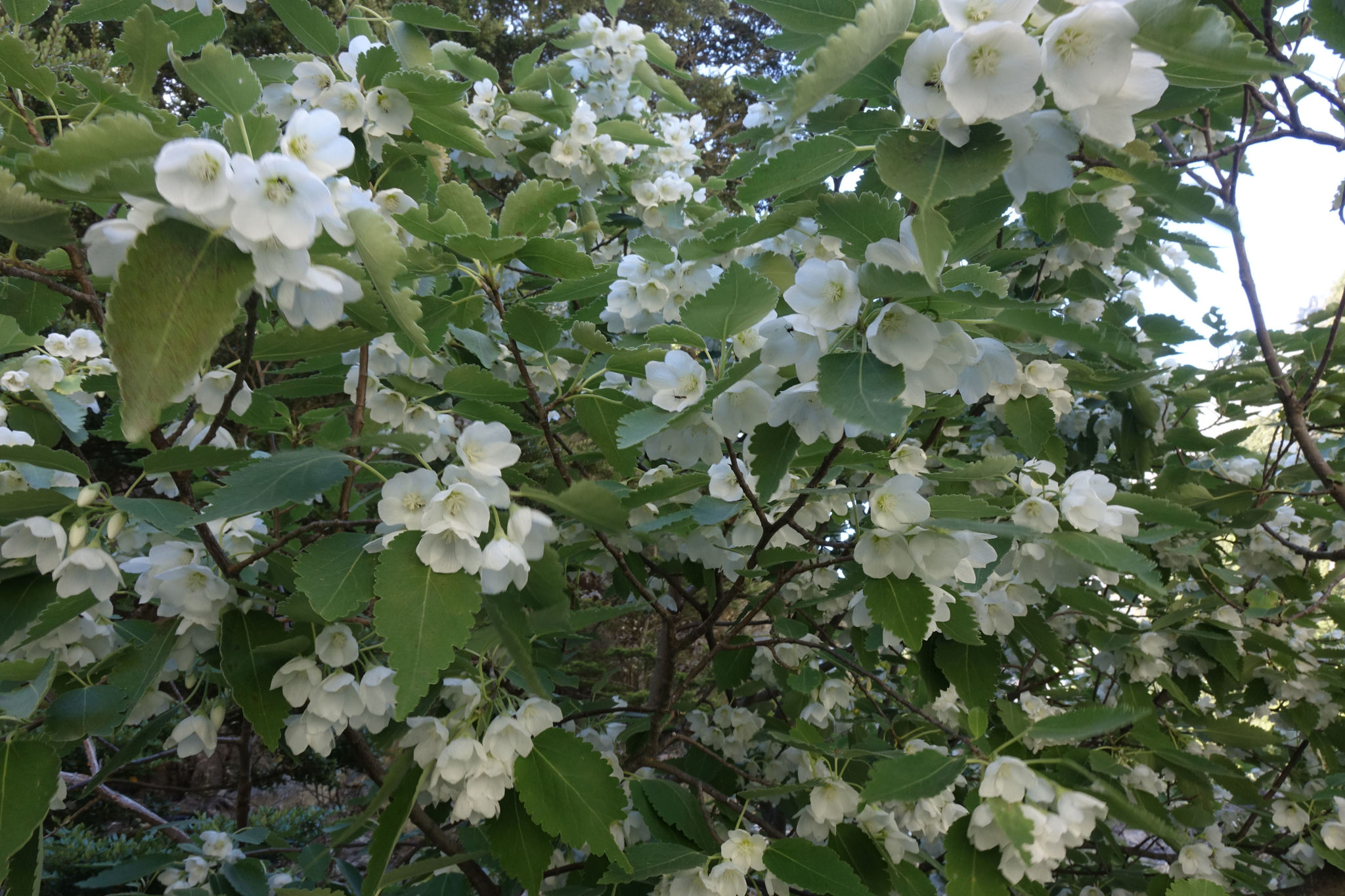
Hoheria lyallii.

This species inhabits native forest up to around 3000 ft in altitude. Adults have been observed frequenting Hoheria lyallii at the edges of forest near rivers. Larvae feed on moss species building a shelter made of silk at the base of the plant. The larvae pupate within a cocoon in their host plant.

== Behaviour ==
Adults of this species are on the wing most commonly from December until February although it has been observed in the New Zealand winter. They are attracted to light.
