= Te Wharetoroa Tiniraupeka =

New Zealand Māori weaver

Te Wharetoroa Tiniraupeka (August 1863 – 29 May 1964), also known as Margaret Graham, was a New Zealand Māori weaver.

== Personal life ==
Tiniraupeka was born and raised near Rotorua in the Bay of Plenty region of New Zealand. She was part of the Ngāti Whakaue and Te Arawa iwi. Tiniraupeka was among the survivors of the 1886 eruption of Mount Tarawera.

Tiniraupeka was an adherent of the Ringatū religion, and in 1913 arranged the construction of Tiki, a prayer house in Ohinemutu, which remains standing as of 2021. Tiniraupeka was an associate of Te Kooti, the religion's founder and a Māori guerrilla, and later claimed to be the only person who knew where his body had been buried.

As an adult, in the early twentieth century Tiniraupeka was the partner of the New Zealand ethnographer George Graham, during which time she was also known by the English name Margaret. She lived between Ohinemutu, Ngongotahā and Wainui. Tiniraupeka died in 1964 at the age of 101, and was buried in Wainui. She was survived by her niece, Hilda Inia.

== Theft and recovery of kahu waero ==
At some point during the 1890s and the 1900s, Tiniraupeka weaved a kahu waero, a rare type of cloak, made out of dog hair. Tiniraupeka was known to own many taonga, and operated for a time a curiosity shop. In 1909, the kahu waero was stolen from Tiniraupeka's possession, alongside other taonga she had created or otherwise obtained. In 1921, the kahu waero was located on display at the Dominion Museum in Wellington by Tiniraupeka and Graham, which had purchased it shortly after it was stolen. After six months of correspondence between the museum, Tiniraupeka, and Graham, the kahu waero was recovered, and after being initially stored at a lawyer's office in Auckland, it was put on display at the Auckland Museum at some point between 1927 and 1930.

At some point following the kahu waero's recovery, Tiniraupeka's relationship with Graham ended; in 1946, for unclear reasons, Graham's daughter removed the kahu waero from the museum's collection. The cloak was not returned to Tiniraupeka during her lifetime, despite enquiries made by her and her lawyers following Graham's death in 1952; unbeknownst to her, it had been sold to a Wellington-based jeweller.

Tiniraupeka died on 29 May 1964. In 1991, the kahu waero surfaced again when it was sold to the National Museum, (now Te Papa) in 1991 for $5000.It remains at the museum with the permission of Tiniraupeka's niece.
