= Judy Hohaia =

New Zealand Māori weaver

- Born: New Zealand
- Known for: Weaving

Judy Hohaia is a New Zealand Māori weaver from the Te Rārawa iwi. Her work is included in the permanent collection of Museum of New Zealand Te Papa Tongarewa.

In 1996, Hohaia collaborated with fellow weavers Joy Wikitera and Shona Tawhiao to found Takirua Weavers. The trio made and sold woven art and kete (baskets).

From 2003 to 2005 Hohaia and Tawhiao were employed to weave the front and back walls (the area between poupou and the kakaho panels) of the Unitec Institute of Technology Marae in Auckland.

Hohaia's work was part of the exhibition Toi Maori: The Eternal Thread, which toured the United States and New Zealand in 2007.
