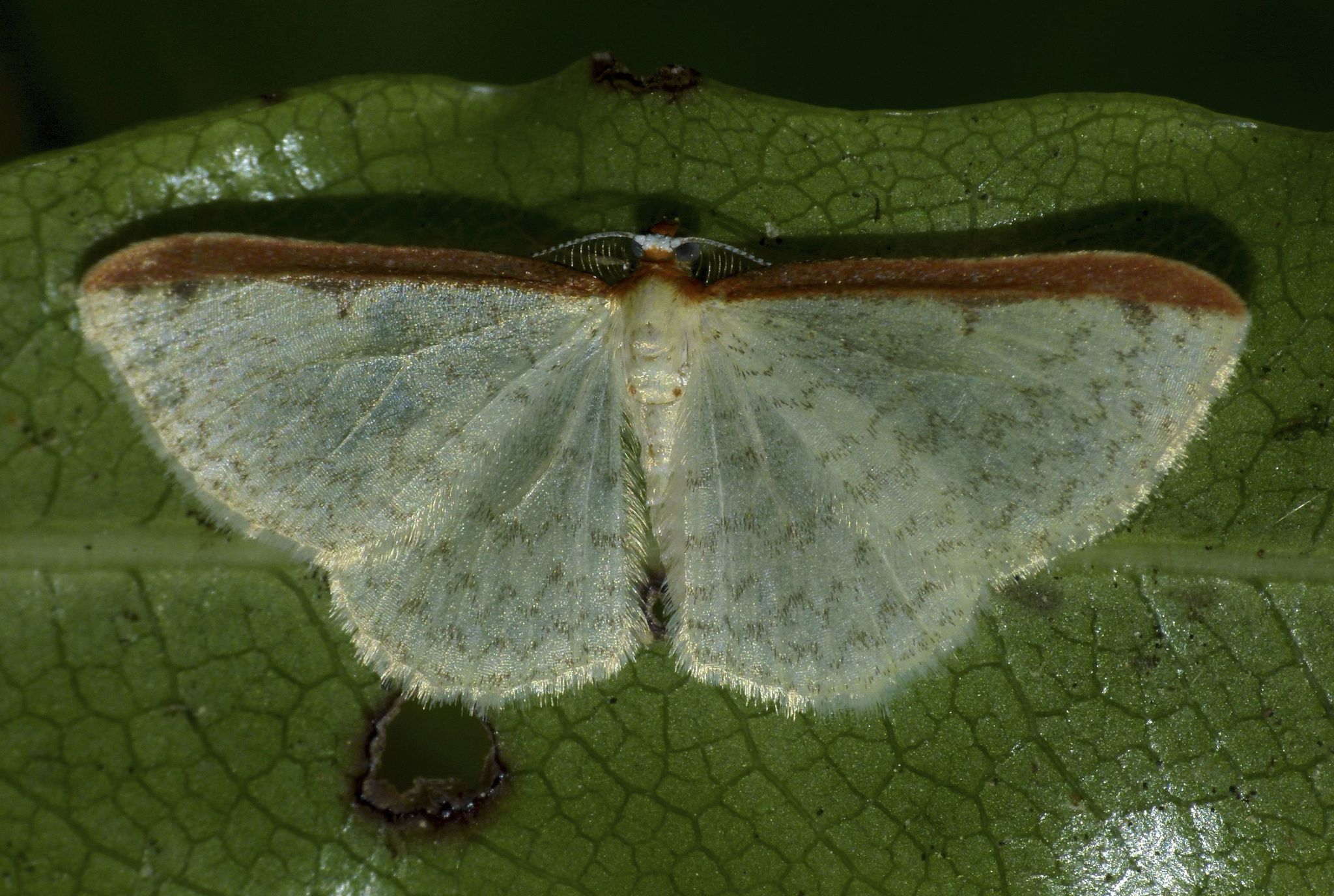
- Epiphryne undosata

Scientific classification
- Kingdom: Animalia
- Phylum: Arthropoda
- Class: Insecta
- Order: Lepidoptera
- Family: Geometridae
- Subfamily: Larentiinae
- Genus: Epiphryne; Meyrick, 1883

Synonyms
- Aulopola Meyrick, 1885; Hermione Meyrick, 1883; Pancyma Meyrick, 1885; Panopaea Meyrick, 1883

= Epiphryne =

Genus of moths

Epiphryne is a genus of moths in the family Geometridae erected by Edward Meyrick in 1883. All the species within this genus are endemic to New Zealand.

Species include:

- Epiphryne charidema
- Epiphryne undosata
- Epiphryne verriculata
- Epiphryne xanthaspis
