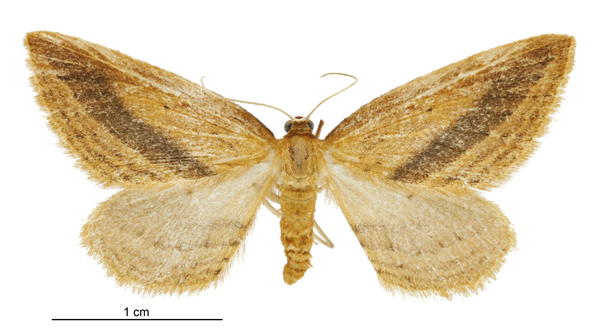
- Female
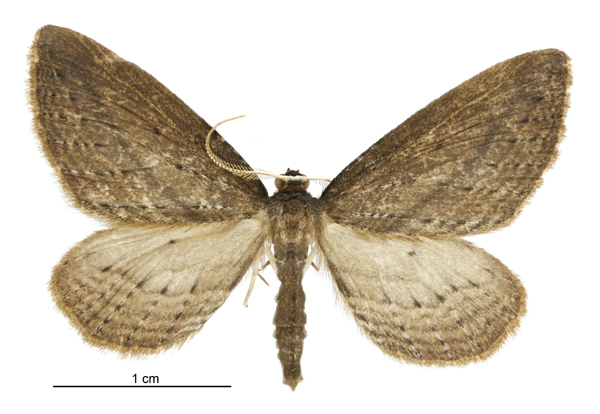
- Male

Scientific classification
- Kingdom: Animalia
- Phylum: Arthropoda
- Class: Insecta
- Order: Lepidoptera
- Family: Geometridae
- Genus: Epiphryne
- Species: E. charidema

Binomial name
- Epiphryne charidema (Meyrick, 1909)

Synonyms
- Venusia charidema Meyrick, 1909

= Epiphryne charidema =

Species of moth

Epiphryne charidema is a moth in the family Geometridae. It is endemic to New Zealand. This species was first described by Edward Meyrick in 1909. This species has two subspecies, Epiphryne charidema charidema and Epiphryne charidema autocharis.
