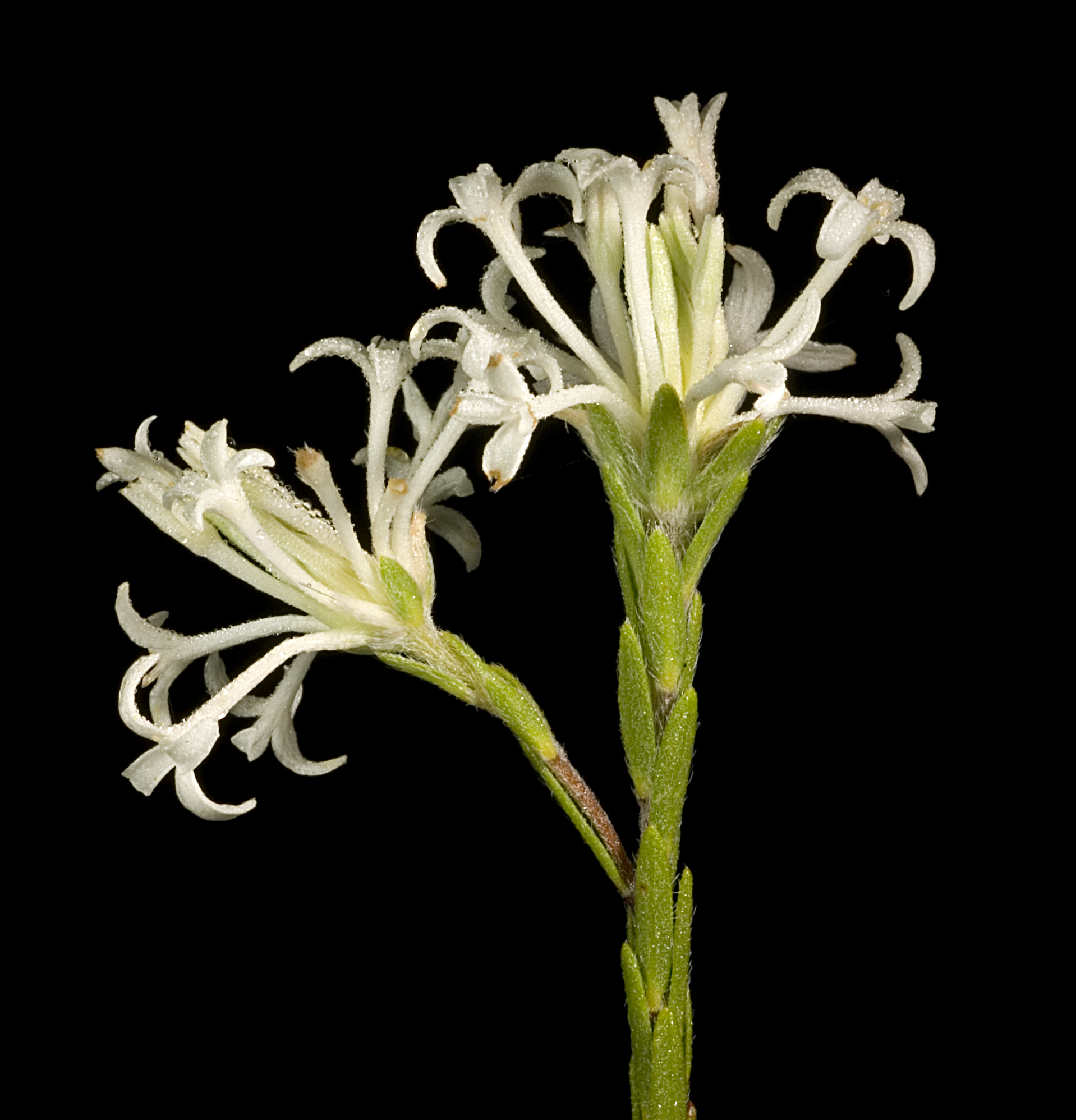

Scientific classification
- Kingdom: Plantae
- Clade: Embryophytes
- Clade: Tracheophytes
- Clade: Spermatophytes
- Clade: Angiosperms
- Clade: Eudicots
- Clade: Rosids
- Order: Malvales
- Family: Thymelaeaceae
- Genus: Pimelea
- Species: P. longiflora

Binomial name
- Pimelea longiflora R.Br.

Synonyms
- Banksia longiflora (R.Br.) Kuntze; Calyptrostegia longiflora (R.Br.) Endl.

= Pimelea longiflora =

Species of shrub

Pimelea longiflora is a species of flowering plant in the family Thymelaeaceae and is endemic to the southwest of Western Australia. It is an erect, spindly shrub with linear to narrowly elliptic leaves and erect clusters of white to cream-coloured flowers, surrounded by 4 to 6 green, egg-shaped involucral bracts.

== Description ==
Pimelea longiflora is an erect, spindly shrub that typically grows to a height of 0.3–1.3 m (1 ft 0 in – 4 ft 3 in) and has densely hairy young stems. The leaves are linear to narrowly elliptic, 4–18 mm (0.16–0.71 in) long and 1–3 mm (0.039–0.118 in) wide on a short petiole. The flowers are arranged in erect clusters of many flowers on a peduncle 2–20 mm (0.079–0.787 in) long, surrounded by 4 to 6 egg-shaped or narrowly egg-shaped involucral bracts that are 5–12 mm (0.20–0.47 in) long and 1.5–3 mm (0.059–0.118 in) wide. Each flower is on a pedicel 0.4–0.5 mm (0.016–0.020 in) long, the floral tube 7–12 mm (0.28–0.47 in) long, and the sepals 5–6 mm (0.20–0.24 in) long. Flowering occurs from August to February.

== Taxonomy ==
Pimelea longiflora was first formally described in 1810 by Robert Brown in his book Prodromus Florae Novae Hollandiae et Insulae Van Diemen. The specific epithet (longiflora) means "long-flowered".

== Distribution and habitat ==
This pimelea usually grows in swampy, winter-wet places in sand or sandy clay, mainly between Bunbury and Cape Riche, with a disjunct population in the Fitzgerald River National Park, in the Avon Wheatbelt, Esperance Plains, Jarrah Forest, Swan Coastal Plain and Warren bioregions of south-western Western Australia.

== Conservation status ==
Pimelea longiflora is listed as "not threatened" by the Government of Western Australia Department of Biodiversity, Conservation and Attractions.
