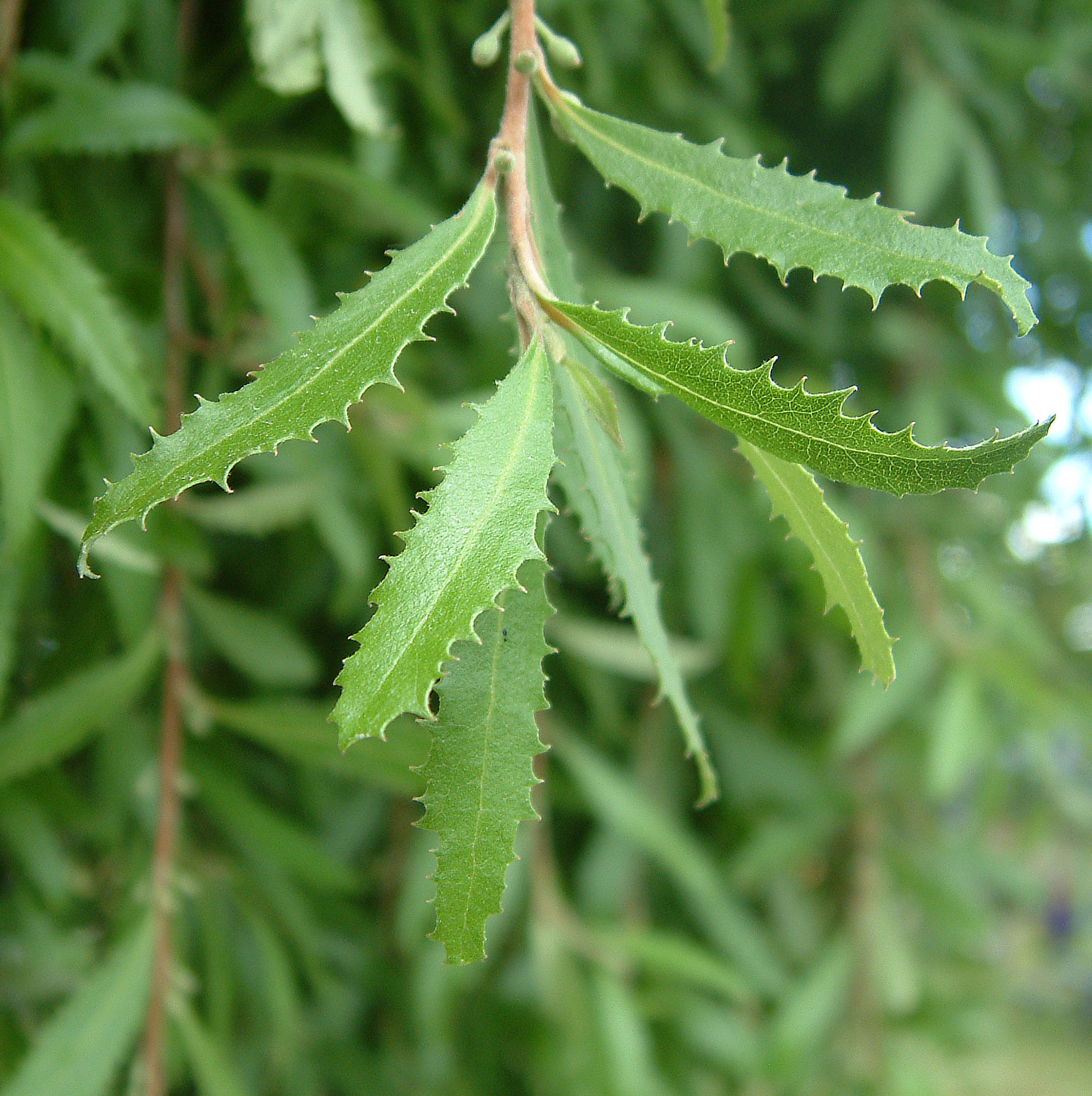

Scientific classification
- Kingdom: Plantae
- Clade: Tracheophytes
- Clade: Angiosperms
- Clade: Eudicots
- Clade: Rosids
- Order: Malvales
- Family: Malvaceae
- Genus: Hoheria
- Species: H. angustifolia

Binomial name
- Hoheria angustifolia Raoul

= Hoheria angustifolia =

Narrow-leaved lacebark

Species of flowering plant

Hoheria angustifolia, the narrow-leaved lacebark or narrow-leaved houhere, is a species of flowering plant in the family Malvaceae, endemic to New Zealand. It is an evergreen tree or shrub with a weeping habit and grows to 10 m (33 ft) tall. Known as houhere or houhi in Māori, the bark of the tree was occasionally used for traditional textiles, similar to the traditional use of Hoheria populnea.

It is commonly described in literature with a diameter at breast height (DBH) of up to 30 centimetres (12 in), but botanist Hugh Wilson found a specimen in Hinewai Reserve with a DBH of 130 centimetres (51 in). It has grey-green to dark green leaves, and white flowers from December to February. It has a divaricating small leaved habit while young until it gets to about 2 m (7 ft) high. The adult leaves are narrow and coarsely toothed hence the common name of narrow-leaved lacebark. Distribution is larger than any of the other lacebark species and can be found mostly in the eastern South Island, and in the North Island from Taranaki down.

== Etymology ==
Hoheria is derived from the Māori vernacular name for this genus, houhere or hoihere.

Angustifolia means 'with narrow leaves'.
