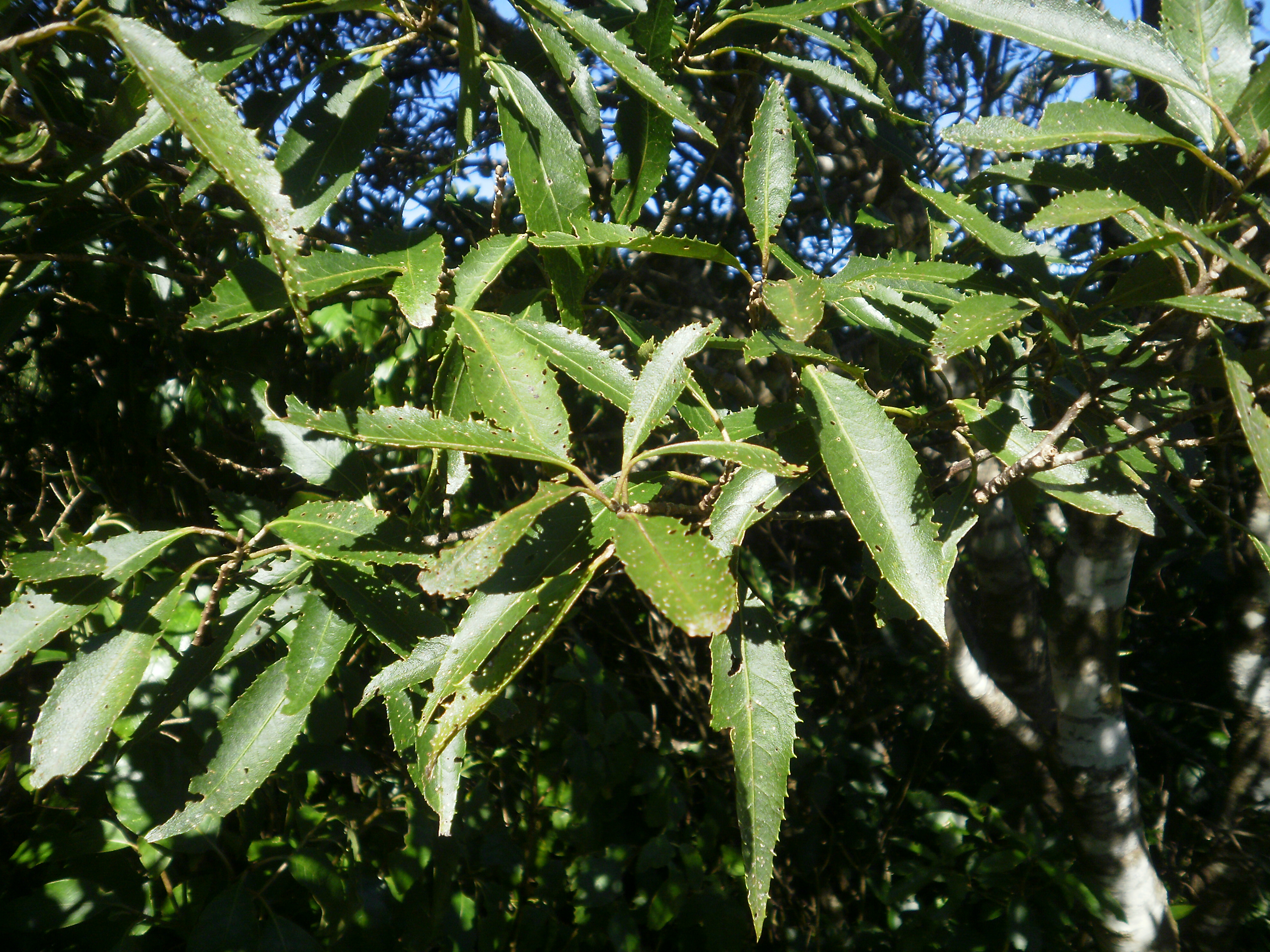

Scientific classification
- Kingdom: Plantae
- Clade: Tracheophytes
- Clade: Angiosperms
- Clade: Eudicots
- Clade: Rosids
- Order: Malvales
- Family: Malvaceae
- Genus: Hoheria
- Species: H. sexstylosa

Binomial name
- Hoheria sexstylosa Colenso

= Hoheria sexstylosa =

Species of flowering plant

Hoheria sexstylosa, the long-leaved lacebark or ribbonwood, is a species of flowering plant in the family Malvaceae, endemic to New Zealand. It is an evergreen tree or shrub growing to 8 m (26 ft) tall by 6 m (20 ft) broad with glossy green leaves, and white flowers in summer and autumn. The Latin specific epithet sexstylosa means "six styles".

In cultivation it is frost-hardy but requires a protected site. The cultivar 'Stardust' has gained the Royal Horticultural Society's Award of Garden Merit.

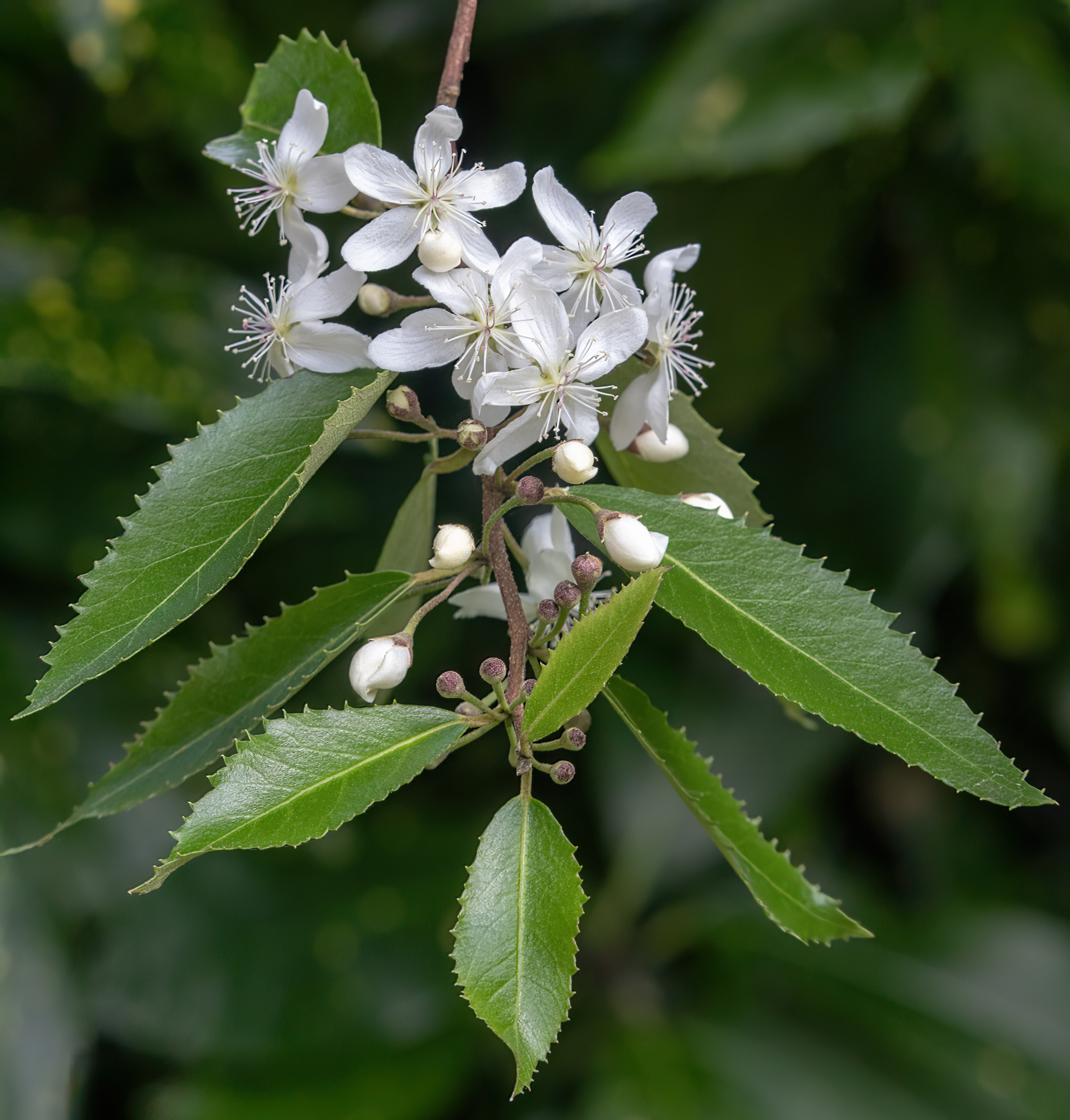
Hoheria sexstylosa, Ribbonwood.

== Distribution ==
Distribution in the North Island is from Waikato and the Coromandel Peninsula south to Wellington, while in the South Island natural populations appear to be in North West Nelson, inland Marlborough and the Banks Peninsula. Other populations may be naturalised.
