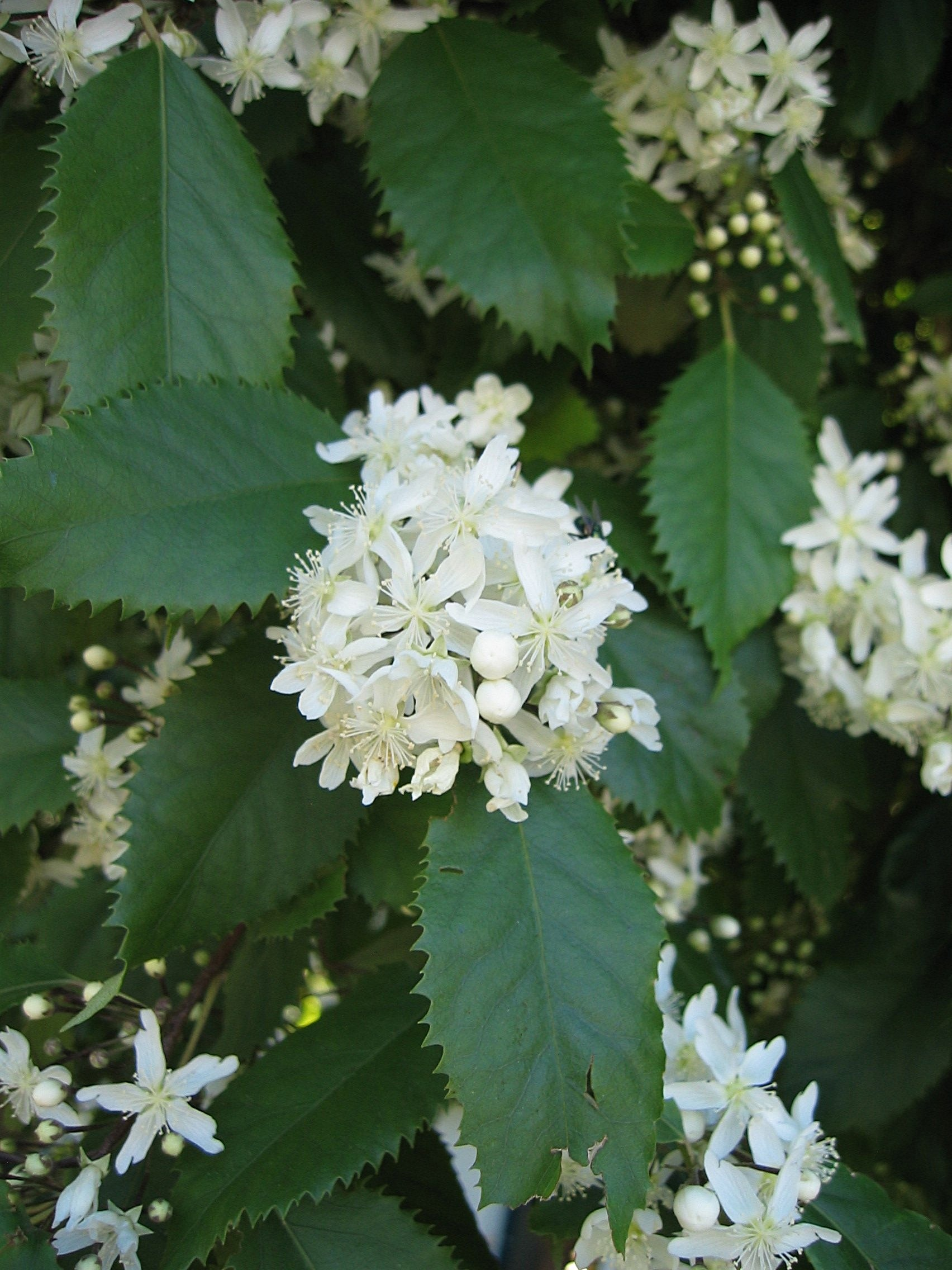
- Hoheria populnea

Scientific classification
- Kingdom: Plantae
- Clade: Tracheophytes
- Clade: Angiosperms
- Clade: Eudicots
- Clade: Rosids
- Order: Malvales
- Family: Malvaceae
- Subfamily: Malvoideae
- Tribe: Malveae
- Genus: Hoheria; A.Cunn.

Species
- See text

= Hoheria =

Genus of trees

Hoheria is a genus of six species of flowering plants in the family Malvaceae. All are endemic to New Zealand. The genus name is a Latinization of the Māori language name, houhere. That name, as well as lacebark and ribbonwood, are often used as common names. The name lacebark comes from the lace-like fibrous inner bark layer.

Hoheria are mostly evergreen, with Hoheria glabrata (mountain ribbonwood) a deciduous species. They are large shrubs or small trees growing 6–10 m (20–33 ft) tall, bearing large quantities of fragrant, 5-petalled white flowers in summer or autumn. The flowers are attractive to butterflies. They are borne in axils on jointed peduncles and produce hard, dry seed capsules. The leaves are serrate to dentate and ovate to lanceolate in shape. Juvenile foliage may persist on young plants for several years, and may have a metallic cast.

Some species are cultivated in New Zealand and Great Britain as ornamental plants. H. sexstylosa withstands temperatures down to −15 °C (5 °F), and H. glabrata has good frost tolerance. Numerous cultivars have been developed for use in gardens, of which the hybrid 'Glory of Amlwch' has gained the Royal Horticultural Society's Award of Garden Merit.

== Species ==
Seven species are accepted.

- Hoheria angustifolia Raoul – narrow-leaved lacebark or narrow-leaved houhere
- Hoheria equitum Heads – Poor Knights houhere
- Hoheria glabrata Sprague & Summerh. – mountain lacebark or mountain ribbonwood
- Hoheria lyallii Hook.f – mountain lacebark
- Hoheria ovata G.Simpson & J.S.Thomson
- Hoheria populnea A.Cunn – New Zealand mallow, lacebark or houhere
- Hoheria × sexangusta Allan (H. populnea × H. sexstylosa)
- Hoheria sexstylosa Colenso – long-leaved lacebark or long-leaved ribbonwood
