= Kete (basket) =

Māori woven carrying basket

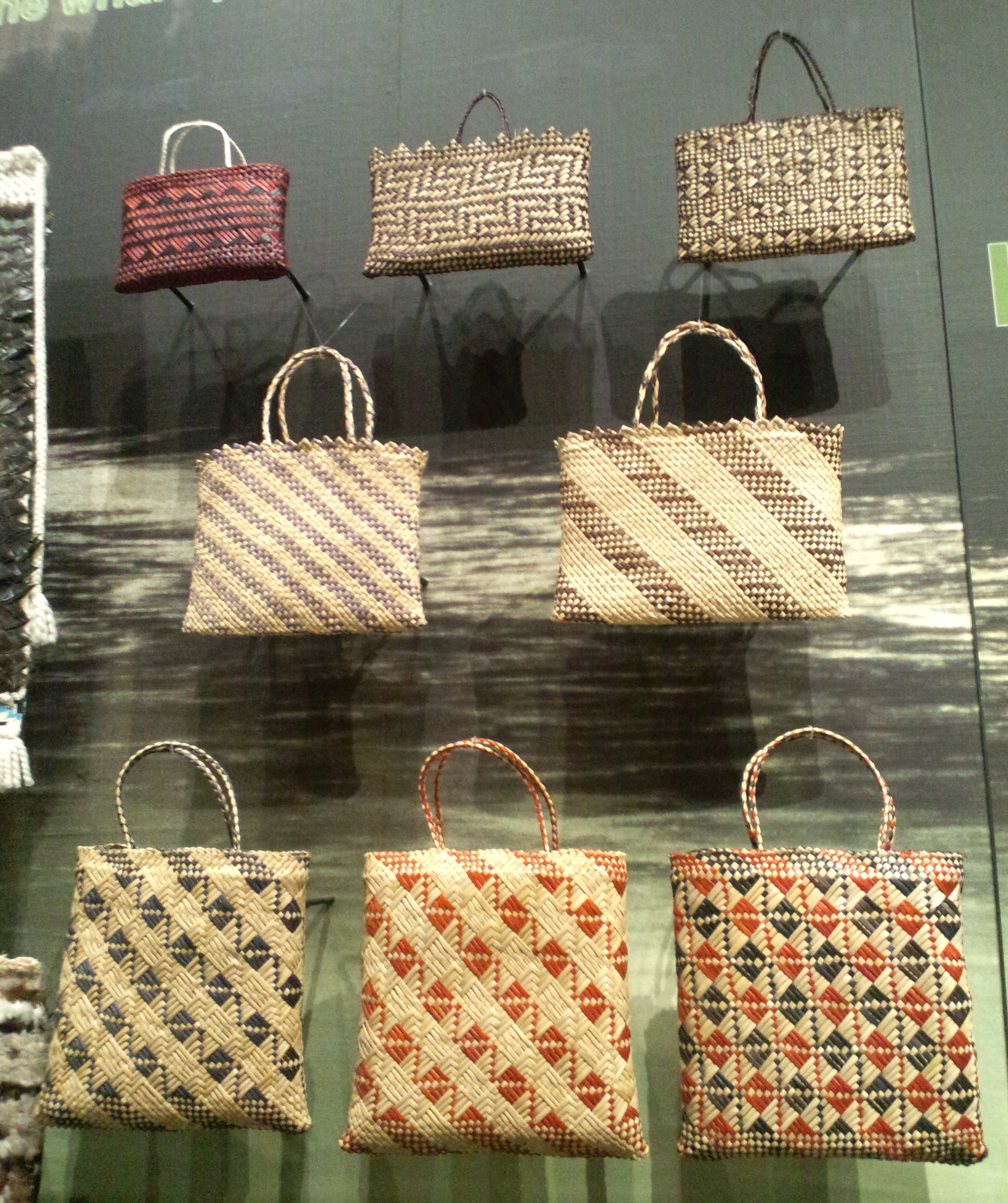
Kete whakairo (patterned flax baskets) on display at the National Museum of Ethnology, Osaka, Japan

Kete are traditional baskets made and used by New Zealand's Māori people. They are traditionally woven from the leaves of New Zealand flax called harakeke and have two handles at the top. Other materials are sometimes used, including sedge grass or the leaves of the nikau palm and cabbage tree. Modern designs may also use dyed materials. Some kete, known as kete whakairo, or "patterned bag", feature intricate geometric patterns, while more everyday baskets are known as kete mahi or simply kete.

== Uses ==
Kete may be of many sizes but are most often found in sizes similar to large handbags. They can be used to carry a variety of things, including food. Specialised kete were woven for each item that needed storage, resulting in dozens of specialised styles. Very small kete also exist, and can be used as gift containers. Traditionally, kete were given away following their completion.

Kete have also been used to bury placenta following a birth or miscarried fetuses following a miscarriage.

Kete whakairo are often used solely for decoration, often on walls.

Māori taught beekeping by Europeans since the 19th century used straw kete as beehives.

== History ==
Kete were traditionally woven by women, with specific skills and techniques being passed down within families and closely guarded from outsiders.

Following colonisation, kete and other traditional textiles became less popular due to the introduction of manufactured containers. However, the practice of weaving kete did not fully die out and has become revitalised in the 20th and 21st centuries.

Kete have experienced a resurgence in New Zealand in recent years, being touted by weavers as a more sustainable option to plastic bags.

== Cultural significance ==
In addition to their practical uses, kete also "represent a container of knowledge and wisdom". Kete appear in Māori tradition and folklore. For example, in one story the god Tāne collects the stars of the Milky Way in a kete for Ranginui. In another, he receives three kete of knowledge when he climbs to the highest heaven: a kete of light, a kete of darkness, and a kete of pursuit. These kete were then passed on to the Māori people.

== In popular culture ==
Kete have been used as symbols of Māori culture in a variety of situations, from Kiwiana to kitchen implements. A kete emoji was included on the first Māori emoji keyboard, released in 2016.

The design of the New Zealand Memorial in Canberra is meant to evoke the handles of a kete.

== See also ==
- Māori traditional textiles
- Pōhā
