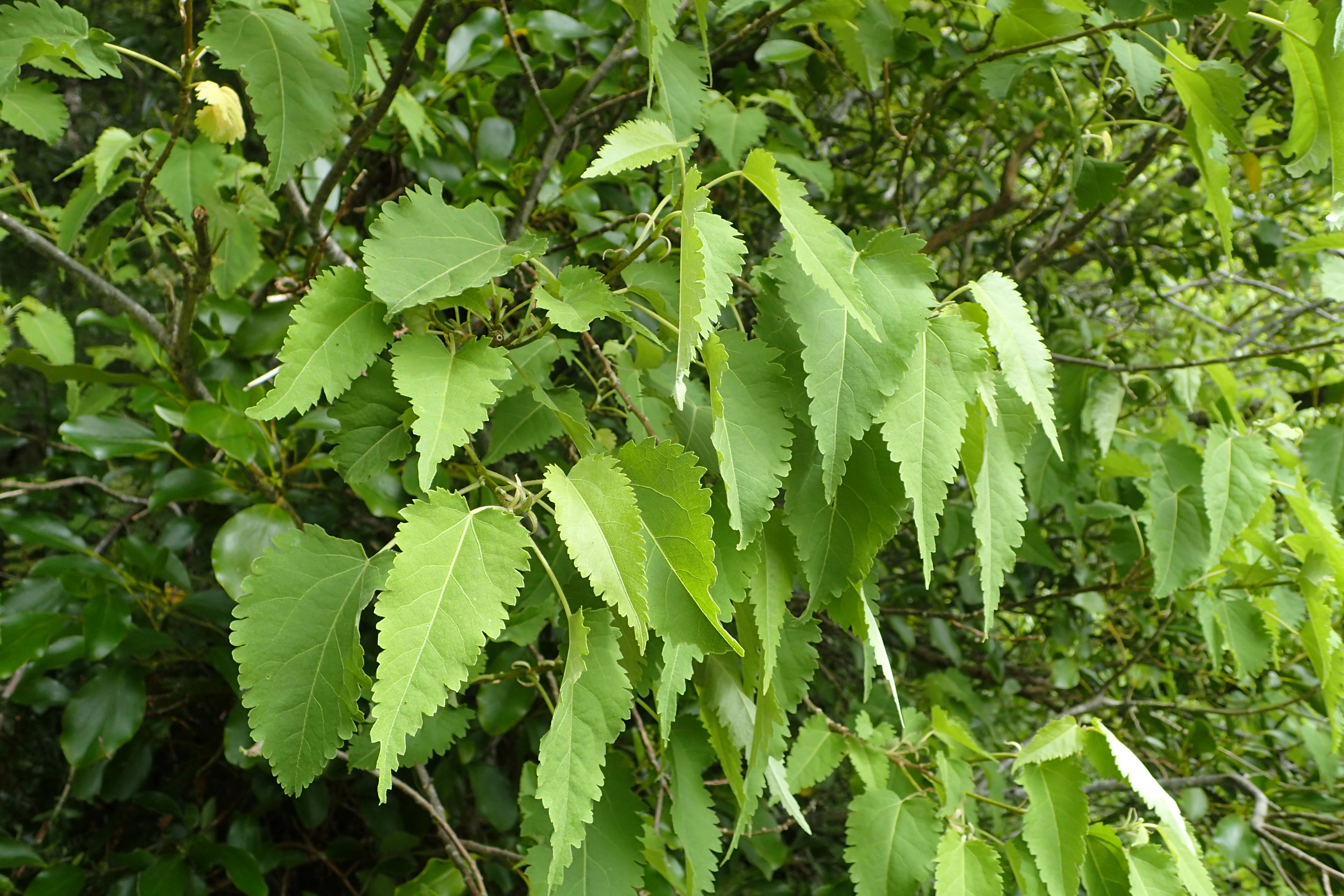
- H. lyallii in Mount Cook Village, Canterbury, New Zealand

Scientific classification
- Kingdom: Plantae
- Clade: Tracheophytes
- Clade: Angiosperms
- Clade: Eudicots
- Clade: Rosids
- Order: Malvales
- Family: Malvaceae
- Genus: Hoheria
- Species: H. lyallii

Binomial name
- Hoheria lyallii Hook.f.

= Hoheria lyallii =

Species of tree

Hoheria lyallii, the mountain lacebark, is a species of flowering plant in the mallow family Malvaceae, endemic to New Zealand, where it grows on drier mountainous areas of South Island — mainly in eastern Canterbury and Marlborough. Growing to 7 m (23 ft), it is a deciduous shrub or small tree with hairy leaves and slightly scented white flowers in summer.

The Latin specific epithet lyallii honours the Scottish naturalist and explorer David Lyall (1817–1895). In cultivation in the United Kingdom this plant has gained the Royal Horticultural Society's Award of Garden Merit. Hoheria lyallii and Hoheria glabrata (which has a similar appearance) are known in Māori as houi, and were likely used as textiles by South Island Māori.
