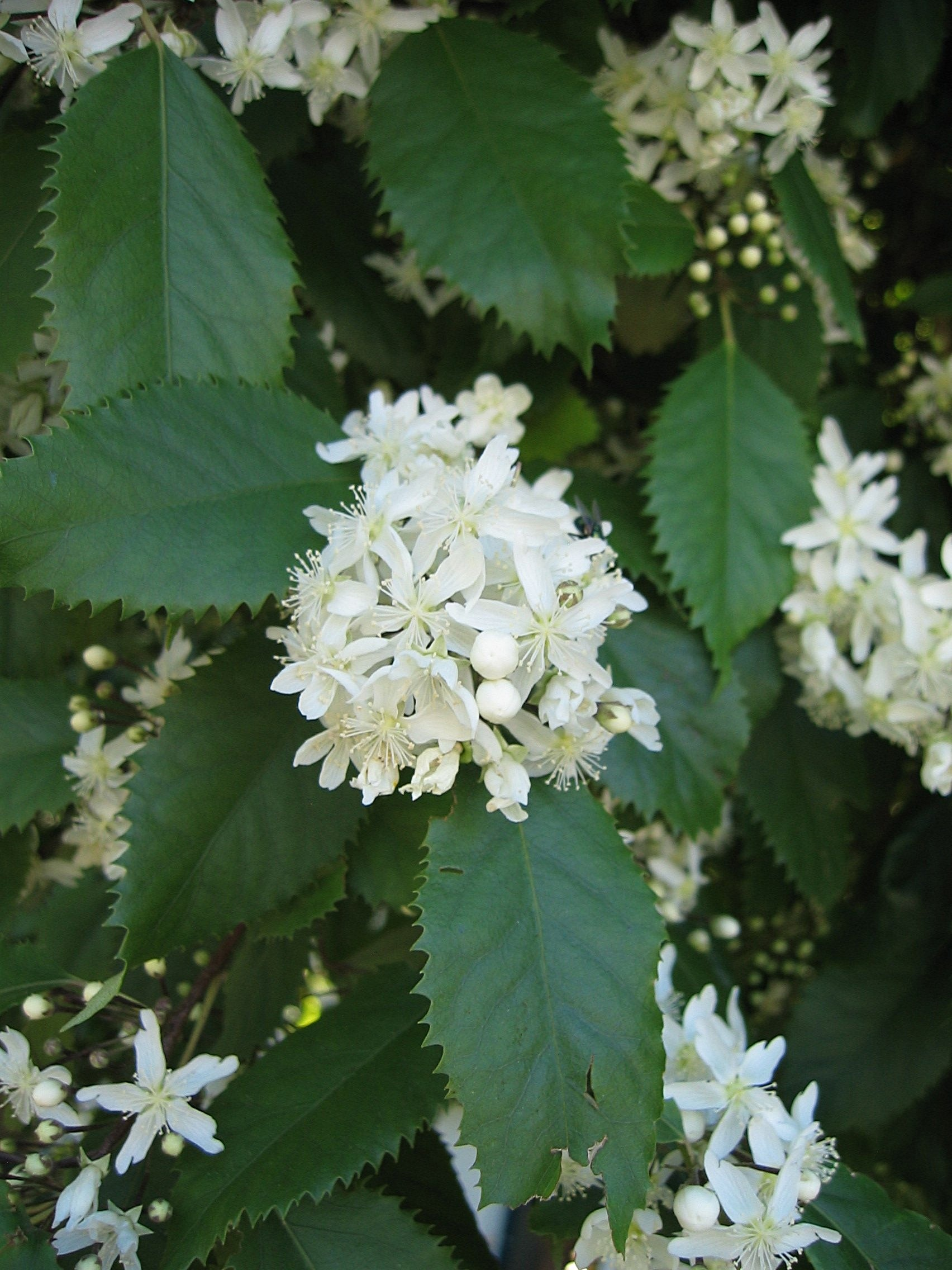

Scientific classification
- Kingdom: Plantae
- Clade: Tracheophytes
- Clade: Angiosperms
- Clade: Eudicots
- Clade: Rosids
- Order: Malvales
- Family: Malvaceae
- Genus: Hoheria
- Species: H. populnea

Binomial name
- Hoheria populnea A.Cunn.

= Hoheria populnea =

Species of flowering plant

Hoheria populnea, commonly known as houhere, lacebark, or New Zealand mallow, is a species of flowering plant in the family Malvaceae, endemic to New Zealand.

H. populnea is found from the coast to lowland forests, and has a natural distribution from the North Cape of the North Island, to the Bay of Plenty. It can grow into a tree 12 metres tall and has broad, oval leaves, with serrated margins. The leaves are dark green, 5–12 cm long and 6 cm wide. Houhere produces white flowers in clusters from January to March.

The bark of the plant was used in Māori traditional textiles to create ropes, hats, kete, and headbands. Oral histories tell of early experiments to create felted material from the plant, similar to aute (the paper mulberry used in Polynesian textiles), however attempts were unsuccessful.
