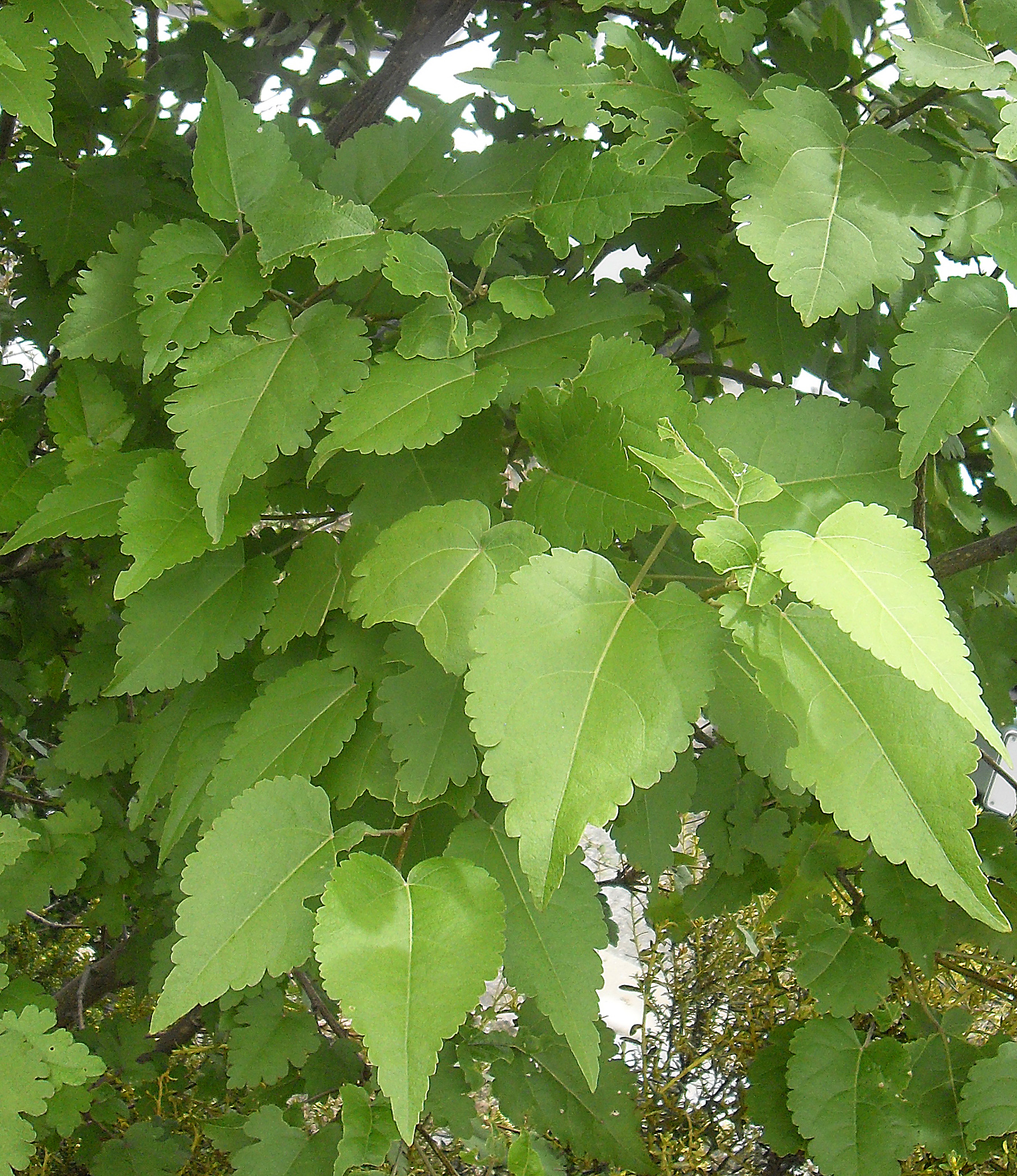
- Ribbonwood leaves in Aoraki / Mount Cook National Park

Scientific classification
- Kingdom: Plantae
- Clade: Tracheophytes
- Clade: Angiosperms
- Clade: Eudicots
- Clade: Rosids
- Order: Malvales
- Family: Malvaceae
- Genus: Hoheria
- Species: H. glabrata

Binomial name
- Hoheria glabrata Sprague & Summerh.

= Hoheria glabrata =

Species of flowering plant

Hoheria glabrata, the mountain lacebark or ribbonwood, is a species of flowering plant in the family Malvaceae, endemic to the South Island of New Zealand. It is one of the few deciduous trees to be found in New Zealand growing to 10 m (33 ft) tall with green leaves that turn yellow in autumn, and white flowers that appear around January.

Mainly found in the wetter parts of the mountainous regions of the South Island. Leaves are toothed around the margins, also look for the distinctive heart shape of the leaf which differentiates it from the very similar Hoheria lyallii. H. glabrata is a small tree which often grows multiple branches from the base although this does not always occur. Both the bark of Hoheria glabrata and Hoheria lyallii (known in Māori as houi) were likely used as textiles by South Island Māori.
