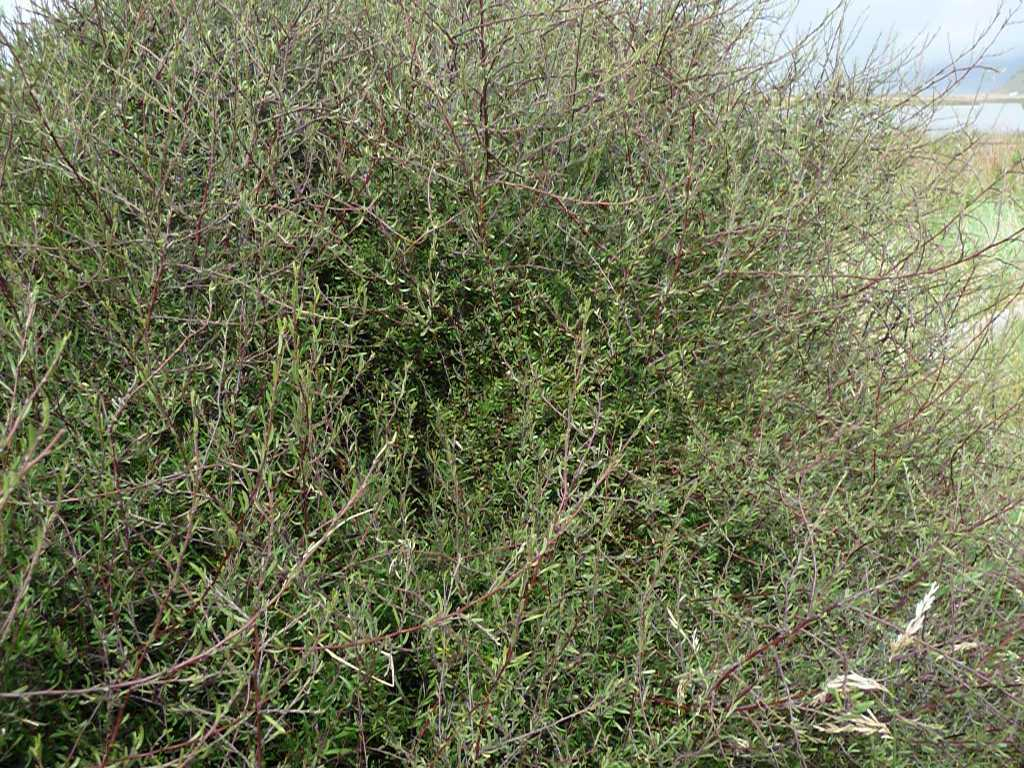

Conservation status
- Not Threatened (NZ TCS)

Scientific classification
- Kingdom: Plantae
- Clade: Tracheophytes
- Clade: Angiosperms
- Clade: Eudicots
- Clade: Rosids
- Order: Malvales
- Family: Malvaceae
- Genus: Plagianthus
- Species: P. divaricatus

Binomial name
- Plagianthus divaricatus J.R.Forst. & G.Forst.

= Plagianthus divaricatus =

Saltmarsh ribbonwood

Species of shrub endemic to New Zealand

Plagianthus divaricatus or saltmarsh ribbonwood is a plant that is endemic to New Zealand. The Māori name is makaka. Other common names it is known by marsh ribbonwood, houi, and runa.

The species was first described by Johann Reinhold Forster and Georg Forster in 1776.

Plagianthus divaricatus is an upright shrub with closely interwoven branches. The shrub is found in coastal environments in areas with salt swamp, sandy banks and throughout estuaries.

== Description ==
Plagianthus divaricatus or salt-marsh ribbonwood is a bushy shrub endemic to New Zealand with thin twiggy intertwined stems that have small clusters of narrow leaves. Its branches are divaricate in form and it can reach up to 3 m tall. Salt marsh ribbonwood (Plagianthus divaricatus) can present as open and twiggy, or the opposite as wiry and tightly knit. Lateral branches reach outwards from a stout stem, forming divergent linear twigs. Its twigs have small star-shaped hairs when looked at under a magnifying lens. The leaves are small and narrow, reaching 5–20 mm long and 0.5–2 mm wide. In spring it produces masses of small cream five petaled flowers. Its flowers are creamy white with purple tinged edges and are small and drooping. Only the male flowers are sweet smelling. It has small white fruit, approximately 5 mm wide. It hybridises with lowland ribbonwood (Plagianthus regius), which produces tall, bushy, deciduous shrubs. The leaves of the hybrid are grey-green, wider, and flatter than P. divaricatus.

== Life cycle and phenology ==
The detailed life cycle of salt marsh ribbonwood is mostly unknown. Leaf phenology for the majority of species in Plaginathus are deciduous, meaning seasonal shedding of leaves, with a dioecious breeding system. Divaricating shrub species are often pollinated by unspecialized insects, and have been documented as exhibiting heteroblasty, a common occurrence in the Plagianthus alliance which means that the juvenile form is kept within a mature plant. Some divaricating shrubs grow erect branches as a signal that they have moved from a juvenile to an adult.

Saltmarsh ribbonwood is a dicotyledonous plant, meaning they produce two seed leaves upon germination. They produce several flowers, or a cluster named an inflorescence, on a specific branch. The flowers are produced in early spring from September to October. Flowers are often arranged in a solitary pattern or cyme. Pollination is likely to occur through cross pollination due to the heavy presence of moths interacting with saltmarsh ribbonwood flowers, and due to wind in the exposed habitats occupied by saltmarsh ribbonwood.

== Range ==
Plagianthus divaricatus is endemic to New Zealand. The Plagianthus genus contains only two species, P. regius and P. divaricatus, which are both endemic to New Zealand and the Chatham Islands. Plagianthus divaricatus is present across New Zealand's North and South Islands, as well as the Chatham Islands and Stewart Island. It is found on both the west and east coasts in sheltered coastal and estuarine areas or inland off stony beaches. It is also likely to be as far south as the Dusky Sound in Fiordland.

== Habitat preferences ==
Plagianthus divaricatus is found in coastal environments, such as in coastal wetlands, sandy banks and throughout estuaries. It grows inland along estuarine waterways. It is also known to grow off from stony beaches. It is predominantly a wetland plant but can occasionally be found in upland areas. Plagianthus divaricatus is commonly found growing with; Olearia solandri, Coprosma propinqua and Muehlenbeckia complexa.

Plagianthus divaricatus is also known to germinate better in lower and higher saline conditions compared to other similar estuarine species. It is also quite a cold tolerant species, which could be due to its divaricating nature which Diels in 1897 proposed as an evolutionary adaptation of subtropical genera in response to the colder temperatures of the glacial periods.

=== Soil preferences ===
Plagianthus divaricatus is halophytic, meaning it prefers soils with high salinity and is hydrophytic, meaning it prefers to grow in a wet environment of highly saturated soil, though it is occasionally found growing in dryer areas. It is tolerant to cold and warm temperatures and is present across the entire country.

== Interactions ==
=== Predators, parasites, and diseases ===
There is currently not an extensive record of the relationship between disease and salt marsh ribbonwood. However, species that dwell in coastal areas are vulnerable to invasive exotic species such as creeping bent (Agrostis stolonifera), mouse ear chickweed (Cerastium fontanum), Yorkshire fog (Holcus lanatus), cat's ear (Hypochaeris radicata), buck's horn plantain (Plantago coronopus), procumbent pearlwort (Sagina procumbens), and several clovers and trefoils (Trifolium and Lotus spp.). Despite these threats, salt marsh ribbonwood is often a dominant species amongst the coastal community. Further threats to coastal turf species such as saltmarsh ribbonwood include trampling by grazing farm animals like cattle, sheep, and deer. As for most species, human interference from recreation or erosion are also common threats to survival.

=== Plant interactions ===
Saltmarsh ribbonwood is a host of lichens, including the At Risk – Naturally Uncommon species Teloschistes sieberianus, and two common species: Parmotrema reticulatum and Ramalina celastri. Plagianthus divaricatus has been recorded to grow alongside Muehlenbeckia australis (pohuehue), Rubus fruticosus (European blackberry), Pteridium esculentum (Bracken fern, rarauhe), Phormium tenax (Flax, harakeke), Cordyline australis (New Zealand cabbage tree, tī kouka), and Apodasmia similis (Oioi).

Herbivore species associated with Plagianthus divaricatus have been recorded on Landcare research and given a reliability score from a scale of 1–10 to indicate the level of evidence for the association. The following received a 10 on this scale and are described as directly affecting the plants’ structure: Batrachomorphus adventitiosus (Hemiptera: Cicadellidae); Ichneutica scutata (Lepidoptera: Noctuidae); Harmologa oblongana (Lepidoptera: Tortricidae); Hoherius meinertzhageni (Coleoptera: Anthribidae); Liothula omnivora (Lepidoptera: Psychidae); Peristoreus australis (Coleoptera: Curculionidae); Pseudococcus hypergaeus (Hemiptera: Pseudococcidae); Romna scotti (Hemiptera: Miridae); Scolypopa australis (Hemiptera: Ricaniidae) and Stigmella aigialeia (Lepidoptera: Nepticulidae). The following received a 9 on the scale: Chloroclystis inductata (Lepidoptera: Geometridae); Leucaspis sp. ‘Tahuna Torea’ (Hemiptera: Diaspididae); Pseudocoremia lactiflua (Lepidoptera: Geometridae) and Salicicola maskelli (Hemiptera: Diaspididae).

=== Invertebrate herbivores and pollinators ===
Myzus persicae is an aphid present on P. divaricatus. Hoherius meinertzhageni is a beetle that tunnels in the dead wood of P. divaricatus. Two different plant hopper species feed on P. divaricatus, Anzora unicolor (Grey-Winged Plant Hopper) and Batrachomorphus adventitiosus. P. divaricatus is host to two gall mites. Aceri plagianthi which is endemic to New Zealand is only present on both P. regius and P.divaricatus. It causes similar deformities on the inflorescence as E. plaginus, as well as a white felty growth on the leaves. Eriophyes plaginus, also endemic to New Zealand, and also only present on both P. regius and P. divaricatus, causes deformities on the inflorescence and induces ‘witches' broom’ galls. Aphis mellifera, the honeybee, pollinates the flowers of P. divaricatus. Two species of mealybugs feed on P. divaricatus, Paracoccus albatus and Pseudococcus hypergaeus. A mirid sucking bug Halormus velifer feeds on P. divaricatus as does Romna scotti. Many different species of moths are herbivores of P. divaricatus. Chloroclystis inductata its caterpillars feed on the flowers. Caterpillars of Graphania scutata, Harmologa oblongana, Liothula omnivora (Case Moth), Pseudocoremia lactiflua and Stigmella aigialeia feed on the leaves of P. divaricatus. A wide variety of scale insect species are also present on P. divaricatus. Aphenochiton inconspicuous, Aspidiiotus nerii, Hemiberlesia lataniae, Hemiberlesia rapax, Leucaspis sp. (Tahuna Torea) which lives on the stems of P. divaricatus and Saissetia oleae. One sucking insect species Scolypopa australis. And lastly for invertebrates, one weevil species Peristoreus australis whose larvae are reared from the male flowers.

=== Seed dispersal ===
The seed dispersal of P. divaricatus is currently understudied, but common genera with which it is associated with such as Coprosma and Muehlenbeckia, even specifically C. propinqua and M. complexa, have their seeds dispersed by geckos. As geckos are omnivores, they eat a wide variety of things and when fruits are available, they will regularly consume fruits, making them an important seed disperser. Thus, it is likely that P. divaricatus is similarly dispersed as it has small fleshy fruit like that of Coprosma and Muehlenbeckia, as well specifically being found in association with C. propinqua and M. complexa.

=== Vertebrate browsers ===
One theory for the high numbers of divaricating plants in New Zealand, a group which P. divaricatus belongs to, is as an ecological adaption for protection against moa browsing. Therefore, sometime in the past, one of the primary herbivores of P. divaricatus could have been moa resulting in the plant evolving this twiggy shrublike appearance.

== Conservation history ==
Saltmarsh ribbonwood has been recorded as Not Threatened for the years 2004, 2009 and 2012. The lack of change within the conservation status may be credited to salt marsh ribbonwood having an isolated habitat, not commonly affected by humans.

== Other information ==
Plagianthus divaricatus has a chromosome count of 2n = 42.

Plagianthus means oblique or lop-sided flower and divaricatus means spreading or interlacing.
