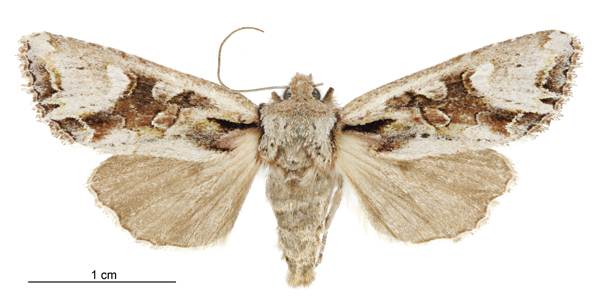
- Female
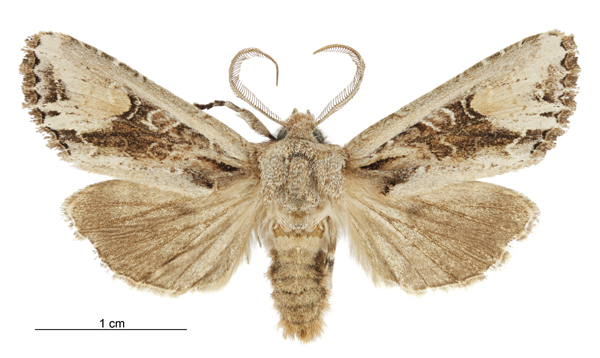
- Male

Scientific classification
- Kingdom: Animalia
- Phylum: Arthropoda
- Clade: Pancrustacea
- Class: Insecta
- Order: Lepidoptera
- Superfamily: Noctuoidea
- Family: Noctuidae
- Genus: Ichneutica
- Species: I. scutata

Binomial name
- Ichneutica scutata (Meyrick, 1929)

Synonyms
- Melanchra scutata Meyrick, 1929; Graphania scutata (Meyrick, 1929)

= Ichneutica scutata =

Species of moth

Ichneutica scutata is a moth of the family Noctuidae. It is endemic to New Zealand. This species can be found in the southern parts of the North Island as well as the eastern parts of the South Island. It is similar in appearance to I. insignis and I. skelloni but can be distinguished as I. scutata is much paler in appearance. It is likely this species inhabits lowland tussock grasslands as well as coastal dunes although it is not common in inland tussock grasslands. The larvae feed on a variety of herbaceous plants such as Plantago and Convolvulus species, Plagianthus divaricatus. It pupates on soil near its host plants. The adults are on the wing from late March to July.

== Taxonomy ==
This species was described by Edward Meyrick in 1929 from a specimen collected by George Vernon Hudson in winter in Wellington. The male holotype is held at the Natural History Museum, London. In 1988 J. S. Dugdale placed this species within the Graphania genus. In 2019 Robert Hoare undertook a major review of New Zealand Noctuidae species. During this review the genus Ichneutica was greatly expanded and the genus Graphania was subsumed into that genus as a synonym. As a result of this review, this species is now known as Ichneutica scutata.

== Description ==
Hudson described the grown larvae as follows:

Length... about 31 mm, stout, cylindrical, slightly tapering towards head, with very pronounced hindslope. Head pale ochreous brown, with blackish stripes. General colour deep purplish brown, darker and more suffused anteriorly; much paler dull ochreous subdorsal and lateral longitudinal bands, becoming darker and less distinct towards head. A series of elongate triangular black dashes on subdorsal line, one dash on each segment from the seventh to hindslope; another series of much less distinct dashes on lower lateral region. Underside of larva, legs and prolegs dull ochreous-brown, faintly tinged with green.

Meyrick described the adult male of the species as follows:

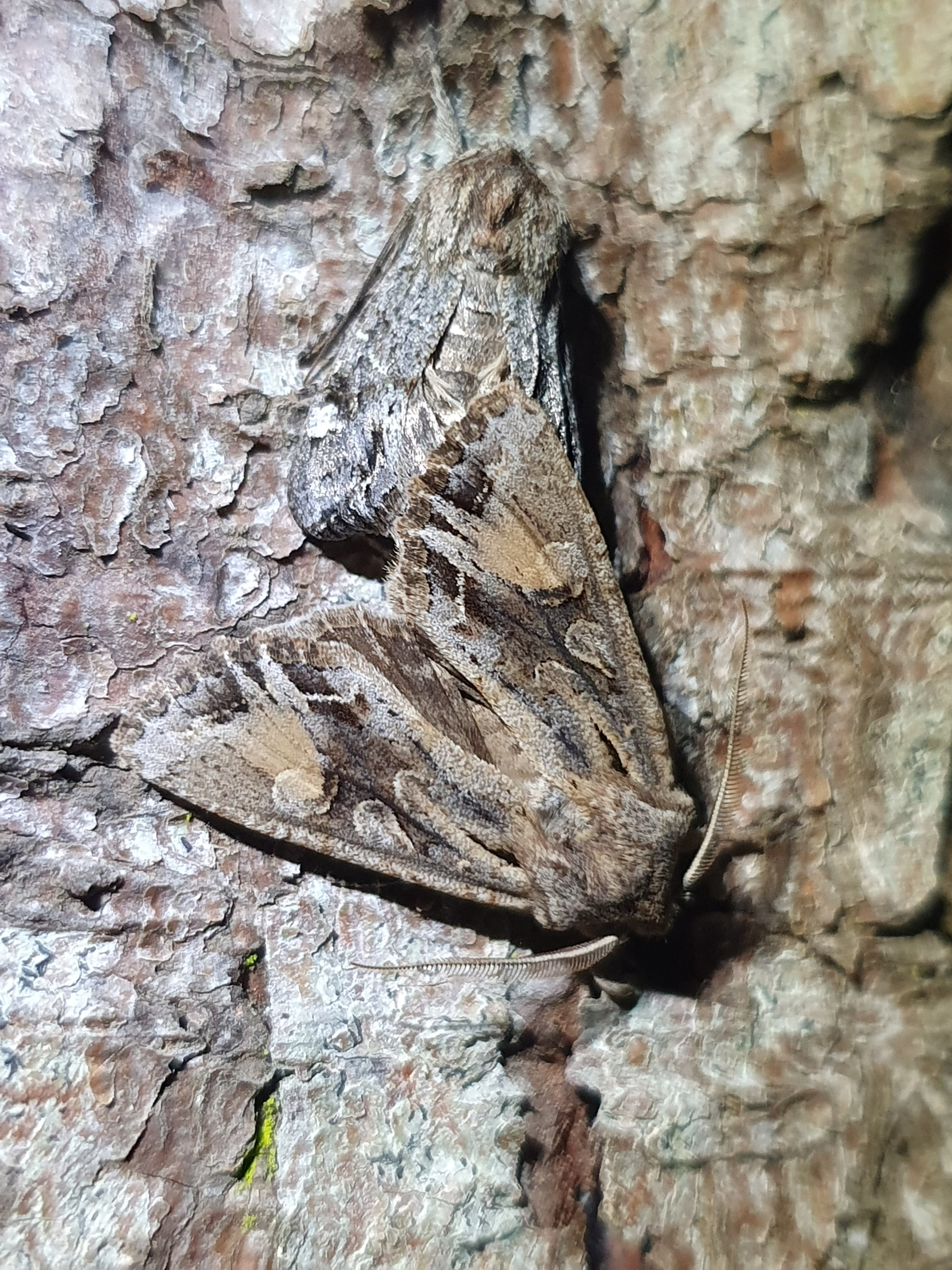
Ichneutica scutata

♂. 36 mm. Head, palpi, thorax light reddish-brown suffusedly mixed whitish. Antennae bipectinated except towards apex (a 4, b 3). Forewings elongate-triangular, termen obliquely rounded, crenulate; pale ochreous, basal half irrorated grey-whitish; subbasal, first, and second lines only indicated by brownish margins on costa; a fine dark reddish-brown median dash from base to 1/4, irregularly thickened near base; an oblique reddish-brown spot mixed blackish from dorsum towards base; roundish orbicular and smaller also round claviform beneath it outlined dark reddish-fuscous and tinged red-brownish internally, reniform ear-shaped, anterior edge formed by a double reddish-fuscous but posterior only faintly indicated, these spots united and orbicular also preceded by red-brownish suffusion forming a large median discal subquadrate patch, cubitus within this and shortly before it blackish-grey; from this patch an irregular thick dark reddish-fuscous streak runs along vein 2 to termen, vein tinged dark grey; subterminal line indicated by an obscure whitish shade cutting this streak and slightly edged brownish anteriorly near costa, on veins 3 and 4 forming two long well-defined dentations reaching termen, space between these and above them as far as vein 6 suffused dark brown except on termen, terminal area otherwise ochreous-whitish: cilia brown, slightly barred whitish. Hindwings pale greyish, suffusedly irrorated dark grey, obscurely indicating a discal spot, post-median line, and terminal band in which are two cloudy whitish elongate spots below middle.

The wingspan of the adult male of this species is between 30 and 39 mm and the wingspan of the female is between 34 and 36.5 mm. Hoare has also assigned a small dark form of this species, found in Mid Canterbury, to this species on the basis of the similarities in the form of antennae, male genitalia and time on the wing. I. scutata is very similar in appearance to I. insignis and I. skelloni but can be distinguished as I. scutata is much paler and the forewing streak is reddish brown in colour in comparison to the black streak of the other two species.

== Distribution ==
It is endemic to New Zealand. This species is found in the southern parts of the North Island and the eastern side of the South Island.

== Habitat ==
It has been hypothesised that this species may prefer habitats such as grasslands and open dunes but it does not appear to be common in inland tussock grasslands.

== Behaviour ==
Adults of this species are on the wing from late March to July.

== Life history and host species ==
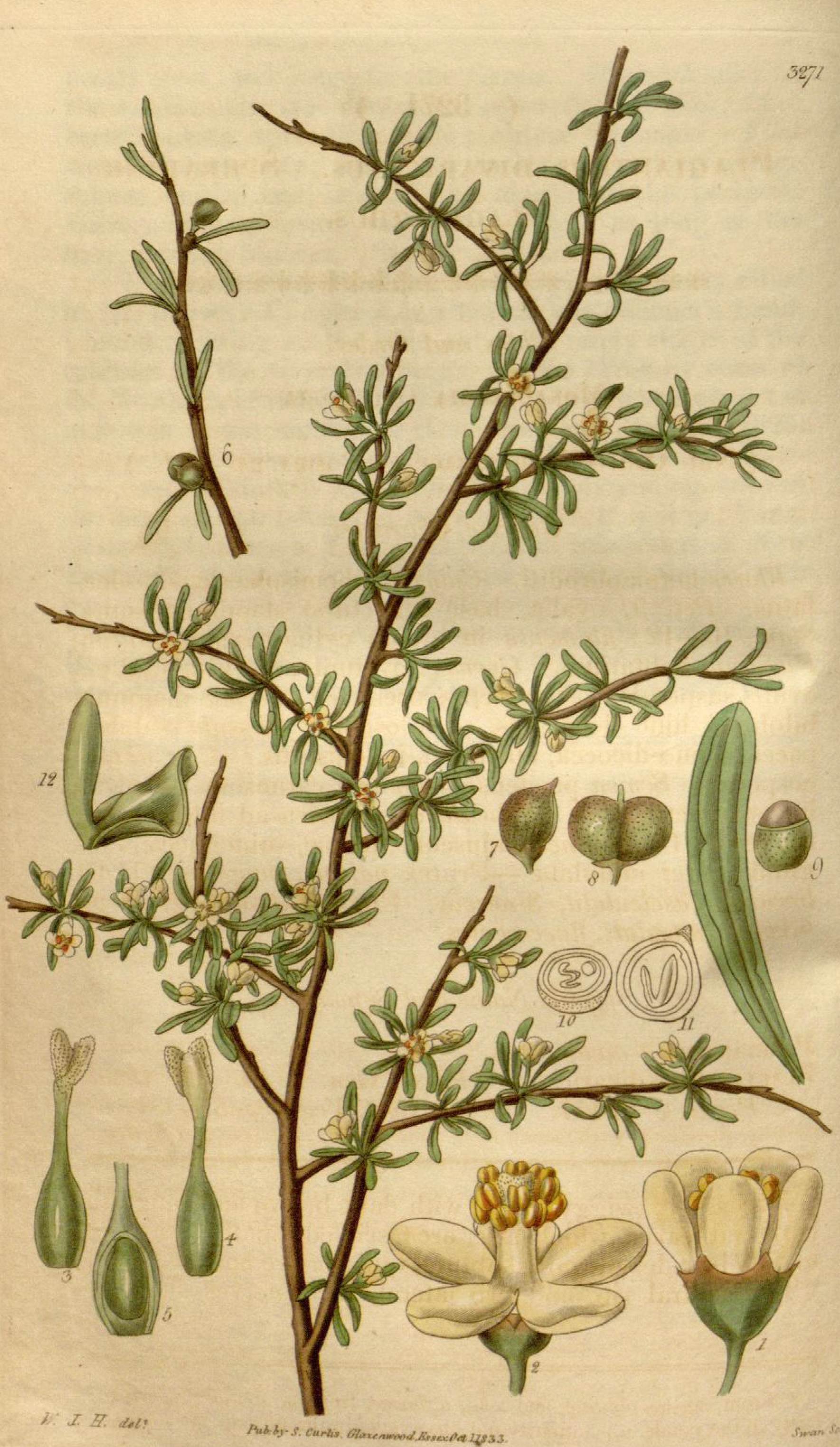
Plagianthus divaricatus, a host plant of I. scutata

The female of this species lays her eggs in a large cluster with the eggs nearly touching. The larvae feed on various herbaceous plants including grasses, herbs and shrubs. They have been recorded as feeding, either in the wild or when reared, on Plantago and Convolvulus species, Plagianthus divaricatus, Bromus willdenowii and Poa annua. This species pupates in the soil near its host plants.
