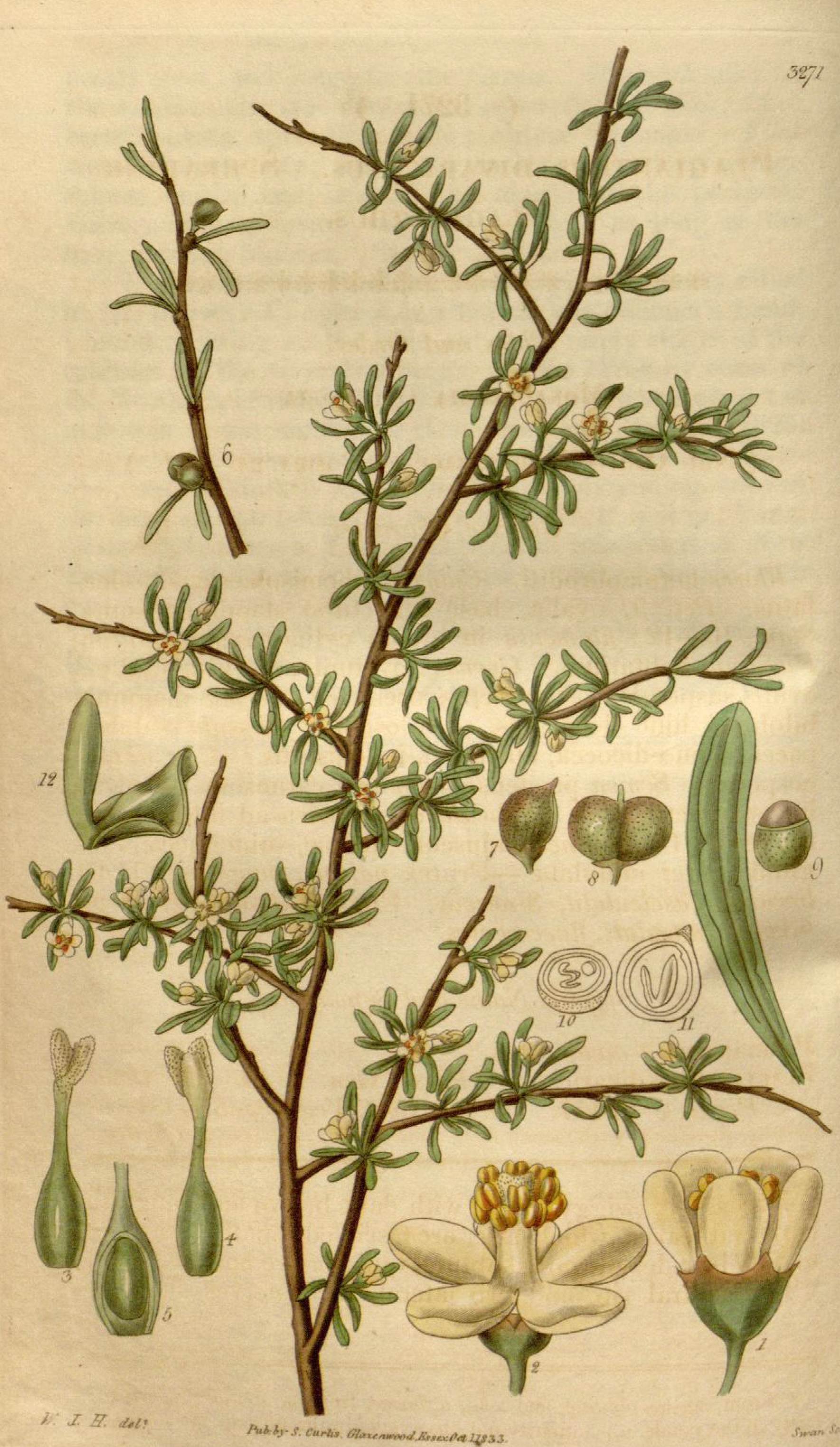
- Plagianthus divaricatus, illustration with analysis by William Jackson Hooker

Scientific classification
- Kingdom: Plantae
- Clade: Tracheophytes
- Clade: Angiosperms
- Clade: Eudicots
- Clade: Rosids
- Order: Malvales
- Family: Malvaceae
- Subfamily: Malvoideae
- Tribe: Malveae
- Genus: Plagianthus; J.R.Forst. & G.Forst.

Type species
- Plagianthus divaricatus J.R.Forst. & G.Forst.

Species
- Plagianthus × cymosus Kirk; Plagianthus divaricatus J.R.Forst. & G.Forst.; Plagianthus regius (Poit.) Hochr.

Synonyms
- Blepharanthemum Klotzsch; Philippodendron Endl.; Philippodendrum Poit.; Wrenciala A.Gray

= Plagianthus =

Genus of flowering plants in the mallow family

Plagianthus is a genus of flowering plants confined to New Zealand and the Chatham Islands. The familial placement of the genus was controversial for many years, but modern genetic studies show it definitely belongs in the Malvaceae subfamily Malvoideae. The name means "slanted flowers".

== Description ==
The type species P. divaricatus is a divaricate shrub which grows at the edges of salt marshes. The other species, P. regius is a tree which in juvenile stage may be divaricate (subsp. regius) or not (subsp. chathamica). Plagianthus × cymosus is a naturally-occurring hybrid of the two species found in the Chatham and North and South Islands.

These are the only species recognized currently. In the past, species from related genera such as Hoheria (New Zealand), Asterotrichion, Lawrencia and Gynatrix (Australia) were sometimes assigned to the genus. Instead, all these genera are now grouped in an informal "Plagianthus alliance".
