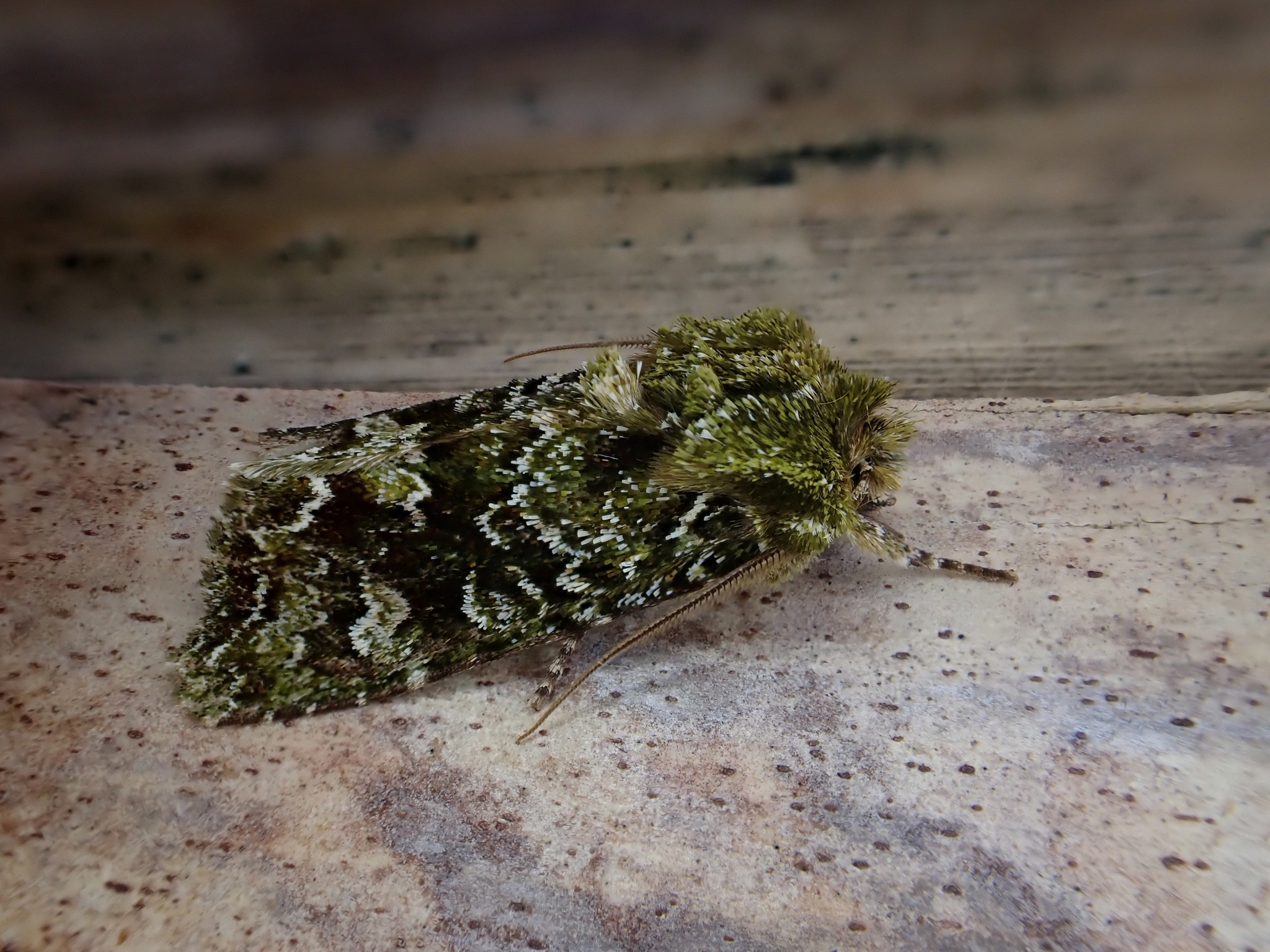
- Ichneutica peridotea found in Konini, West Auckland

Scientific classification
- Kingdom: Animalia
- Phylum: Arthropoda
- Clade: Pancrustacea
- Class: Insecta
- Order: Lepidoptera
- Superfamily: Noctuoidea
- Family: Noctuidae
- Genus: Ichneutica
- Species: I. peridotea

Binomial name
- Ichneutica peridotea Hoare, 2019

= Ichneutica peridotea =

Species of moth

Ichneutica peridotea is a moth of the family Noctuidae. This species is endemic to New Zealand. The species is similar in appearance to Ichneutica plena but are more dull olive-green in appearance and the male lacks the patches of orange-brown forewing scales of the male I. plena. As at 2021 I. peridotera has only been collected in the Auckland Region, although Robert Hoare hypothesises that its range may include the northern districts of the North Island. The lack of information about this species is partially due to the fact it is late winter flying. The life history of this species is unknown as are the hosts of its larvae. Its preferred habitat is forest and the adults are attracted to light.

== Taxonomy ==
I. peridotea was first described by Robert Hoare in 2019. The male holotype specimen was collected by Hoare via mercury vapour trap in Albany in July. The holotype specimen is held in the New Zealand Arthropod Collection.

== Description ==
This species is similar in appearance to I. plena but the adults of I. peridotea are a duller olive-green on the forewings and thorax and the base of the forewings lack the black markings found on the forewings of I. plena. The male I. peridotea forewings only have olive-green and white coloured scales whereas the male I. plena forewings also have orange-brown scales. The adult male has a wingspan of between 31 and 34 mm. The only known female specimen has a wingspan of 32 mm.

== Distribution ==
I. peridotea is endemic to New Zealand. Although this species is currently only known from Auckland, it is likely that it is present in the northern parts of the North Island. However it was not found during a survey of the Mahakirau Forest in the Coromandel Ranges.

== Habitat ==
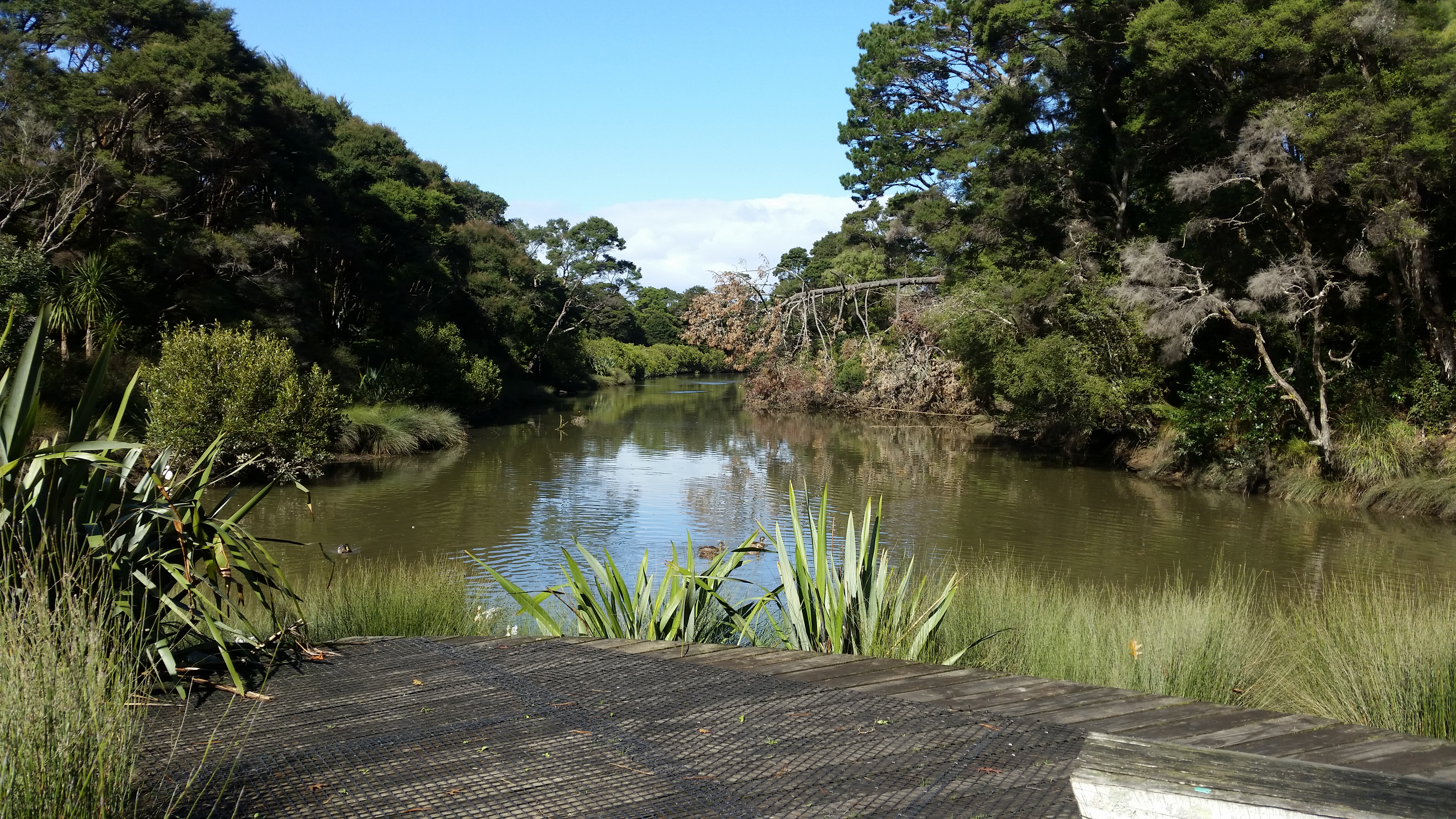
Lucas Creek in Kell Park, not far from the type locality of I. peridotea

The species has been collected in forested areas.

== Behaviour ==
Adults of this species are on the wing from July to September and are attracted to light. This species is likely to have been overlooked as a result of this species being on the wing in late winter.

== Life history and host species ==
The life history of this species is unknown as are the host species of its larvae.
