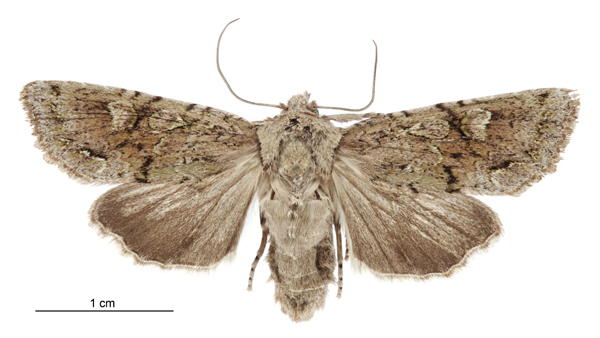
- Female
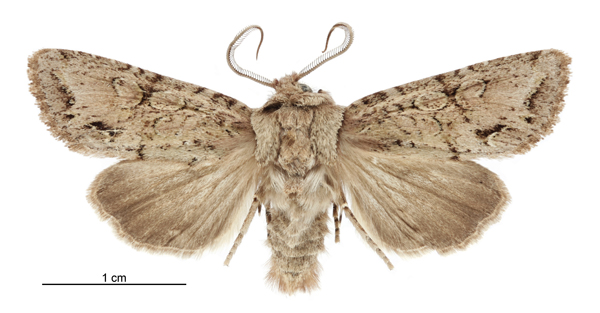
- Male

Scientific classification
- Kingdom: Animalia
- Phylum: Arthropoda
- Clade: Pancrustacea
- Class: Insecta
- Order: Lepidoptera
- Superfamily: Noctuoidea
- Family: Noctuidae
- Genus: Ichneutica
- Species: I. skelloni

Binomial name
- Ichneutica skelloni (Butler, 1880)

Synonyms
- Hadena skelloni Butler, 1880; Graphania skelloni (Butler, 1880); Melanchra beata Howes, 1906; Graphania beata (Howes, 1906)

= Ichneutica skelloni =

Species of moth endemic to New Zealand

Ichneutica skelloni is a moth of the family Noctuidae. This species is endemic to New Zealand. Its presence has been confirmed in the North Island only in the Wellington region but is widespread throughout the South Island. It is also found in Stewart Island. I. skelloni is extremely variable in size, in the colour and patterns on the fore and hind wings, length of pectinations on male antennae and even in its genitalia. A larger more patterned form can be found in Westland and Fiordland, a medium-sized form is found from Wellington to Stewart Island and there is also a smaller Dunedin and Southland form. This species can be confused with specimens with the species I. insignis, I. scutata and I. pelanodes. I. skelloni can be found in forest and shrubland habitat. Adults are on the wing from July to April and are attracted to light. Host plants for the larvae are found in the genera Plantago, Senecio and Ranunculus and also include the species Bellis perennis.

== Taxonomy ==
This species was first described by Arthur Gardiner Butler in 1880 and named Hadena skelloni. The holotype male specimen was collected in Marlborough by a Mr Skellon. Butler synonymised this name with Melanchra insignis in 1890 as he regarded it as a well marked variety of this species. George Howes in 1906, thinking he was describing a new species, named the species Melanchra beata. In 1988 J. S. Dugdale, in his catalogue of New Zealand Lepidoptera, also believed that Hadena skelloni was a synonym of Graphania insignis. In 2019 Robert Hoare undertook a major review of New Zealand Noctuidae. During this review Hoare reinstated this species and placed it within the genus Ichneutica. He also synonymised Melanchra beata into this species. As a result of this review, this species is now known as Ichneutica skelloni.

== Description ==
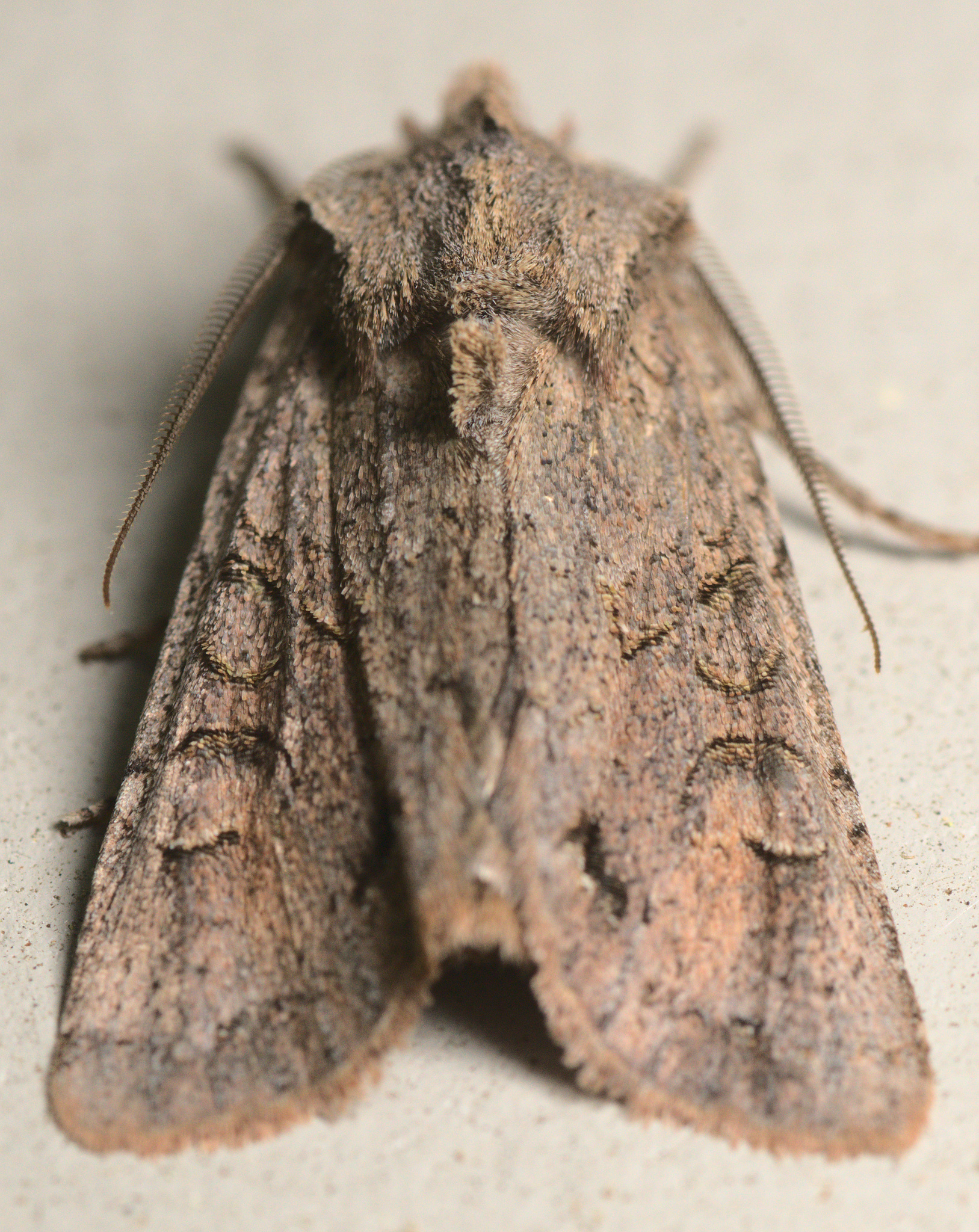
Living specimen.

Butler originally described the species as follows:

Primaries above laky-brown; a broad longitudinal internal sap-green streak, through which the submedian vein passes, and which is interrupted near the base by an oblique B-shaped black patch; an oblique abbreviated black dash near the base of interno-median area; discoidal and submedian spots bordered with pale green edged with black; discoidal area dark brown, "orbicular" spot of the same colour, slightly oblique and almost reniform; "reniform" spot pale laky-brown with a curved blackish internal stripe; submedian spot obtusely hexagonal, laky-brown; the two central lines slender, black, opposed, dentate-sinuate, not distinctly traceable above the median vein; submedian line black, with white inner border bounded within by sap-green and dark brown spots or patches, irregularly dentated as in H. pisi; the usual costal markings; secondaries pinky-brown, with diffused dusky border, enclosing an ill-defined abbreviated sinuated whitish streak; abdominal border broadly fringed with pinky-whitish; fringe of outer margin narrow, yellowish, tipped with dark brown, body rufous-brown, varied with pale greenish and whity-brown scales; collar with the usual bisinuated blackish line; wings below pale sericeous pinky-brown, with blackish discocellular spots and a brown discal line; primaries with a pale submarginal line; secondaries with an indistinct greyish submarginal streak; body below dull laky-brown, pectus slightly greyish, venter with a lateral black line. Expanse of wings 1 inch 6 lines.

This species as reinstated by Hoare is extremely variable in size, colour and patterns on the fore and hind wings, length of pectinations on male antennae and even genitalia. It encapsulates the larger more colourful patterned form of the species found in Westland and Fiordland, the medium-sized form found in Wellington down to Stewart Island and the smaller Dunedin and Southland form. Hoare argues that as a result of the variation of this species being continuous attempts to describe more than one species have failed.

The wingspan of male adults of this species range from 32 to 40 mm and for adult females from 36 to 44 mm. All forms of this species can be distinguished from I. insignis visually as the male I. skelloni have longer pectinations on their antennae, the black markings on the subdorsal portion of the forewings are shorter and broader in appearance and there are differences between the two species in the male genitalia. Some forms of I. skelloni might also be confused with I. scutata and I. pelanodes.

== Distribution ==
This species is endemic to New Zealand. This species has been found and confirmed only in the Wellington region of the North Island but is widespread in the South Island. This species is also found on Stewart Island. George Hudson records it being present in Hastings but Hoare states that this requires further investigate.

== Habitat ==
This species is found in forest and shrubland habitat.

== Behaviour ==
This species are on the wing from July to April. The adult moths are attracted to light.

== Life history and host species ==
Larvae from the smaller beata form from Dunedin and Southland have been raised from egg on herbaceous plants including species within the genera Plantago, Senecio and Ranunculus as well as the species Bellis perennis.
