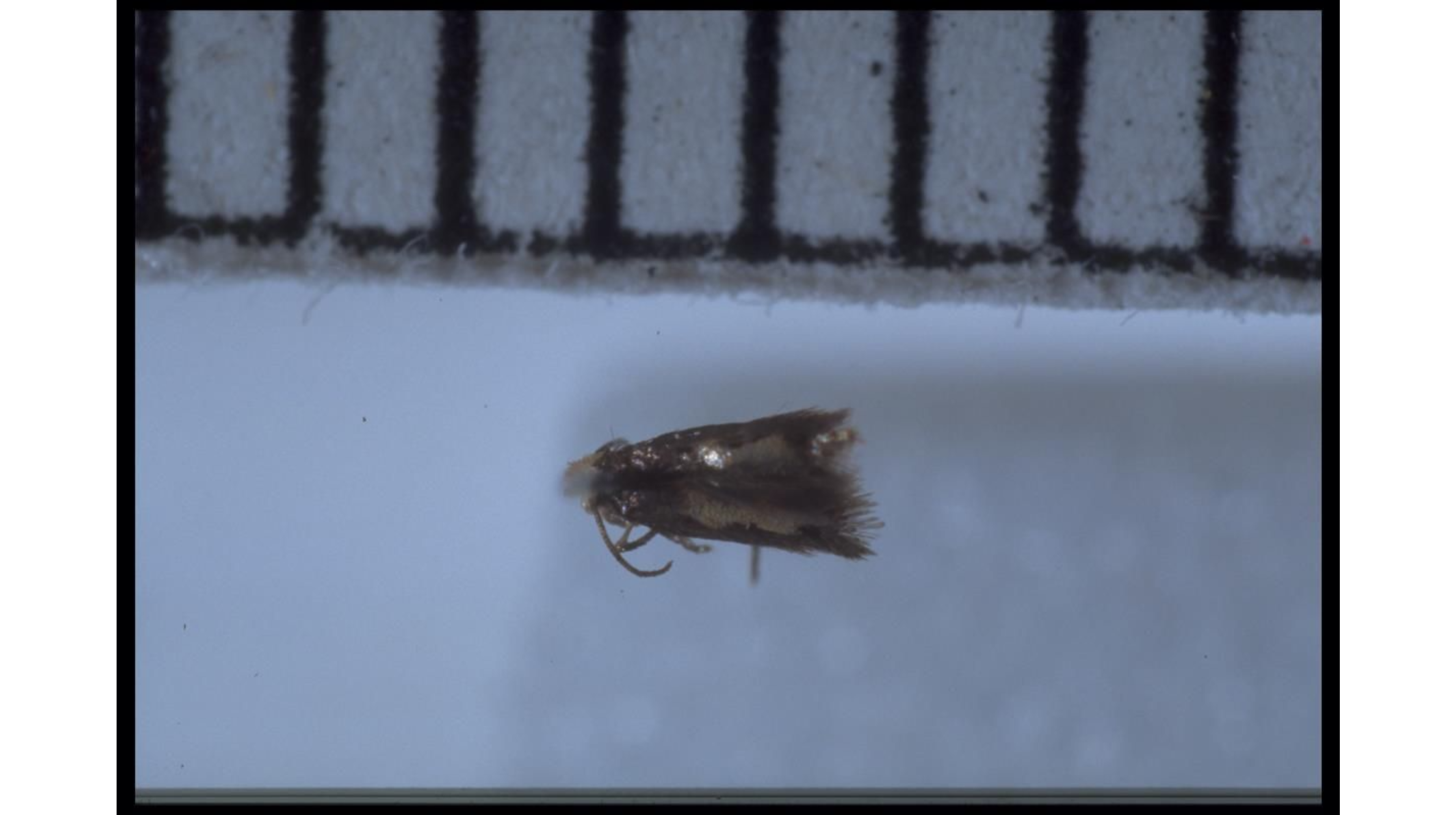
- Male holotype
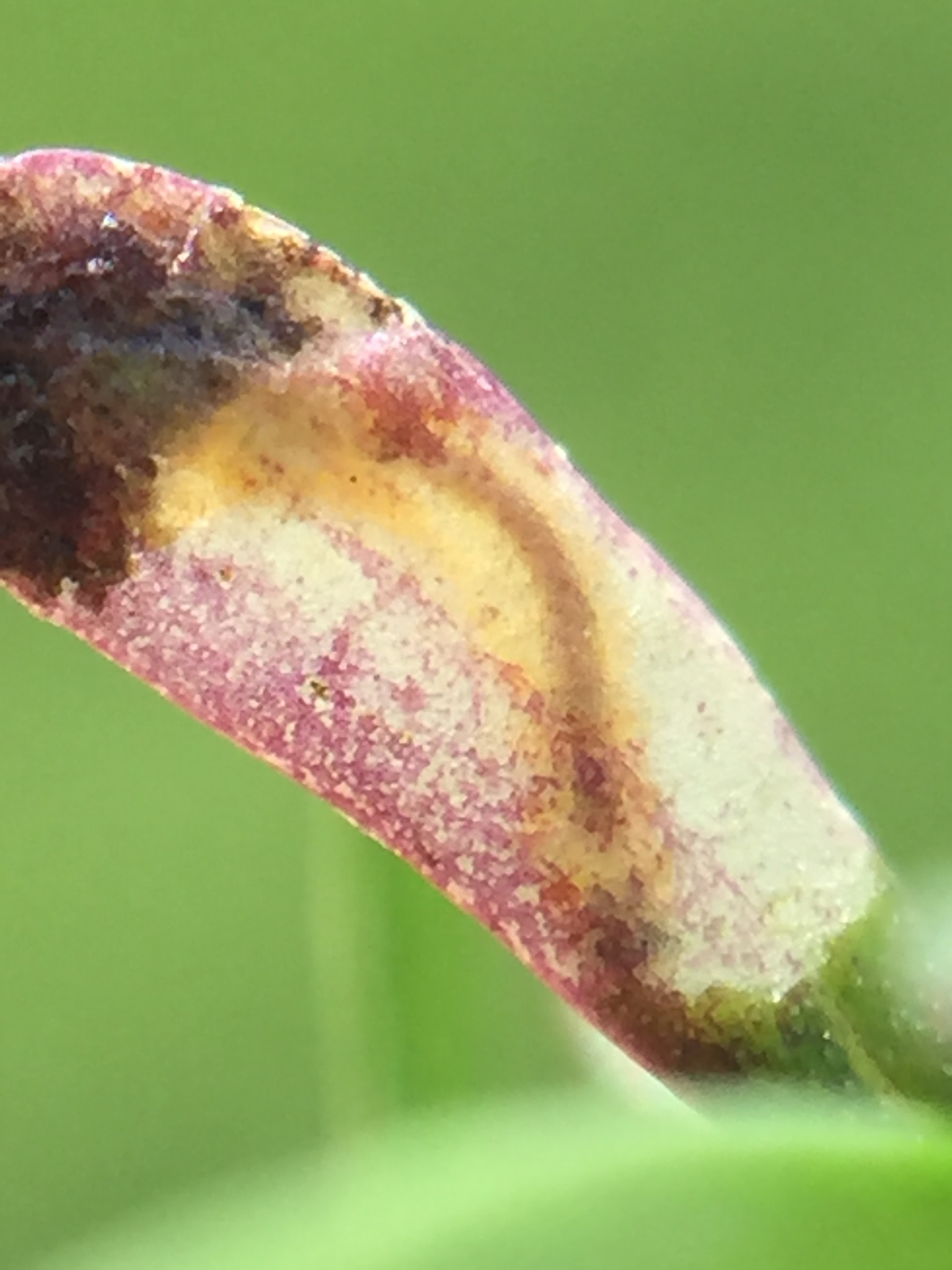
- Larva mining leaf of host plant

Scientific classification
- Kingdom: Animalia
- Phylum: Arthropoda
- Clade: Pancrustacea
- Class: Insecta
- Order: Lepidoptera
- Family: Nepticulidae
- Genus: Stigmella
- Species: S. aigialeia

Binomial name
- Stigmella aigialeia Donner & Wilkinson, 1989

= Stigmella aigialeia =

Species of moth endemic to New Zealand

Stigmella aigialeia is a moth of the family Nepticulidae. It is endemic to New Zealand and can be found on both the North and South Islands. The larvae of this species are leaf miners and are known to feed on the leaves of Plagianthus divaricatus. Larvae have been recorded as feeding in April, May and September. They pupate in leaf litter on the ground under their host plant. Adults of this have been observed on the wing in January, February, September and October, in coastal locations particularly in the preferred habitat of its host plant, that is salt marshes and sandbanks.

== Taxonomy ==
This species was first described in 1989 by Hans Donner and Christopher Wilkinson from specimens collected in Auckland, Queen Charlotte Sound and Invercargill. The male holotype specimen, collected at Huia Reserve on 29 September 1973 by B. M. May and emerged on the 23 October 1973, is held in the New Zealand Arthropod Collection.

== Description ==
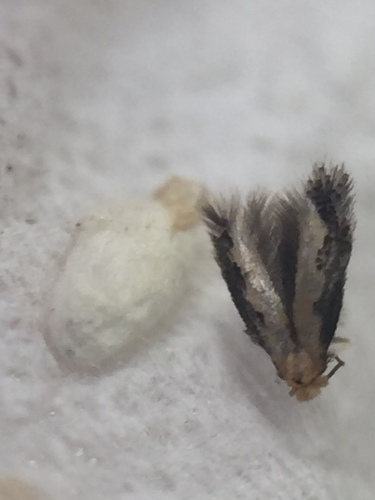
Stigmella aigialeia

The larvae of this species are pale yellow in colour and are approximately 3mm long.

The wingspan of the adult moth is approximately 4 mm. The moth is grey in appearance with brown grey and then whitish forewings. The forewings have two black spots. The hindwings are grey in colour. It is similar in appearance to the female of S. hoheriae but is much smaller.

== Distribution ==
S. aigialeia is endemic to New Zealand. This species can be found both in the North and South Islands.

== Biology and behaviour ==
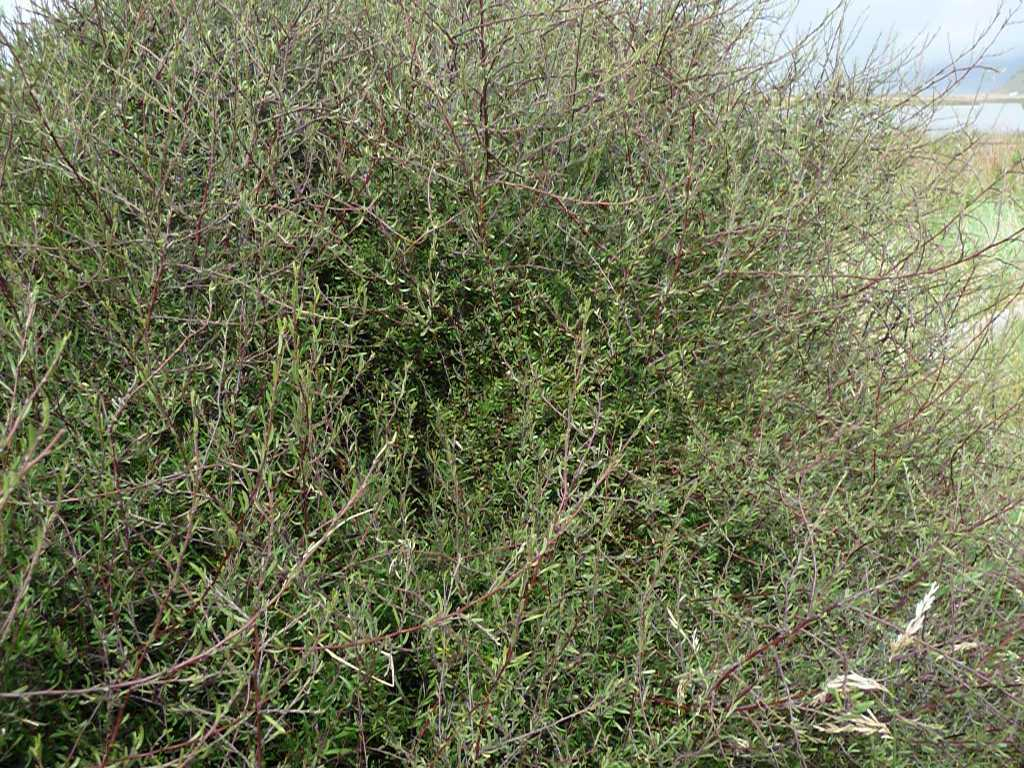
Host plant Plagianthus divaricatus

The larvae of this species mine the leaves of their host plant.

Adults have been recorded in January, February, September and October. Probably in one but possibly in two generations per year.

== Habitat and host plants ==
The larvae feed on Plagianthus divaricatus and can therefore this species is found in the coastal habitat such as salt marshes and sandbanks which is favoured by that shrub.
