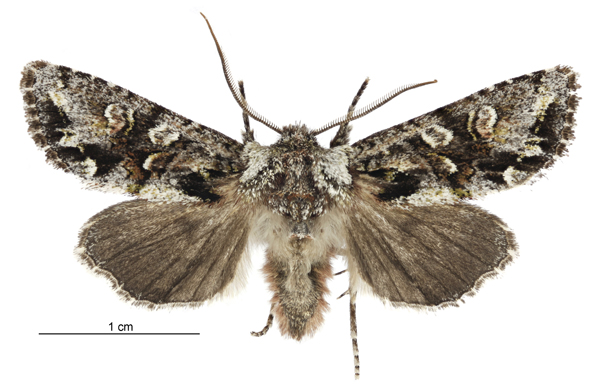
- Male
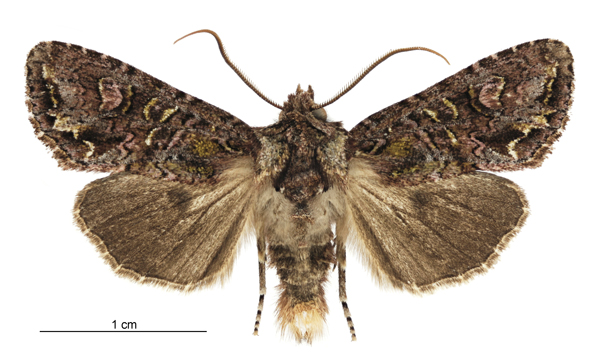
- Female

Scientific classification
- Kingdom: Animalia
- Phylum: Arthropoda
- Clade: Pancrustacea
- Class: Insecta
- Order: Lepidoptera
- Superfamily: Noctuoidea
- Family: Noctuidae
- Genus: Ichneutica
- Species: I. pelanodes

Binomial name
- Ichneutica pelanodes (Meyrick, 1931)

Synonyms
- Melanchra pelanodes Meyrick, 1931; Graphania pelanodes (Meyrick, 1931)

= Ichneutica pelanodes =

Species of moth

Ichneutica pelanodes is a moth of the family Noctuidae. It is endemic to New Zealand and has been found in scattered locations in the North, South and Stewart Islands. I. pelanodes is easily confused with I. skelloni as the two species are visually extremely similar. In the North Island though the range of the two species appears not to overlap. Generally of the two species I. pelanodes tends to be darker in appearance. I. pelanodes inhabits wetlands but the life history of this species is unknown as are the host species of its larvae. Adults are on the wing from October to February and are attracted both to sugar and light traps.

== Taxonomy ==
This species was first scientifically described by Edward Meyrick in 1931 using a male specimen collected by George Hudson in January at National Park. The holotype specimen is held at the Natural History Museum, London. In 1988 J. S. Dugdale placed this species within the Graphania genus. In 2019 Robert Hoare undertook a major review of New Zealand Noctuidae species. During this review the genus Ichneutica was greatly expanded and the genus Graphania was subsumed into that genus as a synonym. As a result of this review, this species is now known as Ichneutica pelanodes.

== Description ==
Meyrick described the species as follows:

♂ 36mm. Head, thorax pale moss-green mixed whitish and sprinkled black, a black transverse bar on collar, thoracic crests suffused deep red-brown. Palpi dark grey, mixed deep reddish. Antennae bipectinated to ¾ (about 2). Forewings somewhat elongate triangular, termen rather obliquely curved, hardly waved; grey irrorated white and black and irregularly mixed dull green, edges of markings partially roughened; dorsal edge mixed red-brown; subbasal line partially edged black, a green spot following this beneath cell; first line nearly straight, partially edged black; orbicular subquadrate, laterally edged white and then black, reniform subquadrate, formed by a green bar between two black ones followed by a white blotch edged black posteriorly, beyond this a reddish-brown space, space between them tinged reddish-brown, claviform represented by a rounded reddish-grey spot edged posteriorly white and then black, four white dots on costa beyond middle surrounded black; second line formed by a contorted grey streak irrorated white, edged anteriorly by some blackish scales; subterminal slender, whitish, shortly angled towards costa and shortly bidentate beneath middle, in disc edged anteriorly green suffusion mixed black towards middle, on dorsal third suffused pale rosy-brown and preceded by a subcrescentic dark fuscous blotch, posteriorly edged blackish suffusion except towards extremities, on costa edged black anteriorly: cilia light brownish, slenderly barred whitish, a dark grey antemedian and red-brown apical line. Hindwings grey; cilia grey, base and tips whitish.

The wingspan of the adult male is between 30 and 37 mm where as the wingspan for the female is between 33 and 36 mm. Although this species can be easily confused with I. skelloni, the two species have North Island ranges that do not overlap. I. pelanodes is found only in districts from Northland to Taupo and I. skelloni is only found in the Wellington district. Also I. pelanodes tends to be darker in appearance and female I. skelloni forewings often have paler pinkish ochreous colour in comparison to the other species. The two species are also distinguishable via the shape of the male genitalia.

== Distribution ==
It is endemic to New Zealand. It is found in scattered locations in the North, South and Stewart Islands. In the North Island it can be found from Northland to Taupō and in the South Island from Fiordland and Otago Lakes. It has only been collected at Mason Bay at Stewart Island.

== Habitat ==
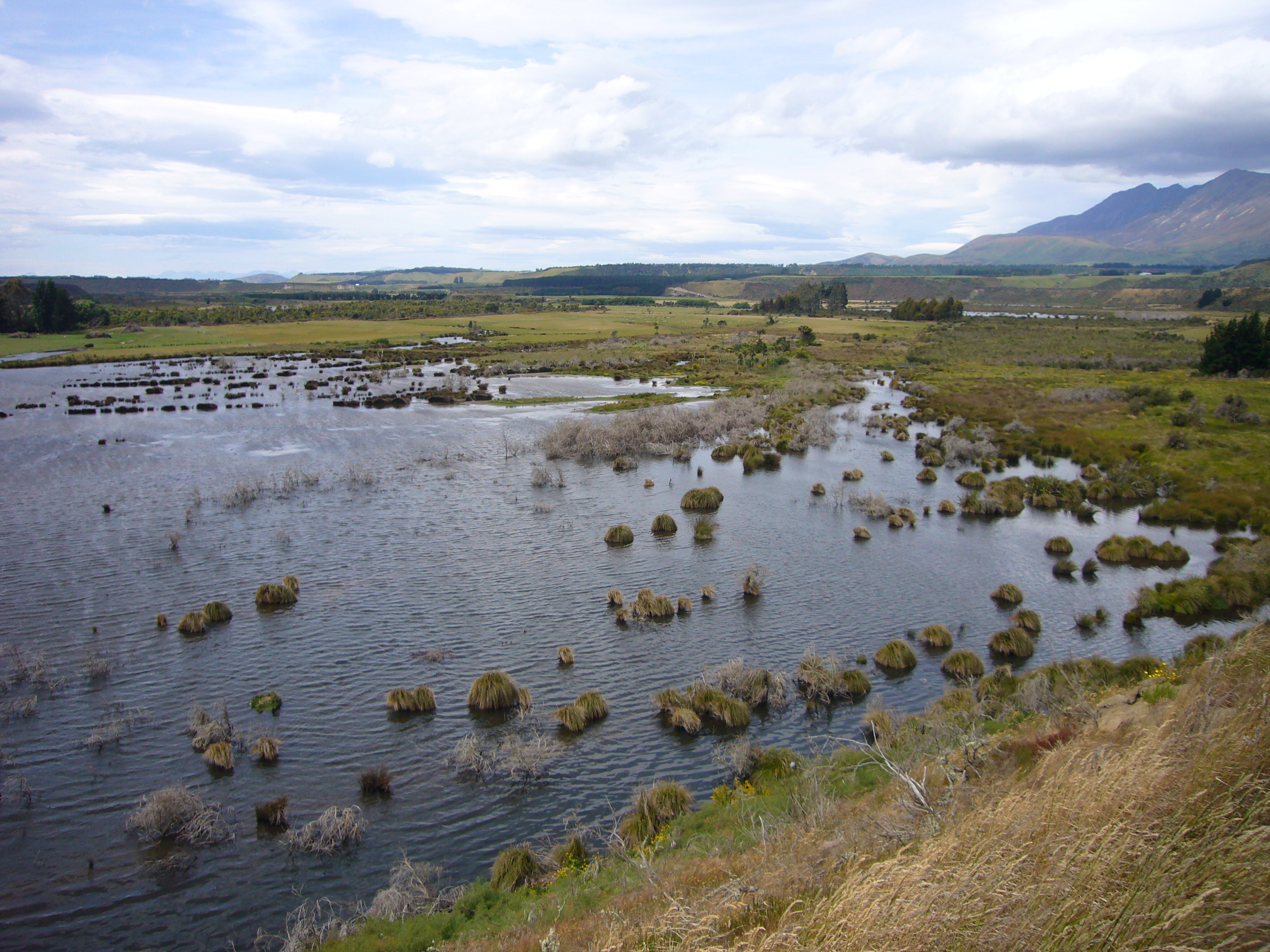
Wetland habitat preferred by I. pelanodes

I. pelanodes prefers to inhabit wetlands.

== Behaviour ==
This species is attracted to sugar traps. Adult I. pelanodes are also attracted to light and are on the wing from October to February.

== Life history and host species ==
The life history of this species is unknown as are the host species of its larvae.
