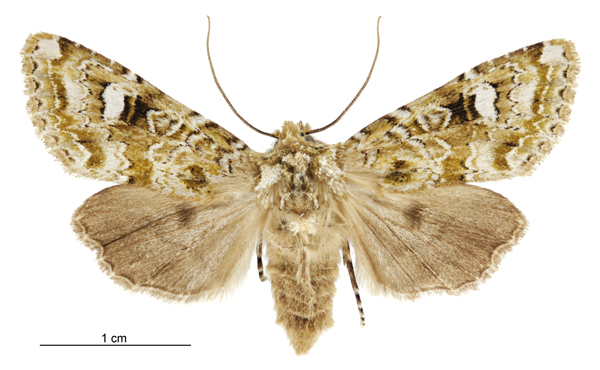
- Female
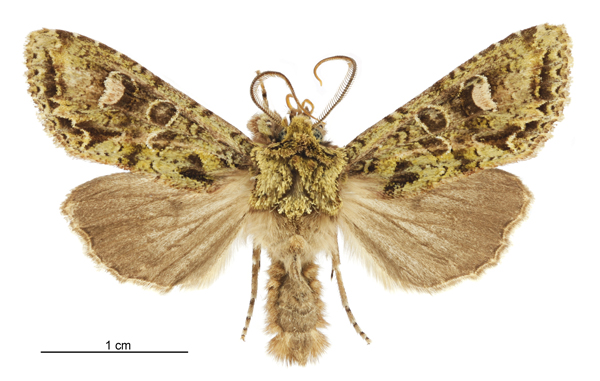
- Male

Scientific classification
- Kingdom: Animalia
- Phylum: Arthropoda
- Clade: Pancrustacea
- Class: Insecta
- Order: Lepidoptera
- Superfamily: Noctuoidea
- Family: Noctuidae
- Genus: Ichneutica
- Species: I. plena

Binomial name
- Ichneutica plena (Walker, 1865)

Synonyms
- Erana plena Walker, 1865; Dianthoecia plena (Walker, 1865); Dianthoecia viridis Butler, 1880; Mamestra plena (Walker, 1865); Melanchra plena (Walker, 1865); Graphania plena (Walker, 1865)

= Ichneutica plena =

Species of moth

Ichneutica plena is a moth of the family Noctuidae. It is endemic to New Zealand. It is widespread throughout the North, South and Stewart Islands. It is a variable in appearance and therefore can be confused with its near relatives I. peridotea and I. insignis. The larvae of I. plena feed on herbaceous plants including Fuchsia excorticata, Coprosma species, and introduced species such as garden fuchsia as well as crops such as apple trees. Adults of this species are on the wing from late August until May.

== Taxonomy ==
This species was first described by Francis Walker in 1865 from a male specimen collected by T. R. Oxley. Although the original scientific description states the specimen originated in Auckland, the correct type locality is in Nelson. Walker originally named the species Erana plena. The lectotype specimen is held at the Natural History Museum, London. In 1880 Arthur Gardiner Butler, thinking he was describing a new species, named it Dianthoecia viridis. Edward Meyrick synonymised this name in 1887. In 1928 George Hudson described and illustrated this species under the name Melanchra plena. 1988 J. S. Dugdale, in his catalogue of New Zealand Lepidoptera, placed this species within the Graphania genus.

In 2019 Robert Hoare undertook a major review of New Zealand Noctuidae species. During this review the genus Ichneutica was greatly expanded and the genus Graphania was subsumed into that genus as a synonym. As a result of this review, this species is now known as Ichneutica insignis. However Hoare in that review raised the possibility that more than one species is encompassed within this species. His reasoning for this hypothesis is the species' variable wing pattern, the differences in the pectinations of the male antenna, the differing shapes of the male and female genitalia and the different chemical makeup of the female sex pheromones.

== Description ==
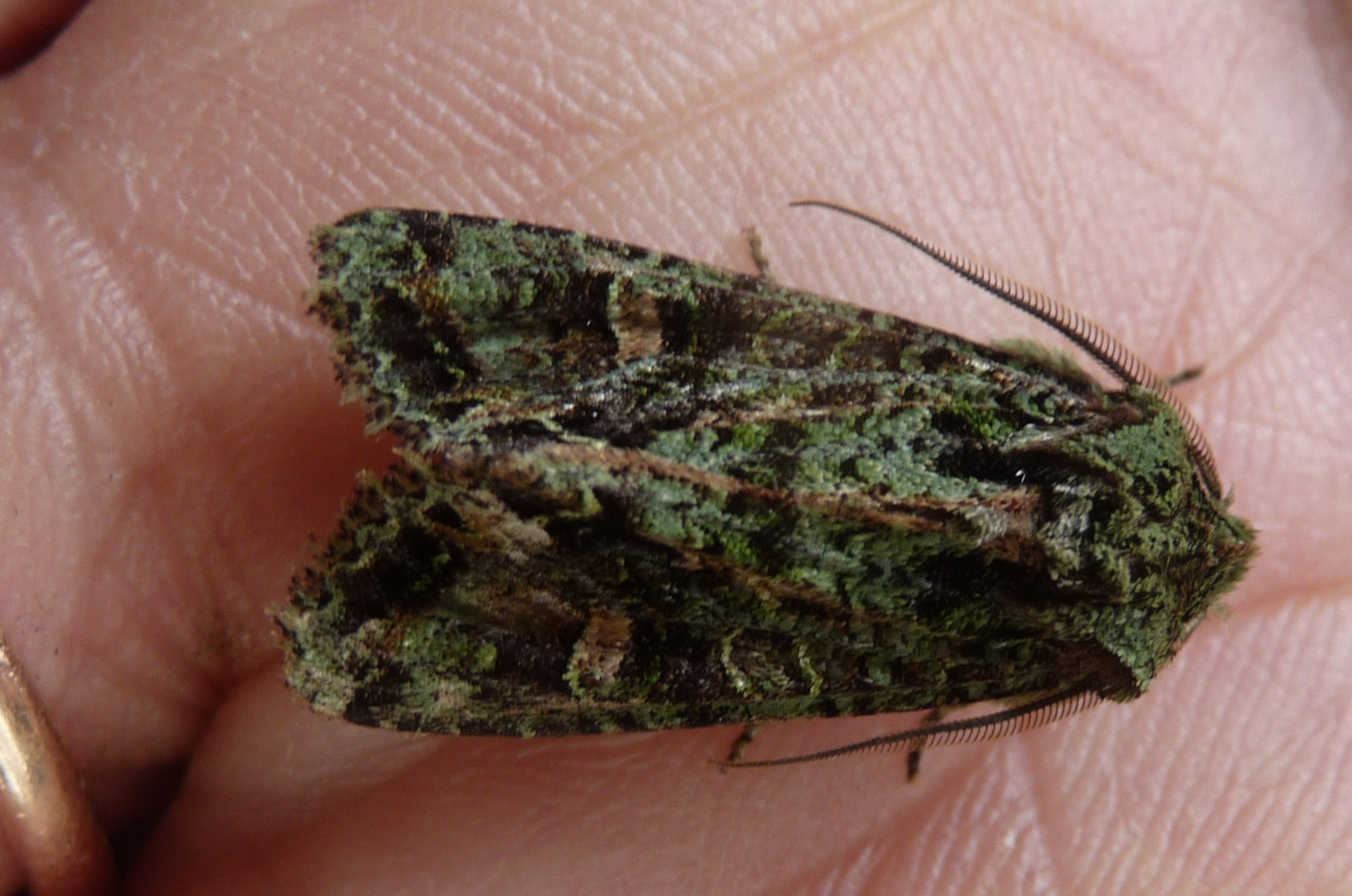
Ichneutica plena

George Hudson describes the larva of this species as follows:

The larva ... is about 1 1/2 inches in length, of fairly uniform thickness, slightly attenuated towards the head and thickened posteriorly. Its general colour is pale pinkish-brown becoming pale green on the ventral surface; there is an obscure wavy blackish lateral line, stronger near the middle of each segment; a wavy blackish subdorsal line stronger near the middle of the posterior segments and appearing from above as a series of very slightly oblique blackish marks.

Walker described the male adult of the species as follows:

Male. Green, cinereous beneath. Palpi hardly extending beyond the head; second joint densely pilose; third conical, less than one-fourth of the length of the second. Antennae rather long, slightly pectinated, except towards the tips. Abdomen brown, extending rather beyond the hind wings; apical tuft of moderate size. Femora and tibiae densely pilose; tarsi with black bands. Fore wings partly black-shaded, with several denticulated transverse black lines; orbicular and reniform marks large, pale green, black-bordered, slightly tinged with red, of the usual form; some pale cinereous points on the exterior part of the costa; marginal points black. Hind wings brown; fringe cinereous, interlined with brown; under side with a brown discal spot. Length of the body 8 lines; of the wings 18 lines.

The wingspan of the male of this species is between 31.5 and 39 mm and for the female is between 31 and 40 mm. I. plena is a variable species and can be confused with closely related species such I. peridotea and I. insignis.

== Distribution ==
I. plena is endemic to New Zealand. It is widespread throughout the North, South and Stewart Islands.

== Behaviour ==
Adults of this species are on the wing from late August to May. They are attracted to light and have been collected via a mercury vapour light trap.

== Life cycle and host species ==
The larvae of this species eat various herbaceous plants including Fuchsia excorticata, Coprosma species, and garden fuchsia. The larvae have also been recorded feeding on apples.
