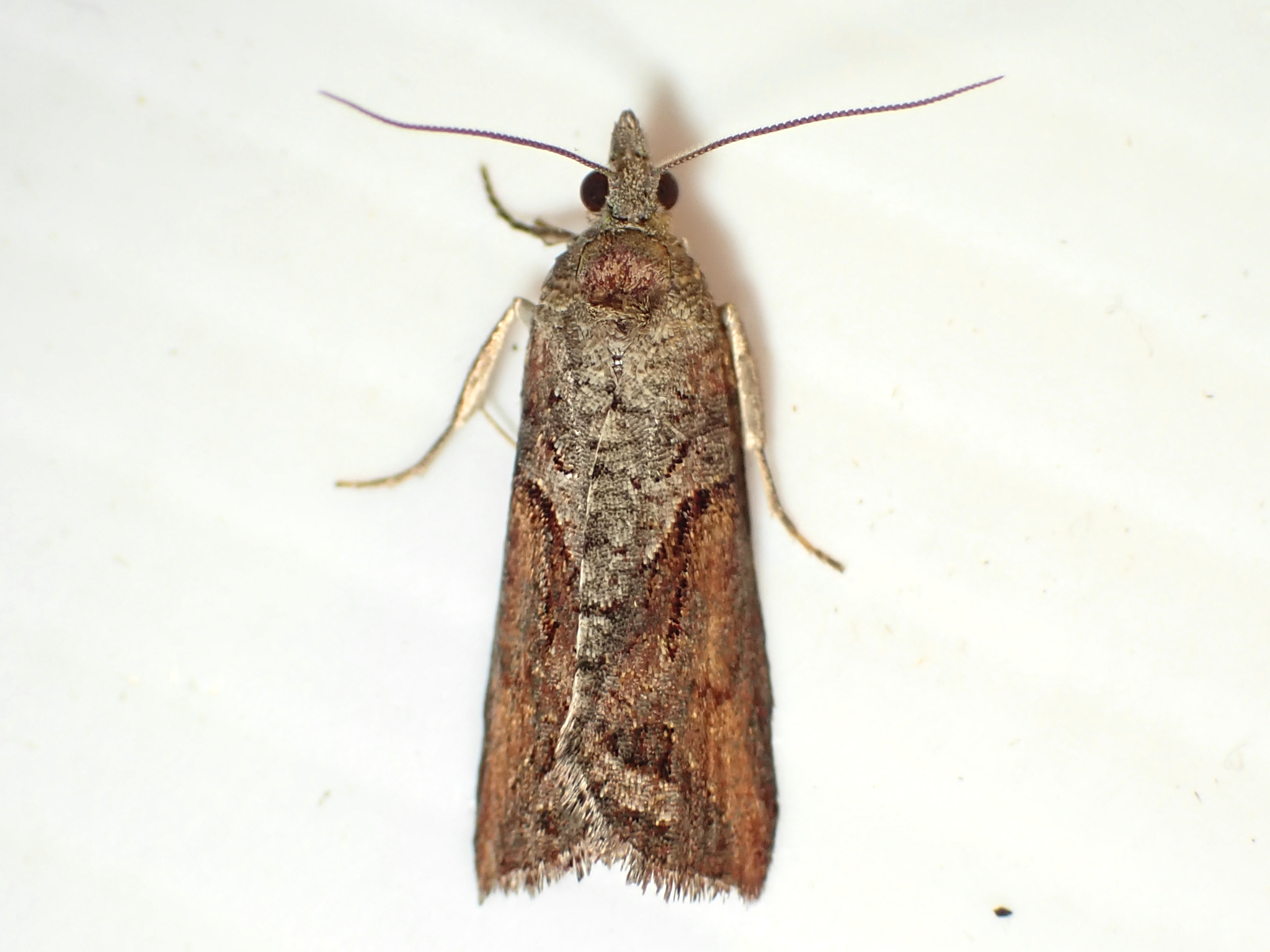

Scientific classification
- Kingdom: Animalia
- Phylum: Arthropoda
- Clade: Pancrustacea
- Class: Insecta
- Order: Lepidoptera
- Family: Tortricidae
- Genus: Harmologa
- Species: H. oblongana

Binomial name
- Harmologa oblongana (Walker, 1863)

Synonyms
- Teras oblongana Walker, 1863; Cacoecia oblongana (Walker, 1863); Teras cuneigera Butler, 1880; Teras inaptana Walker, 1863; Tortrix indomita Philpott, 1930

= Harmologa oblongana =

Species of moth

Harmologa oblongana is a species of moth of the family Tortricidae. This species was first described by Francis Walker in 1863. It is endemic to New Zealand.

== Taxonomy ==
This species was first described by Francis Walker in 1863 using a female specimen collected in Nelson by T. R. Huxley and named Teras oblongana. In the same publication Walker, thinking he was naming a new species, named this moth Teras inaptana. George Hudson discussed and illustrated this species under the name Harmologa oblongana in his 1928 book The butterflies and moths of New Zealand. In 1930 Alfred Philpott, thinking he was describing a new species, named this moth Tortrix indomita. Hudson went on to discuss and illustrate the larvae of this species in his 1950 book Fragments of New Zealand entomology. The female holotype is held at the Natural History Museum, London.

== Description ==
The forewings are ochreous whitish, suffused with brownish ochreous and fuscous grey along the margins. The costa and inner margin are strigulated (finely streaked) with dark fuscous and there is a distinct dark fuscous-grey basal patch, often mixed with ochreous. The hindwings are whitish grey, tinged with ochreous and spotted with dark grey. The apex is dark grey.

The male of this species is usually very dull looking, and it's wing-markings are often very indefinite, however the female is more distinctly marked.

== Habitat and hosts ==
Larvae of this species have been collected from spun up leaves of Discaria toumatou.
