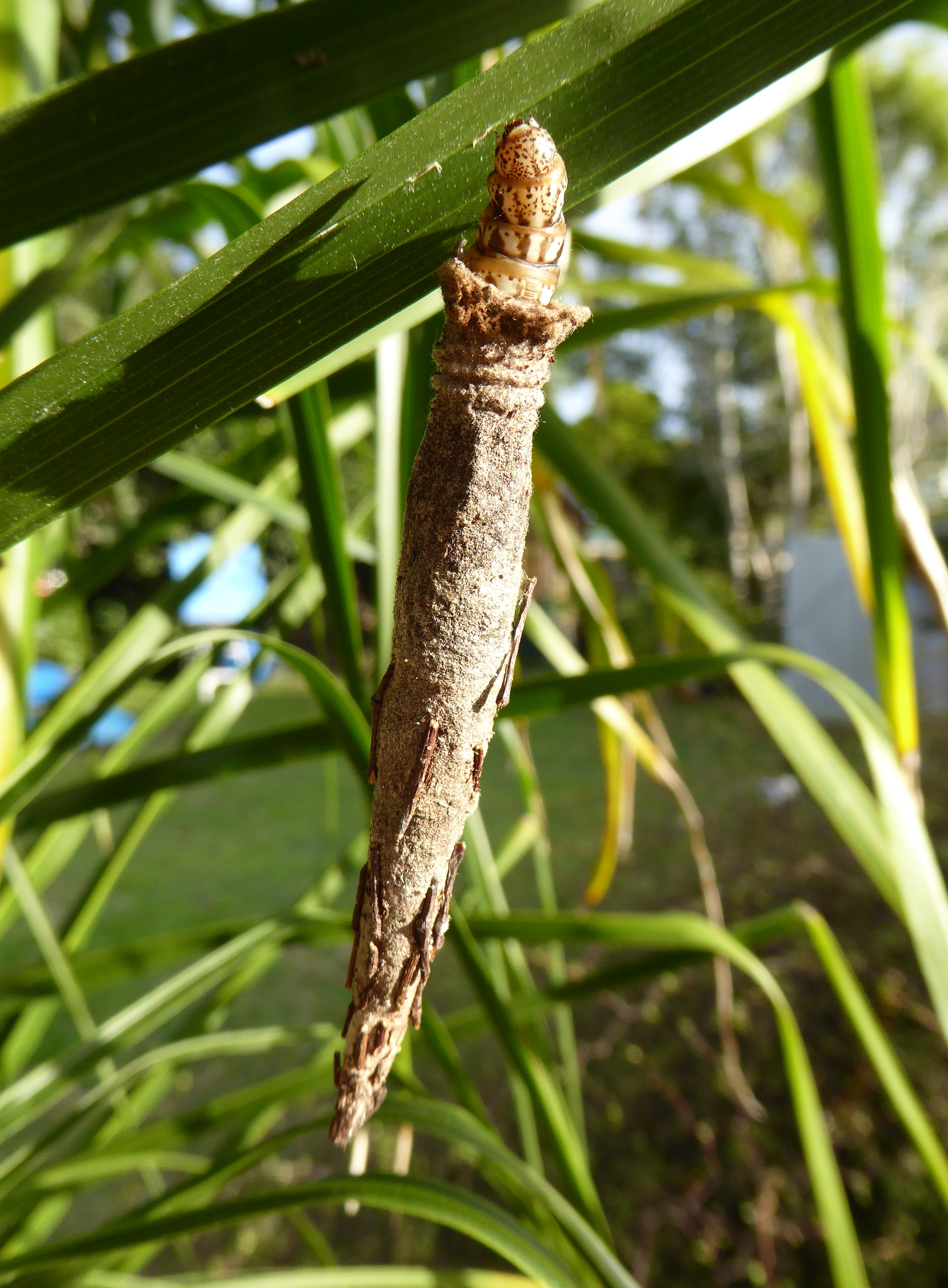
- Liothula omnivora caterpillar

Scientific classification
- Kingdom: Animalia
- Phylum: Arthropoda
- Class: Insecta
- Order: Lepidoptera
- Family: Psychidae
- Genus: Liothula
- Species: L. omnivora

Binomial name
- Liothula omnivora Fereday, 1878

Synonyms
- Oeceticus omnivorous Hudson, 1928

= Liothula omnivora =

Species of moth

Liothula omnivora, the common bag moth, is a psychid moth endemic to New Zealand. It is also known by several Māori vernacular names like the tūngou ngou, whare atua ('house of the spirit') or kopi ('shut').

There are over 50 species of Psychidae and at least two species of Liothula in New Zealand.

== Taxonomy ==
This species was described by Richard William Fereday in 1878. In 1928 George Hudson placed this species within the Oeceticus genus and amended its epithet to omnivorous. However this was not accepted by other taxonomists.

== Caterpillar and bag ==
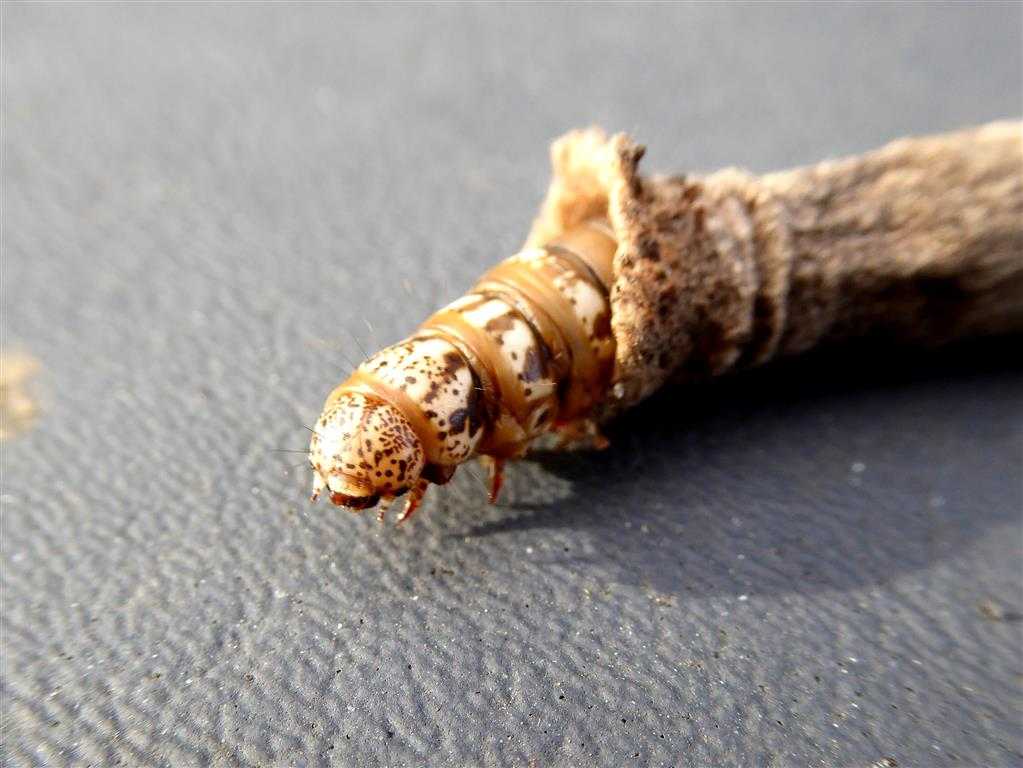
Liothula omnivora caterpillar

Like other bagworms, L. omnivora caterpillars construct and live within a small, mobile, tapering bag of silk, which provides camouflage and protection to the caterpillar. The bag is lengthened at the broad or mouth end as the caterpillar grows. The caterpillar secures itself within the bag using hooks on its anterior prolegs, allowing it to extend the head and thorax while dragging the bag behind it. When threatened, it quickly retreats into the bag and draws the mouth tightly closed. The caterpillar begins construction of its bag within a few days of hatching. Initially the bag is held erect, but as the caterpillar grows larger the bag trails behind and beneath the insect.

The exterior of the bag is often decorated with small leaf and bark fragments. The quantity and placement of these fragments indicates the sex of the caterpillar - females have few fragments and mostly placed towards the narrow end of the bag, whilst males attach many fragments along the length of the bag.

The caterpillar itself has a black or brown and white speckled head and thorax, with the remainder of the body being plain brown. Female caterpillars grow larger, with the average bag of pupal females measuring 45 mm compared to pupal male bags averaging 42 mm.

As the scientific name suggests, the caterpillars of L. omnivora feed on a very wide range of native and exotic broad-leaved and coniferous shrubs and trees, which they feed on at night.

== Pupa and adult ==
Pupation usually occurs during winter. When ready to pupate, L. omnivora permanently secures the bag to a twig using a wide band of silk or to larger surfaces by a mat of many short lengths of silk. They then close both ends and add an extra lining of silk to the interior, and then pupate within the bag.

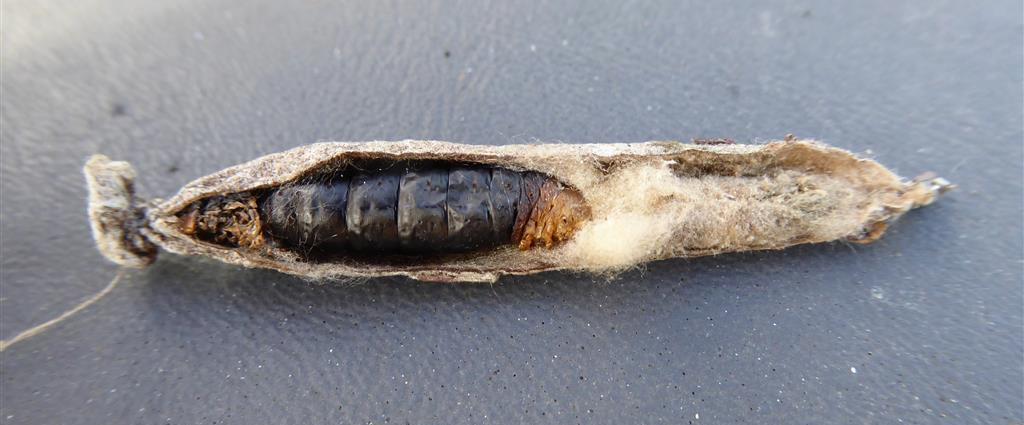
Pupal case cut open to reveal the pupa and extra silk lining

Only the male metamorphoses into a recognisable moth. The adult female never leaves the bag and has no wings, merely an abdomen and rudimentary head and thorax.

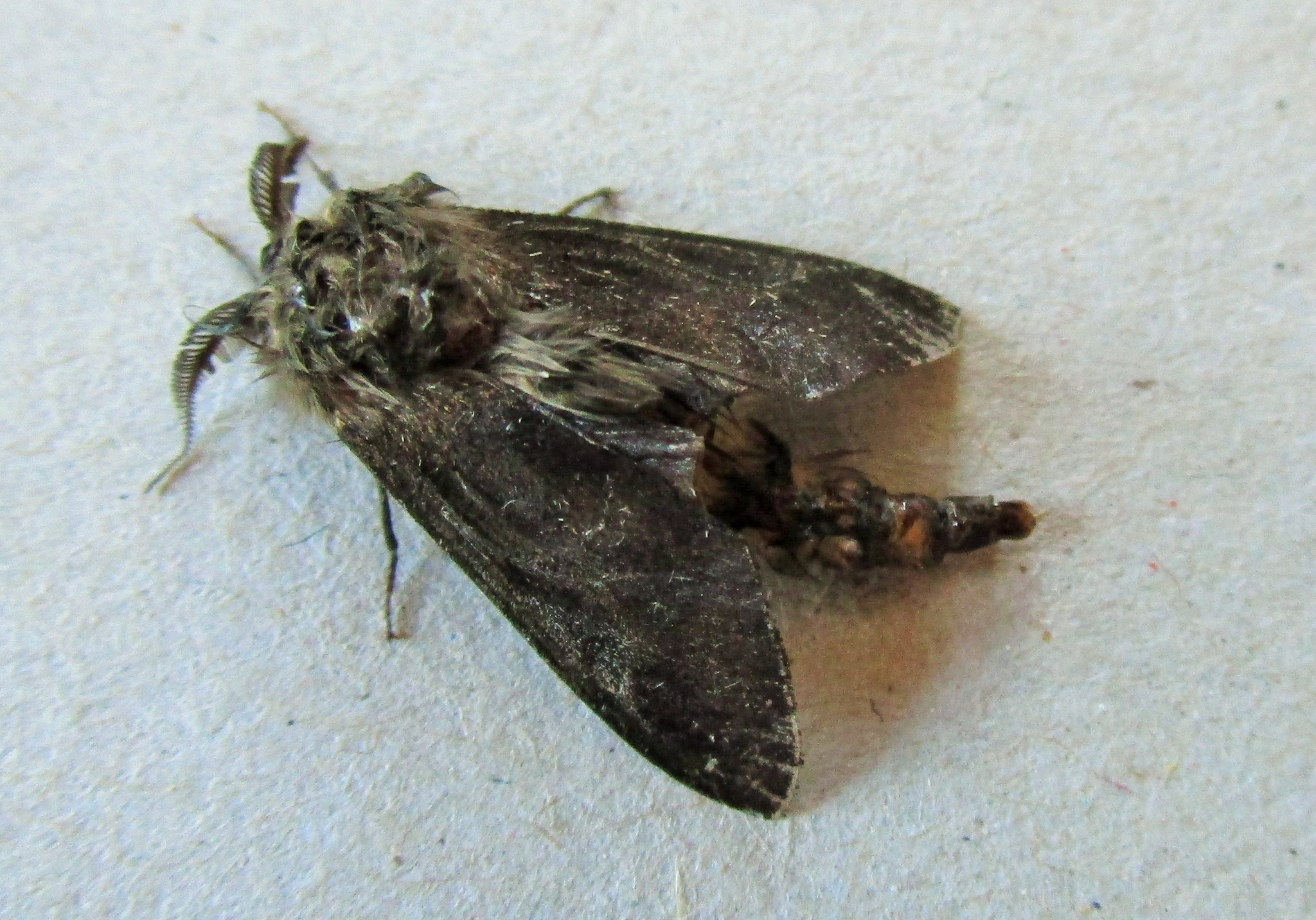
Adult male

The male is a hairy, black moth with translucent wings and a tapered abdomen and a 28–38 mm wingspan.

Males usually emerge from the pupa in the early morning. When ready to emerge, the male pupa forces its way to the narrow exit of the bag and extends the front part of the body through the hole. Held in place by spines on the abdomen, the pupa then splits and the adult male emerges. He then clings to the bag while the wings expand and harden. When mating, the male inserts the telescopic end of his abdomen through the narrow end of the female's bag. She lays her eggs within the bag and dies. The caterpillars emerge through the narrow end of the female's bag and disperse via crawling, lowering themselves on silk threads or by wind.

The male of this species is attracted to light and have been collected via a mercury vapour light trap.

== Parasites ==
Liothula omnivora caterpillars are commonly attacked by tachinid flies and also ichneumonid wasps.

Tachinids, primarily Pales feredayi and P. marginata, lay their eggs on foliage which are then ingested by the bagworm caterpillar. The maggots then eat through the gut wall and feed on the caterpillar, leaving the host's body when it dies and pupating within the bag. Remains of the grubs and their brown puparia are often found inside cases, alongside the remains of the caterpillar. The tachinid larvae are in turn eaten by another parasitoid wasp, which bites small, round emergence holes in the side of the bag.

Parasitoid ichneumonid wasps known to attack L. omnivora include the white-spotted ichneumonid Ecthromorpha intricatoria (Fereday), Xanthopimpla rhopaloceros (Krieger) and Paraphylax species. E. intricatoria parasitises various Lepidopteran pupae, but the adult is unable to escape from the bag of L. omnivora. X. rhopaloceros was released in New Zealand in the 1960s as a biocontrol agent against the light brown apple moth but was not sufficiently host-specific to have much impact.

== Relationship with humans ==
The cocoon produced by the moth is said in Māori belief to have been a transformation of Raukatauri, the Māori goddess of music. This inspires both the traditional flute instrument pūtōrino and another name given to the insect, pū a Raukatauri or 'flute of Raukatauri'.
