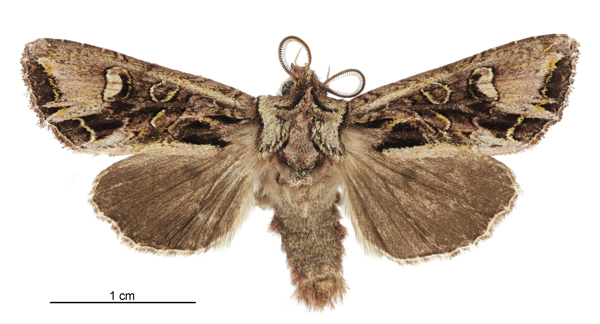
- Male
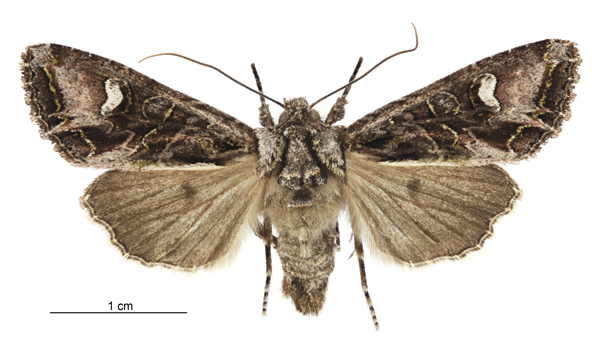
- Female

Scientific classification
- Kingdom: Animalia
- Phylum: Arthropoda
- Clade: Pancrustacea
- Class: Insecta
- Order: Lepidoptera
- Superfamily: Noctuoidea
- Family: Noctuidae
- Genus: Ichneutica
- Species: I. insignis

Binomial name
- Ichneutica insignis (Walker, 1865)

Synonyms
- Euplexia insignis Walker, 1865; Xylina turbida Walker, 1865; Mamestra angusta Felder & Rogenhofer, 1875; Mamestra polychroa Meyrick, 1887; Melanchra xanthogramma Meyrick, 1912; Graphania insignis (Walker, 1865)

= Ichneutica insignis =

Species of moth

Ichneutica insignis is a moth of the family Noctuidae. It is endemic to and found throughout New Zealand, although it appears to be scarce at inland sites of tussock grasslands. The adults are on the wing throughout the year. It is a variable species and as such can be easily confused with I. skelloni and I. plena. The larvae of this species have been recorded as feeding on Trifolium pratense.

== Taxonomy ==
This species was first scientifically described by Francis Walker in 1865 using a specimen collected by T. R. Oxley. Although the original scientific description states the specimen originated in Auckland, the correct type locality is in Nelson. Walker originally named the species Euplexia insignis. The lectotype specimen is held at the Natural History Museum, London. In 1988 J. S. Dugdale, in his catalogue of New Zealand Lepidoptera, placed this species within the Graphania genus. In 2019 Robert Hoare undertook a major review of New Zealand Noctuidae species. During this review the genus Ichneutica was greatly expanded and the genus Graphania was subsumed into that genus as a synonym. As a result of this review, this species is now known as Ichneutica insignis.

== Description ==
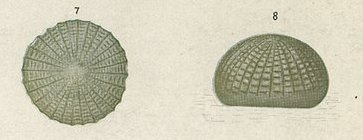
Illustration of egg of I. insignis

George Hudson describes the eggs of this species as follows:

The egg is semi-globose, considerably flattened above and beneath. A number of branching ribs radiate from the micropyle, the spaces between them being slightly ribbed transversely. Its colour is pale green, becoming dark brown in the centre as the enclosed embryo develops.

Larvae start their lives coloured pale brown with numerous black warts emitting black bristles. After about twelve days the larvae turn a pale green and after moulting, lateral and subdorsal lines begin to appear.

Hudson describes the fully mature larva of this species is as follows:

A full grown larva is pale greenish-brown, inclining to yellow on the ventral surface. There lateral lines consist of a series of black markings near the posterior margin of each segment; the subdorsal lines are represented by four oblique black marks on each side of the four posterior segments of the larva. The region between these lines is much clouded with yellowish green or pink, the larva having a tendency to diverge into pink and green varieties. The anal segment is dull yellow. The head is brown, with two black stripes and several black dots.

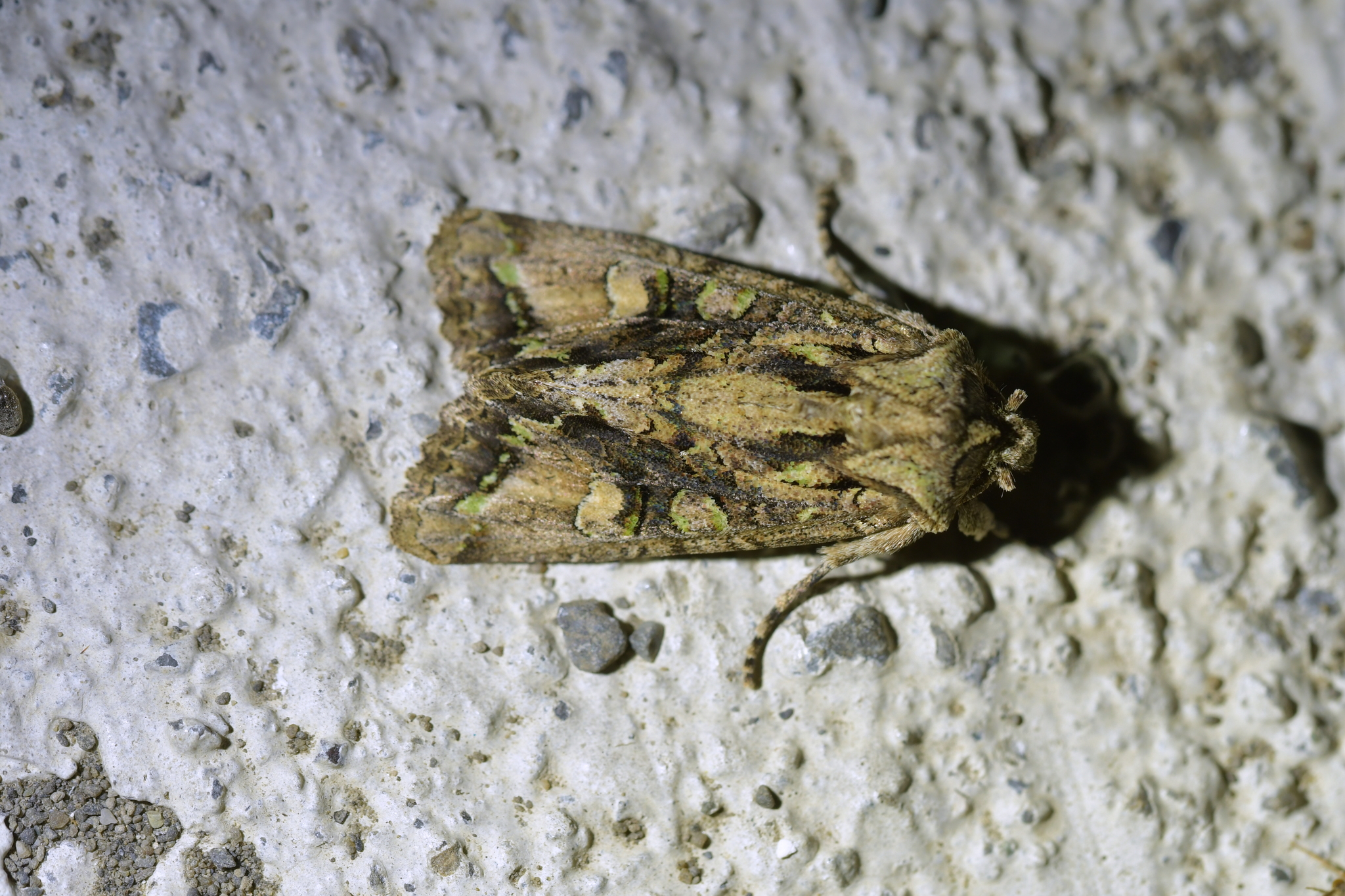
Ichneutica insignis

Walker described the adults of this species as follows:

Male and female. Ferruginous-cinereous. Palpi stout, obliquely ascending, not rising so high as the vertex; third joint conical, very minute, not more than one-eighth of the length of the second. Antennae of the male very slightly pectinated for full two-thirds of the length. Fore tegulae of the thorax with a black band, which is curved on each side. Abdomen brownish, extending somewhat beyond the hind wings, crested towards the base, reddish on each side and with a small reddish apical tuft in the male. Fore wings varied with glaucous-cinereous and with blackish, the former hue forming an irregular and interrupted submarginal band, which extends along the costa in three streaks to the exterior border; some zigzag black lines; orbicular and reniform marks of the usual shape; the first bordered with pale cinereous; the second wholly pale cinereous; fringe with pale cinereous longitudinal streaks. Hind wings brown. Length of the body 7 — 8 lines; of the wings 18— 20 lines.

I. insignis is variable in appearance and as a result is difficult to distinguish from its close relatives I. skelloni and I. plena. The pectinations on the antennae of the male I. insignis are longer than those on I. skelloni. The dorsum of the forewings of some specimens of I. insignis often has a "distinct whitish suffusion" which is considered diagnostic. This feature is lacking in I. plena specimens and although a similar pale marking may also occur in I. skelloni specimens the colour is not whitish.

== Distribution ==
This species can be found throughout New Zealand.

== Habitat ==
Although this species can be found in a variety of habitats throughout the country it is scarce or absent from inland sites of tussock grassland.

== Behaviour ==
Adults of this species can be found on the wing throughout the year. The adults moths are attracted to light. They have been collected via a mercury vapour light trap. The sex pheromones used by I. insignis consist of combinations of tetradecenyl and dodecenyl acetates or alcohols.

== Life cycle and host species ==
The larvae of this species emerge from eggs after about two weeks. Larvae of I. insignis can feed on various plants but have been recorded as feeding on Trifolium pratense.
