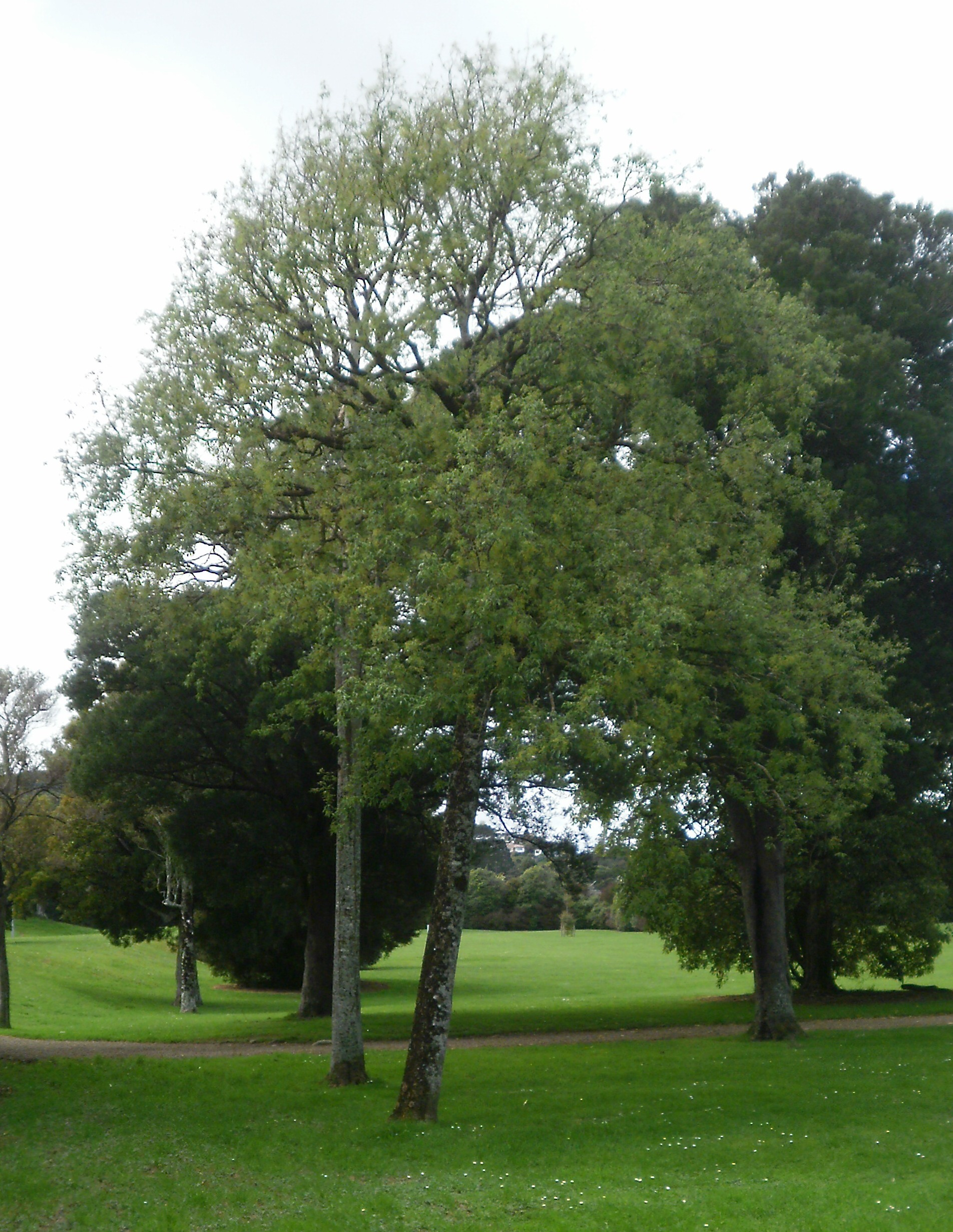

Conservation status
- Least Concern (IUCN 3.1)

Scientific classification
- Kingdom: Plantae
- Clade: Embryophytes
- Clade: Tracheophytes
- Clade: Spermatophytes
- Clade: Angiosperms
- Clade: Eudicots
- Clade: Rosids
- Order: Malvales
- Family: Malvaceae
- Genus: Plagianthus
- Species: P. regius

Binomial name
- Plagianthus regius (Poit.) Hochr. (1907)

= Plagianthus regius =

Ribbonwood/manatu

Species of tree

Plagianthus regius or lowland ribbonwood is a tree that is endemic to New Zealand. The common name is simply ribbonwood. The Māori name is mānatu but it is also known as manaui mānatu.

The juvenile form has bushy interlacing branches with small leaves, while an older tree will tend to have larger leaves, sometimes with the lower parts of tree still displaying divaricating leaves. A profusion of small white or green flowers appear in dense clusters in spring making it easier to distinguish from the similar lacebark genus. One of the distinctive aspects of this tree is that it is usually deciduous which is unusual for New Zealand, although in the northern areas it can be semi-deciduous. It is considered the largest of New Zealand's deciduous trees growing to 17 metres, and grows in the North, South and Stewart Islands. A subspecies from the Chatham Islands, Plagianthus regius subsp. chathamicus, is very similar but lacks the divaricating aspect.

The bark of the tree was used in Māori traditional textiles such as in fishing nets.

== See also ==
- Flora of New Zealand
