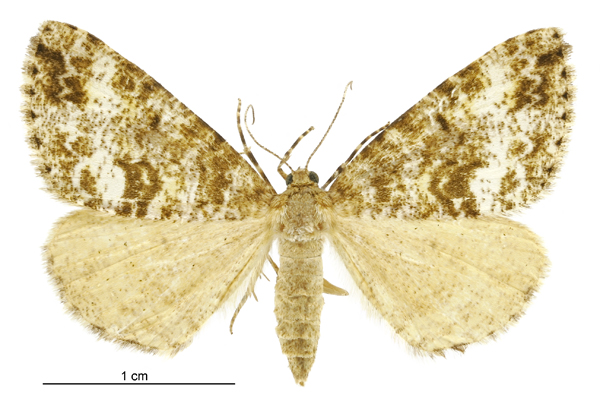
- Female
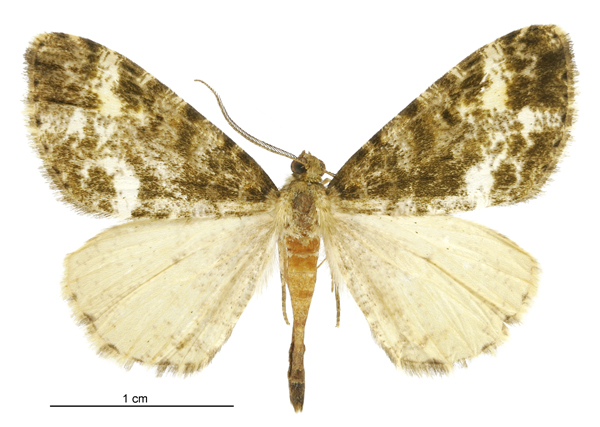
- Male

Scientific classification
- Kingdom: Animalia
- Phylum: Arthropoda
- Clade: Pancrustacea
- Class: Insecta
- Order: Lepidoptera
- Family: Geometridae
- Genus: Pseudocoremia
- Species: P. lactiflua

Binomial name
- Pseudocoremia lactiflua (Meyrick, 1912)

Synonyms
- Selidosema lactiflua Meyrick, 1912

= Pseudocoremia lactiflua =

Species of moth endemic to New Zealand

Pseudocoremia lactiflua is a species of moth in the family Geometridae. It was first described by Edward Meyrick in 1912. This species is endemic to New Zealand and has been observed in the South Island. This species inhabits native forest and the adults are on the wing from December until March. They are nocturnal and are attracted to light. Larvae feed on species in the plant genus Hoheria.

== Taxonomy ==
This species was first described by Edward Meyrick in 1912 and originally named Selidosema lactiflua. George Hudson discussed and illustrated this species in his 1928 book The butterflies and moths of New Zealand under that name. The male lectotype, collected at the Routeburn Valley near Lake Wakatipu by Hudson, is held at the Natural History Museum, London.

== Description ==
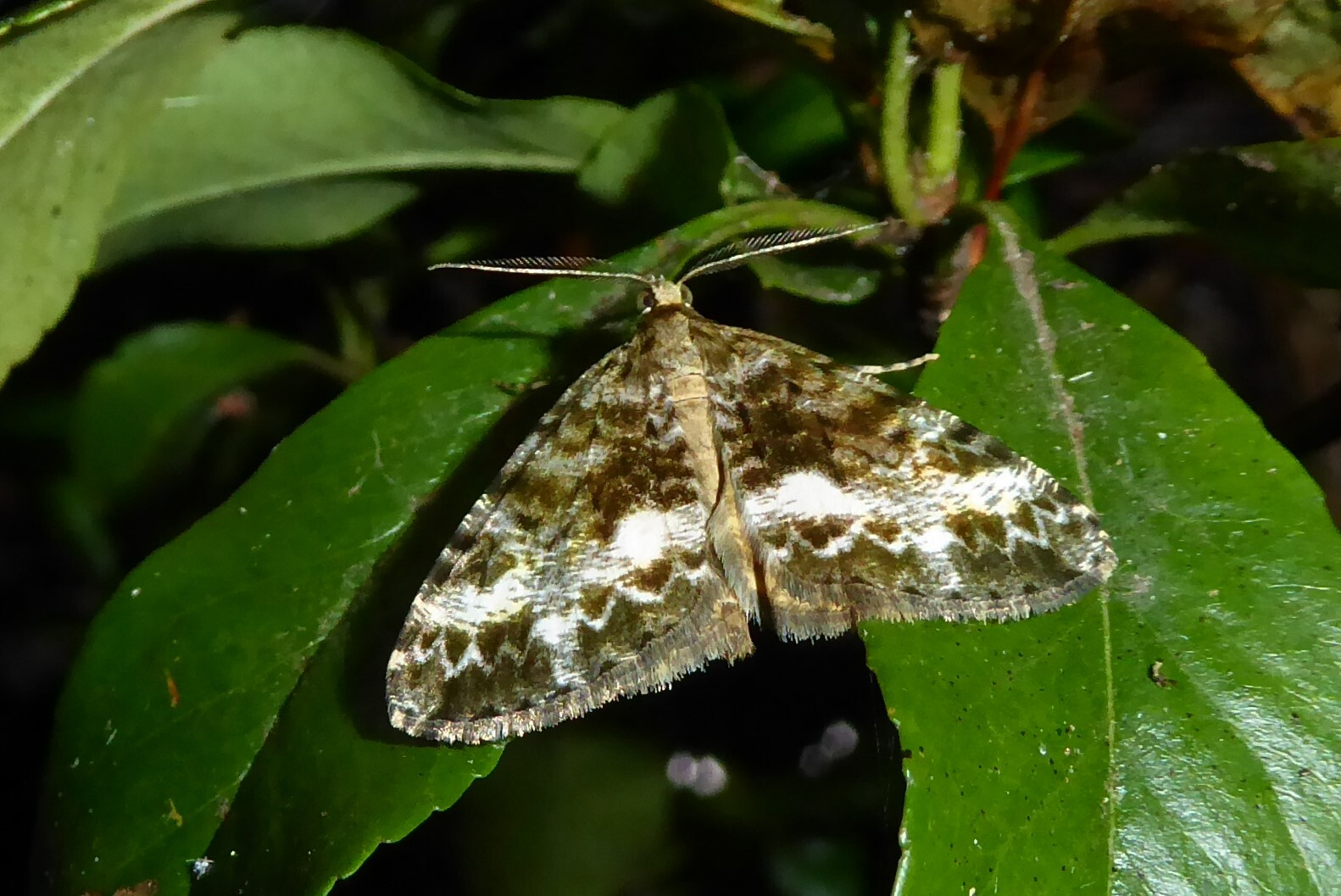
P. lactiflua at rest.

Meyrick described this species as follows:

♂. 36 mm. Head and thorax olive-greenish mixed with yellow-whitish. Antennal pectinations, a 6, b 5 ; about 8 apical joints simple. Abdomen whitish-yellowish. Forewings triangular, costa slightly arched apex rounded-obtuse, termen evenly rounded, rather oblique ; 10 and 11 separate ; olive-greenish, sprinkled with blackish ; costal area strigulated with white from 1/4 to 3/4 ; lines formed by blackish suffusion, first and second double, waved, first somewhat curved, second slightly and rather irregularly curved, somewhat sinuate inwards towards dorsum, median thick, somewhat curved ; a blackish transverse discal mark beyond median line ; second line followed by a white band strigulated with olive-greenish ; subterminal line slender, waved, white, preceded and followed by blackish suffusion tending to form spots ; a terminal series of black lunulate marks : cilia pale olive-greenish, sometimes sprinkled with blackish, narrowly and obscurely barred with white. Hind wings whitish-yellow-ochreous, towards dorsum and termen sometimes finely and slightly sprinkled with grey ; a grey discal dot, sometimes faint ; a terminal series of slight dark-grey marks ; cilia whitish-ochreous-yellow.

== Distribution ==
P. lactiflua is endemic to New Zealand and is found in the South Island.

== Habitat and hosts ==
The species inhabits native forest. The larval plant hosts of this moth are species in the genus Hoheria.

== Behaviour ==
Adults of this species are nocturnal and is attracted to light. They have been observed on the wing from December until April.
