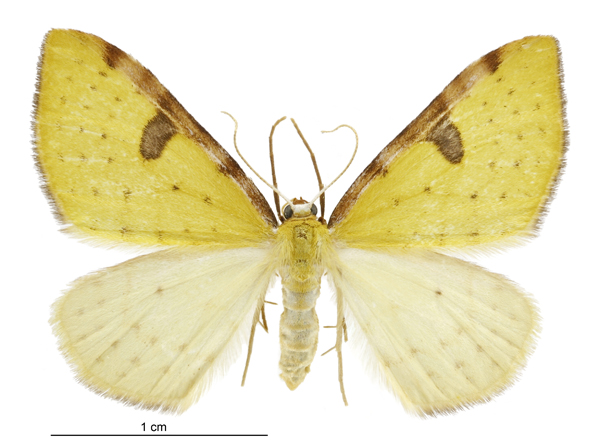
- Female
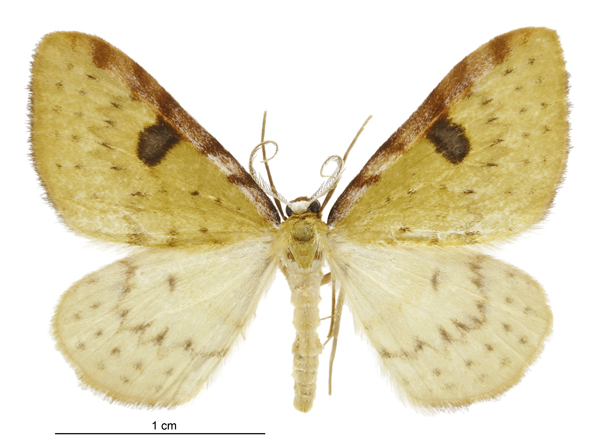
- Male

Scientific classification
- Kingdom: Animalia
- Phylum: Arthropoda
- Class: Insecta
- Order: Lepidoptera
- Family: Geometridae
- Genus: Epiphryne
- Species: E. xanthaspis

Binomial name
- Epiphryne xanthaspis (Meyrick, 1883)

Synonyms
- Hermione xanthaspis Meyrick, 1883; Aulopola xanthaspis (Meyrick, 1883); Venusia xanthaspis (Meyrick, 1883)

= Epiphryne xanthaspis =

Species of moth endemic to New Zealand

Epiphryne xanthaspis, also known as the Aristotelia Looper, is a moth in the family Geometridae. This species was first described by Edward Meyrick in 1883. It is endemic to New Zealand and can be found from the central North Island southward to the bottom of the South Island. The preferred habitat of this species is sub-alpine native forest. The larval hosts of E. xanthaspis are plants in the genus Aristotelia and include Aristotelia fruticosa. Adults are on the wing from December until March.

== Taxonomy ==
This species was first described by Edward Meyrick in 1883 using specimens collected at Lake Guyon by R. W. Fereday and named Hermione xanthaspis. Meyrick gave a fuller description of the species in 1884. In 1886 Meyrick renamed the genus in to which he had previously assigned this species Aulopola. George Hudson described and illustrated this species both in his 1898 book New Zealand moths and butterflies (Macro-lepidoptera) as well as in his 1928 book The butterflies and moths of New Zealand. In both publications Hudson used the name Venusia xanthaspis for this species. In 1988 J. S. Dugdale discussed this species under the name Epiphryne xanthaspis. The male lectotype specimen is held at the Natural History Museum, London.

== Description ==
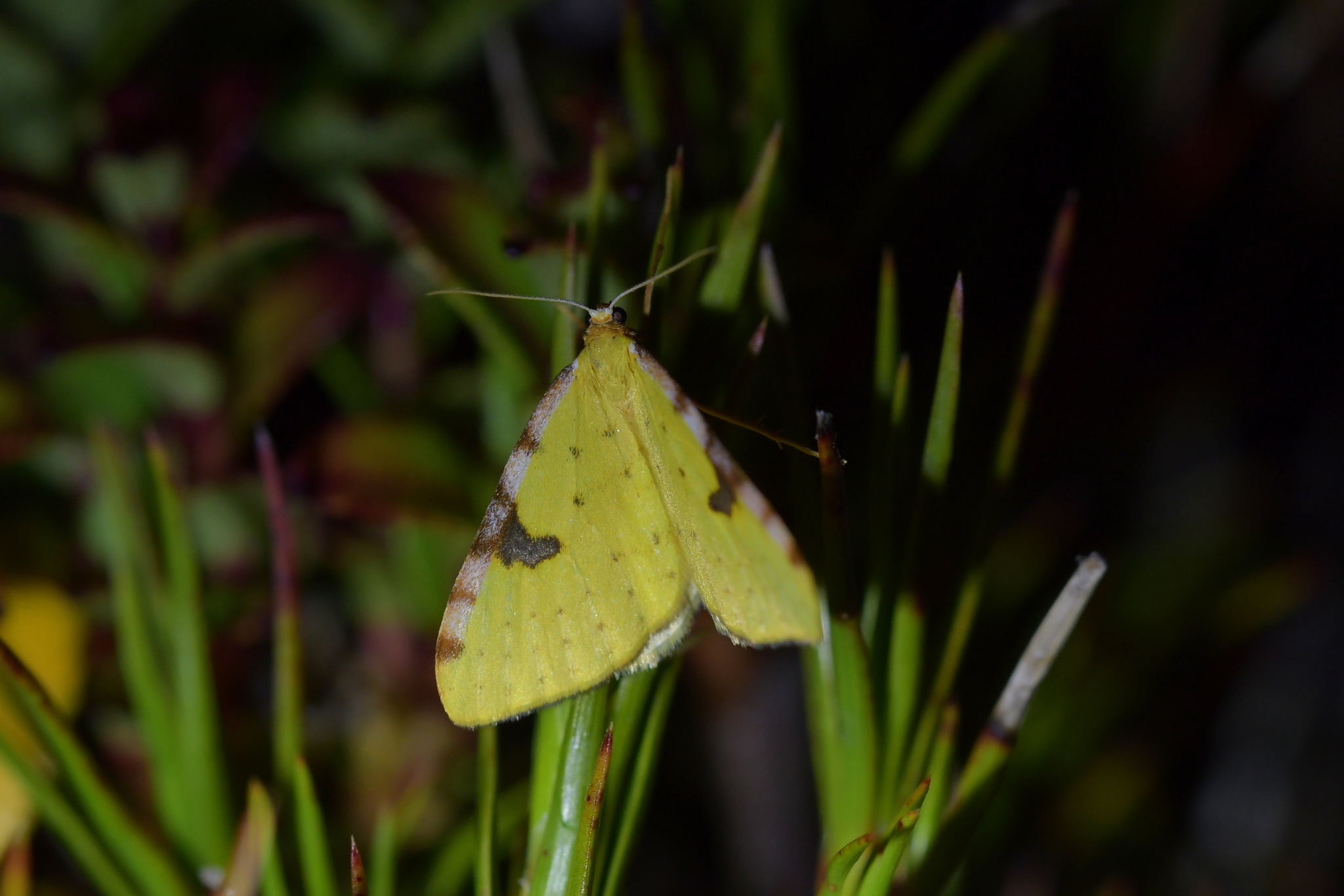
Observation of E. xanthaspis.

Meyrick described this species as follows:

Male, female.—27–30 mm. Forewings moderate; hindmargin hardly bowed; bright yellow; costa suffused with reddish-fuscous, and marked with five short oblique darker marks; a transverse oval dark fuscous spot in disc above middle, sometimes touching costal suffusion; a transverse row of very faint fuscous dots from last costal mark. Hindwings moderate, hindmargin slightly projecting in middle; very pale whitish-yellow; two strongly curved transverse rows of very faint fuscous dots between middle and hindmargin.

== Distribution ==
Epiphryne xanthaspis is endemic to New Zealand and can be found from the central North Island south. As well as its type locality, this species has been observed at Mount Ruapehu and in the Tararua Ranges in the North Island as well as at Mount Arthur, Otira, and the Routeburn Valley.

== Habitat and hosts ==
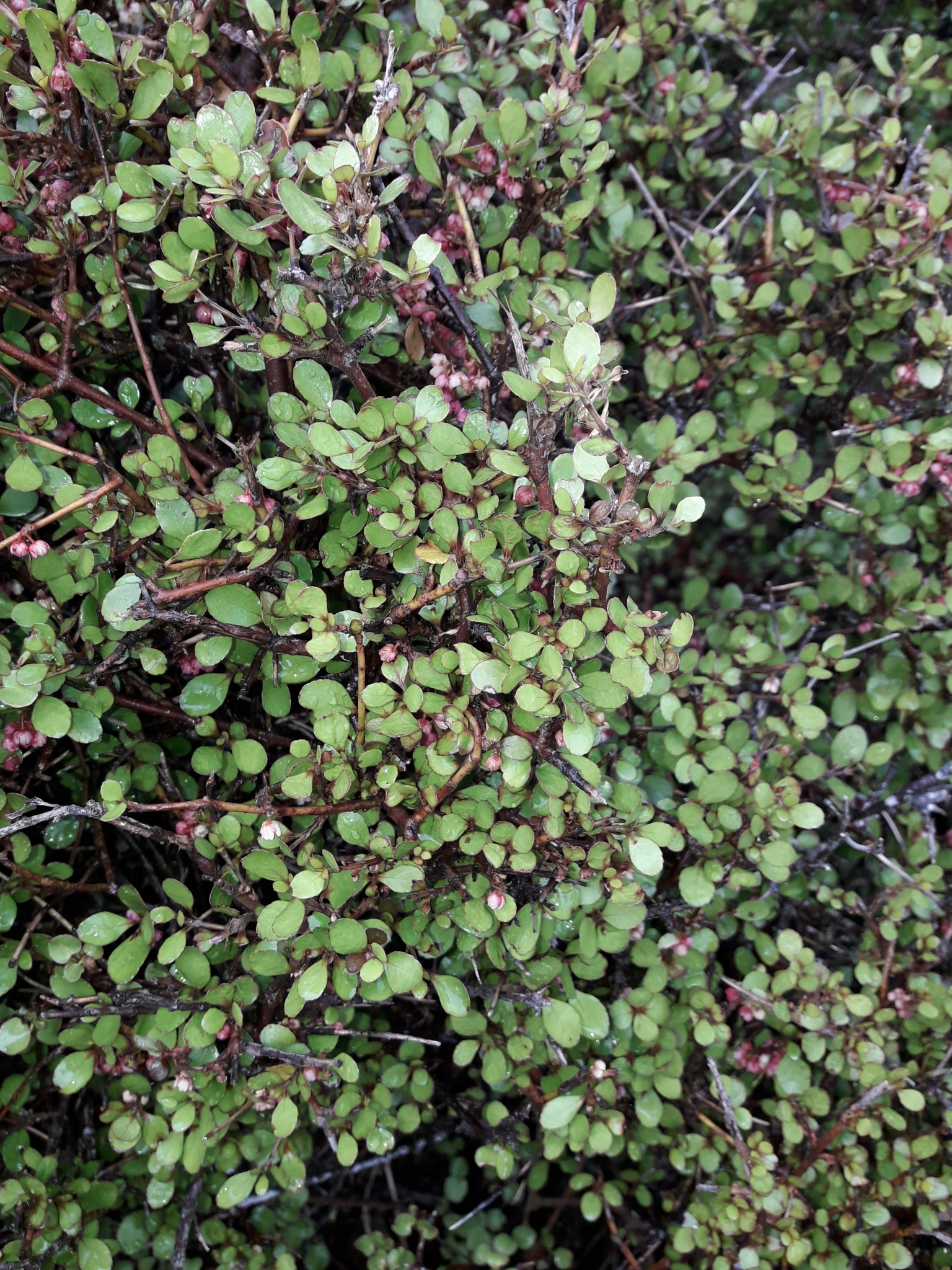
Larval host plant Aristotelia fruticosa.

The preferred habitat of this species is sub-alpine native forest. The larval hosts of E. xanthaspis are plant species in the genus Aristotelia and include Aristotelia fruticosa. Adult moths have been recorded as pollinating the flowers of Olearia virgata.

== Behaviour ==
The adults of this species are on the wing from December to March. Adults are regarded as being 'medium fliers' with intermedia flight powers and remain active in light breezes. Adults are attracted to light.
