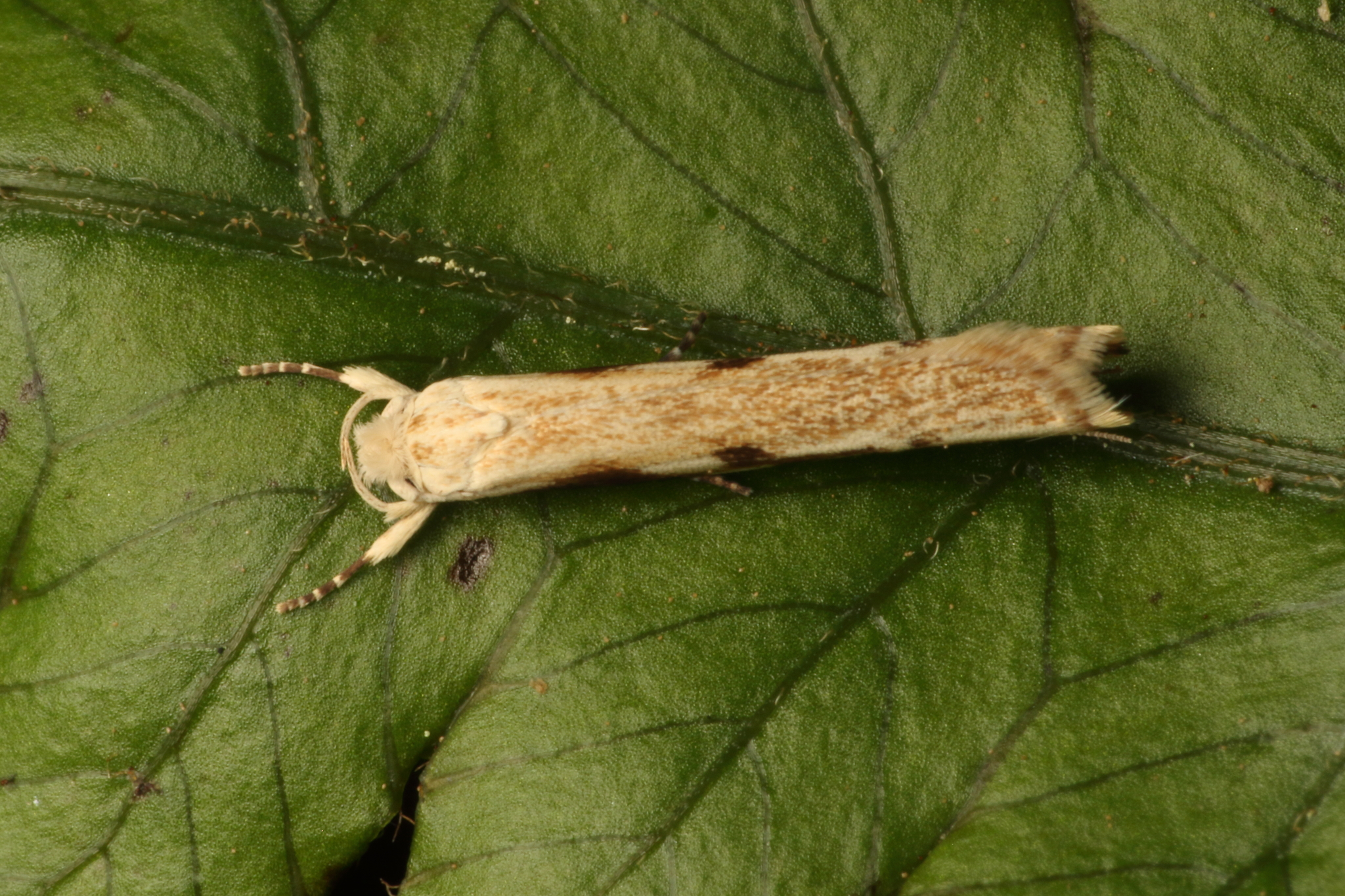

Scientific classification
- Kingdom: Animalia
- Phylum: Arthropoda
- Clade: Pancrustacea
- Class: Insecta
- Order: Lepidoptera
- Family: Plutellidae
- Genus: Dolichernis
- Species: D. chloroleuca

Binomial name
- Dolichernis chloroleuca Meyrick, 1891

= Dolichernis chloroleuca =

Species of moth endemic to New Zealand

Dolichernis chloroleuca is a moth of the family Plutellidae. It was first described by Edward Meyrick in 1891. It is endemic to New Zealand and has been observed in the North and South Islands. The species inhabits native forest. The larvae of this species mine the leaves of Aristotelia serrata and Elaeocarpus dentatus. Adults are on the wing from February to March and October to December. They are attracted to light.

== Taxonomy ==
This species was first described by Edward Meyrick in 1891 using a female specimen. In 1927 Alfred Philpott examined the male genitalia of this species. George Hudson discussed and illustrated this species under that name in his 1928 book The butterflies and moths of New Zealand. The female holotype, collected in Wellington by Hudson, is held at the Natural History Museum, London.

== Description ==
Illustration by Hudson

Meyrick described this species as follows:

♀. 16 mm. Head, palpi, antennae, thorax, abdomen, and legs ochreons-whitish ; anterior and middle legs banded with dark fuscous. Forewings elongate, rather narrow, costa moderately arched, apex tolerably pointed, hindmargin slightly sinuate, oblique ; pale whitish-ochreous, with a few scattered fuscous scales ; a cloudy irregular elongate dark fuscous dot beneath costa near base, two obliquely placed in disc at 1/4, four forming a straight oblique series from middle of disc to before middle of inner margin, and two transversely placed in disc above anal angle: cilia ochreous-whitish, with a small black spot at apex. Hindwings and cilia whitish.

Hudson pointed out that the species is variable in appearance with some specimens being almost white with the markings nearly obliterated while in others the costal and dorsal portions of the fore-wings are thickly sprinkled with pale brown, or golden-ochreous scales.

== Distribution ==
This species is endemic to New Zealand. It has been observed in the North and South Islands.

== Habitat and hosts ==
Larvae mining A. serrata leaf.

This species inhabits native forest. The larvae of this species mine the leaves of Aristotelia serrata and Elaeocarpus dentatus.

== Behaviour ==
Adults are on the wing from February to March and October to December. They are attracted to black light.

Adults have been observed resting on the upper sides of fern fronds and other foliage, often fully exposed to view. When adults are at rest the wings are rolled around the body; the hind- and intermediate legs are withdrawn and used for standing; the anterior legs are extended and the palpi arched around the head, with their tips almost in contact in front. The antennae are placed backwards close to the body and are almost invisible. In assuming this position the moth resembles to a small, whitish-coloured dead stick. This appearance protects the moth from predators.
