= Aristotelia =

Aristotelia may refer to:

- Aristotelia (plant), a genus of trees in the family Elaeocarpaceae
- Aristotelia (moth), a genus of moths in the family Gelechiidae
