= Makomako =

Makomako may refer to:

- Aristotelia serrata (wineberry), a tree
- New Zealand bellbird
- A minor settlement and stream near Aotea Harbour, in the Waikato region of New Zealand
