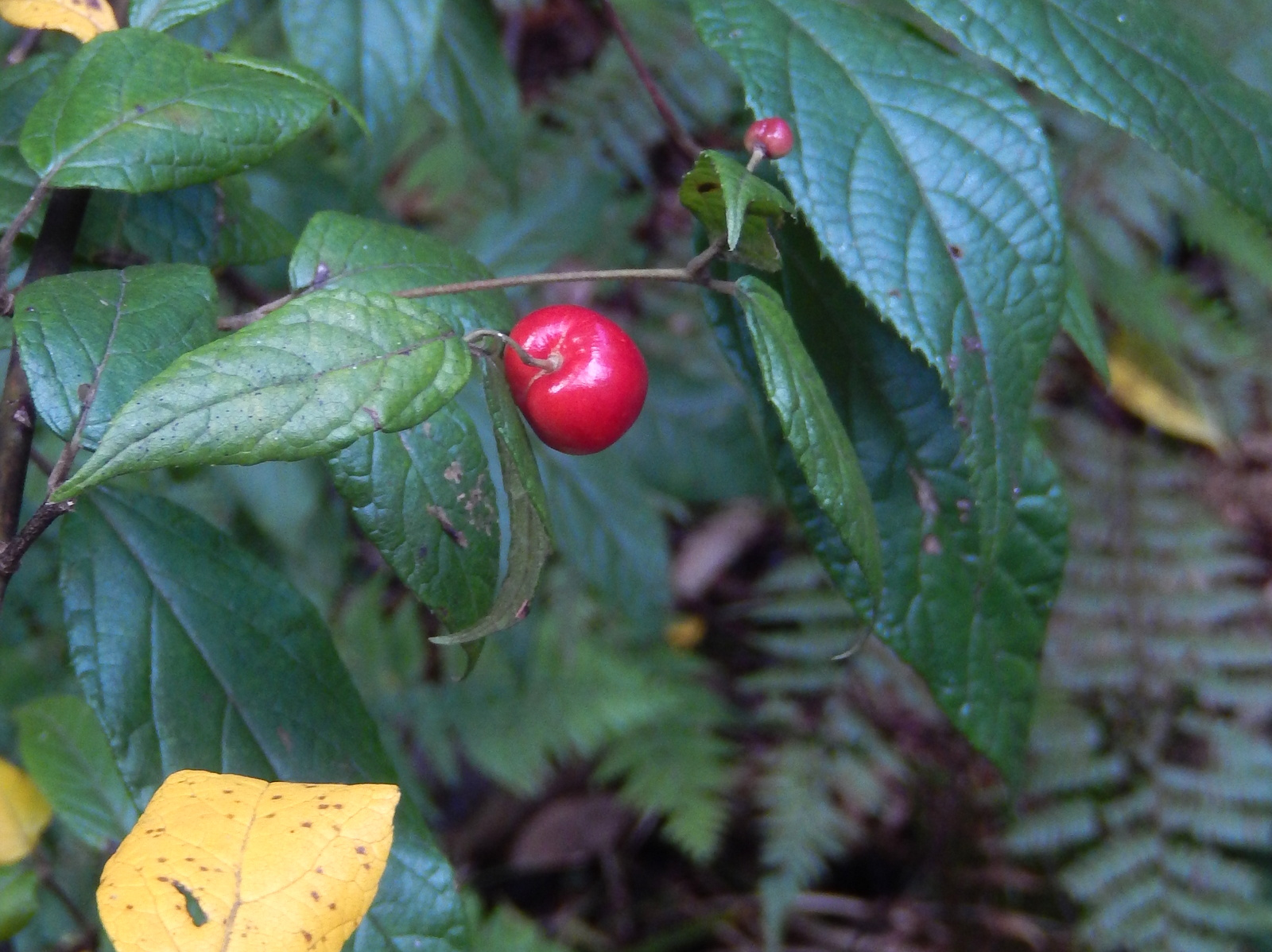
- At Werrikimbe National Park

Scientific classification
- Kingdom: Plantae
- Clade: Tracheophytes
- Clade: Angiosperms
- Clade: Eudicots
- Clade: Rosids
- Order: Oxalidales
- Family: Elaeocarpaceae
- Genus: Aristotelia
- Species: A. australasica

Binomial name
- Aristotelia australasica F.Muell.

= Aristotelia australasica =

Mountain wineberry

Species of flowering plant

Aristotelia australasica, the mountain wineberry, is a shrub in the family Elaeocarpaceae. It grows in or near cool rainforest areas in northern New South Wales, Australia.
