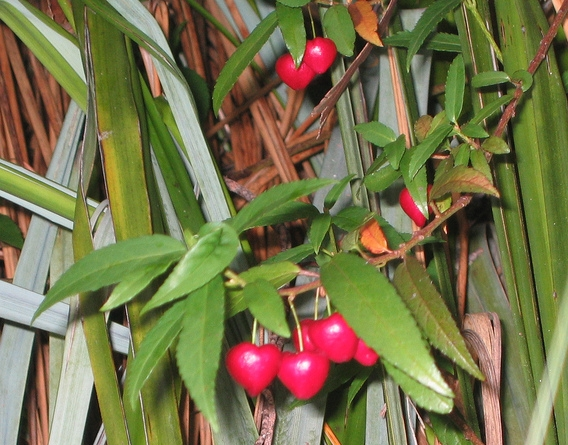

Scientific classification
- Kingdom: Plantae
- Clade: Tracheophytes
- Clade: Angiosperms
- Clade: Eudicots
- Clade: Rosids
- Order: Oxalidales
- Family: Elaeocarpaceae
- Genus: Aristotelia
- Species: A. peduncularis

Binomial name
- Aristotelia peduncularis (Labill.) Hook.f.

Synonyms
- Elaeocarpus peduncularis Labill.; Friesia peduncularis Labill.

= Aristotelia peduncularis =

Species of flowering plant

Aristotelia peduncularis, also known as heartberry, is a shrub in the family Elaeocarpaceae, endemic to the wet forests of Tasmania.

== Description ==
Aristotelia peduncularis is a straggly woody monoecious shrub with slender arching branches reaching up to 1.5 metres in height.

Leaves vary in size from 2 to 7 centimetres and are generally ovate to lanceolate with toothed margins, though they may occasionally be deeply lobed. They are held opposite, alternate, or in whorls of three.

Flowers occur in summer and are hermaphroditic, white and campanulate, held singly (or sometimes in a group of 2–3) from long peduncles at axils. Each petal is triple-lobed, forming a fringe, and the inside of the flower may have some pink-purple markings.

The fruit is a fleshy, roughly heart-shaped berry, ranging in colour from deep purple-black through to red, pink and white.

== Distribution ==
This species is found only, but is widespread, within Tasmania, occurring more commonly in the south. It can be found in relative abundance in the understorey of wet forests where conditions are consistently moist and shady, often on mountain slopes and in fern gullies (60–600m).
