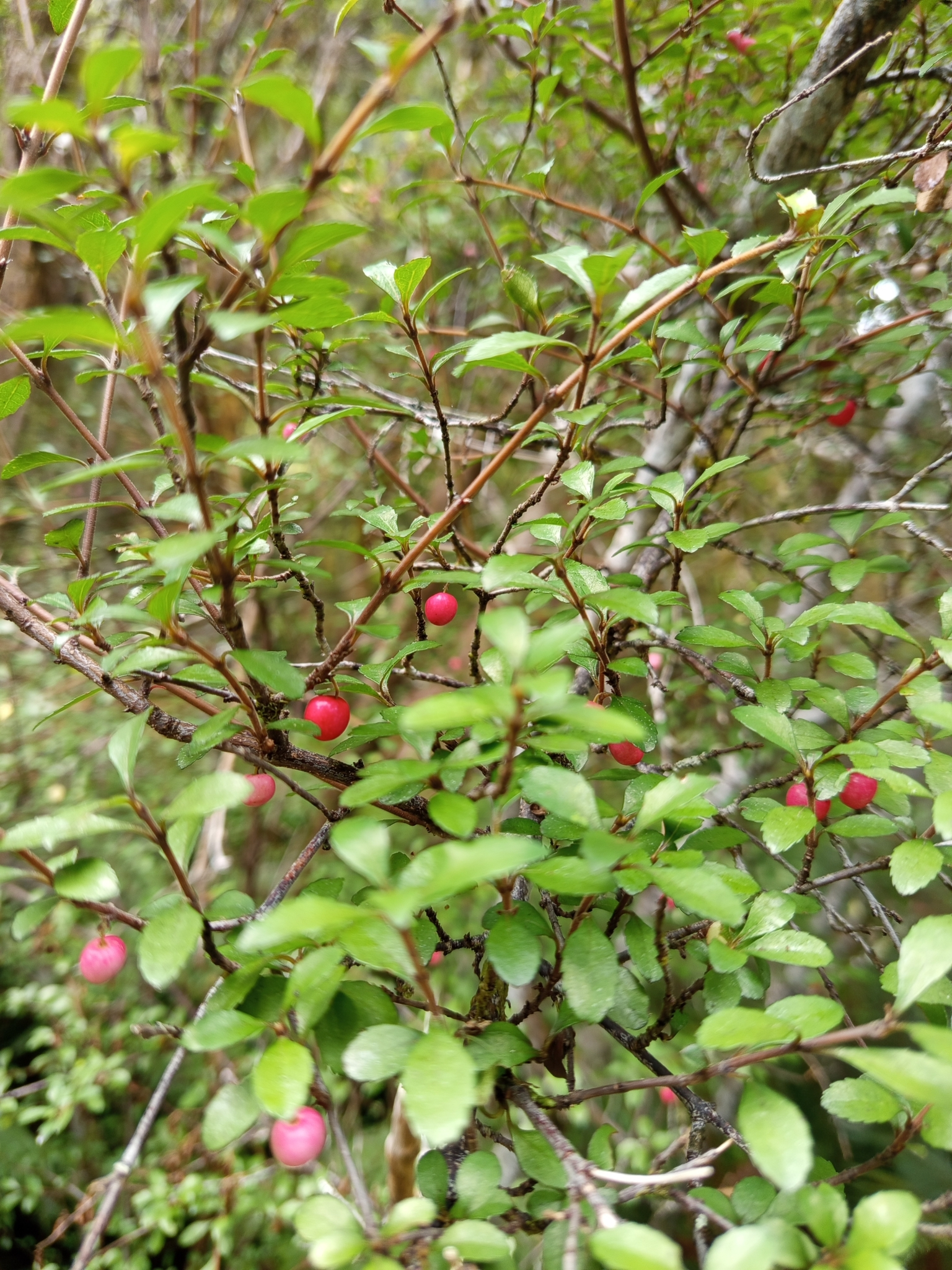

Scientific classification
- Kingdom: Plantae
- Clade: Tracheophytes
- Clade: Angiosperms
- Clade: Eudicots
- Clade: Rosids
- Order: Oxalidales
- Family: Elaeocarpaceae
- Genus: Aristotelia
- Species: A. fruticosa

Binomial name
- Aristotelia fruticosa Hook.f., 1852

Synonyms
- A. fruticosa var. α. suberecta Hook.f. A. fruticosa var. β. erecta Hook.f. A. fruticosa var. γ. prostrata Hook.f. A. fruticosa var. δ. microphylla Hook.f. A. erecta John Buchanan (botanist) Myrsine brachyclada Colenso A. fruticosa var. rigidula G.Simpson & J.S.Thomson

= Aristotelia fruticosa =

Species of tree or shrub

Aristotelia fruticosa, commonly known as the mountain wineberry or shrubby wineberry, is a species of tree or shrub endemic to New Zealand. It grows up to 2 metres (6 feet 7 inches) tall in a densely branching and divaricating form.

== Description ==
Aristotelia fruticosa is a divaricating upright shrub that grows up to 2 metres in height. This unique species is known to be heteroblastic, meaning that it changes its leaf shape as it matures. As a juvenile, this twiggy shrub produces various leaf shapes and sizes in opposing pairs or clusters, which can be displayed simultaneously on one plant, or have one leaf shape per individual. These can be narrow, lance-like (9–15 mm long), egg-shaped (5–7 mm long), or an amalgamation of the two. They mature into an obcordate shape (heart-like, tapered end attached to the stem) along their reddish-brown stems, averaging 12 mm long and 4 mm wide. The thin, leathery leaves are a shiny dark green on the surface with a contrasting light green underside showing a visible display of their veins.

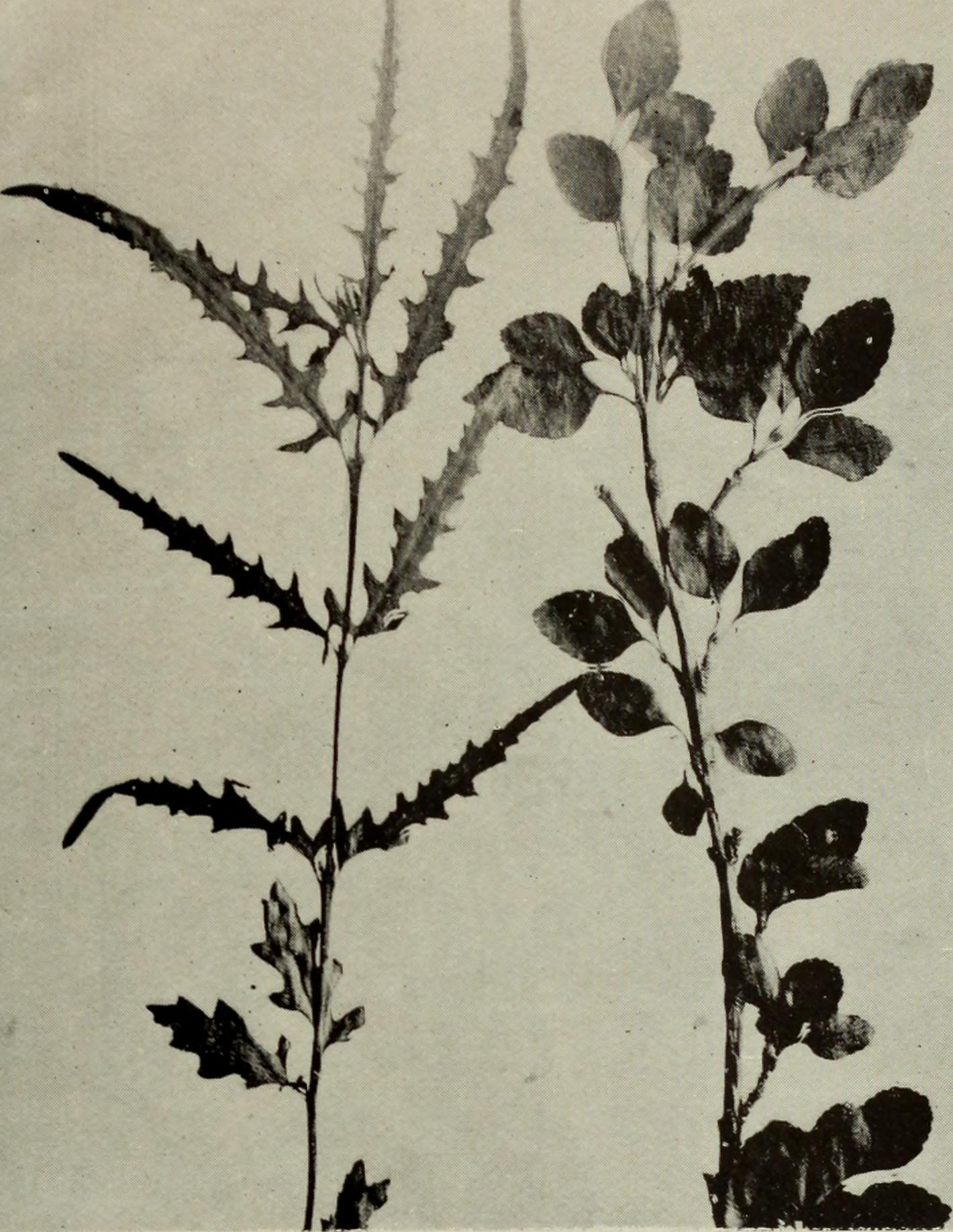
Leaves of juvenile (left) and adult (right)

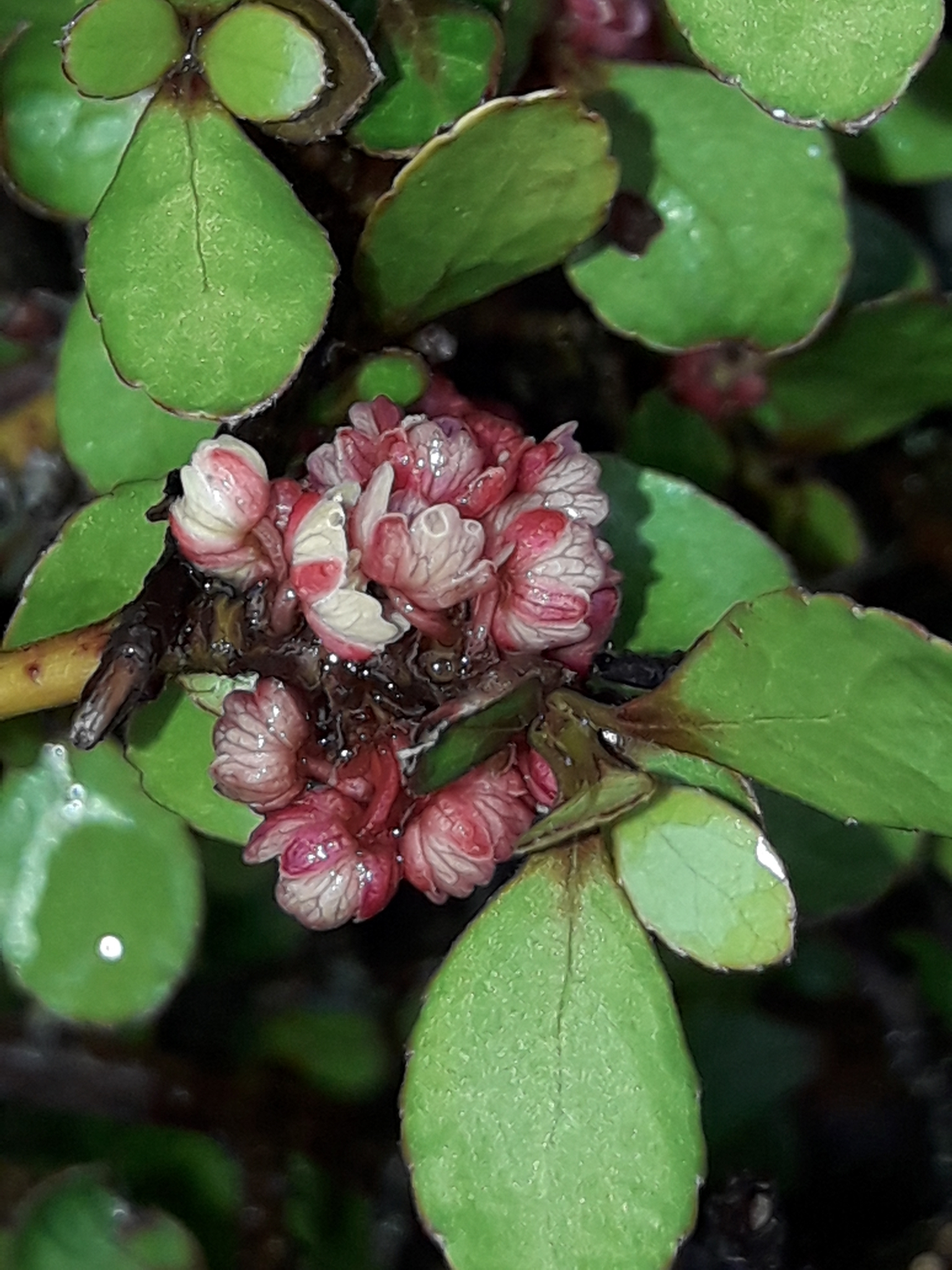
The flowers of Aristotelia fruticosa

Being dioecious, the flowers between the sexes look similar, but have different features. Both sexes have flowers that grow a few millimeters in diameter with colours ranging from cream-white to pink and red. Like the leaves, the petals have 1–4 rounded teeth at the tip of the petal with 4 sepals and grow in clusters. The male develops 4–6 pollen-producing stamens, whereas the female grows a two-lobed stamen which, when pollinated, develops into small clusters of berries up to 5 mm in diameter between March to April. The colour range of these bitter, opaque berries is similar to the flowers, including matte pink, red, cream-white and black. From the berries, four angled (not quite round) seeds are produced per berry.

== Distribution ==
Aristotelia fruticosa is endemic to New Zealand, meaning it is only found from 37°30’S midway down the North Island and throughout the South Island and Stewart Island. It is distributed throughout the southern and western side of Mt Ruapehu and its volcanic plateaus, on Tongariro tephera, across the North Island dividing range, along the eastern side of the Southern Alps, throughout Northwestern Fiordland, in South Otago and in central Stewart Island.

== Habitat ==
Aristotelia fruticosa is scattered throughout the landscape in many regions from montane to subalpine, in grasslands, shrublands, subalpine forests and fellfields from as low as 450 m to about 1,700 m in altitude. Cockayne describes some of the many environmental regions it can be found in, including a variety of wet and dry forests dominant in mountain beech (Fuscospora cliffortioides), or silver beech (Lophozonia menziesii), sub-alpine mixed forests dominant in pāhautea (Libocedrus bidwillii) and mountain tōtara (Podocarpus laetus), as well as dry bog forests dominated by stands of mountain toātoa (Phyllocladus alpinus). Cockayne notes that sub-alpine veronica-dominated shrubland is also a common habitat with shrubs often covered in lianes, as well as in cuppressoid-podocarp scrub dominant in bog pine (Halocarpus bidwillii) and pink pine (Halocarpus biformis). Being a transitional shrub, it is often found growing successionally in shrub-heath patches on land that has previously been fire damaged.

== Ecology ==
=== Life cycle and phenology ===
Showy clusters of brightly coloured flowers bloom between October and December. Interestingly, this shrub will produce flowers as a juvenile and continue to do so for the remainder of its life. The fruiting season is between January to April, after which its fleshy berries are dispersed by frugivory including by birds and other browsers. Its seeds have a low germination rate, but will begin to grow one year after dispersal.

=== Growing conditions ===
Aristotelia fruticosa thrives in colder climates and ideally prefers neither dry nor wet conditions, with shade to moderate sunlight. However, being an extremely hardy and adaptive shrub, it can live in various conditions and is tolerant of strong winds, snow and nutritionally poor and dry soils. Due to its deep root system, it can thrive in a variety of both nutritionally rich and deficient soils including soils rich in peat, raw humus, pumice, clayey loam, and stony soils mixed with clay and sand.

=== Predators ===
There are a variety of endemic invertebrates that live and feed on Aristotelia fruticosa. These include two scale insects (Aphenochiton inconspicuous and Eriochiton spinous), two moths (Epiphryne xathapis and Harmologa oblongata), a case moth (Liothula omnivora), an undescribed gall mite (Aristotelia leaf edge roller sp. ‘Fruticosa’) and a honey bee (Apis mellifera).

Browsers that are known to eat A. fruticosa include birds, introduced possums and ostriches, who seem to enjoy it, as well as goats and hares who will eat it on occasion.

Aristotelia fruticosa has also been found to be a preferred host to an endemic parasitic succulent commonly known as dwarf mistletoe (Korthalsella clavata).

== Unique adaptions ==
Leonard Cockayne describes Aristotelia fruticosa's unique adaptations that can make it look like a different species across locations. When exposed to extreme conditions with high light and little access to water, its xerophytic properties cause the branches to become almost leafless as they grow at extravagant, almost backwards angles and become more tapered and spike-like at the tips. Opposingly, it is also mesophytic, making it more bushy and lush with leaves when conditions are more optimal.

Aristotelia fruticosa is also known to hybridise in destroyed or damaged forest and along track edges with its lower-growing, more sheltered relative, Aristotelia serrata.

An interesting study by Howell, Kelly, and Turnbull was conducted to see how Aristotelia fruticosa's divaricating branches protect itself from the sun during winter. In order to test this, they had three conditions: a control (left untrimmed), an exposed (trimmed) group and a trimmed, but shaded group. The results of the study found the control and shaded groups did not show signs of damage, whereas the exposed group was damaged within a short period of time and took over three months to recover. They concluded that having divaricating branches is a way of protecting itself from extreme elements by growing its own shade.
