= Heterocycles (journal) =

- Discipline: Heterocyclic compounds
- Language: English
- Edited by: Keiichiro Fukumoto

Publication details
- History: 1973–2023
- Publisher: The Japan Institute of Heterocyclic Chemistry (Japan)

Standard abbreviations
- ISO 4: Heterocycles

Indexing
- CODEN: HTCYAM
- ISSN: 0385-5414 (print); 1881-0942 (web)
- LCCN: 81641583
- OCLC no.: 1416523935

Links
- Journal homepage; CLOCKSS Archive

Heterocycles was a peer-reviewed scientific journal covering research on heterocyclic compounds and published by the Japan Institute of Heterocyclic Chemistry.

== Abstracting and indexing ==
The journal was abstracted and indexed in the Chemical Abstracts Service and Scopus (1983–2022).
