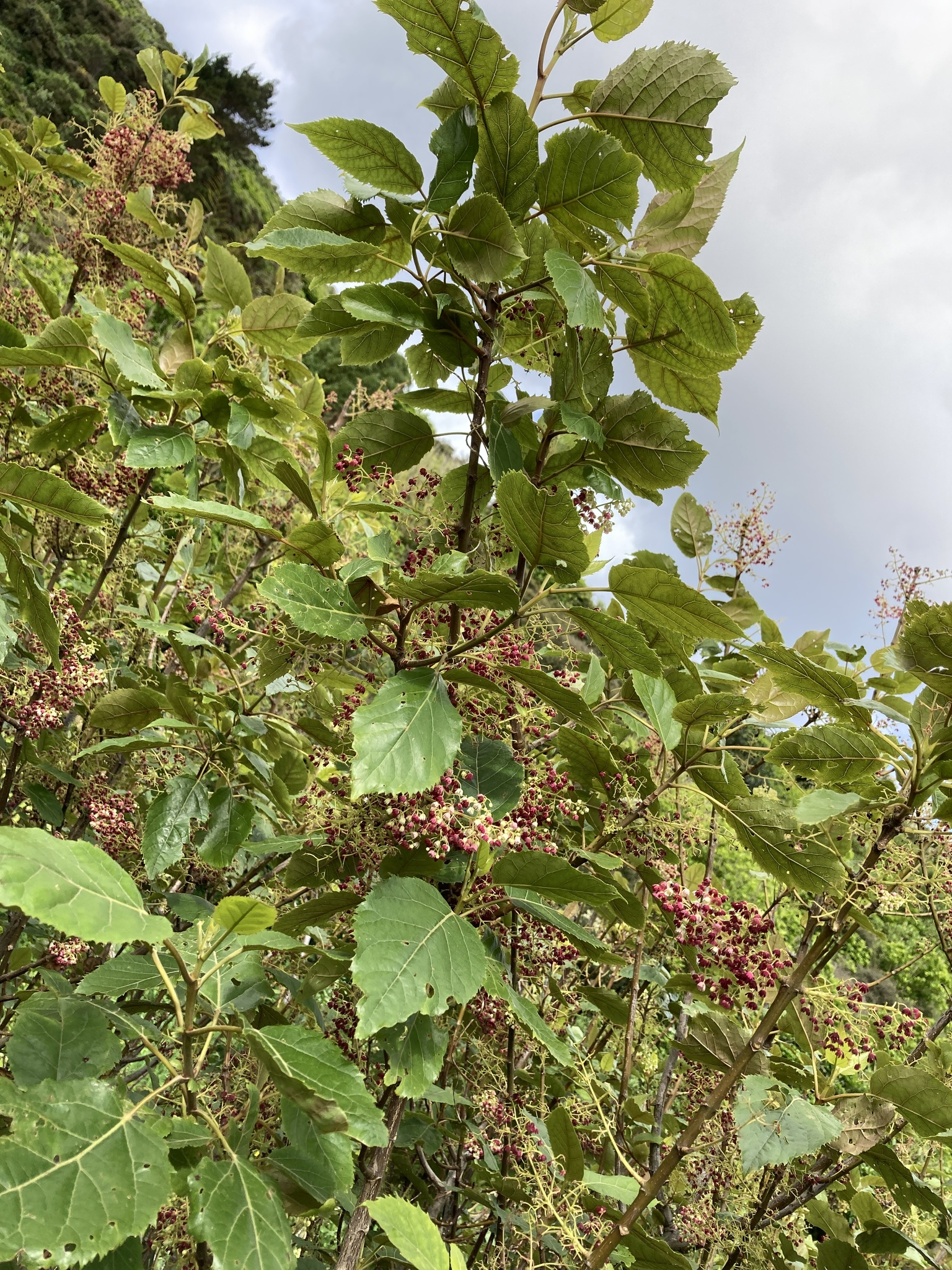
- Foliage and flowers of Aristotelia serrata

Conservation status
- Not Threatened (NZ TCS)

Scientific classification
- Kingdom: Plantae
- Clade: Tracheophytes
- Clade: Angiosperms
- Clade: Eudicots
- Clade: Rosids
- Order: Oxalidales
- Family: Elaeocarpaceae
- Genus: Aristotelia
- Species: A. serrata

Binomial name
- Aristotelia serrata J.R.Forst. & G.Forst.

Synonyms
- Dicera serrata J.R.Forst. & G.Forst.; Aristotelia racemosa Hook.f.; Friesia racemosa A.Cunn.; Triphalia rubicunda Hook.f.

= Aristotelia serrata =

Species of flowering plant

Aristotelia serrata, commonly known as wineberry and makomako, is a species of small tree in the family Elaeocarpaceae. It is a fast-growing dioecious tree which can be semideciduous. It is endemic to New Zealand. Its range mainly covers the North, South, and Stewart Islands. A. serrata is typically found in lowland to montane environments, and the plant can freely colonise disturbed areas. The tree can reach up to 10 metres (30 feet) tall, with a trunk diameter of up to 30 cm (12 in). The bark is grey or pale brown and smooth.

Aristotelia serrata was first described by the German botanists Georg and Johann Foster in 1776 as Dicera serrata, but Walter Oliver gave its current binomial name in 1921. Flowering occurs from September to December, with fruits ripening in summer. A. serrata's flowers change from a white-pink colour to a dark red colour, possibly to better adapt them for pollinators. The fruits are dispersed by fruit-eating animals (fruigivores), such as birds. The conservation status of A. serrata was assessed in 2023 in the New Zealand Threat Classification System as "Not Threatened".

== Description ==
Aristotelia serrata (wineberry) is a dioecious species of small tree up to about 10 metres (30 feet) tall, with a trunk up to 30 cm (10 in) in diameter. The smooth bark is grey or pale brown in colour, with flat lenticels. Branchlets are light to dark red in colour. Leaves are typically arranged oppositely or nearly so. The petioles are slender, greenish or pinkish in colour, and are up to 50 mm long. The laminae (leaf blades) are thin, smooth, 5 cm–12 cm × 4 cm–8 cm (2 in–5 in × 2 in–3 in) long, broad-ovate, and sharply serrated. The upper surface of the leaves is light or dark green in colour, and the undersides are paler. A. serrata can be semideciduous, meaning they partially lose their leaves in winter. A. serrata has been described as "fast-growing" and "short-lived".

The inflorescences (flower clusters) are found in panicles which are 6–10 cm (2–4 in) long. Flowering occurs from September to December. Flowers are 4–6 mm in diameter, and the panicles are 6–10 cm (2.4–3.9 in) long, or, on pedicels, are 5–10 mm long. The sepals are about 3 mm long and pink in colour. The petals are about 9 mm long, and white, light pink to red in colour. The stamens are numerous. Fruiting occurs from November to January. Fruits are fleshy berries, globe-shaped, bright red to black in colour, and 5 × 4 mm long. The seeds are 1.9–3.1 mm long. A. serrata has a diploid chromosome count of 28.

=== Phytochemistry ===
Aristotelia species contain several alkaloids. Several other compounds and enzymes have been discovered in A. serrata.

== Gallery ==
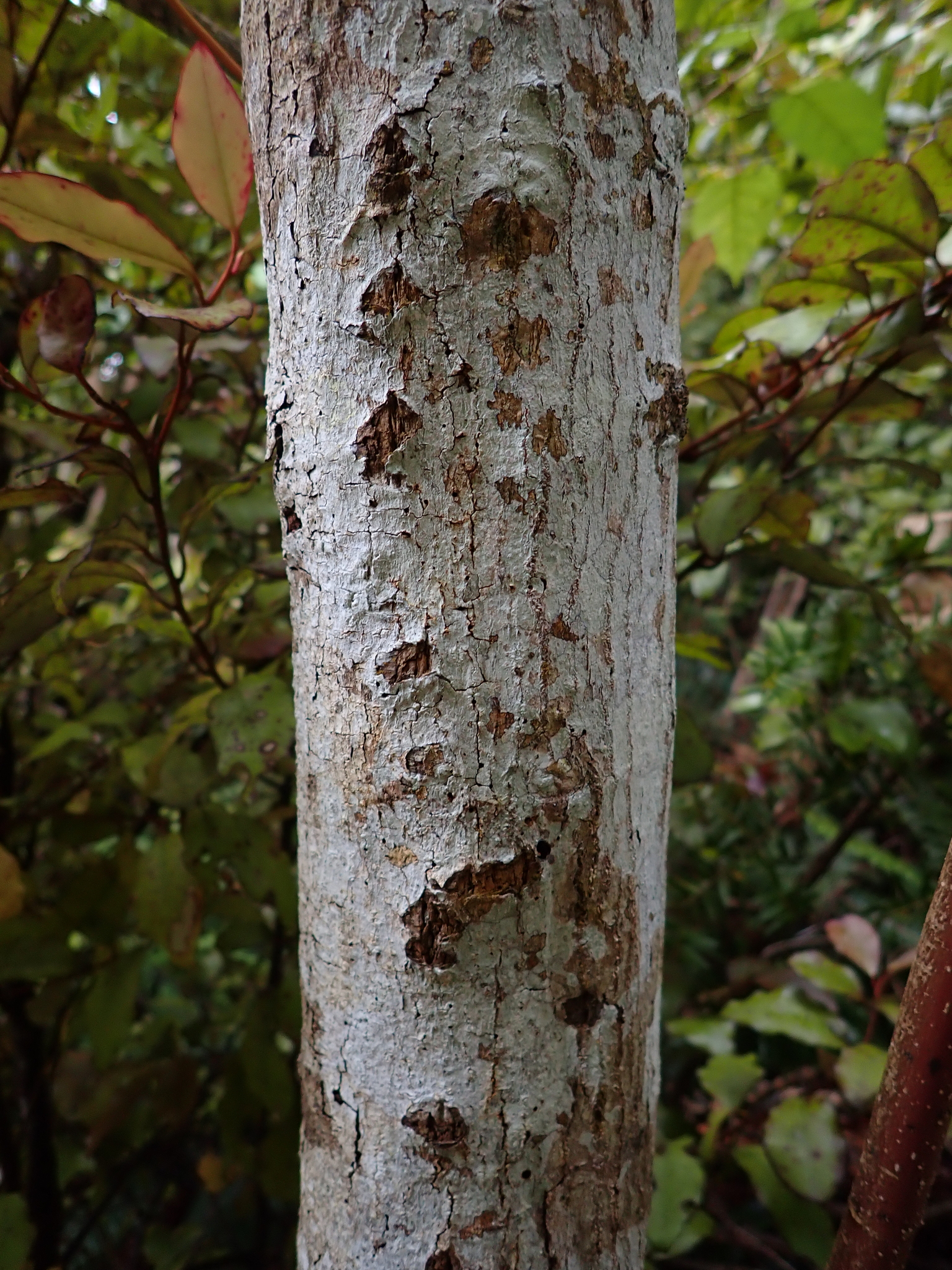
A. serrata's grey bark

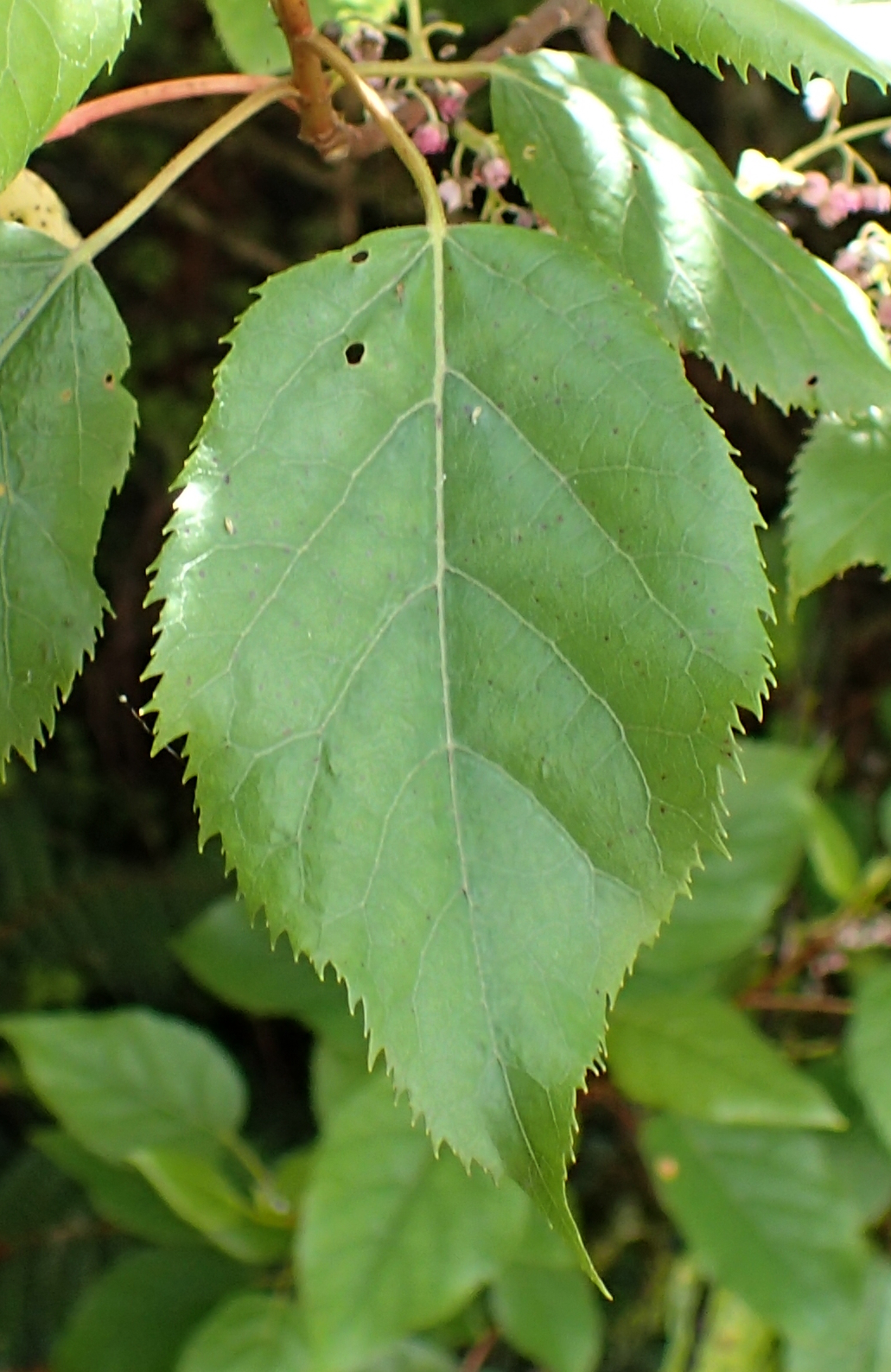
Close-up of the leaf with sharp serrations on the margins

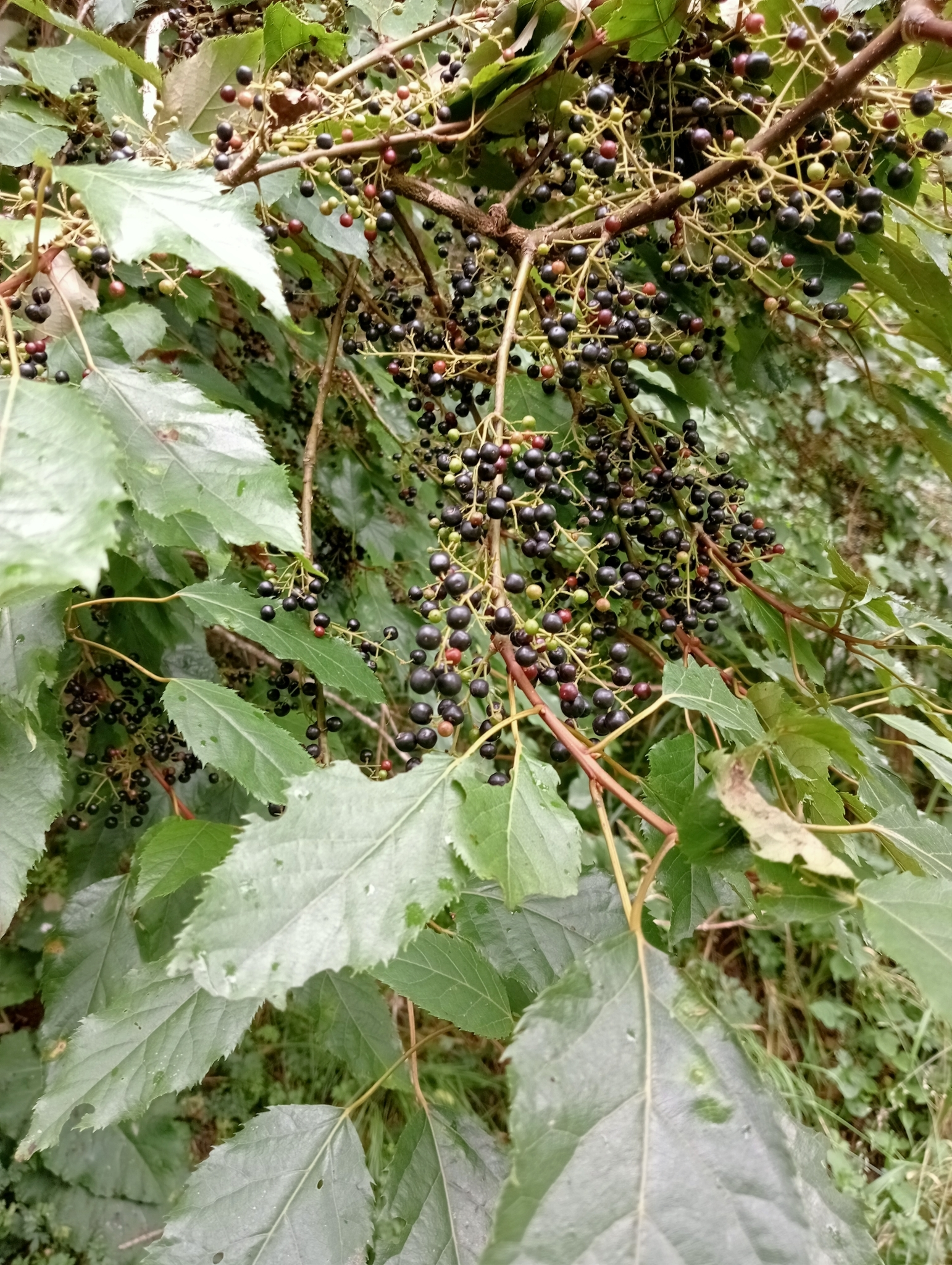
A. serrata's red to black-coloured fruits

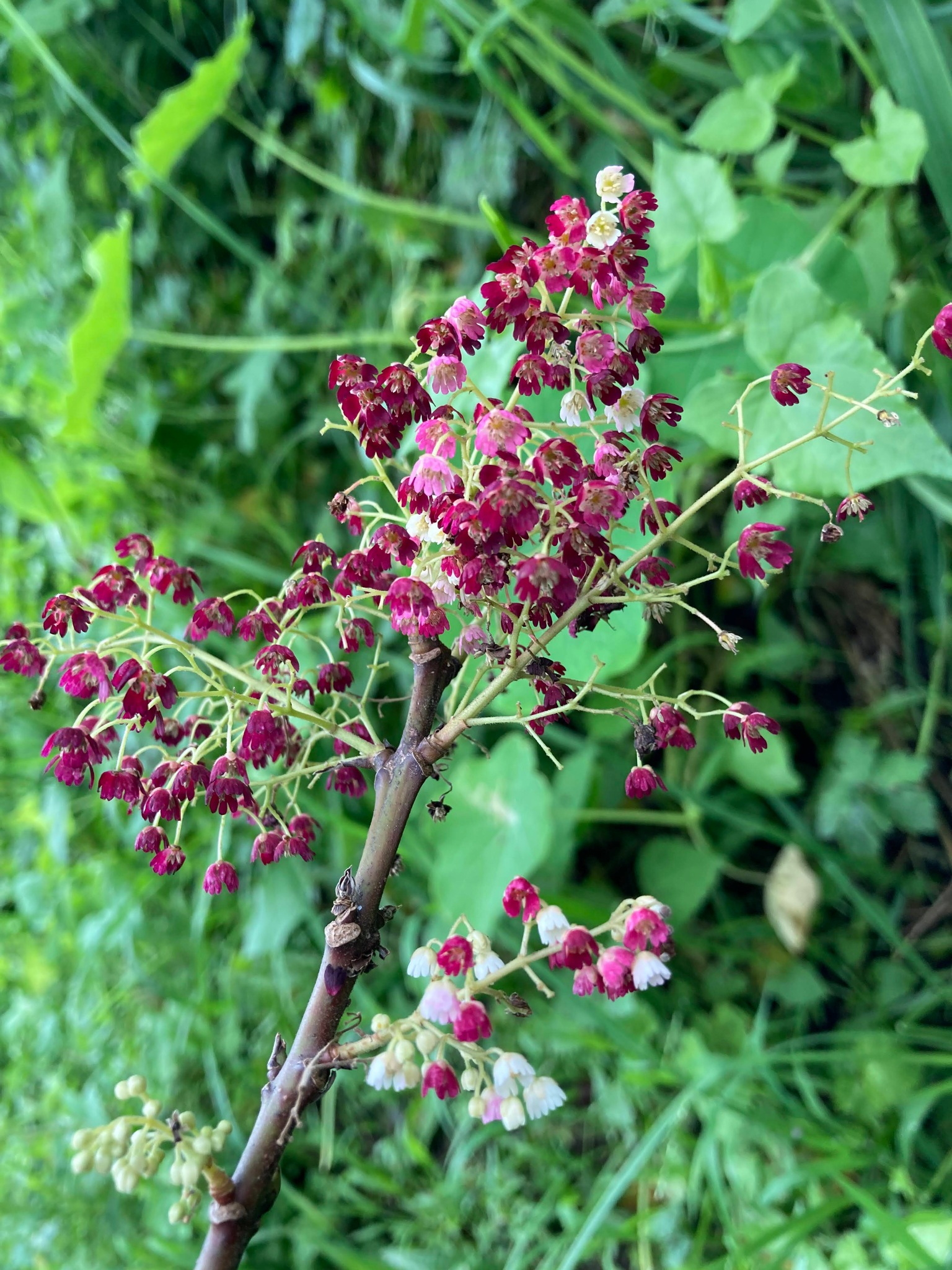
Flowers are found in inflorescences (clusters) and are white, pink or red in colour

== Taxonomy ==
Aristotelia serrata was first described in 1776 by the German naturalists Georg and Johann Foster in their Characteres generum plantarum as Dicera serrata. The species has three other synonyms: Aristotelia racemosa, Friesia racemosa, and Triphalia rubicunda. The species was given its current binomial name, Aristotelia serrata by Walter Oliver in a 1921 article in the Transactions and Proceedings of the New Zealand Institute. There are five species of the Aristotelia genus currently accepted by the Plants of the World Online taxonomic database. These species are native to Australia, Argentina, Chile, New Guinea, New Zealand, and Vanuatu. The genus Aristotelia is very closely related to Vallea in the family Elaeocarpaceae.

=== Etymology ===
The etymology of A. serrata's genus name, Aristotelia, is named after the Greek philosopher Aristotle. The specific epithet (second part of the scientific name), serrata, means saw-toothed. The species is commonly known as wineberry, makomako, and mako. The Māori name mako is shared with the name that some islands in the Pacific use for trees in the order Malvales.

== Ecology ==
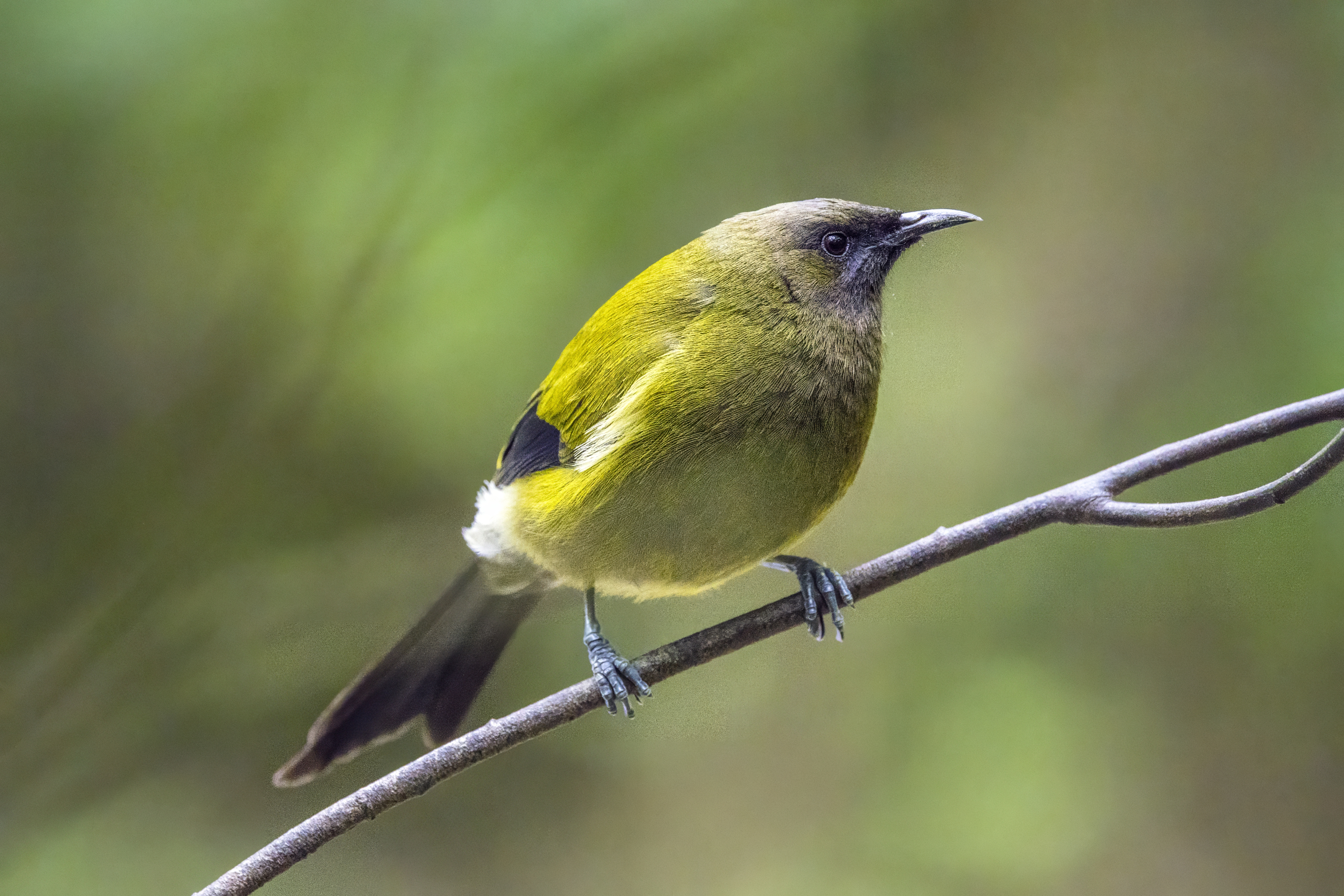
The native New Zealand bellbird consumes the fruits of A. serrata.

Aristotelia serrata's fruits are dispersed by fruit-eating animals (frugivores), such as birds. Burrows (1995) recorded that A. serrata fruits were consumed by native silvereyes (Zosterops lateralis), kererū (Hemiphaga novaeseelandiae), and New Zealand bellbirds (Anthornis melanura). Several other birds, including the kākā (Nestor meridionalis) and tūī (Prosthemadera novaeseelandiae) have also been recorded feeding on the fruit.

Aristotelia serrata plays host to the endemic moths Aenetus virescens and Declana floccosa, and also the beetle species Oemona hirta. Paradoxaphis aristoteliae, a species of aphid, can also be hosted on A. serrata. The leaves contain large amounts of phenols which make them attractive to introduced possums. The leaves are also eaten by cattle, deer, and goats. A. serrata can tolerate areas with low soil moisture.

The tree is dioecious, meaning individual plants are either male or female. Pollination is likely achieved by birds and insects. The flowers do not have a scent and are about the same size in both sexes. Flowers of A. serrata change colours from a white-pink colour to a dark red colour, possibly to better adapt them for pollinators. The nectar from the flowers is consumed by stitchbirds (Notiomystis cincta), and the pollen is consumed by native weevils.

== Distribution ==
Aristotelia serrata is endemic to New Zealand. It is a common species, A. serrata is found throughout the country, but is less common in drier areas. Its range mainly covers the North, South, and Stewart Islands. The New Zealand botanist Thomas Kirk called it "one of the commonest plants in the colony" in his 1889 revision The Forest Flora of New Zealand. Its 2023 conservation status in the New Zealand Threat Classification System was "Not Threatened". Its assessment in the IUCN Red List in 2025 was "Least Concern", and its population trend was evaluated as "Unknown".

=== Habitat ===
Aristotelia serrata is typically found in lowland to montane environments. It reaches 1,050 m (3,000 ft) above sea level at maximum elevation. A. serrata exhibits colonial characteristics, being able to colonise disturbed sites, especially after forest clearance, fire, tree fall, and storm damage. A. serrata is commonly found on fertile, well-drained soils of young terraces and alluvial fans, as well as on recently disturbed areas and older terraces.

== Uses ==
=== In Māori culture ===
Aristotelia serrata's fruits were eaten raw by the indigenous Māori people, especially by children. The taste of the fruits varies from sweet to bitter, according to the botanist Andrew Crowe. The bark also produces a blue-black coloured dye. The Māori were attracted to the medicinal properties of the plant, for example, the leaves and bark were boiled, and then the infusion produced was used to treat burns and sore eyes. Other miscellaneous uses, include the wood used as handles for fishing nets and the sticks used in the Māori stick game known as poi rākau.

=== In European culture ===
European settlers manufactured parts of the tree as a substitute for gunpowder. This practice was documented in the town of Owaka in the South Island. The wood is white and straight-grained. The timber was occasionally used by European settlers for cabinetmaking, marquetry, woodturning, fence-rails and other similar purposes. European settlers named the tree wineberry because the fruits were used in the production of wine, and also jams and jellies.

== Works cited ==
Books

- Crowe, Andrew (2009). Which Native Tree? New Zealand Native Trees: A Simple Guide to their Identification, Ecology and Uses. Auckland, New Zealand: Penguin Books. ISBN 978-0-14-300899-6.
- Dawson, John; Lucas, Rob (2011). Field Guide to New Zealand's Native Trees. Nelson, New Zealand: Potton & Burton. ISBN 978-1-877517-01-3.
- Garnock-Jones, Philip (2025). He Puāwai. Auckland, New Zealand: Auckland University Press. ISBN 978-1-77671-168-0.
- Gledhill, David (6 March 2008). The Names of Plants. Cambridge, United Kingdom: Cambridge University Press. ISBN 978-0-521-68553-5.
- Kirk, Thomas (1889). The Forest Flora of New Zealand. Wellington, New Zealand: George Didsbury – via the Internet Archive.
- Wardle, J. (2011). Wardle's Native Plants of New Zealand and Their Story. Bateson Publishing Limited. ISBN 9781877520068.

Journals

- Bick, I. Ralph C.; Hai, Mohammad A.; Preston, Nigel W. (1983). "The Structures of Serratenone and Serratoline, Two Alkaloids from Aristotelia serrata". Heterocycles. 20 (4): 667. doi:10.3987/R-1983-04-0667. ISSN 0385-5414.
- Burrows, C. J. (1995). "Germination behaviour of the seeds of the New Zealand species Aristotelia serrata, Coprosma robusta, Cordyline australis, Myrtus obcordata, and Schefflera digitata". New Zealand Journal of Botany. 33 (2): 257–264. doi:10.1080/0028825X.1995.10410488. ISSN 0028-825X.
- Coode, M. J. E. (1985). "Aristotelia and Vallea, Closely Related in Elaeocarpaceae". Kew Bulletin. 40 (3). Springer, Royal Botanic Gardens, Kew: 479–507. ISSN 0075-5974. JSTOR 4109610.
- McGlone, Matt S.; Dungan, Roger J.; Hall, Graeme M.J.; Allen, Robert B. (2004). "Winter leaf loss in the New Zealand woody flora". New Zealand Journal of Botany. 42 (1): 1–19. doi:10.1080/0028825X.2004.9512887. ISSN 0028-825X.
- Majid, Hafiz; Silva, Filipa V.M. (2020). "Improvement of butyrylcholinesterase enzyme inhibition and medicinal properties of extracts of Aristotelia serrata leaves by ultrasound extraction". Food and Bioproducts Processing. 124. Elsevier BV: 445–454. doi:10.1016/j.fbp.2020.10.004. ISSN 0960-3085.
- O'Donnell, Colin F.J.; Dilks, Peter J. (1994). "Foods and Foraging of Forest Birds in Temperate Rainforest, South Westland, New Zealand". New Zealand Journal of Ecology. 18 (2). New Zealand Ecological Society: 87–107. ISSN 0110-6465. JSTOR 24066768.
- Sopow, Stephanie L.; Bain, John (2017). "A checklist of New Zealand Cerambycidae (Insecta: Coleoptera), excluding Lamiinae". New Zealand Entomologist. 40 (2): 55–71. Bibcode:2017NZEnt..40...55S. doi:10.1080/00779962.2017.1357423. ISSN 0077-9962.
- Stewart, G. H.; Basher, L. R.; Burrows, L. E.; Runkle, J. R.; Hall, G. M. J.; Jackson, R. J. (1993). "Beech-Hardwood Forest Composition, Landforms, and Soil Relationships, North Westland, New Zealand". Vegetatio. 106 (2). Springer: 111–125. ISSN 0042-3106. JSTOR 20046286.
- Sunde, R.G. (1987). "A New Indigenous Aphid from New Zealand (Homoptera: Aphididae)". New Zealand Journal of Zoology. 14 (4): 587–592. doi:10.1080/03014223.1987.10423031. ISSN 0301-4223.

Websites

- De Lange, Peter (2026). "Aristotelia serrata". New Zealand Plant Conservation Network. Archived from the original on 12 January 2026.
- Svensson, M.S. (2025). "Aristotelia serrata". IUCN Red List of Threatened Species. 2025 e.T254427400A254427402. doi:10.2305/IUCN.UK.2025-1.RLTS.T254427400A254427402.en.
- "Aristotelia L'Hér". Plants of the World Online. Archived from the original on 10 December 2024 – via Royal Botanic Gardens, Kew.
- "Aristotelia serrata (J.R.Forst. & G.Forst.) Oliv". Plants of the World Online. Archived from the original on 3 August 2025 – via Royal Botanic Gardens, Kew.
- "Ngā Rauropi Whakaoranga — Aristotelia serrata. Makomako. Wineberry". Manaaki Whenua – Landcare Research. 2023. Archived from the original on 16 June 2025.
