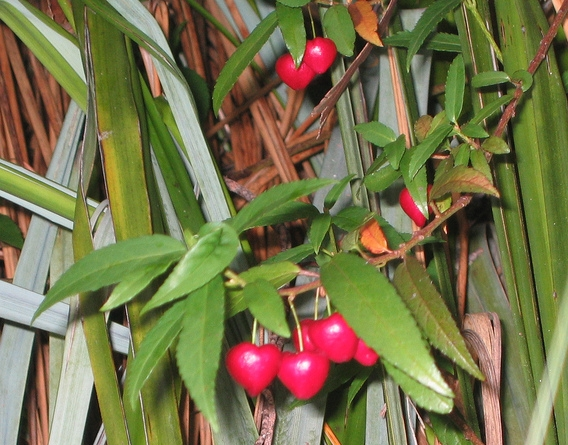
- Aristotelia peduncularis

Scientific classification
- Kingdom: Plantae
- Clade: Tracheophytes
- Clade: Angiosperms
- Clade: Eudicots
- Clade: Rosids
- Order: Oxalidales
- Family: Elaeocarpaceae
- Genus: Aristotelia; L'Hér.

Species
- See text

= Aristotelia (plant) =

Genus of flowering plants

Aristotelia is a genus with 18 species, of tree in the family Elaeocarpaceae. It is named in honor of the Greek philosopher, observer and classifier of nature, Aristotle.

== Species ==
- Aristotelia australasica
- Aristotelia braithwaitei
- Aristotelia chilensis
- Aristotelia colensoi
- Aristotelia erecta
- Aristotelia fruticosa
- Aristotelia peduncularis
- Aristotelia serrata
